= List of Norwegian films of the 1940s =

Films produced in Norway in the 1940s:

== 1940s ==
Title	Director	Cast	Genre	Notes
1940
Bastard	Helge Lunde		Drama, Adventure	Co-production with Sweden
Godvakker-Maren	Knut Hergel		Comedy	
Mannen som alle ville myrde	Arne Bornebusch		Crime comedy	Co-production with Sweden
Tante Pose	Leif Sinding	Henny Skjønberg	Comedy	
Tørres Snørtevold	Tancred Ibsen	Alfred Maurstad	Comedy	Based on the novel Jacob by Alexander Kielland
1941
Den forsvundne pølsemaker	Toralf Sandø	Leif Juster, Ernst Diesen	Comedy	
Gullfjellet	Rasmus Breistein		Comedy	
Hansen og Hansen	Alfred Maurstad		Comedy	
Kjærlighet og vennskap	Leif Sinding		Drama	
1942
Den farlige leken	Tancred Ibsen		Comedy	
Det æ'kke te å tru	Toralf Sandø		Comedy	
En herre med bart	Alfred Maurstad		Comedy	
Jeg drepte!	Toralf Sandø		Drama	
Trysil-Knut	Rasmus Breistein		Adventure, Drama	
Vi er Vidkun Quislings hirdmenn	Walter Fyrst		Propaganda	Nazi propaganda film made under German occupation.
1943
Bergen	Harry Ivarson		Documentary	
Den nye lægen	Rasmus Breistein	Jon Lennart Mjøen	Drama	
Sangen til livet	Leif Sinding		Drama	
Unge viljer	Walter Fyrst		Drama	
Vigdis	Helge Lunde	Eva Sletto, Lars Tvinde, Liv Uchermann Selmer	Drama	
1944
Brudekronen	Walter Fyrst		Drama	
Kommer du, Elsa?	Toralf Sandø	Aase Bye	Musical, Drama	
Ti gutter og en gjente	Alexey Zaitzow		Children's Film	
Villmarkens lov	Walter Fyrst		Crime	
1945
Rikard Noordraak	Alf Scott-Hansen	Georg Løkkeberg	Biopic, Drama	
Kong Håkon VIIs regjeringsjubileum 1945			Documentary	
1946
Englandsfarere	Toralf Sandø		War film	
Et spøkelse forelsker seg	Tancred Ibsen		Comedy	
Fra London til Lofoten			Documentary	
Om kjærligheten synger de	Olav Dalgard		Drama	
Så møtes vi imorgen	Nils R. Müller		Drama	
To liv	Titus Vibe-Müller		War film	
Vi vil leve	Olav Dalgard, Rolf Randall		War film, Drama	
1947
5 år – som vi så dem	Per G. Jonson, Bredo Lind		Documentary	
Det grodde fram	Lyder Selvig		Documentary	
Sankt Hans fest	Toralf Sandø		Drama	
1948
Den hemmelighetsfulle leiligheten	Tancred Ibsen		Drama	
Hvor fartøy flyte kan			Documentary	
Jørund Smed	Åke Ohberg		Drama	Norwegian-Swedish co-production
Kampen om tungtvannet	Jean Dréville, Titus Vibe-Müller		War film	
Trollfossen	Alf Scott-Hansen		Drama	
Vi seiler	Toralf Sandø		Documentary	
1949
Aldri mer!	Alfred Solaas		Drama	
Døden er et kjærtegn	Edith Carlmar		Drama	
Gategutter	Arne Skouen		Drama	
I gode hender	Arthur J. Ornitz		Short	
Jorden rundt på to timer	Rasmus Breistein		Documentary	First Norwegian feature film in color
Svendsen går videre	Nils R. Müller		Sponsored film	
Tim og Tøffe	Ivo Caprino		Short/animation	
Vi flyger på Rio	Åke Ohberg		Drama	
