= List of Norwegian films before 1930 =

Films produced in Norway before 1930:

== 1900s ==
Title	Director	Cast	Genre	Notes
1908
Fiskerlivets farer	Julius Jaenzon	Alma Lund; Henry Hagerup	Short / drama	The first film ever made in Norway.; All prints are lost.

== 1910s ==
Title	Director	Cast	Genre	Notes
1910
1911
Anny – en gatepiges roman	Adam Eriksen		Romance, Drama	
Bondefangeri i Vaterland	Pehr Qværnstrøm		Short/drama	The film is considered lost.
Dæmonen	Jens Christian Gundersen, Alfred Lind		Short/drama	
Fattigdommens forbandelse	Halfdan Nobel Roede		Short / drama	Considered the first Norwegian fiction film
Under forvandlingens lov	Halfdan Nobel Roede		Short/romantic drama	The oldest surviving Norwegian film
1912
Alt for Norge	Halfdan Nobel Roede		Short/drama	
Hemmeligheden	Halfdan Nobel Roede		Short/drama	The film is considered lost.
En moders kaerlighed	Peter Lykke-Seest		Short	
Roald Amundsen på Sydpolen	Sverre Halvorsen		Short/animation	
De uheldige friere	A. James Gee		Short/comedy	
1913
Overfaldet på poståpnerens datter	Ottar Gladtvedt		Short/crime	
1914
1915
1916
Under kjærlighedens aak	Alex Christian		Drama	
1917
De Forældreløse	Peter Lykke-Seest		Drama	The film is considered lost.
En Vinternat	Oscar Gustafson, Peter Lykke-Seest		Crime	The film is considered lost.
Fanden i nøtten	Ola Cornelius		Short/animation	
Hjærtetyven	Lau Lauritzen		Drama, Romance	
Livets gøglespil		Erna Schøyen	Drama	
Synd skal sones	Alex Christian	Erna Schøyen	Drama, Romance	
Unge hjerter	Peter Lykke-Seest		Drama, Romance	
1918
Lodsens datter	Peter Lykke-Seest		Short/drama	The film is considered lost.
Revolutionens datter	Ottar Gladtvedt		Drama	
Vor tids helte	Peter Lykke-Seest		Drama	The film is considered lost.
1919
Historien om en gut	Peter Lykke-Seest		Crime drama	
Æresgjesten	Peter Lykke-Seest		Crime drama	The film is considered lost.

== 1920s ==
Title	Director	Cast	Genre	Notes
1920
Fante-Anne	Rasmus Breistein		Crime drama	
Kaksen på Øverland	Gustav Adolf Olsen		Crime drama	
1921
Blandt Syd-Amerikas urskovsindianere	Ottar Gladtvedt		Documentary	
Felix	Rasmus Breistein		Romantic drama	
Jomfru Trofast	Rasmus Breistein		Drama	
Growth of the Soil	Gunnar Sommerfeldt		Drama	
Under Polarkredsens Himmel			Short/documentary	
1922
Farende folk	Amund Rydland		Crime drama	
Kjærlighet paa pinde	Erling Eriksen		Romantic comedy	
Pan	Harald Schwenzen		Drama	
1923
Nordenfor Polarcirkelen			Documentary	
Norge – en skildring i 6 akter			Documentary	
Strandhugg paa Kavringen	Gunnar Nilsen-Vig		Comedy/drama	The film is considered lost.
1924
Til sæters	Harry Ivarson		Romantic drama	
1925
Fager er lien	Harry Ivarson		Romantic drama	The film is considered lost.
Himmeluret	Amund Rydland, Leif Sinding		Drama	
Med «Stavangerfjord» til Nordkap			Documentary	
1926
Baldevins bryllup	George Schnéevoigt		Comedy/drama	
Bride of Glomdal	Carl Theodor Dreyer		Drama / romance	Based on the stories "Glomdalsbruden" and "Eline Vangen" by Jacob B. Bull.
Brudeferden i Hardanger	Rasmus Breistein		Drama	
Den nye lensmannen	Leif Sinding		Crime drama	
Hallo! Amerika!			Documentary	
Luftskibet «Norge»s flugt over Polhavet			Documentary	
Med Maud over Polhavet	Odd Dahl		Documentary	
Over Atlanterhavet og gjennom Amerika			Documentary	
Simen Mustrøens besynderlige opplevelser	Harry Ivarson		Thriller/comedy	
1927
Den glade enke i Trangvik	Harry Ivarson		Comedy	
Fjeldeventyret	Leif Sinding		Drama	
Madame besøker Oslo	Harry Ivarson		Drama	
Norges-Filmen	Tancred Ibsen		Documentary	
Syv dage for Elisabeth	Leif Sinding		Comedy	
Troll-elgen	Walter Fyrst		Drama	
1928
Cafe X	Walter Fyrst		Crime drama	
Raid on the Bergen Express	Uwe Jens Krafft		Crime Comedy	
Viddenes folk	Ragnar Westfelt		Romantic drama	
1929
Laila	George Schnéevoigt		Romantic drama	
Se Norge	Gustav Lund		Documentary	
Selvigs Norgesfilm	Lyder Selvig		Documentary	
