= Sophus Dahl =

Norwegian actor

- Born: Oliver Sofus Pettersen Dahl; December 20, 1877; Horg Municipality, Norway
- Died: November 30, 1952 (aged 74)
- Occupation: Actor
- Parent(s): Peder Dahl, Johanna Iversdatter Elgaaen

Oliver Sofus Pettersen Dahl (December 20, 1877 – November 30, 1952) was a Norwegian theater and film actor.

Dahl was born in Horg Municipality, Norway, the son of Peder Dahl and Johanna Iversdatter Elgaaen. He was the half-brother of the novelist and playwright Johan Bojer. Dahl married the actress Inga Sparre Dahl, with whom he established a touring ensemble after Ludovica Levy's National Tour (Nationalturneen) closed in 1912. In 1918 they started performing at the new theater in Stavanger, and Dahl was also involved in the start-up of the Trondheim Theater in 1911. Dahl led the new Søilen Theater from 1930 to 1932.

== Works ==
- Teaterminner. Fra Nasjonalturneens dager (Theater Memories. From the Days of the National Tour; 1959), edited by his son Torbjørn Sparre Dahl.

== Filmography ==
- 1926: Simen Mustrøens besynderlige opplevelser as Per Pikajord
- 1932: Den store barnedåpen
- 1933: Jeppe på bjerget as a farmer
- 1936: Morderen uten ansikt as Brenne, a detective
- 1936: Vi vil oss et land... as Amund Fisker
- 1938: Bør Børson Jr. as Bertil, a smallholder
- 1939: De vergeløse as Olsen
- 1939: Gjest Baardsen as a constable
- 1939: En enda natt as Krogh
- 1941: Kjærlighet og vennskap as Erik Lind
- 1943: Sangen til livet as the prison director
- 1949: Svendsen går videre

== Radio ==
- 1941: Fridtjof Nansen – en helt fra vår egen tid, radio play for the Norwegian Broadcasting Corporation, as a professor
