= Rolf Christensen =

Norwegian actor and film director

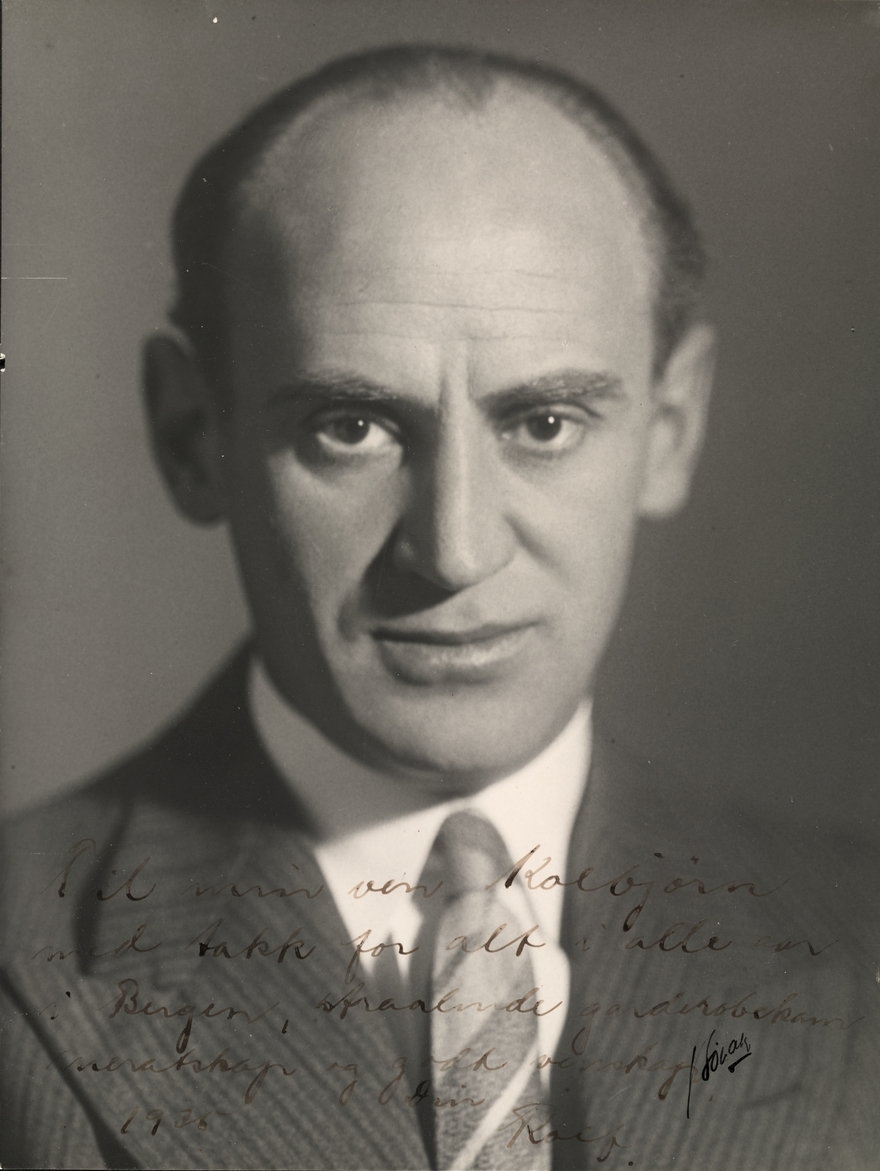
- Born: August 4, 1894; Skien, Norway
- Died: May 18, 1962 (aged 67); Oslo, Norway
- Occupations: actor and film director

Rolf Christensen (August 4, 1894 – May 18, 1962) was a Norwegian actor and film director who was particularly well known for his roles in operettas, plays, and farces.

Christensen debuted on stage in 1918 at the Trondheim National Theater and was engaged from 1922 to 1935 with the National Theater. He was engaged with the Central Theater from 1935 onward, both as an actor and director. Most of his work, both as an actor and a director, was in operettas, plays, and farces. An exception was his dramatic leading role in Toralf Sandø's production of Victor Borg's play Jeg drepte! (I Have Killed), which he performed at the Central Theater in 1941 and reprised in the film of the same name a year later.

He made his film debut in 1921 with a supporting role in Growth of the Soil, an adaptation of Knut Hamsun's novel of the same name. He played the lead role in the film Jeg drepte! and also had supporting roles in films such as Pan (1922), De vergeløse (1939), Tørres Snørtevold (1940), and Kasserer Jensen (1954).

Christensen was among the founders of the Guild of Norwegian Directors (Norsk Sceneinstruktørforening).

== Filmography ==
- 1921: Growth of the Soil
- 1922: Pan, as the doctor
- 1937: Bra mennesker (Good People), as Gullik Kremmer
- 1939: De vergeløse (The Defenceless), as Myrbråten, a smallholder
- 1940: Tørres Snørtevold, as the school principal
- 1942: Jeg drepte! (I Have Killed!), as Gunnar Bøhmer, a doctor
- 1942: Det æ'kke te å tru (It's Unbelievable), as Olsen, an accountant
- 1946: To liv, as Sahlmann, a subagent
- 1954: Kasserer Jensen (Jensen the Cashier), as the prosecutor
- 1954: Portrettet (The Portrait), as Wilhelm Borch, a painter
- 1955: The Summer Wind Blows, as Kristian Aare
- 1957: Stevnemøte med glemte år (Meeting with Forgotten Years)
- 1959: The Master and His Servants
- 1961: The Passionate Demons, as Jacob's father
