= Vi vil oss et land... (film) =

- Directed by: Leif Sinding; Ernst Ottersen
- Starring: Eugen Skjønberg; Erna Schøyen; Else Heiberg; Jon Lennart Mjøen; Leif Norder; Sophus Dahl; Einar Tveito; Arne Kleve; Oscar Egede-Nissen; Per Kvist; Ellen Siding
- Cinematography: Ottar Gladtvet
- Edited by: Harry Ivarson; Leif Sinding
- Music by: Erling Røberg; Willie Vieth
- Distributed by: Gladtvet film
- Release date: 1936
- Running time: 40 minutes
- Country: Norway
- Language: Norwegian

Vi vil oss et land... (We Want Ourselves a Country) was a 1936 election propaganda film for the Norwegian Conservative Party, directed by Leif Sinding. The title is taken from a poem by Per Sivle.

== Plot ==
The film showed, among other things, how unnecessary the workers' strikes were and how unnecessarily high the taxes were. In one scene, a man in a suit is pulled by trolls to Dovregubben's Hall. Dovregubben turns out to be ruled by the evil "communist" Norwegian Labor Party.

== Cast ==
- Eugen Skjønberg as Kåre Fjell, a bookkeeper
- Erna Schøyen as Marie Fjell, Kåre Fjell's wife
- Else Heiberg as Dagny Fjell, daughter of Kåre and Marie
- Jon Lennart Mjøen as Frithjof Eker
- Sophus Dahl as Amund Fisker
- Oscar Egede-Nissen as a worker
- Arne Kleve as Anders, an old townsman
- Per Kvist as the treasurer
- Leif Norder as Tor Skar, the editorial secretary for Morgenrøden
- Ellen Sinding as a dancer
- Einar Tveito as Per Lium, a smallholder
