= Joachim Holst-Jensen =

Norwegian actor

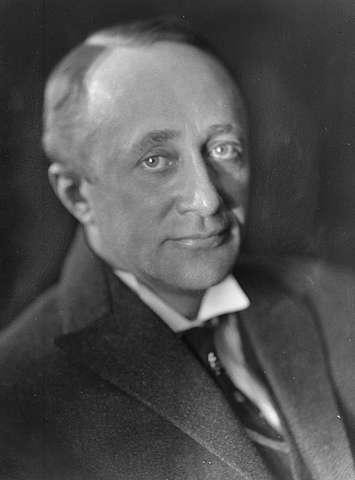
- Born: 16 June 1880; Bergen, Norway
- Died: 7 March 1963 (aged 82); Oslo, Norway
- Occupation: Actor
- Years active: 1927–1960
- Spouse: Signe Wilhelmine Timm (15 August 1908 – 1948) (her death)

Joachim Holst-Jensen (16 June 1880 – 7 March 1963) was a Norwegian stage and film actor. He appeared in more than 40 films between 1927 and 1960.

== Partial filmography ==
- Den glade enke i Trangvik (1927) - Berg, telegrafist
- Madame besøker Oslo (1927) - Baron Felix de Video
- Vi som går kjøkkenveien (1933) - Journalist
- Jeppe på bjerget (1933) - Venn av baronen
- To levende og en død (1937) - Engelhardt
- Fant (1937) - Søren, Fændriks onkel
- Ungen (1938) - a waiter
- Bør Børson Jr. (1938) - Ole Elveplassen
- Familien på Borgan (1939) - Cohn, advokat
- De vergeløse (1939) - Wollert, professor
- Her Little Majesty (1939) - Generalkonsul Hauge
- Gjest Baardsen (1939) - Mons Peder Michelsen, arrestforvarer
- Gryr i Norden (1939) - Christian H.
- Bastard (1940) - En fangevokter
- Tante Pose (1940) - Plum, sakfører
- Tørres Snørtevold (1940) - En gjest
- Hansen og Hansen (1941) - Tallaksen, a hydraulic engineer
- Nygifta (1941) - Mr. Gundersen
- The Sausage-Maker Who Disappeared (1941) - pølsemaker H. Brand
- Gullfjellet (1941) - Tater-Mekkel
- Trysil-Knut (1942) - Anneus Phil, intendant
- Jeg drepte! (1942) - Fredriksen
- En herre med bart (1942) - Nils, mannen til Miriam
- Den farlige leken (1942)
- Hansen og Hansen (1943) - Tallaksen, vassdragsingeniør
- Sangen til livet (1943) - Graali, redaktør
- Vigdis (1943) - P.P. Jeremiassen, skomaker
- Villmarkens lov (1944) - Direktøren
- Et spøkelse forelsker seg (1946) - Et spøkelse
- Trollfossen (1946) - Vang, Sylvias far
- Den hemmelighetsfulle leiligheten (1946) - Doktoren
- To mistenkelige personer (1950)
- Storfolk og småfolk (1951) - En omstreifer
- Ukjent mann (1951) - Jansen
- Emergency Landing (1952) - Willie, presten
- Skøytekongen (1953)
- Selkvinnen (1953) - Rantzau, dommer
- Circus Fandango (1954) - Papa, clown
- Troll i ord (1954) - Joachim Tønnesen
- På solsiden (1956)
- Nine Lives (1957) - Bestefar
- Hjemme hos oss. Husmorfilmen 1957. (1957)
- I slik en natt (1958) - Goggen
- Hete septemberdager (1959) - Hennes mann 'malersvennen'
- 5 loddrett (1959) - Mr. Backer, Managing Director at A / S Grammofon
- Millionær for en aften (1960)
