= August Mowinckel-Nilsen =

Norwegian actor (1883–1957)

- Born: May 15, 1883; Bergen, Norway
- Died: November 6, 1957 (aged 74); Oslo, Norway
- Occupation: Actor

August Mowinckel-Nilsen (also known as Gogo Mowinckel-Nilsen, May 15, 1883 – November 6, 1957) was a Norwegian stage and film actor.

== Family ==
August Mowinckel-Nilsen was born in Bergen, the son of the shipbroker Helen Caspar Nilsen (1856–1920) and Augusta Mowinckel (1863–1947).

== Career ==
Mowicnkel-Nilsen made his stage debut as a young priest in 1907 in Henrik Ibsen's The Pretenders at the National Theater in Bergen, where he continued to perform. He was also engaged with the New Theater in Oslo and the Trøndelag Theater.

Mowinckel-Nilsen made his film debut in 1927 in the silent film Madame besøker Oslo. He later appeared in the sound films Op med hodet! (1933) and Sankt Hans fest (1947).

== Filmography ==
- 1927: Madame besøker Oslo as Freddie Juul
- 1933: Op med hodet! as the theater director
- 1942: Jeg drepte! as the hotel director
- 1947: Sankt Hans fest as Løvdahl, a professor
