= Liv Uchermann Selmer =

Norwegian actress (1893–1983)

- Born: January 7, 1893; Kristiania (now Oslo), Norway
- Died: January 24, 1983 (aged 90); Oslo, Norway
- Resting place: Vestre gravlund
- Occupation: Actress
- Spouse: Alfred Gjems Selmer
- Father: Karl Uchermann

Liv Uchermann Selmer (January 7, 1893 – January 24, 1983) was a Norwegian actress.

Selmer was born in Kristiania (now Oslo), the daughter of Karl Kristian Uchermann (1855–1940) and Bolette Hermana Schnitler (1864–1939). She married the actor Alfred Gjems Selmer (1893–1919).

She debuted at the National Theatre in Oslo in 1913 as the wicked fairy Mørkøie in the Norwegian translation of Zachris Topelius's play Sleeping Beauty (Finnish: Prinsessa Ruusunen). For the first 15 years of her career, she was engaged with various theaters in Oslo, Bergen, Trondheim, and Stavanger, and she was employed by the Oslo New Theater from 1929 to 1963. Her roles included Esther in Henri Nathansen's play Indenfor Murene (Inside the Walls), the title role (and later Herlofs-Marte) in Hans Wiers-Jenssen's play Anne Pedersdotter, and Mrs. Higgins in George Bernard Shaw's play Pygmalion.

Selmer appeared in several Norwegian films and performed in many broadcasts of NRK's Radio Theater. She played Eline in Henrik Ibsen's Lady Inger of Ostrat at the Central Theater in a production in which Agnes Mowinckel played the title role. The production premiered on November 17, 1921. Two years later, Selmer played the green-clad woman in Peer Gynt at the National Theatre in Oslo. In 1928 she played Hjørdis in The Vikings at Helgeland in 44 productions across Norway during the Bjørnevik Theater's Ibsen tour.

== Filmography ==
- 1938: Ungen as Lagreta, Julius's mother
- 1940: Tante Pose as the provost's wife
- 1940: Tørres Snørtevold as Mrs. Thorsen
- 1942: Den farlige leken as the cleaning woman
- 1942: Jeg drepte! as the head nurse
- 1943: Sangen til livet as Mrs. Kamp, Eli Braa's mother
- 1943: Vigdis as Minda Bjørkli
- 1944: Kommer du, Elsa? as Miss Enger
- 1948: Den hemmelighetsfulle leiligheten as the housekeeper
- 1951: Dei svarte hestane as Inger
- 1952: Trine! as Aunt Andrea
- 1959: 5 loddrett as a maid
- 1959: Støv på hjernen
- 1961: Sønner av Norge
- 1964: Klokker i måneskinn as a chambermaid
- 1965: Hjelp – vi får leilighet!
