= Einar Vaage =

Norwegian actor

- Born: March 1, 1889; Hamar, Norway
- Died: June 11, 1973 (aged 84); Oslo, Norway
- Occupation: Actor

Einar Vaage (March 1, 1889 – June 11, 1973) was a Norwegian actor.

Vaage was active in Oslo from 1921 onward, where he was engaged with the Central Theater (from 1925 to 1931) and the Oslo New Theater. The comedy roles that Vaage played include the clerk Styver in Henrik Ibsen's play Love's Comedy.

Vaage appeared in 49 Norwegian films. He played bit roles in most of them. Waage debuted in the silent film Madame besøker Oslo in 1927, and he played one of the lead roles in Sangen om Rondane in 1934, which was one of the first sound films in Norway. He is probably best remembered for his portrayal of Judge Nicolai Bals in Tante Pose (1940). Vaage's last film role was in the 1964 comedy Husmorfilmen høsten 1964.

== Selected filmography ==
- 1927: Madame besøker Oslo as Wagelsteen, a banker
- 1934: Op med hodet! as an audience member
- 1934: Sangen om Rondane as the wholesaler
- 1936: Dyrk jorden! as Ola Engset
- 1939: Familien på Borgan as a carpenter
- 1940: Tante Pose as Judge Nicolai Bals
- 1941: Hansen og Hansen as a board member
- 1942: Det æ'kke te å tru as Storm, director
- 1943: Sangen til livet as Brahm, a lawyer
- 1943: Trysil-Knut as Crown the attorney
- 1943: Den nye lægen as Mayor
- 1944: Kommer du, Elsa? as the senior physician
- 1946: Om kjærligheten synger de as Beine
- 1948: Den hemmelighetsfulle leiligheten as the expedition leader
- 1949: Døden er et kjærtegn as Toresen, a mechanic
- 1949: Svendsen går videre
- 1950: To mistenkelige personer as a tramp
- 1951: Skadeskutt as the psychiatric hospital director
- 1953: Skøytekongen
- 1955: Hjem går vi ikke as Olsen, a caretaker
- 1955: Savnet siden mandag as Haugen, the police lieutenant
- 1963: Freske fraspark as the father-in-law
- 1964: Husmorfilmen høsten 1964
