= Familien på Borgan =

- Directed by: Helge Lunde
- Written by: Helge Lunde
- Produced by: Helge Lunde
- Starring: Victor Bernau; Harald Steen; Alf Sommer; Joachim Holst-Jensen
- Cinematography: Reidar Lund
- Music by: Jolly Kramer-Johansen
- Distributed by: Triangel Film AS
- Release date: January 23, 1939
- Running time: 92 minutes
- Country: Norway
- Language: Norwegian

Familien på Borgan (The Family at Borgan) is a 1939 Norwegian drama film. It was directed by Helge Lunde.

== Cast ==
- Victor Bernau as Halvor Berg, a farm manager
- Harald Steen as Borgan, a wholesaler
- Joachim Holst-Jensen as Cohn, a lawyer
- Lillemor von Hanno as Marie Berg
- Georg Løkkeberg as Knut Borgan
- Wenche Klouman as Anne, Berg's daughter
- Thomas Thomassen as Borgan, a wholesaler
- Eva Steen as the wholesaler's wife
- Astri Steiwer as Lillemor Borgan
- Vivi Schøyen as Åse Borgan
- Per Schrøder-Nilsen as Victor Faber
- Alfred Solaas as Erik Nelson
- Pehr Qværnstrøm as Ola Bråten
- Turid Haaland as Gurine Plassen
- Alf Sommer as Nils Moen
- Berit Alten as a girl
- Henny Skjønberg as an old woman
- Einar Vaage as a carpenter
