= Jeppe på bjerget (1933 film) =

1933 film

- Cinematic poster
- Directed by: Per Aabel; Harry Ivarson
- Written by: Ludvig Holberg; Leif Sinding; Harry Ivarson
- Based on: Ludvig Holberg's play Jeppe på bjerget
- Produced by: Leif Sinding
- Starring: Hauk Aabel; Lydia Opøien; Thomas Thomassen; Erling Drangsholt; Ellen Sinding; Einar Tveito; Elsa Sandø
- Cinematography: Reidar Lund
- Edited by: Harry Ivarson; Leif Sinding
- Music by: Alf Peaters
- Distributed by: Viking-Film A/S
- Release date: 1933
- Running time: 83 minutes
- Country: Norway
- Language: Norwegian

Jeppe på bjerget (English: Jeppe on the Hill or Jeppe of the Hill) is a Norwegian film from 1933 based on Ludvig Holberg's play Jeppe på bjerget.

The film was directed by Per Aabel and Harry Ivarson. Per's father Hauk Aabel played the starring role as Jeppe; it has been extremely unusual in Norwegian cinema for a son to direct a film with his father in a leading role. The film was produced by Leif Sinding, the sets were designed by Egil Sætren, and Fritz Gebhardt was responsible for the sound recording.

== Plot ==
Jeppe is a poor farmer who drinks too much. His wife, Nille, is strict and often beats him with a stick called "Master Erik." One day it is market day, and Nille tells Jeppe that he must buy two pounds of green soap. On the way, Jeppe visits the cobbler Jacob, hoping he will give him a shilling of liquor on credit. But Jacob the cobbler will not give Jeppe credit, and instead, Jeppe spends some of the money intended for the soap. On the way from the cobbler, he thinks he would like to have another shilling's worth of liquor and he goes back. There he drinks away several shillings and gets drunk. When he is taken out of Jacob's house, his legs are unable to hold him anymore. He falls over and remains lying there.

Baron Nilius and his entourage are out walking and discover Jeppe lying on the ground. The lackey Erik recognizes him and suggests that they play a joke on Jeppe. He suggests that they remove his clothes and place him in the baron's best bed and in the morning, when he wakes up, they will pretend he is the baron. Then, when he believes he is the baron, they will get him drunk again, dress him in his old clothes, and put him back where they found him. Then he will imagine that he had been in Paradise. The baron and the others think the idea is good one, and so they carry it out.

Jeppe wakes up in the baron's fine bed. He is confused and does not know who he is. Could it be a dream? Can he be in Paradise? Is he an emperor? Eventually, he tells the chamberlain that he is not the baron, but Jeppe Nielsen. Then the chamberlain sends for two doctors. The two doctors manage to convince Jeppe that he is the baron and that the rest is only his imagination.

Jeppe sits down to eat. He blows his nose with his fingers and eats with his hands, and he consumes large amounts of food. He mistreats the baron's servants. Jeppe demands that they return the rings the baron has given them. He says that they should have no salary and that the bailiff should be hanged. He also summons the bailiff's wife and wants to eat with her. Jeppe becomes increasingly drunk, and finally, he falls down in a drunken stupor. Then the baron, who has played a servant, and his helpers put Jeppe on a dung heap wearing his old clothes.

Jeppe wakes up on the dung heap. Disappointed, he determined that he is once again the old Jeppe. Nille is looking for Jeppe and finds him sleeping. She beats him with Master Erik and demands to know why he did not buy the soap. He says he was busy in Paradise, but of course she does not believe him.

Three armed men take Jeppe to the court, where he is accused of sneaking into the baron's house, wearing his clothes, and tyrannizing his servants. Jeppe is sentenced to die by poisoning and then a gallows is set up. Before he dies, Jeppe asks for some liquor. The judge pours the poison—which is really just a tranquilizer—into the liquor.

While Jeppe is hanging on the gallows, Nille cries and says she regrets that she was so hard on him. Jeppe wakes up from his sleep and starts talking to her. Both believe he is a ghost until the judge says he is really alive. Jeppe is happy, and the judge gives him four rigsdaler to enjoy. At the same time, he says he should let him know if his wife beats him. Jeppe then travels to Jacob the cobbler's house, where he drinks twelve shillings' worth of liquor.

== Cast ==
- Hauk Aabel as Jeppe
- Lydia Opøien as Nille
- Thomas Thomassen as Jacob the cobbler
- Erling Drangsholt as the baron
- Ellen Sinding as the baron's girlfriend
- Einar Tveito as Jesper the bailiff
- Elsa Sandø as the bailiff's wife
- Toralf Sandø as Per Degn
- Joachim Holst-Jensen as a friend of the baron
- Andreas Aabel as the cobbler's apprentice
- Carl Hagerup Aspevold as a lackey
- Ragna Bulie as a friend of the baron
- Sophus Dahl as a farmer
- Leif Enger as Musicus
- Arne Kleve as a farmer
- Birger Lødner as a lackey
- Rudolf Mjølstad as a farmer
- Thorleif Reiss as Victor
- Nanna Stenersen as a friend of the baron
- Leif Juster as an actor (not credited)
