= Gjest Baardsen (film) =

- Directed by: Tancred Ibsen
- Written by: Tancred Ibsen
- Produced by: Tancred Ibsen
- Starring: Alfred Maurstad; Vibeke Falk; Joachim Holst-Jensen; Lauritz Falk; Jens Holstad; Karl Bergmann; Sophus Dahl; Lars Tvinde; Martin Linge
- Cinematography: Per G. Jonson; Ulf Greber
- Music by: Adolf Kristoffer Nielsen
- Distributed by: Norsk Film A/S
- Release date: 1939
- Running time: 99 minutes
- Country: Norway
- Language: Norwegian

Gjest Baardsen is a Norwegian film from 1939 written and directed by Tancred Ibsen. Alfred Maurstad played the title role. The film is based on the life of the outlaw Gjest Baardsen, but it is a blend of fact and fiction. The plot is taken from a chapbook published by Holger Sinding under the pseudonym Halle Sira.

The film was shot at the Fuhr farm in Luster Municipality, at Turtagrø in the Sognefjellet mountains in Luster Municipality, and at Videseter in the Strynefjellet mountains in Stryn Municipality.

The film was screened in the United States with English subtitles in the 1940s.

== Plot ==
The film is set in a time of famine. Norway has been at war with England and Sweden, and times are difficult. Gjest Baardsen has gotten into trouble with the law, apparently due to a trifle. But Gjest breaks free, and instead it is the sheriff that is handcuffed while Gjest escapes.

== Reviews ==
Newspapers have written the following about the film: "Meet the master thief and the folk hero Gjest Baardsen, who steals from the rich and gives to the poor. He tricks the constable and bailiff into a fight, and no prisons or chains can hold him." "Maurstad plays the folk hero with an obsessive freshness, with daring moves and a Hardanger fiddle, and escapes over fjords and mountains."

== Cast ==
- Alfred Maurstad as Gjest Baardsen
- Vibeke Falk as Anna Reinche
- Joachim Holst-Jensen as Mons Peder Michelsen, the jailer
- Lauritz Falk as an officer
- Jens Holstad as an officer
- Karl Bergmann as Reincke, the customs officer
- Sophus Dahl as a constable
- Lars Tvinde as a constable
- Sigurd Magnussøn as a constable
- Henny Skjønberg as Karen
- Henrik Børseth as a farmer
- Edvard Drabløs as a fisherman
- Martin Linge as a fisherman
- Einar Tveito as Mathias Strandvik
- Ole Leikvang as a farmer
- Johannes Jensen as Johannes, the constable's officer
- Victor Ivarson as the inspector
- Johan Hauge as the judge
- Hans Bille as the chief of police
- Thorleif Mikkelsen as a policeman

== Songs ==
- "Fjellsangen" (lyrics by Holger Sinding, melody by Adolf Kristoffer Nielsen), sung by Alfred Maurstad
- "Svarterabben" (lyrics and melody by Alfred Maurstad), sung by Alfred Maurstad

Alfred Maustad and an orchestra directed by Adolf Kristoffer Nielsen also recorded these two songs in Oslo on February 20, 1940. They were released on the Telefunken 78 rpm record T-8261, and the first song also on the Sonora 78 rpm record 3748.
