= Arthur Barking =

Norwegian actor and scenographer (1891–1949)

- Born: November 18, 1891; Kristiania (now Oslo), Norway
- Died: May 6, 1949 (aged 57)
- Resting place: Nordstrand Church, Oslo, Norway
- Occupation(s): Actor and scenographer

Arthur Barking (November 18, 1891 – May 6, 1949) was a Norwegian actor and scenographer.

== Filmography ==
=== Actor ===
- 1917: De forældreløse as Store-Jens
- 1918: Vor tids helte as Wærn, the chief engineer
- 1919: Æresgjesten as Frank
- 1920: Kaksen på Øverland as Torgrim as an adult
- 1926: Simen Mustrøens besynderlige opplevelser as the bailiff
- 1927: Fjeldeventyret as Ole Sørbraaten
- 1927: Syv dager for Elisabeth as the hotel concierge
- 1932: Fantegutten as Boris, a Gypsy
- 1939: Valfångare as Store-Knut
- 1943: Den nye lægen as the master builder

=== Scenographer ===
- 1927: Syv dager for Elisabeth
- 1937: Fant
