= Sankt Hans fest =

- Directed by: Toralf Sandø
- Written by: Victor Borg
- Based on: Alexander Kielland's novel Sankt Hans fest
- Produced by: Toralf Sandø
- Starring: Johannes Eckhoff; Jon Lennart Mjøen; Claus Wiese; Erling Drangsholt; Sigurd Konrad Magnussøn; Else Heiberg
- Cinematography: Per G. Jonson
- Edited by: Olav Engebretsen
- Music by: Gunnar Sønstevold
- Release date: 1947
- Running time: 88 minutes
- Country: Norway
- Language: Norwegian

Sankt Hans fest (St. John's Festival or Saint Hans' Celebration) is a Norwegian film directed by Toralf Sandø. It premiered on April 7, 1947. It is based on the 1887 novel Sankt Hans Fest by Alexander Kielland.

== Plot ==
The film follows the plot of the novel. The dour priest Kruse is played by Tore Foss, who opposes the business establishment's town party, which is planned by Johannes Eckhoff as Garman, Jon Lennart Mjøen as Randulf, Claus Wiese as Holck, Erling Drangsholt as the bank manager, and Sigurd Magnussøn as the county governor. Pressure is placed on both sides by Else Heiberg, who is Randulf's wife.

== Reception ==
A review of the film was generally positive, but it criticized the lighting. The review stated that the party committee should have been more jolly, and that the best among the actors was Egil Hjorth-Jenssen, who "stands in a special class as the chief 'rabbit.'"

== Music ==
The song St. Hans vals (Saint John's Waltz) was written for the film by Gunnar Sønstevold. It was recorded by the Maj Sønstevold Ensemble in Oslo on April 16, 1947. The song was released on a 78 rpm disc (Musica A-8515).
