= Kommer du, Elsa? =

- Directed by: Toralf Sandø
- Written by: Victor Borg; Toralf Sandø
- Based on: Victor Borg's play Kommer du, Elsa?
- Starring: Aase Bye; Erling Drangsholt; Harald Schwenzen
- Cinematography: Reidar Lund
- Edited by: Olav Engebretsen
- Music by: Jolly Kramer-Johansen
- Distributed by: Alliance Film A/S
- Release date: March 20, 1944
- Running time: 105 minutes
- Country: Norway
- Language: Norwegian

Kommer du, Elsa? (Are You Coming, Elsa?) is a Norwegian drama film from 1944 directed by Toralf Sandø. The script was written by Sandø and Victor Borg, and it is based on Borg's play Kommer du, Elsa? The cast includes Aase Bye, Erling Drangsholt, and Harald Schwenzen.

== Plot ==
Leif Rieber is a famous conductor. He has a promising young son who plays the violin, and his father features him as a soloist in one of his major concerts. The son has tuberculosis and dies during the concert. The father blames himself for the son's death and takes to drinking. Later he is affected by marital problems and illness.

== Cast ==
- Aase Bye as Elsa Rieber, Leif Rieber's wife
- Erling Drangsholt as Leif Rieber, a musician
- Harald Schwenzen as Øistein Werner, Rieber's friend
- Bjarne Larsen as Harald Rieber, Elsa and Leif Rieber's son
- Liv Blom as Kari, Harald's friend
- Oscar Egede-Nissen as a vagabond
- Tore Foss as Smith, a doctor and patient
- Gunvor Hall as Mrs. Kramer, a patient at the sanatorium
- Erling Hanson as Bjerke, a doctor at the sanatorium
- Alfred Helgeby as Jørgensen, a caretaker at the sanatorium
- Birger Lødner as Borgen, a doctor
- Gunnar Olram as the professor, a patient at the sanatorium
- Erna Schøyen as Kristine, a maid at the Rieber home
- Liv Uchermann Selmer as Miss Enger
- Einar Vaage as the senior physician
- Aage Wallin as the concertmaster and violinist at Aulaen Hall
