= Fager er lien =

1925 film

- Directed by: Harry Ivarson
- Written by: Harry Ivarson
- Produced by: Erling Eriksen; Leif Sinding
- Starring: Aase Bye; Oscar Larsen; Olafr Havrevold; Finn Lange; Didi Holtermann
- Cinematography: Johannes Bentzen
- Edited by: Harry Ivarson
- Distributed by: Skandinavisk film-central
- Release date: 1925
- Running time: 92 minutes
- Country: Norway
- Language: Norwegian

Fager er lien (Fair Is the Hillside) is a Norwegian romantic silent film from 1925 directed by Harry Ivarson (his second feature film after his debut with Til sæters in 1924). Ivarson also wrote the screenplay. The film belongs to the national romantic period of the 1920s. The title is a reference to the thirteenth-century Njáls saga.

Before the film was released, six meters of footage showing dancing were edited out. The film is now considered lost.

== Plot ==
Aase lives with her grandfather in a cabin on a hill. Life seems sad and poor to her. The best thing she knows is to sit at dusk and dream. Aase is fond of Kaare, who works on a large estate nearby. The estate owner, Fredrik-August Reventlow, is also interested in Aase and does not give up even though she has rejected his invitations. Fredrik-August arranges a party at the estate, and Aase is asked to serve at the party. She is attacked by the landlord and later gives birth to a child.

== Cast ==
- Aase Bye as Aase Nordhaug
- Oscar Larsen as Aase's grandfather
- Olafr Havrevold as Kaare
- Finn Lange as Kristian, a Salvation Army member
- Didi Holtermann as Hulda Stiansen
- Oscar Magnussen as Oskar
- Frithjof Fearnley as Fredrik-August Reventlow, an estate owner
- Ruth Brünings-Sandvik as Mademoiselle Wadjewska
- Rebekka Lie as a prostitute
- Britt Eriksen as a little girl
- Erling Knudsen
- Unni Torkildsen
