= Vibeke Falk =

Norwegian actress (1918–2011)

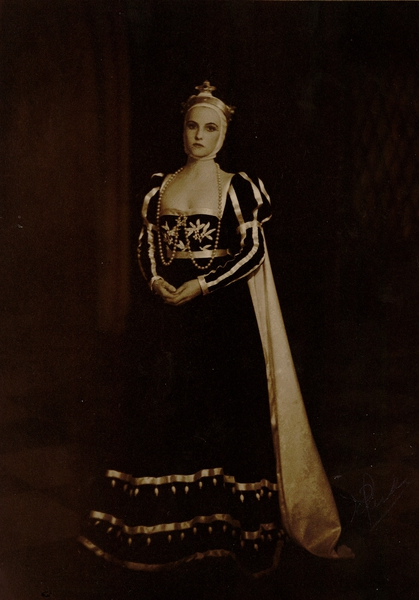
- Portrait by Ernest Rude, c. 1940
- Born: 27 September 1918
- Died: 9 October 2011 (aged 93)
- Occupation: Actress
- Spouse: Lauritz Falk

Vibeke Falk (née Mowinckel; 27 September 1918 – 9 October 2011) was a Norwegian actress.

== Biography ==
She was a daughter of the wholesaler Thorolf Beyer Mowinckel and Jenny Modesta Fasmer. From 1937 to 1950, she was married to the actor Lauritz Falk (1909–1990).

Falk made her stage debut at the Søilen Theater in 1938 and her film debut in Gjest Baardsen in 1939. From 1939 to 1942, she worked at the National Theater in Oslo, and then at the Trøndelag Theater in Trondheim from 1952 to 1953 and again from 1958 to 1960. From 1960 to 1968 she was at the National Theater in Bergen, and after that she worked freelance. She was featured in the role of Anna Reinche in the Norwegian film classic Gjest Baardsen from 1939 directed by Tancred Ibsen.

In the 1940s she appeared in the Swedish films Nygifta (1941), The Old Clock at Ronneberga (1944), Between Brothers (1946), and Singoalla (1949).
