= William Ivarson =

Norwegian actor

- Born: March 9, 1867; Horten, Norway
- Died: November 5, 1934 (aged 67); Bergen, Norway
- Occupation: Actor
- Years active: 1899–1934

William Ivarson (March 9, 1867 – November 5, 1934) was a Norwegian actor.

Ivarson was born in Horten. From 1899 until his death, he was one of the leading actors at the National Theater in Bergen. Ivarson was an energetic and versatile character actor. Among his foremost roles were Sir Andrew Aguecheek in William Shakespeare's Twelfth Night, the title role in Ludvig Holberg's Jeppe on the Hill, Hjalmar Ekdal in Henrik Ibsen's The Wild Duck, and Celius in Nils Kjær's Det lykkelige valg.

Ivarson also appeared in several silent films. He was the father of the film director and screenwriter Harry Ivarson.

== Filmography ==
- 1919: Sons of Ingmar
- 1920: The Parson's Widow
