= Jeg drepte! =

- Directed by: Toralf Sandø
- Written by: Victor Borg; Toralf Sandø
- Based on: Victor Borg's play Jeg drepte!
- Produced by: George Willoughby
- Starring: Rolf Christensen; Tore Foss; Guri Stormoen; Sigrun Otto; Gunvor Hall; Joachim Holst-Jensen; Jack Fjeldstad
- Cinematography: Reidar Lund
- Edited by: Olav Engebretsen
- Music by: Jolly Kramer-Johansen
- Distributed by: Capitol Produksjon A/S
- Release date: 1942
- Running time: 99 minutes
- Country: Norway
- Language: Norwegian

Jeg drepte! (I Have Killed!) is a Norwegian film directed by Toralf Sandø. It premiered on August 17, 1942.

== Plot ==
A doctor is operating on a male patient. Under anesthesia, the man reveals that he is in a relationship with the doctor's wife. After the operation, complications arise, the man dies, and the doctor is convinced that he is the one that killed the man. In order to rid himself of the obsession, the hospital decides that he should do a similar operation and succeed with it. Because they do not dare risk any of the regular patients, the doctor's wife is selected for the procedure without him knowing who he is operating on.

== Cast ==
- Rolf Christensen: Gunnar Bøhmer, a doctor
- Tore Foss: Kristian Solberg
- Guri Stormoen: Mrs. Fredriksen
- Sigrun Otto: Miss Bull
- Gunvor Hall: Mrs. Johansen
- Joachim Holst-Jensen: Fredriksen
- Jack Fjeldstad: Bagge, a doctor
- Synnøve Øian: Berit, a nurse
- Johannes Eckhoff: Berg, a doctor
- Oscar Amundsen: Bjørnstad, a doctor
- Liv Uchermann Selmer: head nurse
- Grace Grung: surgery nurse
- Ingeborg Cook: Agnete Larsen
- Edel Eriksen: Miss Berger
- Vivi Schøyen: office nurse
- Arne Andresen: Frits
- Reidun Ofstad: anesthesiology nurse
- Johanne Voss: Mrs. Solberg
- Erna Enersen: Cecilie, a nurse
- Jens Gundersen: Hagen, a doctor
- Erling Drangsholt: head physician Christensen
- Wenche Foss: Liv Bøhmer

== Music ==
- "Mitt hjertes sang" (The Song of my Heart; melody: Jolly Kramer-Johansen, lyrics: Arne Paasche Aasen). Performed by Kramer Johansens Filmorkester with Ivar Cederholm. Recorded in Oslo in November 1942. Released on the 78 rpm record Columbia GN 836 (Side B).
