= Fant (film) =

- Directed by: Tancred Ibsen
- Written by: Tancred Ibsen
- Based on: Gabriel Scott's novel Fant
- Produced by: Tancred Ibsen
- Starring: Alfred Maurstad; Sonja Wigert; Guri Stormoen; Lars Tvinde; Oscar Egede-Nissen
- Cinematography: Adrian Bjurman
- Edited by: Titus Vibe-Müller
- Music by: Thode Fagelund
- Distributed by: Norsk Film A/S
- Release date: December 26, 1937
- Running time: 95 minutes
- Country: Norway
- Language: Norwegian

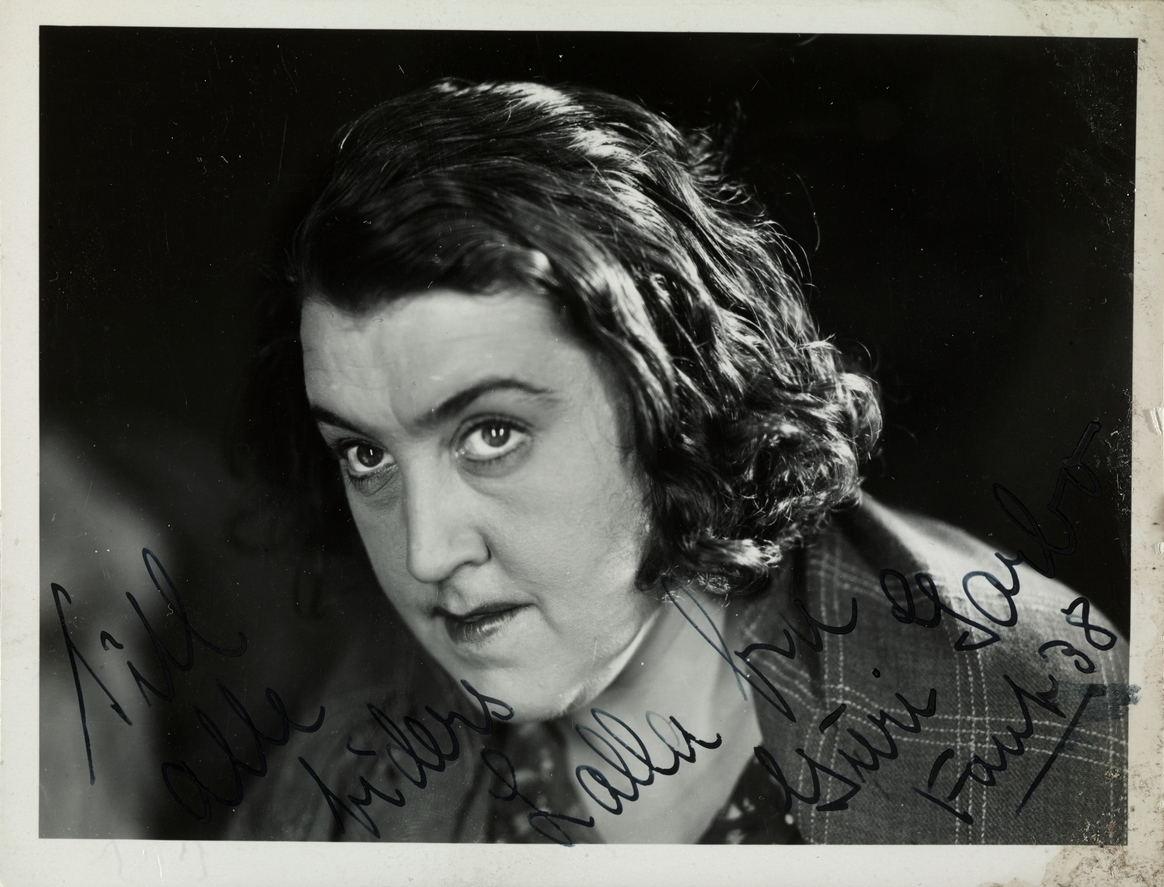
Guri Stormoen in Fant

Fant (The Gypsy) is a Norwegian film from 1937 based on Gabriel Scott's 1928 novel of the same name. The film was directed by Tancred Ibsen, who also wrote the script for the film. The film premiered on December 26, 1937 at the Eldorado Cinema in Oslo.

The film is about a young orphaned girl Josefa (played by Sonja Wigert), who escapes from her wicked uncle (played by Einar Tveito) and eventually falls in love with a Roma named Fændrik (played by Alfred Maurstad). Fændrik belongs to a seafaring group of Roma that travel around Southern Norway, and in many ways the film is typical of the contemporary view of the Roma people and their culture.

Guri Stormoen, who played the role of Mathilde, said that during the production her opponent Alfred Maurstad had stabbed her in the stomach with a knife during the filming of a fight scene, and that director Ibsen had ordered the actors to "fight seriously, otherwise it would look idiotic, of course. And with that, we had to yell at each other, and then—it was absolutely awful!" The actors had to lie in their beds the day after this scene was filmed, according to Stormoen, because they were battered and full of bruises.

Fant was received well by both the critics and the public when it was released, and Alfred Maurstad in particular was praised for his role as the ruthless layabout Fændrik.

== Cast ==
- Alfred Maurstad as Fændrik
- Sonja Wigert as Josefa
- Lars Tvinde as Sebaldus
- Guri Stormoen as Mathilde
- Oscar Egede-Nissen as Oscar
- Henny Skjønberg as Tobine
- Carsten Winger as Halvor
- Marit Halset as Halvor's wife
- Sigurd Magnussøn as Peder
- Karin Meyer as Peder's wife
- Toralv Maurstad as a boy
- Espen Skjønberg as a boy
- Joachim Holst-Jensen as Uncle Søren
- Gøril Havrevold as Johanne
- Abigael Magnussøn as Johanne's mother
- Eugen Skjønberg as the sheriff
- Einar Tveito as Josefa's uncle
- Gudrun Tvinde as a fisherwoman
- Aagot Didriksen as a farmwoman

== Sequel ==
Leif Sinding made a sequel to Tancred Ibsen's Fant in 1943 or 1944. This sequel was titled Fant II or Josepha. However, the film was never released, and only fragments of it have been preserved.

== Literature ==
Fant is discussed in Thor Gotaas's comprehensive 2003 work Taterne: livskampen og eventyret (Travelers: The Struggle for Life and the Adventure), in which the author discusses the extent to which the film—and Gabriel Scott's novel of the same name—provides an authentic image of Roma culture.
