= Finn Lange =

Norwegian actor

- Born: October 10, 1895; Gjøvik, Norway
- Died: December 7, 1976 (aged 81)
- Occupation: Actor

Finn Lange (October 10, 1895 – December 7, 1976) was a Norwegian actor. He was born in Gjøvik. He performed in theater (at the Trondheim National Theater and the National Theater in Oslo) and appeared in several films.

== Filmography ==
- 1970: Døden i gatene
- 1943: Sangen til livet as Jørgen Roll, a factory director
- 1938: Eli Sjursdotter as the priest
- 1931: Den store barnedåpen as the chaplain
- 1925: Fager er lien as Kristian, a Salvation Army member
