= Sæbjørn Buttedahl =

Norwegian actor and sculptor

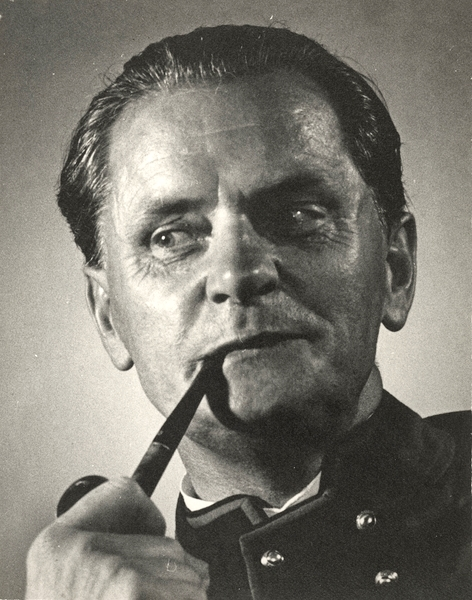
- Born: Nils Sæbjørn Buttedahl; 10 November 1876; Lier, Buskerud, Norway
- Died: 10 July 1960 (aged 83); San Diego, California, United States
- Occupations: Actor, Sculptor
- Years active: 1896–1955
- Spouse: Clare Petrea Margrethe Benelli
- Children: Ellen Sinding
- Relatives: Leif Sinding (son-in-law)

Sæbjørn Buttedahl (10 November 1876 – 10 July 1960) was a Norwegian stage and film actor who later found prominence as a sculptor.

== Stage and film career ==
Nils Sæbjørn Buttedahl was born in Lier, Norway and began his career as a stage actor in 1896 at the age of twenty. From 1907 to 1924 he was engaged at the Centralteatret (Central Theater) in Oslo (then known as Kristiana). He appeared in a number of stage plays by Henrik Ibsen, and appeared onstage with such eminent Norwegian actors of the era as Agnes Mowinckel and Martin Linge.

Buttedahl appeared in three feature-length silent films during his career as an actor. Two of these films, 1926's Simen Mustrøens besynderlige opplevelser and 1927's Den glade enke i Trangvik were directed by Harry Ivarson. His final film role was in the 1927 romantic drama Fjeldeventyret (A Mountain Romance), directed by his son-in-law Leif Sinding.

== Sculpture ==
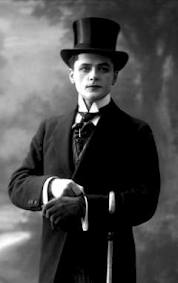
Buttedahl ca. 1900

During his time as an actor, Buttedahl also began a career as a sculptor, mainly as a sculptor of busts and almost exclusively sculpted notable theater personalities. He debuted his work at the Autumn Exhibition in Oslo in 1912. Notable works in the public collection include:

- Nationaltheatret (National Theater), Oslo: busts of Jens Selmer (marble) and Ingolf Schanche (bronze, 1921)
- Vestre gravlund (Western Cemetery), Oslo: bust of Fredrik Wilhelm Wingar (bronze, 1923)
- Oslo Theatre Museum, Oslo: busts of Kaja Eide Norena, Ingolf Schanche and Halvor Urdahl
- Copenhagen Theater Museum, Copenhagen: bust of Peter Fjelstrup (alabaster, 1913)
- Oslo Bymuseum (Oslo City Museum), Oslo: busts of Jens Selmer (alabaster) and Ole Thommessen (alabaster)
- Drammens Faste Galleri (Drammen Fixed Gallery), Drammen: bust of Harald Otto (alabaster, 1914)

== Personal life ==
Sæbjørn Buttedahl married Danish stage actress Clare Petrea Margrethe "Maggie" Benelli (1870–1933). They had one daughter, Ellen (Buttedahl) Sinding (1899–1980), who married film director Leif Sinding and became a film actress and dancer.

== Later life ==
In 1926, Buttedahl emigrated to the United States, where he toured the country with appearances reciting poems and singing folk songs. He settled in San Diego, California, where he died in 1960 at age 83.
