= Song of Rondane =

1934 film by Helge Lunde

- Directed by: Helge Lunde
- Starring: Kirsten Heiberg; Georg Løkkeberg; Einar Vaage
- Cinematography: Reidar Lund
- Music by: Tønnes Birknes
- Production company: Viking-Film
- Release date: 16 November 1934
- Running time: 86 minutes
- Country: Norway
- Language: Norwegian

Song of Rondane (Norwegian: Sangen om Rondane) is a 1934 Norwegian drama film directed by Helge Lunde and starring Kirsten Heiberg, Georg Løkkeberg and Einar Vaage.

It was shot on location in Rondane.

== Cast ==
- Kirsten Heiberg as Greta
- Georg Løkkeberg as Knut, A young herder
- Einar Vaage as The grocer
- Sonja Wigert as Astrid
- Ottar Wicklund as Hans, Knut's brother
- Arne Bang-Hansen as Erik, Greta's brother
- Ole Grepp as Petter
- Theodor Hald as The Hello-man
- Thoralf Klouman as The doctor
- Dagmar Myhrvold as Kari, Knut's mother
- Gerd-Lise Nore as Daughter of Greta
- Eva Steen as The aunt
- Einar Tveito as A horse salesman

== Bibliography ==
- Alfred Krautz. International directory of cinematographers, set- and costume designers in film, Volume 5. Saur, 1986.
