= Simen Mustrøens besynderlige opplevelser =

1926 film

- Directed by: Harry Ivarson
- Written by: Harry Ivarson
- Based on: Johan Falkberget's story Simen Mustrøen
- Produced by: Leif Sinding
- Starring: Martin Gisti; Didi Holtermann; Sophus Dahl; Haakon Hjelde; Kolbjørn Skjefstad; Arne Svendsen; Ellen Astrup; Arthur Barking; Sæbjørn Buttedahl; Marit Haugan; Oscar Magnussen; Helga Rydland
- Cinematography: Erling Knudsen; Johannes Bentzen
- Edited by: Harry Ivarson
- Distributed by: Skandinavisk film-central
- Release date: 1926
- Running time: 82 minutes
- Country: Norway
- Language: Norwegian

Simen Mustrøens besynderlige oplevelser (Simen Mustrøen's Strange Adventures) is a Norwegian film from 1926 based on a story by Johan Falkberget. The film was directed by Harry Ivarson with cinematography by Erling Knudsen and Johannes Bentzen. It is now considered lost.

== Plot ==
The film tells the story of a woodcarver named Simen, who is cheated by a wealthy farmer out of some silver that he has inherited. Simen starts a rumor about his own death, and he starts acting like a ghost. After frightening the wealthy farmer and the sexton, who has begun wooing Simen's wife, the wealthy farmer's fraud is discovered, and the bailiff arrests him. Simen is "resurrected" from the dead and is recognized for his artwork.

== Cast ==
- Martin Gisti as Simen Mustrøen
- Didi Holtermann as Bertille, Simen's wife
- Sophus Dahl as Per Pikajord
- Haakon Hjelde as Helge Hjort, the district judge
- Kolbjørn Skjefstad as Lars Kaldbækken, the sexton
- Arne Svendsen as Theodor, the priest
- Ellen Astrup as Edith, the priest's daughter
- Arthur Barking as the bailiff
- Sæbjørn Buttedahl as Ola, a farm boy
- Marit Haugan as Anne, a servant girl
- Oscar Magnussen as a farm boy
- Helga Rydland
