= 5 år – som vi så dem =

- Directed by: Per G. Jonson; Bredo Lind
- Written by: Asbjørn Barlaup
- Produced by: Bredo Lind; Per G. Jonson
- Starring: Ola Isene; King Haakon VII; King Olav V Hartvig Kiran; Reidar Lunde; Hans Jacob Nilsen; Lars Nordrum
- Cinematography: Bredo Lind; Per G. Jonson
- Edited by: Olav Engebretsen
- Music by: Thomas Beck; Jolly Kramer-Johansen; Sverre Arvid Bergh
- Distributed by: Norsk Film AS
- Release date: October 9, 1947
- Running time: 82 minutes
- Country: Norway
- Language: Norwegian

5 år – som vi så dem (Five Years, As We Saw Them) is a Norwegian documentary from 1947, directed by Per G. Jonson and Bredo Lind.

The film is about Norwegians' efforts outside Norway during the Second World War II. King Haakon VII and Crown Prince Olav are seen in the film. Ola Isene is the narrator, and other voices in the film are Hartvig Kiran, Reidar Lunde, Hans Jacob Nilsen, and Lars Nordrum.
