= Søilen Teater =

Theatre in Oslo

Coordinates: 59°55′02″N 10°44′38″E

Søilen Teater was a theatre that opened in Oslo in 1930. It was managed by Sophus Dahl until 1932. It was then a supporting stage for Chat Noir until 1934. From 1934 to 1939 the theatre was run by Henry Gleditsch, and from 1939 it was run by Aud Ricther. From 1942 it housed Leif Juster's stage Edderkoppen Theatre, and in 1945 it housed Studioteatret.

Among actors who made their stage debut at Søilen Teater were Wenche Foss, Vibeke Falk, Svend von Düring, Jon Lennart Mjøen, Carsten Byhring, Jack Fjeldstad, Carsten Winger, Kolbjørn Brenda, Ragnhild Michelsen, Siri Rom, and Georg Richter.
