= Ellen Sinding =

Norwegian actress and dancer

- Born: April 17, 1899; Haugesund, Norway
- Died: April 28, 1980 (aged 81)
- Occupations: Actress, dancer
- Years active: 1922–1936
- Spouse: Leif Sinding (m. 1919)
- Father: Sæbjørn Buttedahl

Ellen Sinding (née Buttedahl; April 17, 1899 – April 18, 1980) was a Norwegian actress and dancer.

Sinding was born in Haugesund, the daughter of the actor and sculptor Sæbjørn Buttedahl and the actress Clare Petrea Margrethe Benelli (1871–1933). She debuted as an actress in 1922 in the film Kjærlighet paa pinde. During the 1920s, Sinding also appeared in the films Til sæters (1924), Den nye lensmannen (1926), and Fjeldeventyret and Syv dage for Elisabeth (both in 1927). In 1932 she appeared in Fantegutten, in 1933 in Jeppe på bjerget, and in 1936 in the short film Vi vil oss et land..., which was her last film role.

Sinding was married to the film director and journalist Leif Sinding.

== Filmography ==
- 1922: Kjærlighet paa pinde as Eva Sommer
- 1924: Til sæters as Ragnhild
- 1926: Den nye lensmannen as a dancer
- 1927: Fjeldeventyret as Aagot, a mountain girl
- 1927: Syv dage for Elisabeth as Lucie Breien
- 1932: Fantegutten as Tatjana, a dancer
- 1933: Jeppe på bjerget as the baron's girlfriend
- 1936: Vi vil oss et land... as a dancer
