= Erling Drangsholt =

Norwegian actor

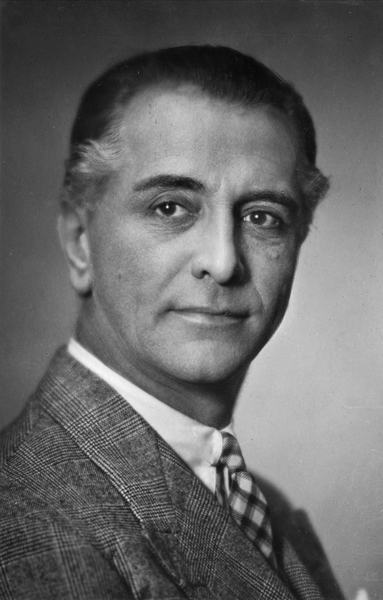
- Born: October 29, 1885; Oddernes (Kristiansand), Norway
- Died: November 20, 1950 (aged 65); Oslo, Norway
- Occupation: Actor
- Years active: 1927–1947

Erling Drangsholt (October 29, 1885 – November 20, 1950) was a Norwegian actor.

== Filmography ==
- 1927: Den glade enke i Trangvik, as engineer Vang
- 1927: Madame besøker Oslo, as Helge Wagelsten
- 1933: Jeppe på bjerget, as the Baron
- 1942: Det æ'kke te å tru, as Aalberg
- 1942: Jeg drepte!, as Christensen
- 1943: Sangen til livet, as general director Sigurd Braa
- 1944: Kommer du, Elsa?, as Leif Rieber
- 1946: To liv, as supreme court lawyer Ivar Nordgaard
- 1947: Sankt Hans fest, as bank director Christensen
