= Nanna Stenersen =

Norwegian actress (1914–1977)

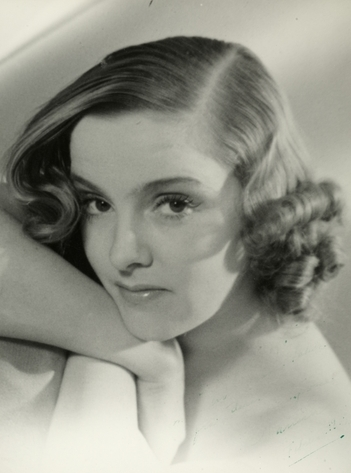
- Born: January 26, 1914; Oslo, Norway
- Died: June 22, 1977 (aged 63); Oslo, Norway
- Occupation: Actress
- Years active: 1933–1957

Inga Kristine "Nanna" Stenersen (January 26, 1914 – June 22, 1977) was a Norwegian actress.

Stenersen was born in Oslo, the daughter of the artillery captain Fredrik Christian Krohg Stenersen (1877–1965) and Regine née Johansen (1878–?). She debuted in 1933 at the Carl Johan Theater (Carl Johan Teatret) and later worked for the Central Theater and Oslo New Theater. Stenersen performed in revues, comedies, and operettas. She also appeared as a wise judge of human character in more serious roles, but she is best remembered for her appearances in Norwegian films. She died in Oslo in 1977.

== Theater roles ==
- The Threepenny Opera: Polly Peachum
- Mam'zelle Nitouche: title role
- All of Finn Bø's summer comedies

== Filmography ==
- 1933: 5 raske piger (Danish) as Irene From
- 1933: Jeppe på bjerget as a friend of the baron
- 1938: Styrman Karlssons flammor (Swedish) as Bessie Mathiesen
- 1941: Hansen og Hansen as Miss Ring
- 1942: Den farlige leken as Helene Blom
- 1951: Vi gifter oss as Babben
- 1953: Ung frue forsvunnet as Birgit Lie, a pharmacist and friend
- 1954: Kasserer Jensen as Mrs. Jensen
- 1957: Fjols til fjells as a maid
- 1959: 5 loddrett as Randi Jespersen, Knut's wife
- 1960: Millionær for en aften as Mrs. Hammer, a boarding house operator
