= Harald Steen =

Norwegian singer and actor

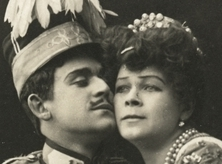
- Harald Steen and his wife at the Central Theater in 1907, performing in The Merry Widow
- Born: April 2, 1886; Kristiania, Norway
- Died: April 18, 1941 (aged 55); Oslo, Norway
- Resting place: Vestre Gravlund
- Occupation: Actor
- Spouse: Signe Heide Steen
- Children: Randi Heide Steen, Harald Heide Steen, Kari Diesen

Harald Steen (April 2, 1886 – April 18, 1941) was a Norwegian tenor and actor.

Steen made his debut at the National Theater in Oslo in 1902 and remained there until 1908. He was engaged by the Central Theater from 1908 to 1927. With his spirited mood, smooth characterization, and excellent voice, he was a key actor for much of the theater's repertoire of comedies, operettas, and operas. He made his film debut in 1916 in the Danish silent film Strandvaskeren. Harald Steen was married to the actress Signe Heide Steen, and he was the father of Randi Heide Steen, Harald Heide Steen, and Kari Diesen.

== Filmography ==
- 1916: Strandvaskeren as Hans the fisherman
- 1927: Den glade enke i Trangvik as Jørnsen, the shipowner
- 1928: Cafe X as Pålsen, the cafe owner
- 1937: Bra mennesker as Haakonsen
- 1938: Det drønner gjennom dalen as the doctor
- 1939: Familien på Borgan as Borgan, the wholesaler
- 1939: De vergeløse as the sailor
- 1940: Tørres Snørtevold as Viberg
- 1941: Gullfjellet as the bank official in Hamar
- 1941: Hansen og Hansen as the chauffeur
