= Sangen til livet =

- Directed by: Leif Sinding
- Written by: Leif Sinding
- Based on: Johan Bojer's play Sigurd Braa
- Produced by: Leif Sinding
- Starring: Erling Drangsholt; Else Budde; Finn Lange
- Cinematography: Kåre Bergstrøm
- Edited by: Olav Engebretsen
- Music by: Jolly Kramer-Johansen
- Distributed by: Skandinavisk film-central
- Release date: 1943
- Running time: 108 minutes
- Country: Norway
- Language: Norwegian

Sangen til livet (The Song of Life) is a Norwegian film from 1943 based on Johan Bojer's play Sigurd Braa. It was directed by Leif Sinding. The film premiered on October 25, 1943.

== Plot ==
The film is a melodrama about a factory director who is loved by his workers and a power struggle between a good and evil capitalist.

== Cast ==
- Erling Drangsholt as Sigurd Braa, the director general
- Else Budde as Eli Braa, his wife
- Lilleba Svenssen as Gerda Braa, his daughter
- Liv Uchermann Selmer as Mrs. Kamp, Eli Braa's mother
- Finn Lange as Jørgen Roll, a factory director
- Einar Vaage as Brahm, a lawyer
- Oscar Amundsen as Rud, overingeniør
- Folkman Schaanning as Storm, a doctor
- Joachim Holst-Jensen as Graali, an editor
- Ragnhild Østerbye as Laura Graali, the editor's wife
- Tryggve Larssen as Lars Utgaren
- Henny Skjønberg as Amanda Sivertsen, the housekeeper at the Braa home
- Gunnar Simenstad as Nordahl
- Erna Schøyen as Miss Dahle, a teacher
