= Else Heiberg =

Norwegian actress (1910–1972)

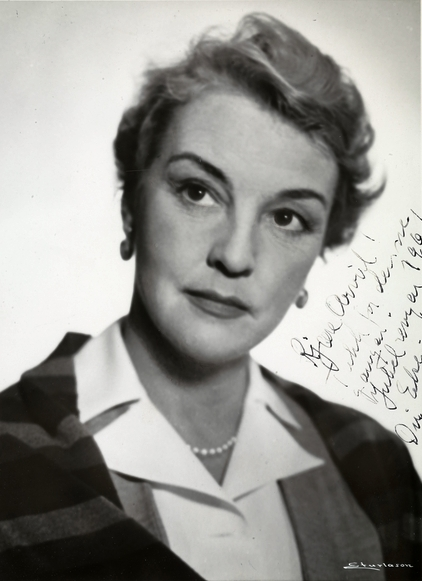
- Photograph of Heiberg from the Oslo Museum
- Born: Else Cathrine Heiberg; November 5, 1910; Kragerø, Norway
- Died: November 25, 1972 (aged 62); Oslo, Norway
- Resting place: Ris Church
- Occupation: Actress
- Spouse: Jon Lennart Mjøen
- Children: Lars Mjøen
- Parents: Sverre Heiberg (father); Johanne Marie Schweigaard (mother)
- Relatives: Kirsten Heiberg (sister)

Else Cathrine Heiberg (November 5, 1910 – November 25, 1972) was a Norwegian actress.

== Career ==
Heiberg started her professional career as a pianist and dance teacher, and she made her stage debut at Bergen's National Theater in 1934 in the role of a young boy in Finn Bø's Selv i tider som disse (Even in Times Like These). After that, she performed at Chat Noir, the Oslo New Theater, the Trøndelag Theater, and a number of other stages. From 1948 to 1951 she was engaged with Oslo's National Theater, and later again at the Oslo New Theater, before she became a permanent employee of NRK's television department for several years. From her years there she is best known for the roles as Hønse-Lovisa in the plays Ungen (The Child) and Dobbelt-Petra in Den store barnedåpen (The Great Christening), both written by Oskar Braaten, and as Meg in Brendan Behan's An Giall (The Hostage).

Else Heiberg was married to the actor Jon Lennart Mjøen, and she was the mother of the actor and comedian Lars Mjøen and the sister of actress Kirsten Heiberg.

== Filmography ==
- 1936: Morderen uten ansikt (The Murderer without a Face)
- 1936: Vi vil oss et land... (We Want Ourselves a Country), short film
- 1942: Den farlige leken (The Dangerous Game)
- 1960: Ungen (The Child), TV
- 1961: Den store barnedåpen (The Great Christening), TV
- 1961: A Night Out (Norwegian title: Går ut i kveld), TV
- 1962: Kranes konditori (Krane's Bakery Shop), TV
- 1963: Elskere (Lovers)
- 1963: Stompa selvfølgelig! (Stompa, of Course!)
- 1963: Vildanden (The Wild Duck), as Mrs. Sørby
- 1964: Nydelige nelliker (The Misfits)
- 1966: Rosmersholm, TV
- 1966: Sult (Hunger), as the landlady
