= Didi Holtermann =

Norwegian actress (1895–1975)

- Born: November 28, 1895; Oslo, Norway
- Died: December 17, 1975 (aged 80)
- Occupation: Actress

Didi Holtermann (born Dagny Borghild Ivarson, November 28, 1895 – December 17, 1975) was a Norwegian actress.

Holtermann was born in Kristiania (now Oslo). She had her film debut in 1922 in Amund Rydland's Farende folk, in which she played the role of Veronika. In 1924 she appeared in Til sæters, in 1925 in Fager er lien, and in 1926 in Simen Mustrøens besynderlige opplevelser, which was her last film.

Didi Holtermann was married to the actor Magnus Falkberget.

== Filmography ==
- 1922: Farende folk as Veronika
- 1924: Til sæters as Desideria, a servant girl
- 1925: Fager er lien as Hulda Stiansen
- 1926: Simen Mustrøens besynderlige opplevelser as Bertille, Simen's wife
