= Haakon Hjelde =

Norwegian actor (1902–1933)

- Born: February 12, 1902; Eidsvoll, Norway
- Died: December 10, 1933 (aged 31); Eidsvoll, Norway
- Occupation: Actor

Haakon Forsell Hjelde (February 12, 1902 – December 10, 1933) was a Norwegian actor. He also worked as a director's assistant and production manager's assistant. As a young man, he traveled to Berlin and then to Paris, where he lived and starred in several French films. He died of tuberculosis at age 31.

== Family ==
Hjelde was born in Eidsvoll, Norway, the son of the veterinarian Baard Arne Hjelde (1872–1935) and Alma Forsell Jensen (1871–1918). He married the Swedish dancer Maina Claes in 1929.

== Filmography ==
- 1926: Den nye lensmannen as Franz Joseph, a Gypsy
- 1926: Simen Mustrøens besynderlige opplevelser as Helge Hjort, the district judge
- 1927: Fjeldeventyret as Wilhelm, a student
- 1927: Syv dage for Elisabeth as Rolf Heller
- 1930: Eskimo as Majrak, a great hunter
- 1932: Halvvägs till himlen as Ned Lee
