= Gjest Baardsen =

Norwegian writer and criminal (1791 – 1849)

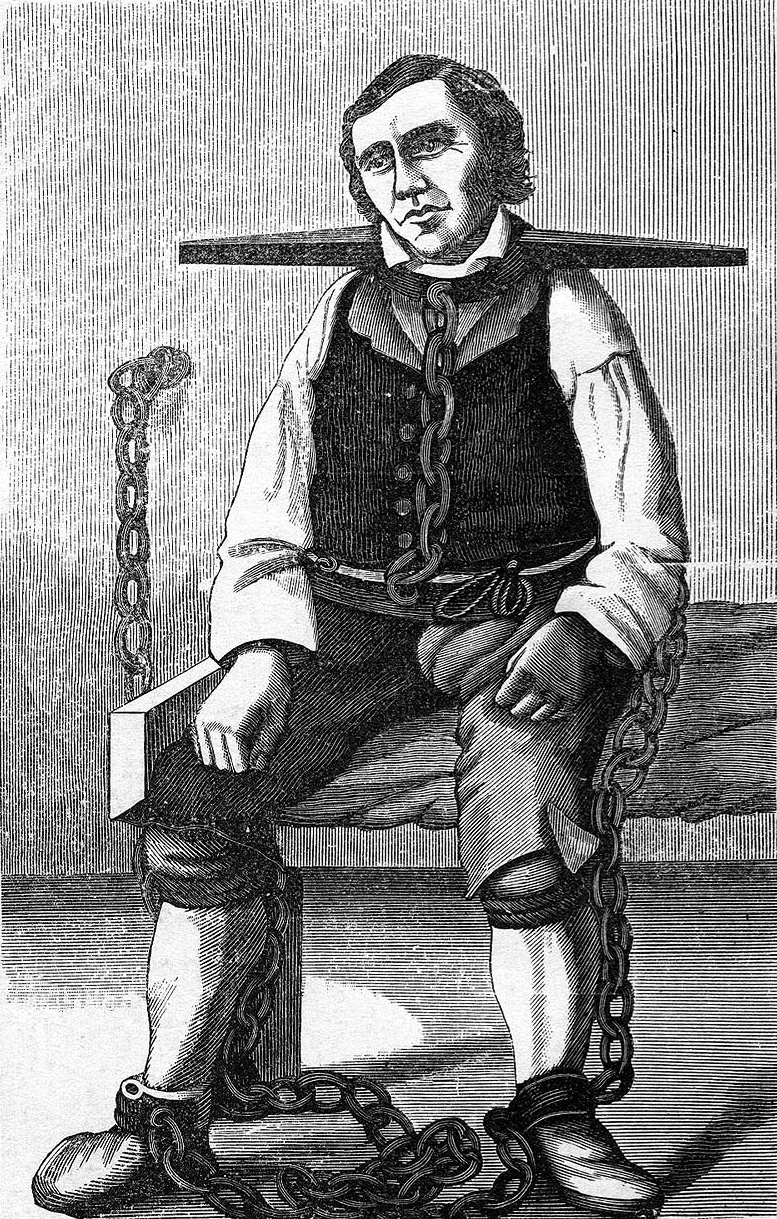
- Gjest Baardsen
- Born: c. 1791; Sogndalsfjøra, Sogn og Fjordane, Norway
- Died: 13 May 1849 (aged 58); Bergen, Hordaland, Norway
- Other name: Sogndalsfjæren
- Occupations: Sailor, vagabond, songwriter, bookseller

Gjest Baardsen (c. 1791 – 13 May 1849) was a Norwegian outlaw, jail-breaker, non-fiction writer, songwriter and memoirist. He was among the most notorious criminals in Norway in the 19th century.

== Personal life ==
Baardsen was born in Sogndalsfjøra, the son of fisherman Baard Gjestsen Fjæren and Maritha Pedersdatter. His father died in 1793. In 1848, Baardsen married Anne Elisabeth Reinche, who had had two children from a previous relationship.

== Criminal life and literary career ==
Baardsen was arrested several times for theft, and became legendary for his many successful escapes. From 1827 he served a life sentence at Akershus Prison, where he started a career as a writer. The first parts of his autobiography were published from 1835. He was held at Akershus for 18 years. After his release from prison in 1845 he earned his living as a songseller and bookseller, married and settled in Bergen. Among his songs is a song on fellow prisoner Ole Høiland's escape from Akershus (1839), and a song on Høiland's death, "Ole Høilands Død" from 1849. He wrote a collection of common words in the special sociolect called Fantespråk ("vagabond language"), which was utilized by Eilert Sundt in his studies, and published as Vandrings- eller skøiersprog in 1948.

== Legacy ==
The last part of Baardsen's autobiography, which covered his life after his release from prison, was published (posthumously) in 1869, and his full autobiography has been republished several times. A film based on Baardsen's life was made in 1939, directed by Tancred Ibsen. Alfred Maurstad played the title character. The film Gjest Baardsen was among the most viewed Norwegian films from the 1930s. The song "Fjellsangen", performed by Maurstad in the film, became very popular. His life has also been the basis for treatments in novels and plays, often based on his autobiography, in which he justified his crimes by claiming that he stole from the rich and wealthy and shared with the poor. Later research indicates that his own version is somewhat idealized. Baardsen's childhood home in Sogndalsfjøra has been preserved and prepared for use as a museum.
