= Jon Lennart Mjøen =

Norwegian actor

- Born: 22 October 1912; Christiania, Norway
- Died: 3 January 1997 (aged 84); Oslo, Norway
- Occupations: Actor; Film director Screenwriter
- Years active: 1936–1970

Jon Lennart Mjøen (22 October 1912 – 3 January 1997) was a Norwegian actor, film director and screenwriter. He appeared in twelve films between 1936 and 1968. His film Stevnemøte med glemte år was entered into the 7th Berlin International Film Festival.

Mjøen was primarily a stage actor and debuted at the Søilen Theater in 1933. He was employed at the New Theater from 1936 to 1937, then at the Trøndelag Theater until 1938, then the Centralteatret until 1959 (except some of the war years) and at the Oslo Nye Teater until 1967. He worked for some time after this freelance, although he made his last film, De ukjentes marked, in 1968.

== Filmography ==
- Vi vil oss et land... (1936)
- Den farlige leken (1942)
- Den nye lægen (1943)
- Et spøkelse forelsker seg (1946)
- To liv (1946)
- Sankt Hans fest (1947)
- John og Irene (1949)
- Kranes konditori (1951)
- Stevnemøte med glemte år (1957 – also directed)
- I slik en natt (1958)
- Pappa tar gull (1964)
- De ukjentes marked (1968)
