= To liv =

1946 Norwegian film directed by Titus Vibe-Müller

- Directed by: Titus Vibe-Müller
- Written by: Finn Bø
- Based on: Finn Bø's play To liv
- Starring: Erling Drangsholt; Sigrun Otto; Wenche Klouman; Frank Robert; Jon Lennart Mjøen; Carl Struve; Rolf Christensen; Kirsten Sørlie; Thorleif Enersen
- Cinematography: Kåre Bergstrøm
- Music by: Christian Hartmann
- Distributed by: Kamerafilm
- Release date: December 26, 1946
- Running time: 74 minutes
- Country: Norway
- Language: Norwegian

To liv (Two Lives) is a Norwegian war film from 1946 directed by Titus Vibe-Müller. The film is based on the play To liv by Finn Bø.

== Plot ==
Nordgård is no longer able to work as a lawyer during the German occupation of Norway, and he therefore tries to earn money by translating books. The family has rented out a room in their villa to a man named Klaus Thun, and the family's daughter Wenche soon becomes romantically interested in him. However, the family's son, Lars Nordgård, is arrested by the Gestapo when he tries to cross over to Sweden. The family soon discovers that Lars is dead, and his father learns that Klaus Thun is an informer for the Germans and may have been responsible for their son's arrest and murder. However, soon after, Wenche says that she plans to marry Thun, and that she is already pregnant with his child. Wenche does not believe her parents when they claim that Thun is an informer.

== Cast ==
- Erling Drangsholt as Ivar Nordgaard, a former lawyer
- Sigrun Otto as Else Nordgaard, his wife
- Wenche Klouman as Wenche, their daughter
- Frank Robert as Lars, their son
- Jon Lennart Mjøen as Klaus Thun
- Carl Struve as Gustafsen
- Rolf Christensen as Sahlmann
- Kirsten Sørlie as Marthe
- Thorleif Enersen as a member of the Statspolitiet
