= Syv dage for Elisabeth =

1927 film

- Directed by: Leif Sinding
- Written by: Leif Sinding
- Based on: 'Arvid Skappel's novella Påskeflirt
- Produced by: Leif Sinding
- Starring: Magda Holm; Haakon Hjelde; Ellen Sinding; Hilda Fredriksen
- Cinematography: Oscar Norberg
- Distributed by: Internationalt Films-Kompani A/S
- Release date: November 28, 1927
- Running time: 78 minutes
- Country: Norway
- Language: Norwegian

Syv dage for Elisabeth (Seven Days for Elizabeth) is a Norwegian silent film comedy from 1927 directed by Leif Sinding. The screenplay was written by Sinding and Arvid Skappel, and it was based on Skappel's novella Påskeflirt. Sonja Henie played a bit part in the film. The censors removed a closeup of a female dancer, the text Jeg vil, men først vi je ha dig sel 'I want to, but first I want you myself', and a brawl scene.

== Plot ==
Syv dage for Elisabeth (1927)

The young hairdresser Elisabeth Borg wins first prize in a lottery and decides to spend Easter at a resort in the mountains. She and her friend Lucie spend some luxurious days there. The scoundrel Franz Markel tries some mischief against Elisabeth, but he is revealed by the millionaire's son Rolf Heller, who gives the villain his just deserts. Rolf and Elisabeth are engaged, and on top of that Elisabeth finds her father, Consul Heie, whom she did not know before.

== Cast ==
- Magda Holm as Elisabeth Borg
- Haakon Hjelde as Rolf Heller
- Ellen Sinding as Lucie Breien
- Hilda Fredriksen a Henriette Kaspar
- Ragnvald Wingar as Joachim Jensen, a colporteur
- Emmy Worm-Müller as Josefine Hansen, the foster mother
- Ulf Selmer as Frantz Markel
- Per Kvist as Gunnar Erlind, a lecturer
- Rolf Knudssøn as Jan Drescher von Crongreen
- David Knudsen as Thomas Heie, a consul
- Henry Gleditsch as Morten Gribb, a journalist
- Harriet Paulsen as Kathleen Wilson
- Arne Svendsen as Vaaler, a director
- Bergljot Vedène as Madam Carena, a Russian ballerina
- Sverre Arnesen as a poker player
- Lizzie Florelius as Anna Palme
- Arthur Barking as the hotel concierge
- Kaare Knudsen as Knut, a mountain guide
- Sonja Henie as a young speed skater
