= Madame besøker Oslo =

1927 film

- Directed by: Harry Ivarson
- Written by: Harry Ivarson; Gurly Drangsholt; Alf Rød
- Produced by: George Willoughby
- Starring: Naima Wifstrand; Joachim Holst-Jensen; Erling Drangsholt; Lars Johannessen; Sonja Mjøen
- Cinematography: Gunnar Nilsen-Vig
- Edited by: Gunnar Nilsen-Vig
- Distributed by: Kommunenes Filmcentral
- Release date: 1927
- Running time: 118 minutes
- Country: Norway
- Language: Norwegian

Madame besøker Oslo (Madame Visits Oslo) is a Norwegian silent film from 1927.

The original screenplay was written by Alf Rød, but the film was produced based on a version of the screenplay reworked by Harry Ivarson and Gurly Drangsholt. Ivarson also directed the film, and Drangsholt was the production manager and assistant director.

== Plot ==
On the Berlin–Copenhagen express, Madame Vera Wadjevska and her friend Baron Felix de Video meet the rich banker Wagelsten from Sydney, who after many years of absence is on his way home to Norway to take over an estate. Wagelsten, however, suddenly falls dead, and the baron, who has an astonishing resemblance to Wagelsten, assumes his identity.

On the estate, young Helge lives in the certain belief that the beautiful property belongs to him, but he suddenly hears that the real owner, an uncle, is on his way. The impostor couple come and take over the estate. When they announce that the yacht Mayfair is for sale, it is bought by the rich wholesaler Heegaard from Oslo, who comes to the estate together with his daughter Edith. Helge gets a job as a sailor aboard the Mayfair without anyone knowing who he really is. He soon understands that something does not add up with his uncle, and he is supported by Edith, whom he has become friends with after he saves her life. Madame Vera, in turn, suspects Helge, whom she understands is no ordinary sailor, and tries to get him out of the way, but things do not go according to plan. Instead, Helge gets the opportunity to rescue Edith from the clutches of the baron, who has lured her out to the estate to compromise her. The police are now on the trail of the impostor couple, who flee at a furious speed and drive off a cliff. Helge now inherits the estate and marries Edith.

== Cast ==
- Naima Wifstrand as Madame Vera Wadjevska
- Joachim Holst-Jensen as Baron Felix de Video
- Erling Drangsholt as Helge Wagelsten
- Lars Johannessen as Heegaard, a factory owner
- Sonja Mjøen as Edith
- Per Kvist as boatsman on the Mayfair
- August Mowinckel-Nilsen as Freddie Juul
- Einar Vaage as Wagelsteen, a banker
- Eugen Skjønberg as Albert
- Hilda Fredriksen as Albert's wife
- Oscar Leffmann as the first butler
- Johannes Jensen as the second butler
- Erling Krogh as a troubadour
- Ellen Isefiær as a guest
