= Den nye lensmannen =

1926 film by Leif Sinding

- Directed by: Leif Sinding
- Starring: Haakon Hjelde
- Release date: 6 September 1926
- Running time: 94 minutes
- Country: Norway
- Language: Norwegian

Den nye lensmannen ('The New Sheriff') is a 1926 Norwegian drama film directed by Leif Sinding, starring Haakon Hjelde. The new sheriff (lensmann) hides a secret: he is actually a gypsy (tater). He tricks the locals out of their money, but he also helps two lovers unite.

== Cast ==
- Haakon Hjelde as Franz Joseph, a Gypsy
- Anna-Brita Ryding as Ragnhild Knutsdatter Øvrebø
- Ulf Selmer as Knut Øverbø, a wealthy farmer
- Einar Rose as Per Storflaten
- Martin Linge as Ola, a servant boy at the Øvrebø farm
- Ragnvald Wingar as Jens Brødlaus, a smallholder
- Marie Hedemark as Berthe Brødlaus, Jens's wife
- Mally Haaland as Signors Brødlaus, their daughter
- Ranveig Aasgaard as Marit, a servant girl
- Ellen Astrup as the hulder
- Helga Rydland as an elderly Gypsy woman
- Robert Sperati as the burial mound farmer
- Ellen Sinding as a dancer
- Maina Claes as a dancer
