= Med Maud over Polhavet =

1926 film

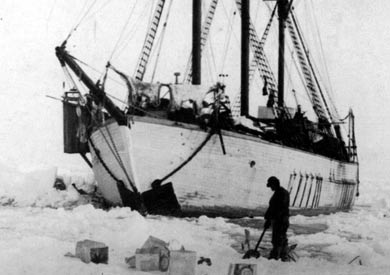
- Directed by: Odd Dahl
- Cinematography: Odd Dahl
- Release date: 1926
- Running time: 76
- Country: Norway
- Language: silent

Med Maud over Polhavet is a Norwegian documentary film from 1926, directed by Odd Dahl.

The film's maker, photographer and air force officer Odd Dahl, sailed aboard the ship Maud for two years from 1922 and filmed the crew on board as they travelled through the unexplored Arctic. Odd Dahl filmed the scientific work and many critical situations the crew faced on the ice.

By this time, the Maud expedition's former leader Roald Amundsen had left, and was engaged in his aerial expeditions to the North Pole.

The crew consisted of:

- Oscar Wisting, Captain
- Harald Ulrik Sverdrup, oceanographer
- Odd Dahl, airman, photographer
- Finn Malmgren, meteorologist
- Gennady Olonkin, telegraphist
- Søren Syvertsen, machinist (died 1923)
- Karl Hansen, handyman
- Kakot, handyman from Siberia

The film had its premiere at the Victoria Teater in Oslo on 17 May 1926, but was it previewed the day before with a lecture at the University of Oslo.
