= Den glade enke i Trangvik =

1927 film

- Directed by: Harry Ivarson
- Starring: Thorleif Klausen; Harald Steen; Sigrun Svenningsen; Erling Drangsholt; Lalla Carlsen; Egil Hjorth-Jenssen; Joachim Holst-Jensen; Sæbjørn Buttedahl; Alf Sommer
- Release date: 1927
- Running time: 105 minutes
- Country: Norway
- Language: Norwegian

Den glade enke i Trangvik (English: The Merry Widow of Trangvik) is a 1927 Norwegian silent drama film directed by Harry Ivarson. The movie is based on the content of Jacob Hilditch's satirical newspaper Trangviksposten.
