= Eli Sjursdotter =

- Directed by: Arne Bornebusch; Leif Sinding
- Written by: Henning Ohlson; Johan Falkberget (novel)
- Starring: Sonja Wigert; Ingjald Haaland; Sten Lindgren
- Release date: 31 October 1938
- Running time: 79 minutes
- Country: Norway
- Language: Norwegian

Eli Sjursdotter is a 1938 Norwegian drama film directed by Arne Bornebusch and Leif Sinding, starring Sonja Wigert, Ingjald Haaland and Sten Lindgren. The film is based on Johan Falkberget's 1913 novel of the same name.

In 1719, during the Great Northern War, a Swedish army is making its way home through Trøndelag during a particularly cold winter. The Swedish soldier Per Jönsa (Lindgren) seeks refuge in a mountain cottage, where he is cared for by the peasant daughter Eli Sjursdotter (Wigert). This is not well received by Eli's father (Haaland), who hates the Swedes.
