= Einar Tveito =

Norwegian actor

- Einar Tveito in Fante-Anne (1920)
- Born: April 14, 1890; Laardal Municipality, Norway
- Died: January 19, 1958 (aged 67); Oslo, Norway
- Occupation: Actor

Einar Tveito (April 14, 1890 – January 19, 1958) was a Norwegian actor.

Tveito was born in Laardal Municipality, Norway. He debuted as an actor in 1920 in Fante-Anne, and he appeared in 13 films until 1944.

== Filmography ==
=== Actor ===
- 1920: Fante-Anne as Jon Sandbakken, a smallholder
- 1926: Glomdalsbruden as Gjermund Haugsett
- 1927: Troll-elgen as Gunnar Sløvika, a horse dealer
- 1928: Viddenes folk as Lapp-Nils
- 1933: Jeppe på bjerget as Jesper, an estate manager
- 1934: Sangen om Rondane as a horse dealer
- 1936: Norge for folket as Berg, a merchant
- 1936: Vi vil oss et land... as Per Lium, a smallholder
- 1937: Fant as Josefa's uncle
- 1939: Gjest Baardsen as Mathias Strandvik
- 1940: Godvakker-Maren as the priest
- 1943: Unge viljer as Bjørn Storhaug, a farmer
- 1944: Villmarkens lov as Jo Waldor, a reindeer thief

=== Scriptwriter ===
- 1940: Godvakker-Maren

=== Production manager ===
- 1934: Sangen om Rondane
