= Viddenes folk =

- Directed by: Ragnar Westfelt
- Written by: Ragnar Westfelt
- Based on: A story by Bertil Lundquister
- Produced by: Ragnar Westfelt
- Starring: Mona Mårtenson; Einar Tveito; Tryggve Larssen
- Cinematography: George Schnéevoigt
- Edited by: Ragnar Westfelt
- Distributed by: Norsk Film AS
- Release date: December 26, 1928
- Running time: 102 minutes
- Country: Norway
- Language: Norwegian

Viddenes folk (The People of the Mountain Plateau) is a Norwegian romantic drama film from 1928 directed by Ragnar Westfelt. Westfelt also wrote the script and was the production manager. The script was based on a story by Bertil Lundquister.

The indoor scenes were recorded in the Spisesalen in Fossheim Sæter and the outdoor scenes in Fosheim Sæter, Nystuen, Filefjell, and Nordland. The film premiered at the Admiral-Palads cinema in Oslo on December 26, 1928.

== Plot ==
The film tells about a Sámi couple that fall in love with each other against the wishes of the woman's father. The woman in the couple, Nina, is made to believe that her chosen one, Lapp-Nils, is a murderer, and she reluctantly agrees to marry the man her father has chosen, Mats. When the wedding day comes, Mats drinks himself senseless and sets fire to the tent they live in. While this is going on, Lapp-Nils manages to say to Nina that he wants to meet her later at Storevaren. Mats thinks that Lapp-Nils is dead, and he is so frightened when he sees him that he confesses to having committed the reindeer thefts that Lapp-Nils was accused of, and then he staggers out into the night to a cliff, where he falls and dies. Lapp-Nils and Nina meet, and together with a herd of 100 reindeer they go to other regions.

In the censorship of the film, a number of bloody scenes were cut.

== Cast ==
- Mona Mårtenson as Nina
- Einar Tveito as Lapp-Nils
- Tryggve Larssen as Borka, Nina's father
- Tore Lindwall as Mats
- Sigurd Eldegard as the judge
- Snefrid Aukland as a sorceress
