= Fjeldeventyret =

1927 film

- Directed by: Leif Sinding
- Written by: Leif Sinding
- Based on: Henrik Anker Bjerregaard's play Fjeldeventyret
- Starring: Ulf Selmer; Henny Geermann; Anna-Brita Ryding; Josef Sjøgren; Haakon Hjelde; Per Kvist; Henry Gleditsch; Ellen Sinding
- Cinematography: Oscar Norberg
- Edited by: Leif Sinding
- Music by: Waldemar Thrane; Tønnes Birknes
- Distributed by: Svalefilm
- Release date: January 31, 1927
- Running time: 108 minutes
- Country: Norway
- Language: Norwegian

Fjeldeventyret (The Mountain Story) is a Norwegian film from 1927 based on Henrik Anker Bjerregaard's play of the same name from 1824. The film is a romantic drama. It was directed by Leif Sinding.

== Plot ==
Mons Østmoe wants to move up in the world by marrying Marie, the daughter of his uncle the bailiff, and becoming the village's new bailiff. He mistakenly arrests three students in the belief that they are wanted robbers. The three students surrender in the hope that the trial will become a farce. It turns out that one of those arrested, Albek, is Marie's secret fiancé and the judge's nephew. To avoid scandal, the bailiff allows Albek to marry his daughter. Mons must therefore settle for the bailiff's niece Ragnhild.

== Cast ==
- Ulf Selmer as Østmoe, the bailiff
- Henny Geermann as Marie Østmoe, the bailiff's daughter
- Anna-Brita Ryding as Ragnhild, the bailiff's niece
- Josef Sjøgren as Mons Østmoe, the deputy bailiff
- Haakon Hjelde as Wilhelm, a student
- Per Kvist as Ole Finberg, a student
- Henry Gleditsch as Hansen, a student
- Ellen Sinding as Aagot, a mountain girl
- David Knudsen as the district judge
- Sæbjørn Buttedahl as Jon
- Arthur Barking as Ole Sørbraaten
- Jakob Amundsen as Mads
