= Den nye lægen =

- Directed by: Rasmus Breistein
- Written by: B.V. Holbæk-Hansen (play); Rasmus Breistein
- Starring: Jon Lennart Mjøen
- Release date: 26 December 1943
- Running time: 91 minutes
- Country: Norway
- Language: Norwegian

Den nye lægen (English: The New Doctor) is a 1943 Norwegian drama film directed by Rasmus Breistein, starring Jon Lennart Mjøen. The film is based on a play by Bjarne Viggo Holbæk-Hansen.

== Cast ==
- Eva Lunde as Rigmor, hans datter
- Erna Schøyen as Klara, hans kone
- Jon Lennart Mjøen as Kåre Bugge, doktor
- Carl Struve as Øyvind, Ulrichs yngre bror
- Folkman Schaanning as Pastor Reimers
- Tryggve Larssen as Pallsen, doktor
- Ellen Isefiær as Fru Hoffmann
- Thorleif Reiss as Mørch, ingeniør
- Einar Vaage as Ordføreren
- Jorunn Groth as Victoria, Mørchs datter
- Erling Hanson as Hoffmann, direktør
- Kirsten Bødtker as Sonja Hoffmann
- Sofie Bernhoft as Madam Anders, en klok kone
- Oscar Amundsen as Fylkesmannen
- Haakon Arnold as Antonsen
- Ester Tellander as Anna Antonsen
- Oscar Egede-Nissen as Jentoft
- Thorleif Mikkelsen as Knatten
- Arthur Barking as the master builder
