= Johan Bojer =

Norwegian author

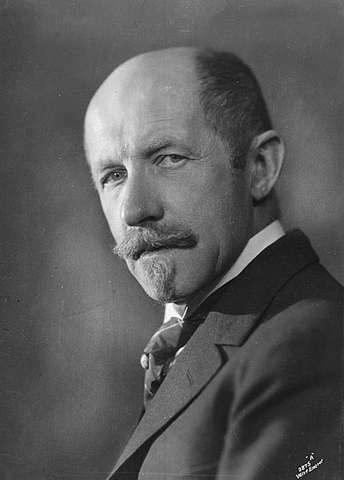
- Johan Bojer in 1927
- Born: 6 March 1872; Ørkedalsøren, Norway
- Died: 3 July 1959 (aged 87)
- Writing career
- Notable works: The Emigrants; Den siste viking

Johan Bojer (6 March 1872 – 3 July 1959) was a popular Norwegian novelist and dramatist. He principally wrote about the lives of the poor farmers and fishermen, both in his native Norway and among the Norwegian immigrants in the United States. He was nominated for the Nobel Prize in Literature five times.

== Biography ==
Bojer was born Johan Kristoffer Hansen in the village of Ørkedalsøren, now part of the town of Orkanger in Trøndelag county. The son of unmarried parents—Hans Christophersen Bojer and Johanna Iversdatter Elgaaen—he grew up as a foster child in a poor family living in Rissa Municipality near Trondheim, Norway. Bojer learned early the realities of poverty. His early years were spent working on a farm and working as a bookkeeper. After the death of his father in 1894, he took the surname Bojer.

His literary work began with the publication of Unge tanker in 1893, and continued to gather strength through the 1920s. Because of the range of topics he addressed, he won critical acclaim in Norway. He gained international fame after many of his works were published in foreign languages. Critics generally recognize his best work to be his novel, Den siste viking, (English title: The Last of the Vikings). This novel powerfully and realistically depicts the lives of fishermen from Trøndelag, who spend the winter fishing in the Lofoten island archipelago within the Arctic Circle near the far north coast of Norway.

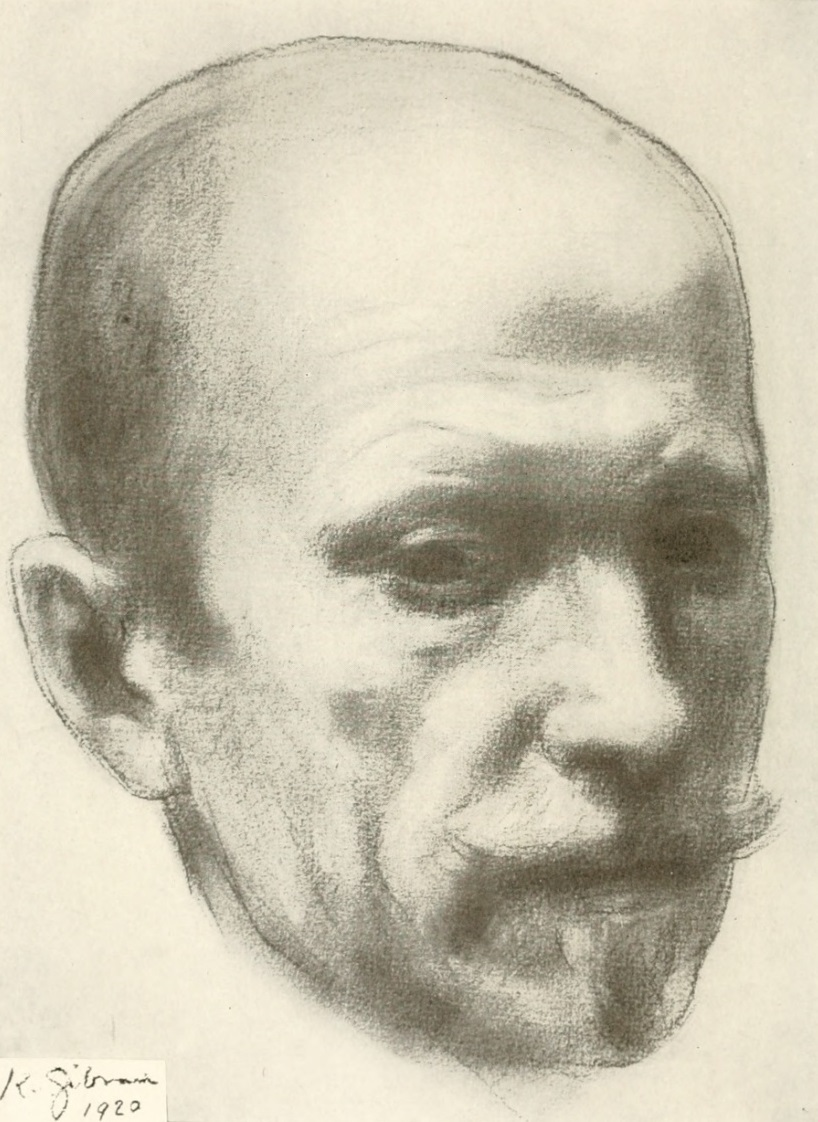
Portrait of Johan Bojer, 1920, by Kahlil Gibran

Bojer is best remembered for The Emigrants, a major novel dealing with the motivations and trials of Norwegians emigrated on the plains of North Dakota. In 1923, Bojer journeyed to Litchville, North Dakota, to research the lives of the Norwegian immigrants who had settled there. The result of his visit became a novel originally published in Norway as Vor egen stamme.

== Selected works ==
- Unge tanker - novel published under the name Johan K. Hansson
- Et folketog – A Procession (1896)
- Troens magt - The Power of a Lie (1903/English 1909)
- Fangen som sang (1913)
- Den store hunger – The Great Hunger (1916/English 1918)
- Verdens ansigt - The Face of the World (1917)
- Den siste viking - The Last of the Vikings (1921/English 1923)
- Vor egen stamme -The Emigrants (1924/English 1925)
- Folk ved sjøen - The Everlasting Struggle (1929/English 1931)

== Additional Sources ==
- Gad, Carl Johan Bojer: The Man and His Works (Moffat, Yard and Company, 1920. translated by Elizabeth Jelliffe MacIntire)
- Lödrup, Hans P. Johan Bojer (The American-Scandinavian Review, Vol. XIV, No. 4, April, 1926)
- Jorgenson, Theodore History of Norwegian Literature (The Macmillan Company, 1933)
- Downs, Brian W. Modern Norwegian Literature, 1860-1918 (Cambridge University Press, 1966)
