= Bør Børson Jr. (1938 film) =

- Directed by: Toralf Sandø
- Written by: Johan Falkberget
- Starring: Toralf Sandø
- Release date: 26 December 1938
- Running time: 102 minutes (original release)
- Country: Norway
- Language: Norwegian

Bør Børson Jr. is a 1938 Norwegian comedy film directed by, and starring Toralf Sandø. Conrad Arnesen played a small role in the film. The film is based on a novel by Johan Falkberget.

Bør Børson Jr. (Sandø) is a peasant son with great ambitions. He starts a grocery store and – after some initial problems – makes a good deal of money. He then leaves for Oslo, where he makes a fortune in the stock trade. Eventually, he returns to his hometown, where he holds a lavish wedding with his childhood sweetheart.
