= Til sæters =

1924 film

- Directed by: Harry Ivarson
- Written by: Harry Ivarson
- Based on: Claus Pavels Riis's musical Til Sæters: dramatisk Idyl med Sange
- Produced by: A. Rich-Petersen
- Starring: Ellen Sinding; Hjalmar Fries; Olafr Havrevold; Didi Holtermann; Sigrun Svenningsen; Signe Heide Steen; Sverre Næss
- Cinematography: Thorleif Tønsberg
- Edited by: Harry Ivarson
- Distributed by: Cinema A/S
- Release date: 1924
- Running time: 85 minutes
- Country: Norway
- Language: Norwegian

Til sæters (To the Mountain Pastures) is a Norwegian silent comedy film from 1924 directed by Harry Ivarson (his first Norwegian film). He also wrote the screenplay based on Claus Pavels Riis's 1850 musical Til Sæters: dramatisk Idyl med Sange (To the Mountain Pastures: A Dramatic Idyll with Singing). The plot of the musical was very thin and mostly served as an excuse to link together various dance performances accompanied by well-known Norwegian folk melodies. Ivarson therefore added more people to the story and a little more intrigue, but retained the basic mood of the musical.

Til sæters is an example of the folk romantic film genre that was popular in Norway in the 1920s.

== Filming ==
The filming took place in Øystre Slidre Municipality and at the Norwegian Museum of Cultural History at Bygdøy.

== Plot ==
A widow on a large farm has two daughters she hopes to marry off. Ragnhild, one of the daughters, is intended to be married to the village schoolmaster, but she is in love with Asmund, a poor farm boy. Asmund gives Ragnhild a silver cross, which the schoolmaster steals, and in despair Ragnhild tries to avoid Asmund, who believes that Ragnhild is flirting with Halvor, a rich man's son. After many complications, the silver cross is returned to its rightful owner, the schoolmaster receives his punishment, and Ragnhild and Asmund are united. In addition, it turns out that Halvor likes the other daughter, Sigrid, and there is a double wedding.

== Cast ==
- Ellen Sinding as Ragnhild
- Hjalmar Fries as Asmund Nordheia
- Olafr Havrevold as Halvor, son of a rich farmer
- Didi Holtermann as Desideria, a servant girl
- Sigrun Svenningsen as Sigrid
- Signe Heide Steen as Gunhild
- Sverre Næss as the schoolmaster
- Rudolf Mjølstad as Per
- Emmy Worm-Müller as Kari
- Arne Svendsen as the priest
- Idar Tranar as Nordal, a theology student
- Henry Randolf as Stenby, a theology student
- Josef Sjøgren as Busk, a perpetual student
