= Jeppe on the Hill =

1722 comic play by Ludvig Holberg

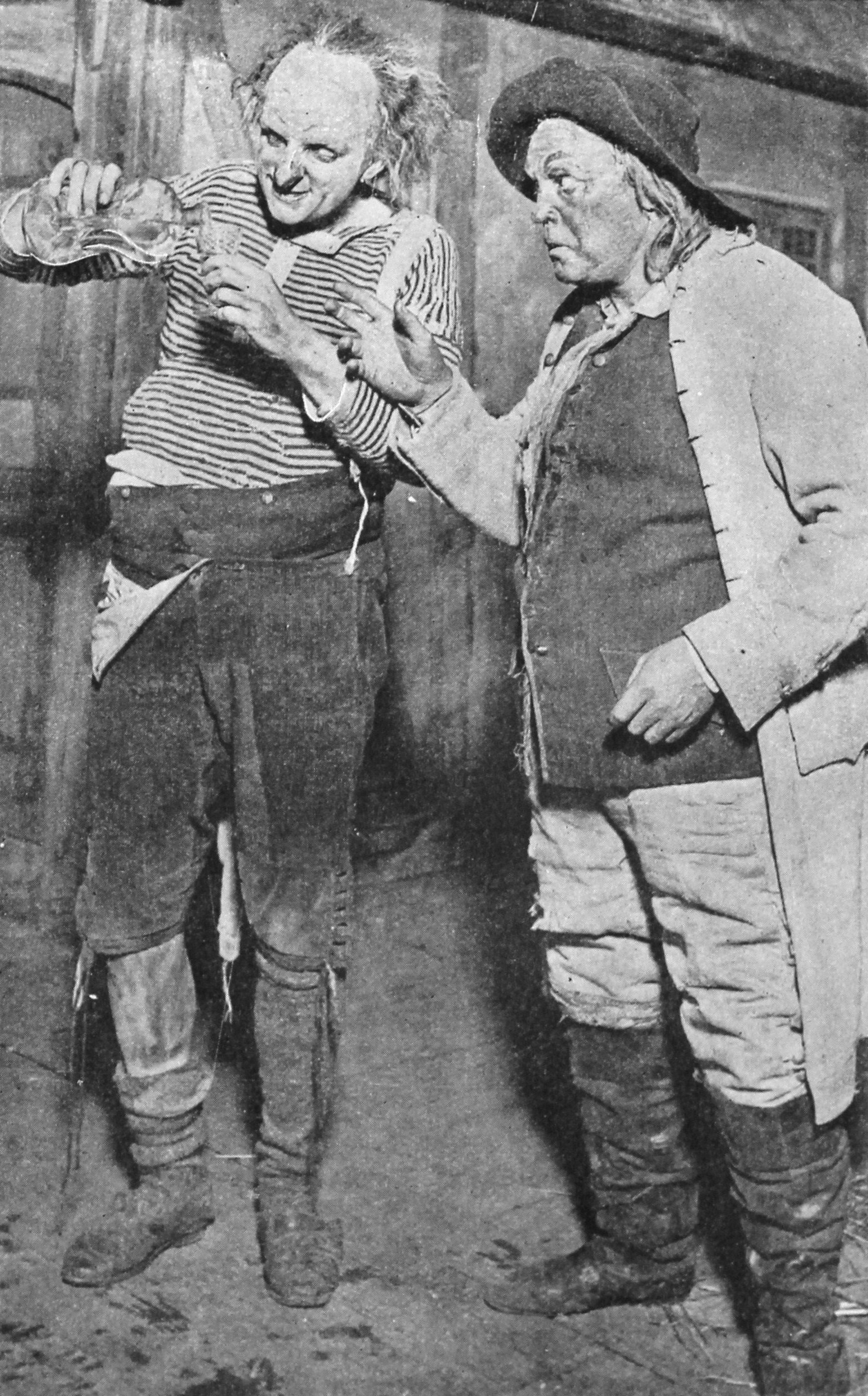
- Henrik Malberg (right) as Jeppe and Valdemar Møller as Jacob Shoemaker in a 1918 production at the Royal Danish Theatre.
- Author: Ludvig Holberg
- Original title: Jeppe på Bjerget
- Language: Danish
- Genre: Comedy
- Set in: 17th century Denmark
- Published: 1722
- Publication place: Denmark-Norway

Jeppe on the Hill; Or, The Transformed Peasant (Danish and Norwegian: Jeppe på bjerget) is a Danish comedy by the Norwegian playwright Ludvig Holberg, written during the time of the Dano-Norwegian dual monarchy. The play premiered at the Lille Grønnegade Theatre in 1722, and was first published in print in 1723. The play has a special status in Danish theater, and playing the lead role, Jeppe, is seen as a great distinction. Because of this, it was entered into the Danish Culture Canon in 2006. Despite its fame in Denmark, it is not well known in the English-speaking world.

In the play, Jeppe is a drunkard peasant who is abused by his wife, Nille. The Baron and his court find him in a drunken stupor and decide to play a joke on Jeppe. A well-known quotation from the work is from Jeppe's soliloquy early in the play, where he says, "Everybody says that Jeppe drinks, but nobody asks why Jeppe drinks", rationalizing his alcohol abuse as a sensible reaction to his miserable life.

== Synopsis ==
The story follows Jeppe, a peasant who is ill treated by his wife and exploited by his employers. The opening scene of the play sees his wife, Nille, demand he make a long trip to buy soap. On his way, he stops at the inn of Jakob Skomager, who slowly coerces Jeppe into spending all of his money on alcohol. While in a drunken stupor, he is discovered by the baron and his servants who decide to play a joke on Jeppe. They take him to the baron's castle where he is dressed in the nobleman's clothes and put in his bed. The pranksters then wait nearby to watch the fallout.

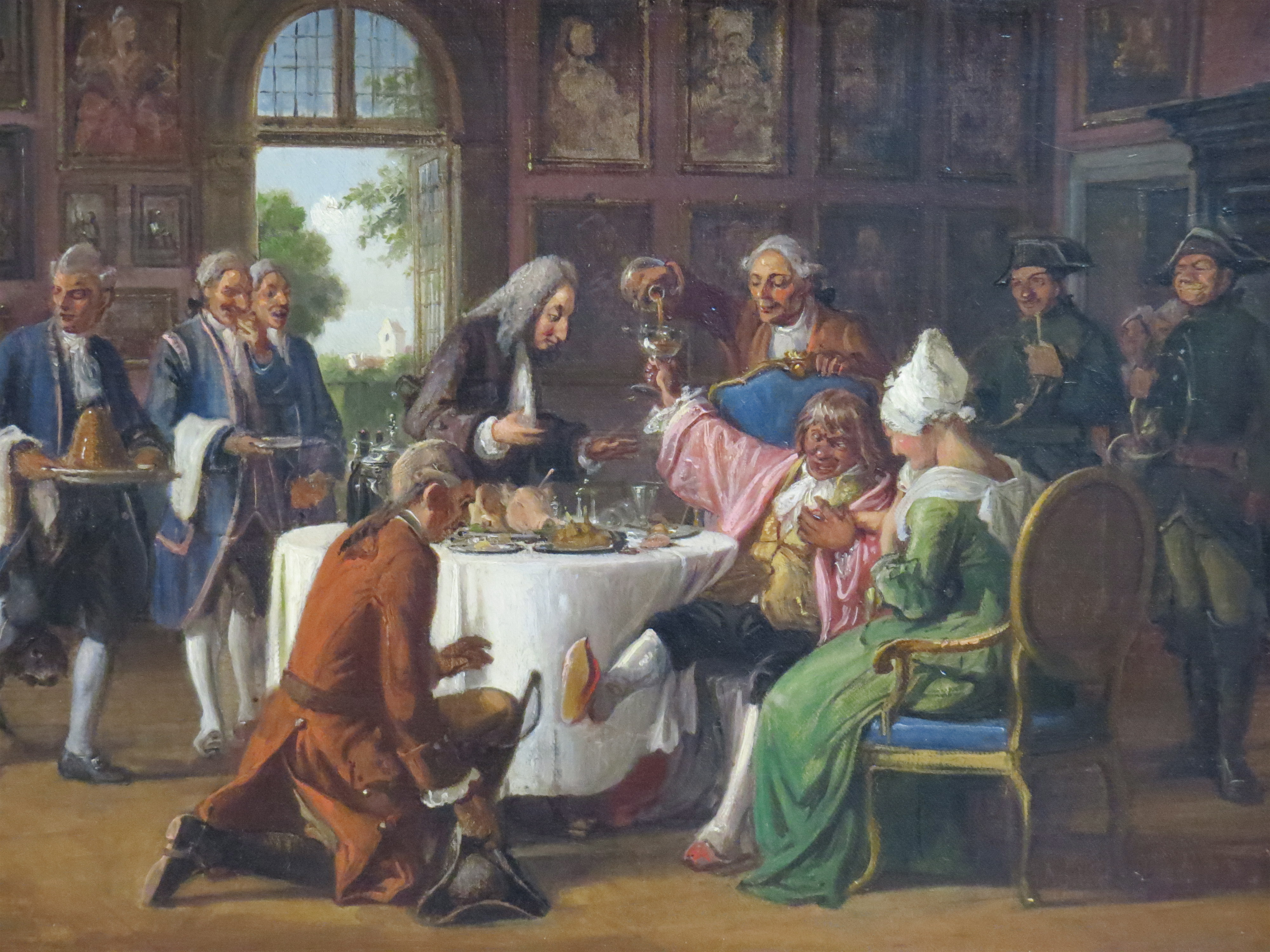
Scene from Jeppe paa bjerget, illustrated by Wilhelm Marstrand.

Upon awaking, Jeppe is greatly confused by the grandeur of his surroundings and wonders if he is dreaming or in paradise. He calls out for his wife to no avail. Unable to remember how he got to the castle from being a peasant, he begins to wonder if he is someone else entirely. Servants in uniforms and doctors arrive and convince Jeppe that he is in fact the Baron. He then decides to entertain himself by ordering about the servants, and eating and drinking to excess. He once again falls into a drunken stupor. He is dressed in his old clothes and returned to the side of the road where the baron had found him.

When Jeppe wakes again, he is certain that he had been in paradise. In an attempt to go back, he takes a nap, but is interrupted by his wife smacking him on the back of the head. He then remarks that he is certainly no longer in paradise.

Jeppe is then arrested and presented before the magistrate for seizing the baron's castle and tormenting the servants. The mock trial finds him guilty and sentences him to be hung and poisoned. He begs for his life to no avail, but settles for some whiskey instead. Before his execution, he drinks and says goodbye to his family and friends before once again falling into a drunken stupor. He is then hung at the gallows by his arm pits. Nille, convinced he is dead, expresses regret for her treatment of her husband. Jeppe then wakes up, as the poison he has been administered was in fact a sleeping potion. He immediately asks for schnapps and is chastised by wife, who is no longer sympathetic.

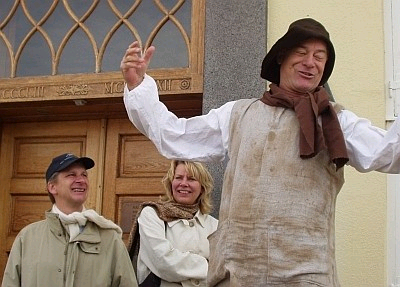
Niels Andersen playing Jeppe in front of actors Henrik Koefoed and Kirsten Olesen in 2004.

The court which had sentenced him to hang in jest then pardons him, and he is taken down from the gallows. He is given a significant sum of money by the magistrate. The true nature of the events are finally revealed to Jeppe by Magnus. Jeppe is much humiliated and becomes the laughingstock of the village. The play closes on the baron reflecting that the events show why peasants should not be given power.

== Film adaptations ==
- Jeppe paa bjerget (1909), starring Gustav Lund
- Skomakarprinsen (1920), directed by Hjalmar Davidsen
- Jeppe på bjerget (1933)
- Loffe som miljonär (1948), directed by Gösta Bernhard
- Jeppe på bjerget (1963), directed by Kai Wilton
- Jeppe på bjerget (1981), directed by Kaspar Rostrup
- Jeppe på bjerget (1995), directed by Bernt Callenbo

== English translations ==
- Holberg, Ludvig (1906). Jeppe on the Hill; or, The Transformed Peasant; a comedy in five acts. Translated by Westergaard, Waldemar; Ruud, Martin B(ronn). Grand Forks, ND: The Evening Times Company.
- —— (1914). Comedies by Holberg: Jeppe of the hill, The Political Tinker, Erasmus Montanus. Translated by Campbell, Oscar James; Schenck, Frederick. New York: The American-Scandinavian Foundation. OCLC 477029781.
- —— (1957). Three Comedies: The Transformed Peasant, The Arabian Powder, The Healing Spring. Translated by Spink, Reginald. London: William Heinemann. OCLC 1153458237.
- —— (1933). "Jeppe of the Hill". In Clark, Barrett (ed.). World Drama: Italy, Spain, France, Germany, Denmark, Russia, and Norway. Translated by Jagendorf, M. Dover. pp. 588–607. OCLC 26335417.
- —— (1990). Jeppe of the Hill and Other Comedies. Translated by Argetsinger, Gerald S.; Rossel, Sven Hakon. Carbondale: Southern Illinois University Press. ISBN 978-0-8093-1480-5. OCLC 1156867790.
- Heiberg, Johan Ludvig; Holberg, Ludvig (1999). Three Danish Comedies. Translated by Meyer, Michael Leverson. London: Oberon Books. ISBN 9781840020601. OCLC 1098665264.
- Holberg, Ludvig (2020). Ludvig Holberg Plays. Volume I: Just Justesen's reflections on theatre, Jeppe of the hill, Ulysses von Ithacia. Translated by Holm, Bent; Kynoch, Gaye. Hollitzer. ISBN 9783990125953. OCLC 1155694802.
