= Titus Vibe-Müller =

Norwegian film director

- Born: 17 October 1912; Kristiania, Norway
- Died: 19 May 1986 (aged 73)
- Occupation: Film director
- Notable work: Operation Swallow: The Battle for Heavy Water (1948)
- Awards: ENIC Medal, 1948 Venice Film Festival

Titus Vibe-Müller (17 October 1912 – 19 May 1986) was a Norwegian film director.

== Biography ==
Vibe-Müller was born in Kristiania on 17 October 1912, a son of merchant Heini Müller and actress Ingse Vibe.

Among his films are To liv from 1946 (jointly with Finn Bø), Kampen om tungtvannet from 1948, which he co-directed with Jean Dréville, a French/Norwegian co-production documenting the Norwegian heavy water sabotage during the Second World War, Marianne på sykehus from 1950, and Flukten fra Dakar from 1951. He made a number of television documentaries with zoologist Per Høst.

He was awarded the ENIC Medal at the 1948 Venice Film Festival.
