= Reidar Lund =

Norwegian cinematographer (1897–1978)

Reidar Lund (3 June 1897 – 19 March 1978) was a Norwegian cinematographer.

Filming his first sports event at Frogner stadion in 1920, Lund participated as a cameraman on expeditions to Novaya Zemlya in 1921 and Alaska in 1924. He was a cinematographer for his first motion picture in 1925, Himmeluret, and was especially active between 1938 and 1946, with films such as Hu Dagmar (1939), Godvakker-Maren (1940), Jeg drepte! (1942), and Kommer du, Elsa? (1944). His last motion picture was Flukt fra paradiset (1955). Then, until his retirement in 1968 he worked in the Norwegian Broadcasting Corporation. He received the King's Medal of Merit in gold. He resided in Bærum.

== Selected filmography ==
- Song of Rondane (1934)
