= Den hemmelighetsfulle leiligheten =

- Directed by: Tancred Ibsen
- Written by: Kristian Elster (short story); Tancred Ibsen
- Starring: Ola Isene; Sonja Wigert
- Release date: 1 November 1948
- Running time: 75 minutes
- Country: Norway
- Language: Norwegian

Den hemmelighetsfulle leiligheten (English: The Mysterious Apartment) is a 1948 Norwegian drama film directed by Tancred Ibsen, starring Ola Isene and Sonja Wigert. The film is based on a short story by Kristian Elster. A bachelor in his forties buys an apartment owned by an artist who died a sudden death. The peculiar atmosphere of the place, and the sudden appearance of the artist's girlfriend, shakes the conservative man out of his habits.
