= Jolly Kramer-Johansen =

Norwegian composer

- Born: 7 May 1902; Kristiania
- Died: 17 September 1968 (aged 66); Bærum
- Occupation: Composer

Jolly Kramer-Johansen (7 May 1902 – 17 September 1968) was a Norwegian composer. He composed music for several films, including De vergeløse from 1939, Bastard from 1940, Tørres Snørtevold from 1940, Den farlige leken from 1942, and Bustenskjold from 1958. Among his song compositions are Frihetens forpost, with lyrics by Arne Paasche Aasen.
