= Harry Ivarson =

Norwegian film director and screenwriter

- Born: September 7, 1892; Chicago
- Died: 1967 (aged 74–75)
- Occupations: Film director, screenwriter
- Years active: 1923–1943

Harry Ivarson (September 7, 1892 – 1967) was a Norwegian film director and screenwriter.

Ivarson was born in Chicago, the son of the actor William Ivarson and actress Anna Ivarson. In addition to Harry, the couple had a son Wictor (born in 1893) and a daughter Borghild (born in 1895). In 1910 the family lived in Årstad.

Ivarson studied film in the United States and Germany. He debuted as a director and screenwriter in Germany in 1923 with the film Wenn Männer richten under the pseudonym Harry Williams. He continued his career in Norway with the films Til sæters (1924), Fager er lien (1925), Simen Mustrøens besynderlige opplevelser (1926), Madame besøker Oslo (1927), and Den glade enke i Trangvik (1927), which was his last silent film. In the 1930s, Ivarson switched to sound films, and together with Per Aabel he directed Jeppe på bjerget in 1933. He directed his last film in 1943, the documentary Bergen. Ivarson was the head of the NRK office in Bergen during the Second World War.

== Filmography ==
=== Director ===
- 1923: Wenn Männer richten
- 1924: Til sæters
- 1925: Fager er lien
- 1926: Simen Mustrøens besynderlige opplevelser
- 1927: Madame besøker Oslo
- 1927: Den glade enke i Trangvik
- 1933: Jeppe på bjerget
- 1943: Bergen

=== Screenwriter ===
- 1923: Wenn Männer richten
- 1924: Til sæters
- 1925: Fager er lien
- 1926: Simen Mustrøens besynderlige opplevelser
- 1927: Madame besøker Oslo
- 1927: Den glade enke i Trangvik
- 1933: Jeppe på bjerget
- 1943: Bergen
