= De vergeløse =

- Directed by: Leif Sinding
- Written by: Leif Sinding
- Based on: The Orphans by Gabriel Scott
- Starring: Georg Richter; Eva Lunde
- Cinematography: Per G. Jonson
- Music by: J. Kramer Johansen
- Release date: 28 September 1939
- Running time: 73 minutes
- Country: Norway
- Language: Norwegian

De vergeløse (lit. 'The Defenceless') is a 1939 Norwegian drama film directed by Leif Sinding, based on a book by Gabriel Scott, that stars Georg Richter and Karin Meyer.

== Plot ==
Albert (Georg Richter) is placed in an orphanage, where he is treated like a slave. He tries to escape, but is caught. Then a young girl, Gunda (Eva Lunde), appears.

== Cast ==
- Georg Richter as Albert
- Karin Meyer as Albert's mom
- Eva Lunde as Gunda
- Tryggve Larssen as Flugum, gårdbruker
- Kjell Willy Johansen as Anton
- Irene Thomsen Lie as Dina
- Per Kvist as Mathias
- Asbjørn Toms as Lorang
- Henry Nyrén as Petter
- Harry Braude as Doffen
- Aage Johansen as Kalle
- P. Steenfeldt Foss as Emil
- Ole Johansen as Jakob
- Frank Martinsen as Nils
- Hans Bille as Inspektøren
- Joachim Holst-Jensen as Wollert
- Harald Steen as Sjømannen
