= Tancred Ibsen =

Norwegian military officer, aviator, film director and screenwriter

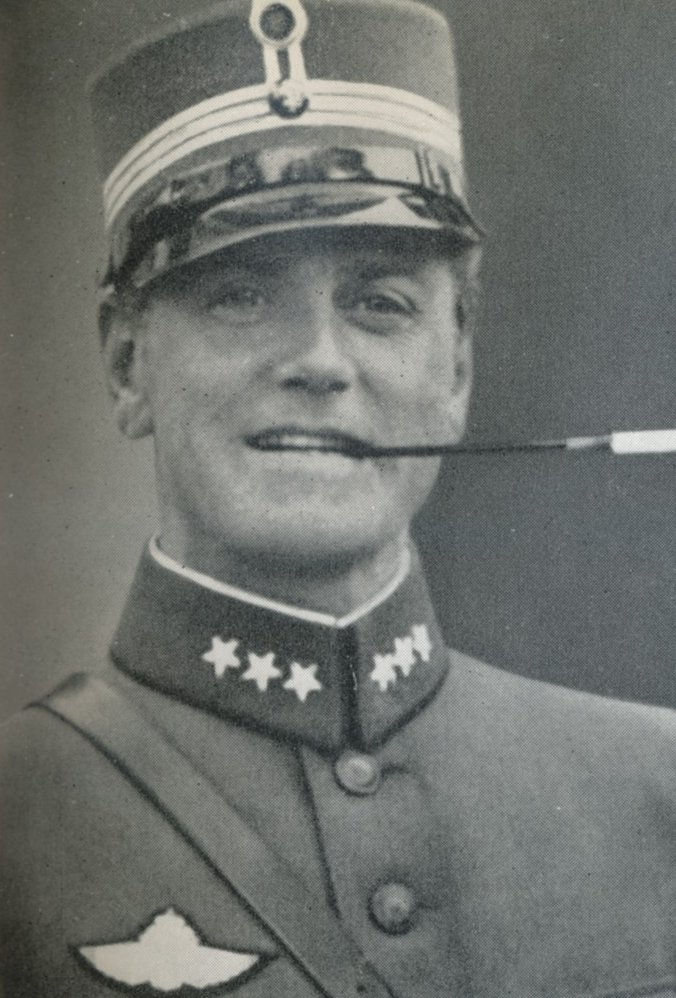
- Tancred Ibsen
- Born: 11 July 1893; Gausdal, Norway
- Died: 4 December 1978 (aged 85); Oslo, Norway
- Occupations: Film director, screenwriter, officer, and pilot
- Spouse: Lillebil Ibsen
- Children: Tancred Ibsen Jr.
- Parent(s): Sigurd Ibsen and Bergljot Bjørnson

Tancred Ibsen (11 July 1893 – 4 December 1978) was a Norwegian military officer, aviator, film director and screenwriter.

== Background ==
Ibsen was the son of Sigurd Ibsen and Bergljot Bjørnson. He was the grandson of both Henrik Ibsen and Nobel laureate Bjørnstjerne Bjørnson. He married dancer and actress Lillebil Ibsen in 1919, and remained married to her until his death in 1978. His son Tancred Ibsen Jr. (1921–2015) was a Norwegian diplomat.

== Aviation career ==
In 1917, Tancred Ibsen started pilot training at Kjeller Airport and began his career in the Norwegian Army Air Service. He started the first civilian active airplane company, A/S Aero in 1920, financed by his uncle, businessman Einar Bjørnson, and two shipowners. The company successfully operated demonstration, advertising, and limited mail flights with Ibsen as the head pilot. The company also chartered airplanes to the Det Norske Luftfartrederi routes in southern Norway. The activity of A/S Aero ended, with the company becoming part of the aircraft factory A/S Norske Aeroplanfabrik in Tønsberg.

== Film career ==
A 1923 trip to New York and a screening of D.W. Griffith's Orphans of the Storm inspired Ibsen with the potential of filmmaking. He spent the next two years in Los Angeles, working at Metro Goldwyn Mayer as a handyman, electrician, and finally in the script department.

Ibsen's return to Norway and directoral debut in 1931 was Norway's first feature-length sound film, Den store barnedåpen. Through the 1930s he would "dominate" the nation's film industry, together with Leif Sinding (1895–1985). Ibsen produced conventional melodramas more or less on the model of THE Classical Hollywood cinema. In 1940, he returned to active military service against Operation Weserübung but continued to produce films through 1942.

After the war, Ibsen took on the project To mistenkelige personer (1950), based on a 1933 book by Gunnar Larsen about a real-life 1926 killing. The completed film was banned by the Supreme Court of Norway, based on the privacy rights of one of the figures in the real-life killing, still alive.

== Second World War ==
Ibsen was arrested on 17 August 1943 during the Occupation of Norway by Nazi Germany. He was imprisoned in Schildberg and then Luckenwalde until the camp was liberated.

== Selected filmography ==
- 1931: Den store barnedåpen (director)
  - The first Norwegian talkie
- 1933: Men with Brooms (writer, director)
- 1934: Op med hodet (writer, director), his wife Lillibel Ibsen starred in this play
- 1934: Synnøve Solbakken (director), based on the novel written by Bjørnstjerne Bjørnson
- 1935: Kanske en gentleman (director)
- 1935: Du har lovet meg en kone (writer, director, editor)
- 1936: Ä vi gifta? (director)
- 1936: Poor Millionaires (director)
- 1936: The Ghost of Bragehus (director)
- 1937: Fant (director)
- 1937: To levende og en død (writer, director, editor)
- 1939: Whalers (director)
- 1939: Gjest Baardsen (writer, director)
- 1940: Tørres Snørtevold (director)
- 1942: The Dangerous Game (director)
- 1948: The Private Apartment (writer, director)
- 1950: To mistenkelige personer (writer, director)
  - Forbidden to be shown in public by the Supreme Court of Norway in 1952, legalized and published in 2007
- 1951: Storfolk og småfolk (writer, director)
- 1952: Oslo 1952: The VI Olympic Winter Games (director)
  - Official video of the 1952 Winter Olympics, held in Oslo, Norway
- 1960: Venner (director)
- 1963: The Wild Duck (director), written by Henrik Ibsen
