= Tante Pose =

- Directed by: Leif Sinding
- Based on: the book by Norwegian author Gabriel Scott
- Starring: Henny Skjønberg
- Cinematography: Ulf Greber; Per G. Jonson
- Release date: 1940
- Country: Norway
- Language: Norwegian

Tante Pose is a 1940 Norwegian film, directed by Leif Sinding. It is based on the book by Norwegian author Gabriel Scott.

It stars Henny Skjønberg in the title role.

== Synopsis ==
The Christmas preparations are underway at the wealthy Bals family farm. Everyone is busy getting ready for days of season celebrations when a message arrives that puts an immediate damper on the festivities; Magistrate Bals' cranky old sister - nicknamed "tante Pose" (direct translation: auntie bag) - has announced her arrival at the farm. The aunt and old grandpa Bals can't stand each other and from the moment she shows her face there is a state of war between the two, seriously complicating the family celebrations.

The movie was a huge hit in Norwegian movie-theaters in 1940 and has since grown to become a staple of Norwegian Christmas traditions, being shown on television every Christmas.
