= The Dangerous Game (1942 film) =

- Directed by: Tancred Ibsen
- Written by: Alex Brinchmann (play); Tancred Ibsen
- Starring: Lauritz Falk; Nanna Stenersen; Per Aabel; Wenche Foss
- Release date: 1942
- Running time: 97 minutes
- Country: Norway
- Language: Norwegian

The Dangerous Game (Norwegian: Den farlige leken) is a 1942 Norwegian comedy film directed by Tancred Ibsen, starring Lauritz Falk, Nanna Stenersen and Per Aabel. The film is based on Alex Brinchmann's successful stage comedy Karusell (Merry-Go-Round).

A Swedish version of the film was made in 1943, titled Som du vill ha mej, directed by Gösta Cederlund, with the Swedish script was by Tancred Ibsen and Kid Bruncrona.

== Plot ==
The lively and sociable Jean Blom (Falk) likes to party and feels held back by his wife (Stenersen), whom he considers boring, for being homely by nature, and preferring to spend time with her family. He plots to give her a recently developed experimental hormone injection to make her more lively. She overhears the plan and switches the drug with water. The only desire she then develops is one of revenge.
