= Victor Borg =

Norwegian physician, novelist, playwright and script writer

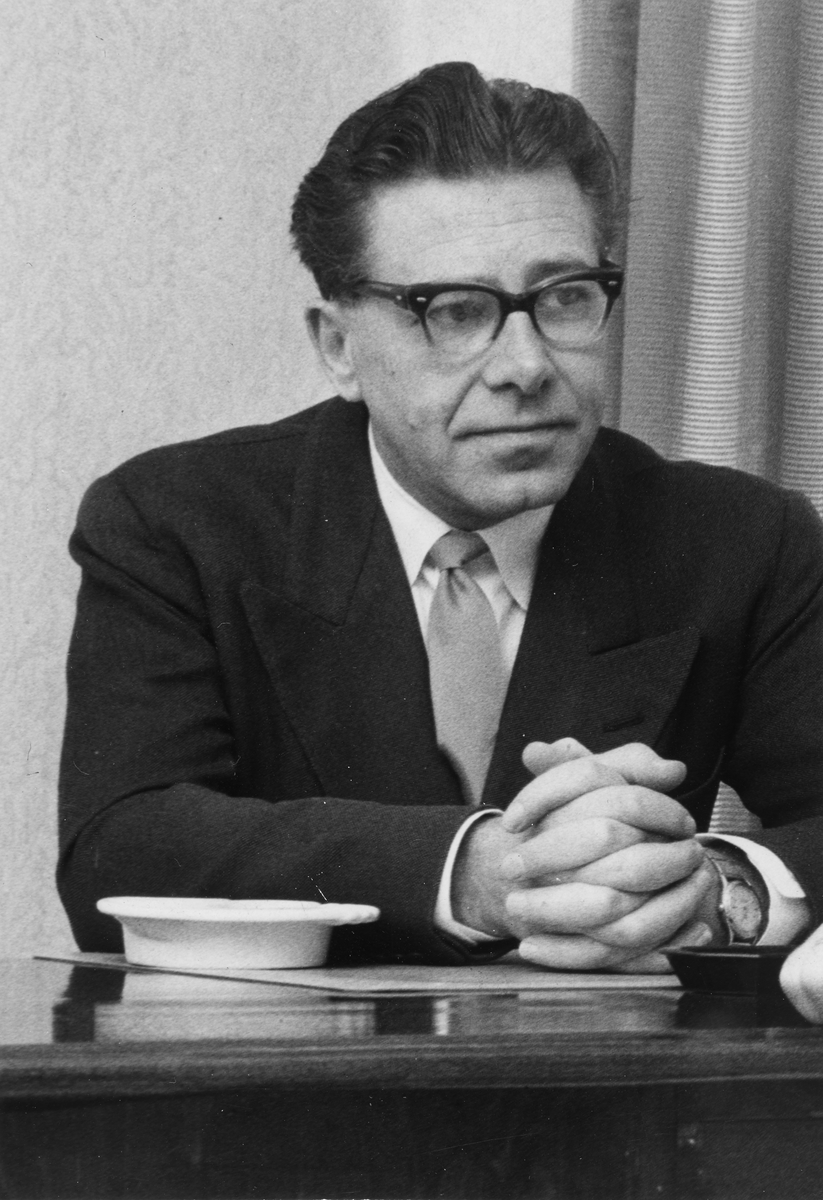
Victor Borg, 1961

Victor Borg (8 April 1916 – 27 June 1996) was a Norwegian physician, novelist, playwright and script writer.

Borg was born in Kristiania and was a physician at the institution Blå Kors from 1959 to 1983. He wrote several books on alcoholism and drug abuse, including Trøster og tyrann (1962), Narkomani (1970), and Skadeskutt: ungdom og narkotika (1977). He wrote several plays, scripts for the films Skadeskutt (1951), Broder Gabrielsen (1966), and Himmel og helvete (1969), and several novels and short stories.
