= Toralf Sandø =

Norwegian film director and actor (1899–1970)

- Born: 6 April 1899; Flatanger Municipality
- Died: 4 March 1970; Bærum
- Resting place: Ullern cemetery
- Occupations: Actor, film director, screenwriter

Toralf Sandø (April 6, 1899 in Flatanger – March 4, 1970) was a Norwegian film director and actor. He also read Olav Duun books for NRK Radio.

== Selected filmography ==
- 1936: Vi bygger landet
- 1937: By og land hand i hand
- 1937: To levende og en død
- 1938: Bør Børson Jr.
- 1941: Den forsvundne pølsemaker
- 1942: Det æ'kke te å tru
- 1944: Kommer du, Elsa?
- 1952: Trine!
