= Leif Sinding =

Norwegian film director (1895–1985)

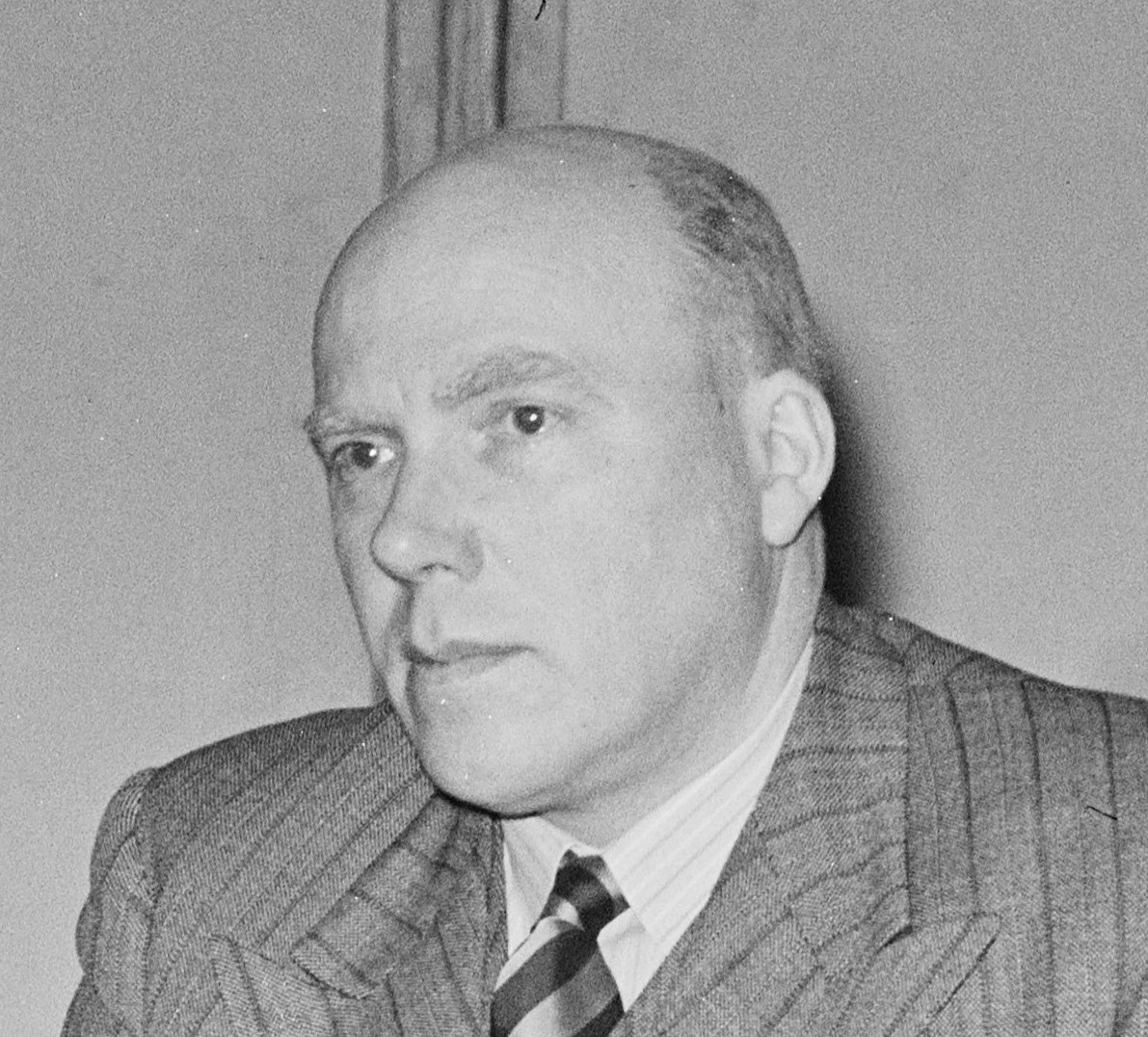
- 1942 NTB (Norwegian News Agency)
- Born: 19 November 1895; Norway
- Died: 13 May 1985 (aged 89); Norway
- Occupations: Film director, journalist
- Spouse: Ellen Buttedahl (m. 1919; died 1980)

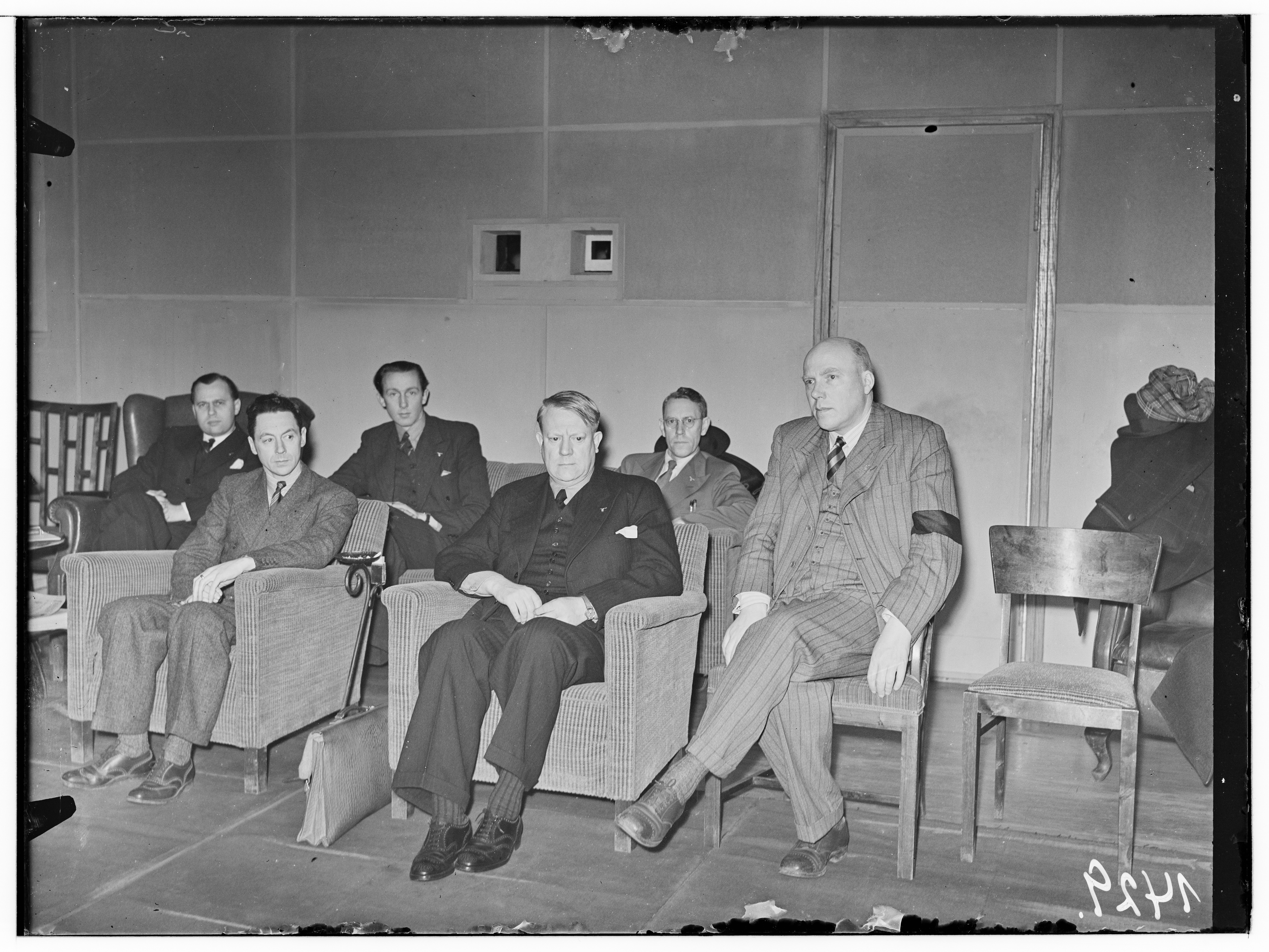
From left, Rolf Jørgen Fuglesang, Gulbrand Lunde, Bjarne Holst, Vidkun Quisling, Anders Beggerud and director Leif Sinding, during a visit to Statens Filmdirektorat in 1942.

Leif Sinding (19 November 1895 – 13 May 1985) was a Norwegian film director and journalist.

He worked for the newspapers Verdens Gang, Aftenposten, and Morgenbladet. Among his silent films are Himmeluret from 1925, based on Gabriel Scott's comedy, and Fjeldeventyret from 1926. He directed the film Bra mennesker (1937), based on a play by Oskar Braaten, and the films De vergeløse (1939) and Tante Pose (1940), both based on novels by Gabriel Scott. In 1941 he directed the comedy Kjærlighet og vennskap. During the German occupation of Norway Sinding collaborated with the Axis forces, was a member of Nasjonal Samling, and was sentenced to four years forced labour after the war.

== Filmography ==
- Himmeluret (1925)
- Simen Mustrøens besynderlige opplevelser (1926)
- Den nye lensmannen (1926)
- Syv dage for Elisabeth (1927)
- Fjeldeventyret (1927)
- Fantegutten (1932)
- Jeppe på bjerget (1933)
- Morderen uten ansikt (1936)
- Bra mennesker (1937)
- Eli Sjursdotter (1938)
- De vergeløse (1939)
- Tante Pose (1940)
- Kjærlighet og vennskap (1941)
- Sangen til livet (1943)
- Selkvinnen (1953)
- Heksenetter (1954)
- Gylne ungdom (1956)
