= List of Norwegian films of the 1930s =

Films produced in Norway in the 1930s:

== 1930s ==
Title	Director	Cast	Genre	Notes
1930
Eskimo	George Schnéevoigt		Drama	
Kristine Valdresdatter	Rasmus Breistein		Drama	
Over Besseggen på motorcykel			Documentary	
Mot ukjent land			Documentary	
Fra sneblokaden på høifjeldet	Ottar Gladvedt		Documentary	
Ro-ro til fiskeskjær			Animation, short	
Det er natt			Animation, short	
1931
Den store barnedåpen	Tancred Ibsen		Drama, Comedy	Tancred Ibsen's debut as a feature film director.; First Norwegian movie with sound.
Glimt fra New York og den norske koloni			Documentary	
1932
En glad gutt	John W. Brunius		Drama	
Fantegutten	Leif Sinding		Drama	
Lalla vinner!	Erling Bergendahl, George Schnéevoigt		Family	
Prinsessen som ingen kunne målbinde	Walter Fyrst		Family	
Skjærgårdsflirt	Rasmus Breistein		Romantic drama	
Vi som går köksvägen	Gustaf Molander		Comedy	
1933
I kongens klær	Finn Myklegård		Comedy	
Jeppe på Bjerget	Per Aabel, Harry Ivarson		Comedy	
Vi som går kjøkkenveien	Tancred Ibsen		Comedy, romance	
Op med hodet!	Tancred Ibsen		Comedy, musical	
1934
The Girl of Solbakken	Tancred Ibsen		Drama	Based on the novel by Bjørnstjerne Bjørnson, the grandfather of Tancred Ibsen; Swedish production
Liv	Rasmus Breistein		Drama	
Sangen om Rondane	Helge Lunde		Romantic drama	
Syndere i sommersol	Einar Sissener		Drama	
Eventyret om de tre bukkene bruse			Animation, short	
Pål sine høner			Animation, short	
Den lystige radio-trio			Animation, short	
1935
Du har lovet mig en kone!	Einar Sissener, Tancred Ibsen		Comedy	
Perhaps a Gentleman!	Ragnar Arvedson, Tancred Ibsen		Comedy	Swedish production co-directed by the Norwegian director Tancred Ibsen
Samhold må til	Olav Dalgard		Short	
Kronprinsparets reise i Nord Norge			Documentary	
Hvor isbjørnen ferdes	Thor Iversen		Documentary	
Stormangrep			Animation, short	
1936
Ä vi gifta?	Ragnar Arvedson, Tancred Ibsen		Comedy	Swedish production co-directed by the Norwegian director Tancred Ibsen
Morderen uten ansikt	Titus Vibe-Müller, Leif Sinding		Crime	
Norge for folket	Helge Lunde		Drama	
Spöket på Bragehus	Ragnar Arvedson, Tancred Ibsen		Comedy	Swedish production co-directed by the Norwegian director Tancred Ibsen
Stackars miljonärer	Ragnar Arvedson, Tancred Ibsen		Comedy	Swedish production co-directed by the Norwegian director Tancred Ibsen
Vi bygger landet	Olav Dalgard		Drama	
Vi vil oss et land...	Ernst Ottersen		Short/drama	
En fargesymfoni i blått			Animation, short	
1937
Bra mennesker	Leif Sinding		Drama	
By og land hand i hand	Olav Dalgard		Drama	
Fant	Tancred Ibsen	Alfred Maurstad	Drana	
To levende og en død	Gyda Christensen, Tancred Ibsen		Crime, Drama	Co-directed by Tancred Ibsen's wife, Lillebil Ibsen, under the alias "Gyda Christensen"
Waardige vertegenwoordiging	Hans Fischerkoesen		Animation, short	
Et mesterverk			Animation, short	
1938
Bør Børson Jr.	Toralf Sandø		Comedy	
Det drønner gjennom dalen	Olav Dalgard		Drama	
Eli Sjursdotter	Arne Bornebusch, Leif Sinding		Drama	
Lenkene brytes	Olav Dalgard, Fredrik Barth		Drama	
Norge - et dikt i billeder	Julius Sandemeier		Documentary	
Ungen	Rasmus Breistein		Drama	
Et orientalsk kunststykke			Animation, short	
Kalifens hemmelighet	Hans Fischerkoesen, Desider Gross		Animation, short	
En Harmony	Desider Gross		Animation, short	
Sjakk matt	Hans Fischerkoesen		Animation, short	
Tenor			Animation, short	
En sigarett - en drøm	Hans Fischerkoesen		Animation, short	
1939
Familien på Borgan	Helge Lunde		Drama	
Gjest Baardsen	Tancred Ibsen	Alfred Maurstad	Biopic, Crime Comedy	
Gryr i Norden	Olav Dalgard		Drama	
Hu Dagmar	Rasmus Breistein		Comedy/drama	
Til Vesterheimen			Documentary	
Valfångare	Tancred Ibsen, Anders Henrikson		Drama	Swedish production, but the film is set in the Norwegian whaling town of Sandefjord.
De vergeløse	Leif Sinding		Drama	
