= Jens Holstad =

Norwegian actor (1889–1961)

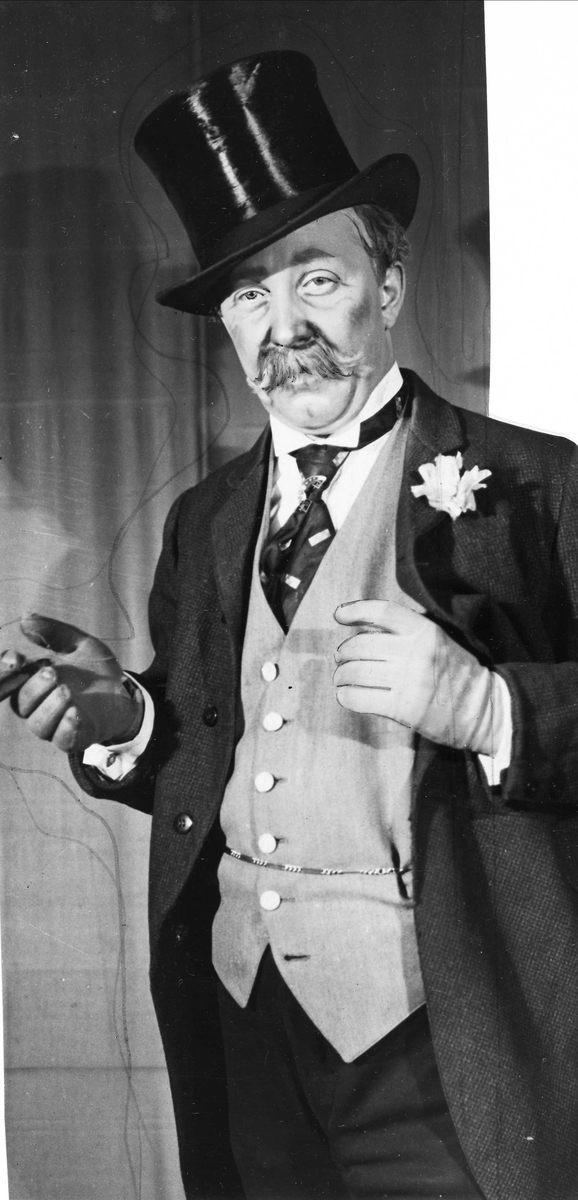
- Born: January 30, 1889; Kristiania (now Oslo), Norway
- Died: October 6, 1961 (aged 72); Drammen, Norway
- Occupation: Actor

Jens Holstad (January 30, 1889 – October 6, 1961) was a Norwegian actor.

Holstad was born in Kristiania (now Oslo), and he made his stage debut in 1906 at the Fahlstrøm Theater. He made his film debut in 1912 in Adam Eriksen's film Anny – en gatepiges roman. He was most active in the 1930s and 1940s, and he appeared in a total of twelve film roles, with his last in Ti gutter og en gjente in 1944. Alongside films, Holstad was also active in theater, where he was involved with the New Theater from the 1920s to the 1950s. He also performed at the National Theater in Oslo. Holstad also recorded gramophone records.

== Filmography ==
- 1912: Anny – en gatepiges roman
- 1926: Baldevins bryllup as Hoppe, a carpenter
- 1932: Lalla vinner! as Jonassen, a tent operator at the Tivoli amusement park
- 1935: Du har lovet mig en kone! as the passenger
- 1936: Vi bygger landet as Larsen
- 1937: By og land hand i hand as Larsen
- 1939: Gjest Baardsen as an officer
- 1940: Tørres Snørtevold as Halvor
- 1941: Kjærlighet og vennskap as a caretaker
- 1941: Hansen og Hansen as Dingstad
- 1941: Gullfjellet as Mons Listerud
- 1944: Ti gutter og en gjente as a music dealer
