= Baldevins bryllup =

1926 film

- Directed by: George Schnéevoigt
- Written by: Vilhelm Krag; Alf Rød
- Starring: Einar Sissener; Victor Bernau
- Release date: 22 November 1926
- Running time: 126 minutes
- Country: Norway
- Language: Norwegian

Baldevins bryllup (English: Baldevin's wedding) is a 1926 Norwegian comedy film directed by George Schnéevoigt, starring Einar Sissener and Victor Bernau. The film is based on a play by Vilhelm Krag, and tells the story of how Simen Sørensen (Bernau) manages to get his friend Baldevin Jonassen (Sissener) married to the lady next door. The film was renovated in 2006, for the 100th anniversary of Kristiansand Cinema.

== Plot ==
Baldevin and Simen strike up a friendship during a voyage, but eventually part ways. Years later, Simen is wedded to a prosperous widow. Upon Baldevin's return to town, Simen endeavors to secure his friend's prosperity by arranging a marriage with another widow. As they navigate their newfound relationships, both men strive to conceal their dubious pasts. However, the widows harbor secrets of their own. Ultimately, when the truths come to light, the situation is resolved harmoniously, culminating in yet another wedding.

== Cast ==
- Einar Sissener as Baldevin Jonassen
- Victor Bernau as Simen Sørensen
- Johanne Voss as Ollevine
- Betzy Holter as Madam Salvesen
- Jens Holstad as Hoppe, a carpenter
- Nicolai Johannsen as Braa, a skipper
- Hilda Fredriksen as Miss Bertelsen
- Sverre Arnesen as Müller, a shipping master in Lübeck
- Amund Rydland as a silverware thief
- Karl Holter as a butcher
- Ernst Albert as an innkeeper
