= Karin Meyer =

Swedish–Norwegian actress (1897–1963)

- Born: January 9, 1897; Dalarna, Sweden
- Died: August 9, 1963 (aged 66); Buenos Aires, Argentina
- Occupation: Actress

Karin Meyer (née Karin Eugenea Johansson, January 9, 1897 – August 9, 1963) was a Swedish–Norwegian actress.

Meyer was born in Dalarna, Sweden. She performed at the National Theater in Oslo from 1922 to 1943. This was interrupted by a hiatus from 1928 to 1936, when she resigned from the National Theater and performed at the Carl Johan Theater and the New Theater, including in Henrik Ibsen's play Catiline in 1935.

In the 1930s, Meyer also played roles on the radio. When Sigurd Hoel published Møte ved milepelen (Meeting at the Milestone) in 1947, she was one of the role models for the "dissatisfied and unsuccessful" group. She was married to the trade union politician Håkon Meyer from 1917 to 1928, and she then married the advertising manager Bjarne Lysholm Sellæg (1892–1951) in 1928. They emigrated to Buenos Aires in 1947.

== Awards ==
- 1926: Government artist scholarship, NOK 500
- 1938: Government scholarship

== Filmography ==
- 1917: De Forældreløse as the dance enthusiast
- 1937: Fant as Peder's wife
- 1939: De vergeløse as Albert's mother
- 1943: Unge viljer as Jensen's wife
- 1944: Ti gutter og en gjente as Markus's mother
- 1944: Brudekronen as Marte
