= Martin Gisti =

Norwegian actor

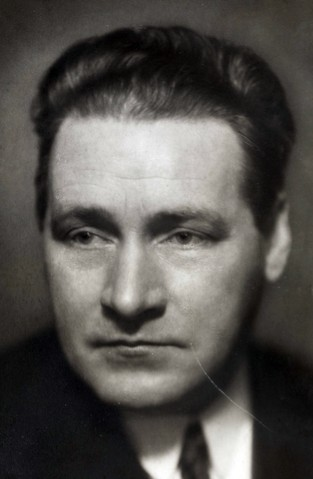
- Born: December 9, 1889; Våler, Norway
- Died: January 18, 1971 (aged 81)
- Occupation: Actor
- Years active: 1920–1972

Martin Gisti (December 9, 1889 – January 18, 1971) was a Norwegian actor. He made his film debut in Kaksen paa Øverland in 1920.

Together with Amund Rydland, he wrote the script for the 1922 film Farende folk. He was also responsible for the rehearsal of the audio play Fridtjof Nansen – en helt fra vår egen tid (Fridtjof Nansen: A Hero of Our Own Time), which premiered on NRK radio, which was then directed by Nasjonal Samling, on December 1, 1941.

== Filmography ==
- 1920: Kaksen paa Øverland as Halvor, a servant boy
- 1922: Farende folk as Mjøltraavaren
- 1925: Himmeluret as Ola Ormestøl
- 1926: Simen Mustrøens besynderlige opplevelser as Simen Mustrøen
- 1932: Deception (never completed)
- 1938: Det drønner gjennom dalen as a strikebreaker
- 1938: Ungen as Engebret
- 1939: Gryr i Norden as Karlsen, a stevedore
- 1939: Hu Dagmar as Embret Storberget
- 1941: Gullfjellet as Jørgen Krullerstugun
- 1942: Trysil-Knut as Silver-Jan, a Swedish peddler
- 1943: Unge viljer as Albert Jensen, a worker
- 1944: Brudekronen as Mikkel
- 1955: Trost i taklampa as Lundjordet
- 1961: Fru Inger til Østråt as Bjørn
- 1963: Freske fraspark
- 1972: Motforestilling (extra)
