= Unge viljer =

- Directed by: Walter Fyrst
- Written by: Walter Fyrst
- Produced by: Arne Tellefsen
- Starring: Martin Gisti; Karl Aagaard Østvig Jr. Johan Hauge; Anne-Eline Christie; Einar Tveito; Karin Meyer; Alf Strømsnes; Borger Jahr; Victor Lindzén; Betzy Holter
- Cinematography: Sixten Andersen
- Edited by: Walter Fyrst
- Music by: Thorvald Lammers Jr.
- Distributed by: Norsk Film A/S
- Release date: February 8, 1943
- Running time: 93 minutes
- Country: Norway
- Language: Norwegian

Unge viljer (Young Wills) is a Norwegian film from 1943 written and directed by Walter Fyrst. It is about an upper-class girl and a working-class boy that join forces and become members of Nasjonal Samling (NS), Vidkun Quisling's far-right political party before and during World War II. Unge viljer is a "state political" propaganda film that purports to depict the difficult social conditions in Norway in the 1930s that led to the formation of the NS in 1933. This is the only Norwegian film produced during the war with a Nasjonal Samling ideology. The film premiered at the Victoria Cinema in Oslo on February 8, 1943.

== Background ==
Walter Fyrst (1901–1993) was a film and advertising man that took the initiative in 1932 to form the Labor Array (Norwegian: Arbeidsfylkingen), an organization for voluntary work among unemployed young people. He was strongly involved in issues of unemployment and class struggle, and Unge viljer is largely about these issues. Fyrst was responsible for the script, direction, and production of the film.

The male lead role of Tor Jansen, the worker's son that falls in love with Liv West, the daughter of his father's employer, was played by Karl Aagaard Østvig Jr. (1925–1944). The amateur actor was the son of the opera singer Karl Aagaard Østvig (1889–1968), who himself played a lawyer in the film. The young protagonist was killed as a soldier on the Eastern Front the year after the film premiered, only 19 years old.

== Plot ==
The film begins in 1933. In the home of Albert Jensen, a worker, he and his wife are struggling to give their son Tor a good education. Tor is a student at the high school together with Liv West, the daughter of Jensen's employer. Jensen tries to mediate during a labor dispute in the workshop, with the result that he is fired. Jensen's wife dies, and Tor has to leave school because his father cannot get a job. The father and son stand in line every day among thousands of unemployed people looking for work. The Marxist trade union movement persecutes Jensen, who eventually drowns himself in despair.

When West, the company director, discovers that Liv loves the son of a worker, he sends her away to an English college. Tor believes that she no longer wants to have anything to do with him, and travels doing voluntary labor service. He arrives at a new farm run by Bjørn Storhaug, a farmer who has been evicted from his allodial farm by director West. Bjørn advises Tor to clear and cultivate a new farm in Valdres, and he follows this advice.

After three years, Liv returns from England. She is now an adult, and she breaks ties with her father. After a long but fruitless search for Tor, she also travels doing voluntary labor service, where she finds Tor.

== Cast ==
- Martin Gisti as Albert Jensen, a worker
- Karl Aagaard Østvig Jr. as Tor, his son
- Johan Hauge as West, a company director
- Anne Eline Christie as Liv, his daughter
- Einar Tveito as Bjørn Storhaug, a farmer
- Karin Meyer as Jensen's wife
- Alf Strømsnes as Kristian, Tor's cousin
- Borger Jahr as Anton, Tor's friend
- Victor Lindzén as a communist leader
- Betzy Holter as Mrs. West
