= Ragnhild Fredriksen =

Norwegian actress (1882–1963)

- Born: September 29, 1882; Kristiania (now Oslo), Norway
- Died: December 15, 1963 (aged 81); Oslo, Norway
- Occupation: Actress
- Spouse: Ingolf Schanche
- Relatives: Hilda Fredriksen

Ragnhild Fredriksen (September 29, 1882 – December 15, 1963) was a Norwegian stage actress.

== Family ==
Ragnhild Fredriksen was born in Kristiania (now Oslo), Norway, as the daughter of the police officer Carl Fredriksen (1847–1902) and Maren Gustava Gulliksen (1848–1924). She was the sister of the actress Hilda Fredriksen (1873–1945). She married the actor Ingolf Schanche in 1905 in Kristiania.

== Career ==
Ragnhild Fredriksen debuted on February 2, 1902, at the Central Theater in the play Ungdomsleg. She was engaged at the Central Theater until 1903. She started performing at the Fahlstrøm Theater when it opened on August 22, 1903.

== Selected roles ==
- The young girl in Ungdomsleg by Frederik Leth Hansen (Central Theater, 1902)
- Natasha in The Lower Depths (Norwegian title: Nattasylet) by Maxim Gorky (Fahlstrøm Theater, 1905)
