= Kolbjørn Brenda =

Norwegian actor

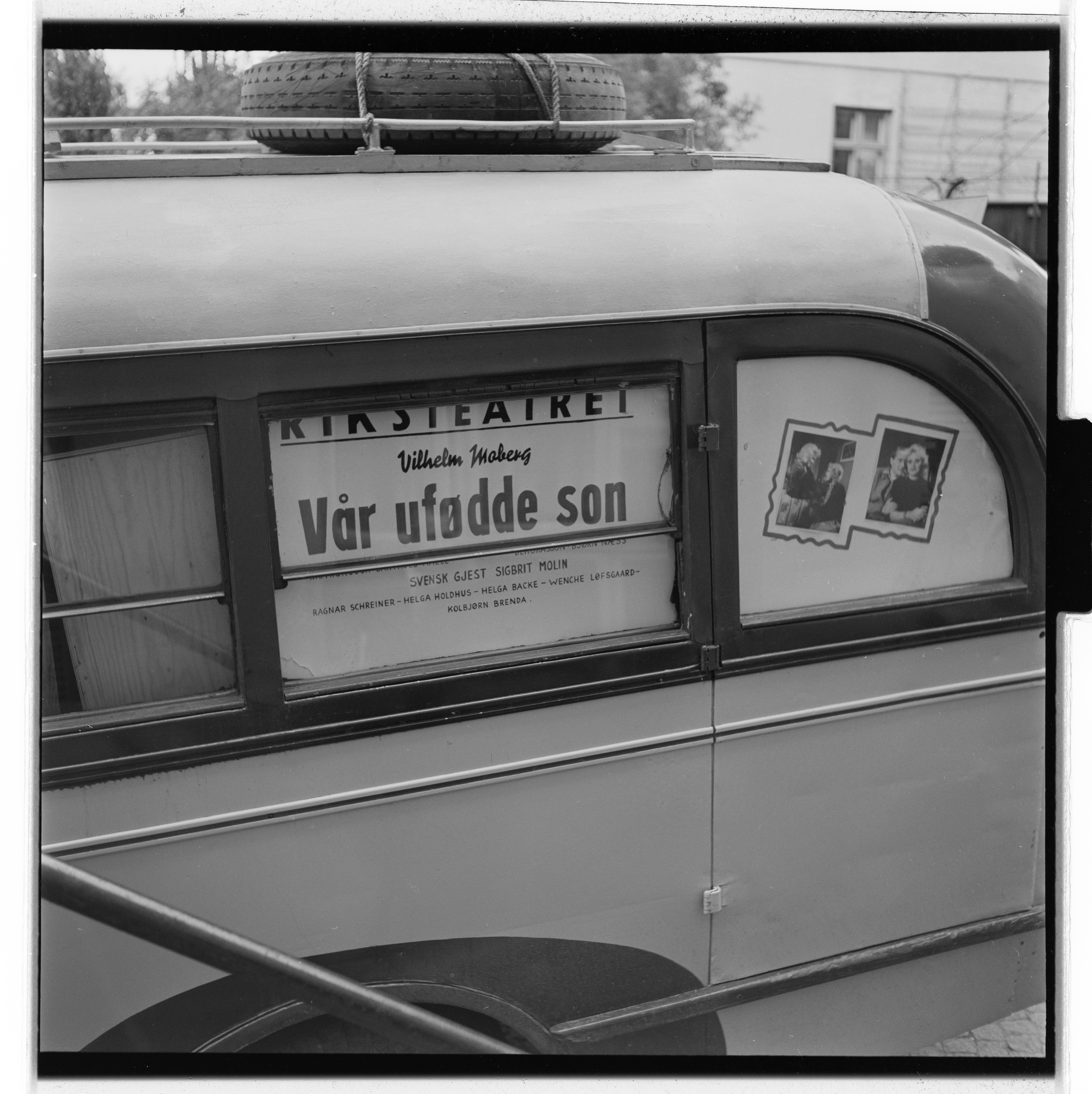
- Born: March 9, 1914; Elverum, Norway
- Died: January 15, 1988 (aged 73)
- Resting place: Old Aker Cemetery
- Occupation: Actor

Kolbjørn Brenda (March 9, 1914 – January 15, 1988) was a Norwegian actor.

Brenda debuted in 1936 at the Søilen Theater in Oslo and was engaged there until 1939. He performed for eight years at the Falkberget Theater and two years at the Rogaland Theater, and from 1951 onward his artistic versatility made him a central figure in the ensemble at the National Traveling Theater. Among others roles, he played Jeppe in Erasmus Montanus, seven roles in Peer Gynt in the same performance, and Dr. Onsø in Nils Kjær's Det lykkelige valg (The Happy Election). Brenda's parting role was the carpenter Engstrand in Ghosts. In the 1930s he was active in Norwegian film, especially in Olav Dalgard's films. In the film To levende og en død (1937), Brenda played one of the postal workers. In 1975 he had the lead role in Streik!

Brenda received the King's Medal of Merit in gold in 1986.

== Filmography ==
- 1937: To levende og en død as a postal clerk
- 1937: By og land hand i hand as Anton
- 1938: Det drønner gjennom dalen as a forest worker
- 1938: Lenkene brytes as the chairman
- 1939: Gryr i Norden as Adolf
- 1942: Trysil-Knut as a farm boy
- 1949: Aldri mer!
- 1949: Døden er et kjærtegn as the town bailiff
- 1973: Kirsebærhaven as the station master
- 1973: Miranda as a guest
- 1975: Streik! as Knut Martinsen
