= Hilda Fredriksen =

Norwegian actress (1873–1945)

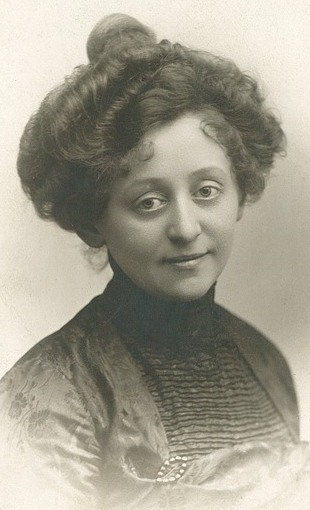
- Hilda Fredriksen in the late 1890s
- Born: December 10, 1873; Kristiania (now Oslo), Norway
- Died: June 30, 1945 (aged 71); Oslo, Norway
- Occupation: Actress
- Relatives: Ragnhild Fredriksen

Hilda Fredriksen (December 10, 1873 – June 30, 1945) was a Norwegian stage and film actress.

== Family ==
Hilda Fredriksen was born in Kristiania (now Oslo), Norway, as the daughter of the police officer Carl Fredriksen (1847–1902) and Maren Gustava Gulliksen (1848–1924). She was the sister of the actress Ragnhild Fredriksen (1882–1963), who married the actor Ingolf Schanche. Hilda Fredriksen was unmarried.

== Life and work ==
Hilda Fredriksen was performing in an itinerant Danish theater when she made her stage debut in Arendal in 1891. Between 1897 and 1899, she participated in productions at the Christiania Theater, including as Ane in Bjørnstjerne Bjørnson's Geografi og Kærlighed in 1898.

In the 1890s she also played at the Eldorado Theater, the Carl Johan Theater in Christiania's Tivoli district, and Harald Otto's Norwegian theater company. In the 1900–1901 season, she was at the National Theater in Oslo, and then at the National Theater in Bergen from 1901 to 1912. After her stay in Bergen, she returned to her hometown of Kristiania and the Central Theater.

From the 1920s onward, Hilda Fredriksen mostly performed as a film actress.

== Theater roles ==
- Ane in Geografi og Kærlighed by Bjørnstjerne Bjørnson (Christiania Theater, 1898)
- Regine in Ghosts by Henrik Ibsen (Eldorado Theater)
- Emilia in Othello by William Shakespeare (Eldorado Theater)
- Councilor Mørk in Korsvei by Helene Dickmar (National Theater, Bergen)
- Madam Hoppestad in Faddergaven by Peter Egge (National Theater, Bergen)
- Lucia in Cavalleria rusticana by Pietro Mascagni (National Theater, Bergen)
- Madame Brocard in Gri-Gri (Central Theater, 1914)
- Mrs. Cornichon in Papas lille pike (Chat Noir, 1919)

== Filmography ==
- 1926: Baldevins bryllup as Miss Bertelsen
- 1927: Madame besøker Oslo as Albert's wife
- 1927: Syv dage for Elisabeth as Henriette Kaspar
- 1931: Den store barnedåpen as a woman
- 1931: Lika inför lagen as the chief warden
- 1933: En stille flirt as Maja, a costume assistant
- 1933: I kongens klær as Krestian's wife
- 1933: Vi som går kjøkkenveien as Laura, Beck's cook
- 1937: By og land hand i hand as the woman from Ullern
- 1937: To levende og en død as the boarding house keeper
- 1938: Bør Børson Jr. as the hotel keeper
- 1940: Tørres Snørtevold as Aunt Sofie
- 1941: Hansen og Hansen as an offended lady
- 1942: Den farlige leken
