= Sigurd Magnussøn =

Norwegian theater director and actor

- Born: December 14, 1889; Skien, Norway
- Died: November 12, 1961 (aged 71)
- Occupation(s): Theater director and actor
- Spouse: Abigael Heber Magnussøn

Sigurd Konrad Magnussøn (December 14, 1889 – November 12, 1961) was a Norwegian theater director and actor.

On August 14, 1912 he married the actress Abigael Heber.

Magnussøn was a student at the Fahlstrøm Theater from 1906 to 1907. From 1908 to 1911 and from 1912 to 1920 he was an actor at the National Theater in Oslo. Then he was at the National Theater in Bergen from 1921 to 1922. In 1921 and 1922 he also directed the experimental Intimteatret theater, where Agnes Mowinckel debuted as a stage director and Olafr Havrevold debuted as an actor. From 1922 to 1931 he was engaged at Chat Noir, the Trondheim National Theater, the Casino Theater in Oslo, and the Oslo New Theater. From 1931 to 1935 he was at the Norwegian Theater. His last theater was the National Theater in Oslo. He was employed there from 1936 until the theater was closed by the German occupation authorities in 1942 and, when the theater was reopened in 1945, he returned to the National Theater.

Sigurd Magnussøn also appeared in a number of Norwegian films. Both he and his wife Abigael starred in the blockbuster film Fant, which premiered in 1937.

== Filmography ==
- 1935: Samhold må til as the office manager
- 1937: Fant as Peder
- 1939: Gjest Baardsen as a constable
- 1939: Gryr i Norden as the factory manager
- 1940: Tørres Snørtevold as the bailiff
- 1941: Kjærlighet og vennskap as the doctor
- 1941: Gullfjellet as the council head
- 1941: Nygift as the manufacturer Fritjof Jensen
- 1942: Trysil-Knut as the bailiff
- 1946: Vi vil leve as the doctor at Grini
- 1946: Englandsfarere as the skipper
- 1947: Sankt Hans fest as an official
- 1951: Storfolk og småfolk as a judge
- 1952: Andrine og Kjell as Mr. Bergan
- 1952: Trine! as Pandahl, an auditor
- 1953: Flukt fra paradiset as the principal
- 1954: Portrettet as Langerud, a teacher
- 1954: I moralens navn as old Krahn-Johnsen
