= Gunnar Simenstad =

Norwegian actor (1914–1986)

- Born: May 14, 1914; Kristiania (now Oslo), Norway
- Died: February 2, 1986 (aged 71)
- Occupation: Actor

Gunnar Simenstad (May 14, 1914 – February 2, 1986) was a Norwegian actor. In addition to his stage career, he appeared in several films.

== Filmography ==
- 1935: Du har lovet mig en kone! as Marlow
- 1937: By og land hand i hand as Adolf, a construction worker
- 1940: Frestelse as Ole Arntsen
- 1943: Sangen til livet as Nordahl
- 1951: Skadeskutt as Rolf Lunde, a doctor
- 1953: Den evige Eva as Einar Berge, an estate agent
- 1954: Slik kan det gjøres. Husmorfilmen 1954
- 1966: Skrift i sne
- 1974: Kimen as the third farmer
- 1976: Oss as the commander-in-chief
