= Gunvor Hall =

Norwegian actress (1908–1961)

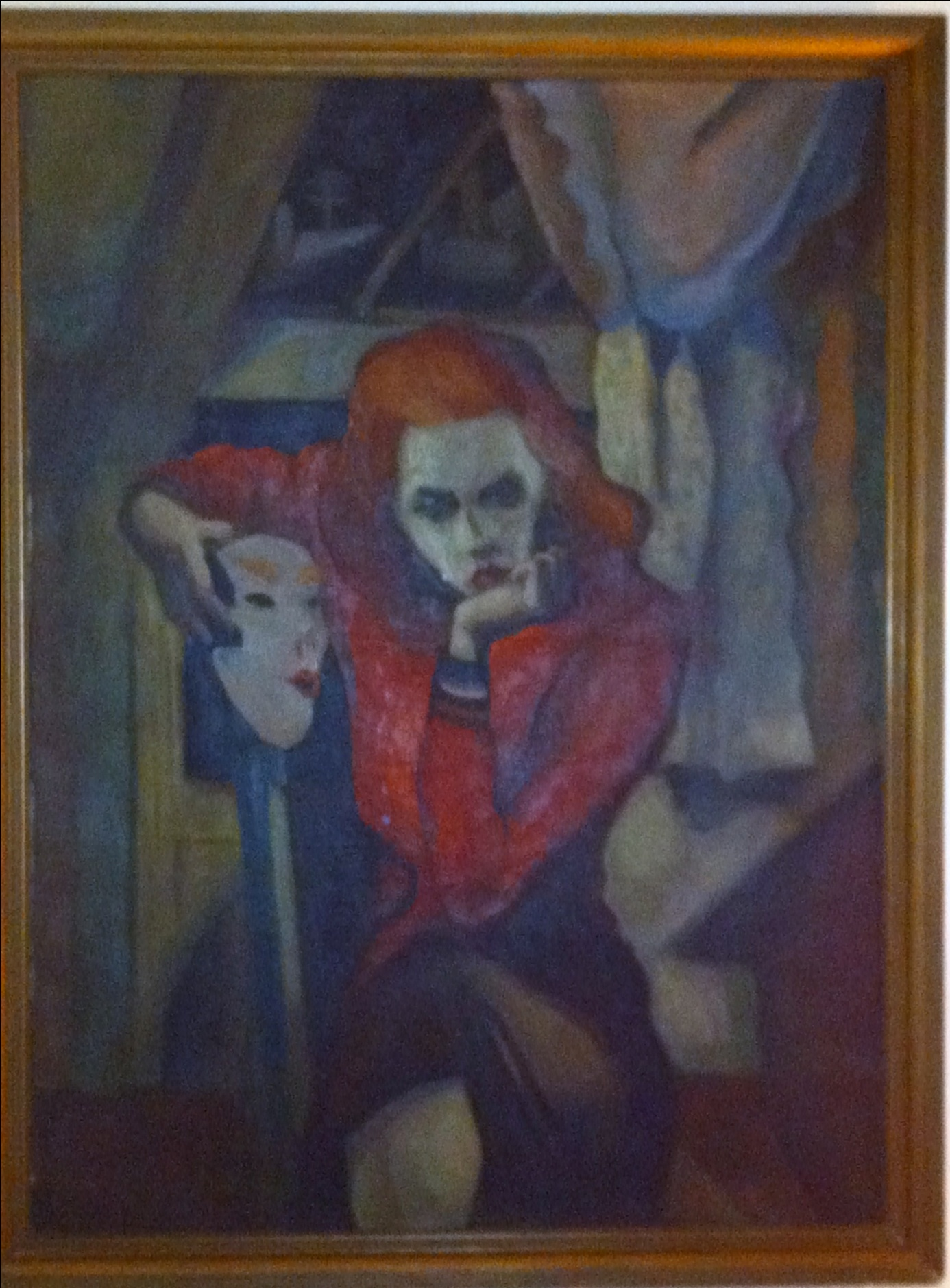
- Born: November 26, 1908; Kristiania, Norway
- Died: November 19, 1961 (aged 52); Oslo, Norway
- Occupation: Actress

Gunvor Hall (November 26, 1908 – November 19, 1961) was a Norwegian actress.

Hall was born in Kristiania (now Oslo), the daughter of the wholesaler Vegard Hall (1876–1928) and Anna Homble (1882–1910). She performed at the Oslo New Theater from 1929 to 1957 and worked as a film actress. She debuted in 1939 in Olav Dalgard's film Gryr i Norden (Dawn in the North). Throughout her career, she appeared in five films from 1939 to 1958.

Hall married the actor Tore Foss in 1934. She married a second time in 1942 to the singer, theater manager, and poet Jens Gunderssen.

== Filmography ==
- 1939: Gryr i Norden
- 1942: En herre med bart
- 1942: Jeg drepte!
- 1944: Kommer du, Elsa?
- 1951: Alice in Wonderland (dubbed into Norwegian as Alice i Eventyrland), narrator
- 1958: Ut av mørket
