= Solveig Haugan =

Norwegian actress and writer (1901–1953)

- Born: November 1, 1901; Trondheim, Norway
- Died: June 8, 1953 (aged 51)
- Occupations: actress and writer
- Notable work: Gryr i Norden

Solveig Haugan (November 1, 1901 – June 8, 1953) was a Norwegian stage and movie actress and writer.

Solveig Haugan was born on November 1, 1901, in Trondheim, Norway. She appeared most notably on the stage in the Trøndelag Teater production of På Kobberstad and the Det Norske Teatret production of Ungen from the book Ungen: folkeliv i 4 akter (Oslo: Aschehoug, 1911) written by novelist Oskar Braaten (1881–1939).

Solveig Haugan is perhaps best remembered for her performance as Maja in the film Gryr i Norden released in Norway in 1939. Gryr i Norden was based on the true story of Norway's Kristiania Match Workers Strike of 1889 (fyrstikkarbeiderstreiken i Kristiania) at the Østre Aker match factory of Bryn og Grønvolds Tændstikfabriker in Oslo. The film was written and directed by Norwegian filmmaker Olav Dalgard (1898–1980).

Solveig Haugan also wrote short stories for Arbeiderbladet published by the Norwegian Labour Party. She was the author of the novel Av jord er du kommet (Oslo: Falken, 1952) about the industrialization of agriculture. She died on June 8, 1953, aged 51.
