= Himmeluret =

1925 film

- Directed by: Amund Rydland; Leif Sinding
- Written by: Leif Sinding
- Based on: Gabriel Scott's play and novella Himmeluret
- Starring: David Knudsen; Gunvor Fjørtoft; Hjalmar Fries
- Cinematography: Reidar Lund
- Distributed by: Cinema A/S
- Release date: 1925
- Running time: 95 minutes
- Country: Norway
- Language: Norwegian

Himmeluret (The Clock of Heaven or The Celestial Clockwork) is a Norwegian silent film from 1925 directed by Amund Rydland and Leif Sinding. Sinding also wrote the screenplay, which is based on Gabriel Scott's comedy Himmeluret (play 1905, novella 1908). David Knudsen, Gunvor Fjørtoft, and Hjalmar Fries appeared in the main roles. Footage described as a "closeup of a naked woman" (naken kvinne forstørret) was cut from the film by censors. The film is now considered lost.

== Plot ==
In Rørland, the ship owner Gutter Fladen is the dominant personality in the town. His daughter Nina has just returned from Paris, and she spends the spring evenings with her childhood love Salve, a skipper on Gutter's boat Haabet.

== Cast ==
- David Knudsen: Gutter Fladen, a ship owner
- Gunvor Fjørtoft: Nina, the ship owner's daughter
- Hjalmar Fries: Salve, a skipper
- Amund Rydland: Brother Daniel
- Katie Rolfsen: Theodine (credited as Käthie Rolfsen)
- Lars Tvinde: Lars Timiansbakken
- Eugen Skjønberg: Andresen, a general store operator
- Josef Sjøgren: Kristensen, a watchmaker
- Ragnvald Wingar: Rasmussen, a cobbler
- Johanne Voss: Gurine on the stairs, a gossip
- Aagot Nissen: Johanne in the door, a gossip
- Martin Gisti: Ola Ormestøl
- Ingse Gude Caprino: Conchita
- Ruth Brünings-Sandvik: Juanita, a dancer in a restaurant
- Kolbjørn Skjefstad: a bartender
