= Cecil Aagaard =

Norwegian musician (1916–1984)

- Born: 18 September 1916; Larvik, Norway
- Died: 19 December 1984 (aged 68)
- Occupations: Jazz vocalist and band leader

Cecil Aagaard (18 September 1916 – 19 December 1984) was a Norwegian jazz vocalist and bandleader.

Dubbed "The biggest thing in swing" in Scandinavia's jazz milieu, he was active in Norway's swing movement (referred to as kløverjazz).

== Early life and education ==
He was born in Larvik.

== Career ==
After singing with his idol, the Oslo and Kaba Bar guest Fats Waller in 1938, he led his own band, called Cecil Aagaard & His Swingsters (1939–1940), which consisted of Fred Lange-Nielsen on bass, Finn Westbye on guitar and saxophone, Ernst Aas on piano, and X Per Gregersen on bass.

Aagaard played extensively with Scandinavia's leading musicians, including the Danish musicians Kjeld Bonfils on vibraphone and Leo Mathisen on piano, as well as the Swedish musicians Gösta Törner on trumpet, Thore Jederby on bass, and Arne Hülpher on piano. After the Second World War, he toured Europe with musicians, including Rowland Greenberg and Arne Astrup.

From 1961 onward, Aagaard devoted his work to the photography business. One of his last contributions to jazz was his vocal performances with the Big Chief Jazzband (1961). His musical work can be heard on the release Portrait of a Norwegian Jazz Artist (Gemini Records, 2005), as well as Jazz in Norway, volumes 1 and 2, published by the Norwegian Jazz Archive (2001).

== Filmography ==
- 1941: Ti gutter og en gjente as a firefighter
