= Brita Bigum =

Norwegian actress (1921–1980)

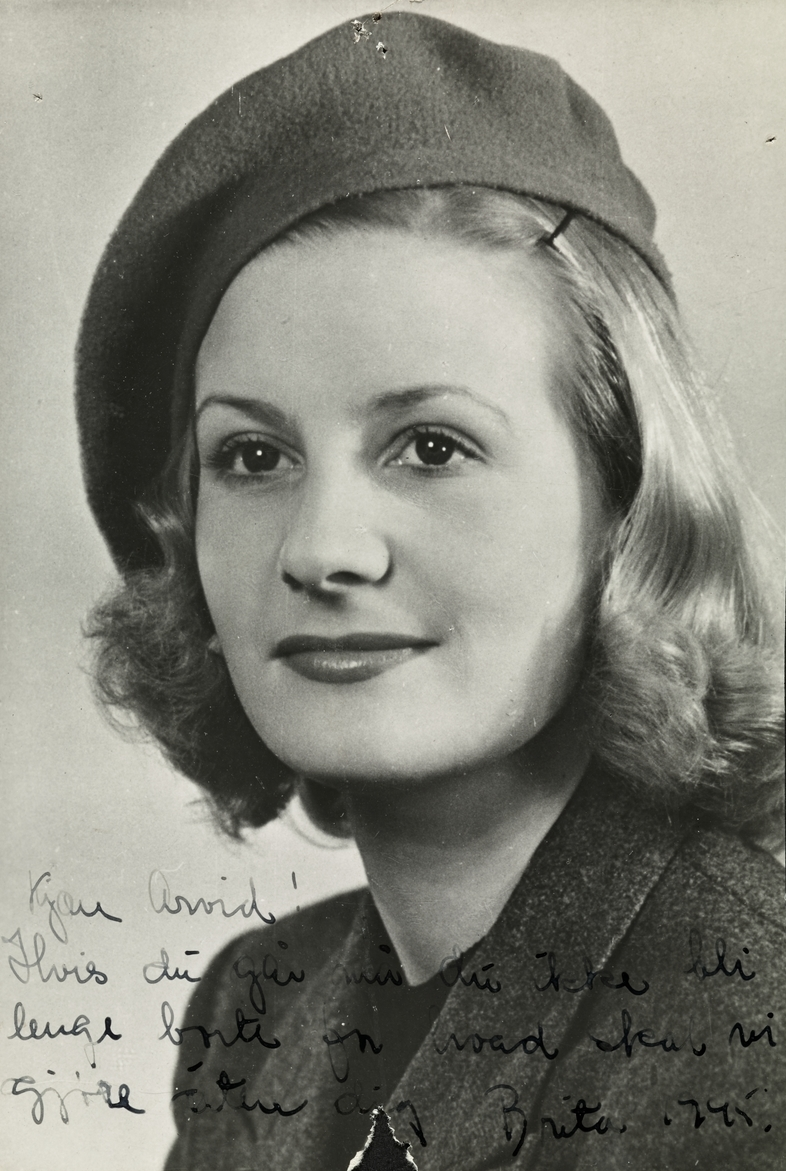
- Brita Bigum in 1945
- Born: January 25, 1921; Oslo, Norway
- Died: October 12, 1980 (aged 59)
- Resting place: Vestre gravlund
- Occupation: Actress

Brita Bigum (a.k.a. Britta Bigum and Brita Bigum Grønn, January 15, 1921 – October 12, 1980) was a Norwegian actress.

== Career ==
Bigum made her stage debut as a child in the play Per og Kari reiser til månen at the National Theatre in Oslo. She later danced at Chat Noir and the Edderkoppen Theater. Bigum made her film debut in 1940 in Tancred Ibsen's Tørres Snørtevold and appeared in a total of eight films between 1940 and 1957. She appeared as Hannchen (Norwegian: Hanna) in Eduard Künneke's operetta The Cousin from Nowhere (Norwegian title: Fetteren fra Batavia) at the Norwegian National Opera and Ballet during the 1951/52 season, and she was also active at the New Theater in 1953.

== Filmography ==
- 1940: Tørres Snørtevold as the third sales clerk
- 1946: Et spøkelse forelsker seg as Grynet
- 1949: Vi flyr på Rio as the English-speaking cabaret singer
- 1950: Døden er et kjærtegn as Brita
- 1951: Kranes konditori as Mrs. Berg
- 1951: Skadeskutt as Liv, a nurse
- 1952: Trine! as Miss Svingvoll
- 1957: Fjols til fjells as Mrs. Rosenkrantz
