= Et spøkelse forelsker seg =

- Directed by: Tancred Ibsen; Lillebil Ibsen (line producer)
- Written by: Tancred Ibsen
- Based on: A concept by Tancred Ibsen and Paul Lorck Eidem
- Produced by: Edith Carlmar; Tancred Ibsen
- Starring: Per Aabel; Wenche Foss
- Cinematography: Kåre Bergstrøm
- Edited by: Tancred Ibsen
- Music by: Jolly Kramer-Johansen
- Distributed by: Nordkap-Film A/S
- Release date: September 7, 1946
- Running time: 104 minutes
- Country: Norway
- Language: Norwegian

Et spøkelse forelsker seg (A Ghost Falls in Love) is a Norwegian adventure film and spoof comedy from 1946. The film was directed by Tancred Ibsen, who also wrote the screenplay.

== Plot ==
At the Krogeby estate, which is owned by the Vinkelkrog family, there are four ghosts. Per Aabel plays Johnny Vinkelkrog, who visits his aunt Clementine. He happens to look exactly like one of the ghosts, and intrigue ensues when the two are mistaken.

== Cast ==
- Per Aabel as Johnny Vinkelkrog / a ghost
- Guri Stormoen as Aunt Clementine
- Wenche Foss as Irene, alias Barbara Burns
- Joachim Holst-Jensen as a ghost
- Carsten Winger as a ghost
- Andreas Aabel as Fidias
- Arne Thomas Olsen as a servant
- Folkman Schaanning as the admiral
- Arvid Nilssen as a servant
- Georg Richter as Lars
- Jon Lennart Mjøen as Lauritz
- Brita Bigum as Grynet
- Anne-Lise Wang as Tyttebæret
- Esther Bretonnez (Cocca) Marstrander as Vivi
- Kari Diesen as the maid at the hotel
- Ernst Diesen as the floor attendant at the hotel
- Ragna Breda
- Humlens Danseorkester
