= Cecilia (1954 film) =

- Directed by: Solvejg Eriksen
- Written by: Solvejg Eriksen
- Starring: Anne-May Nilsen; Grethe Lill; Atle Merton; Harald Haugen; Sonny Berg
- Release date: 15 November 1954
- Running time: 85 minutes
- Country: Norway
- Language: Norwegian

Cecilia is a 1954 Norwegian drama film written and directed by Solvejg Eriksen, starring Anne-May Nilsen.

== Synopsis ==
Teenage Cecilia comes from a working class family. She lives with her mother, three brothers, and alcoholic father. Cecilia finds emotional relief and security with Tore, an older girl at her school.

== Cast ==
- Anne-May Nilsen as Cecilia
- Grethe Lill as Tore
- Atle Merton as Kasper
- Harald Haugen as Cecilia's father
- Sonny Berg as Cecilia's mother
