= Solvejg Eriksen =

Norwegian journalist and author

- Born: August 9, 1903; Karlsøy, Norway
- Died: August 10, 1993 (aged 90)
- Occupations: Writer, screenwriter, translator

Solvejg Marie Wexelsen Eriksen (August 9, 1903 – August 10, 1993) was a Norwegian journalist, author, translator, and women's rights activist.

== Life ==
Eriksen was born in Karlsøy Municipality in Troms county, Norway, the daughter of the prominent priest, politician, and Riksmål advocate Alfred Eriksen, also known as "the Karlsøy priest" (Karlsøypresten), and his wife Sigrid Marie née Wexelsen. She was the niece of the painter and film director Adam Eriksen. In the 1930s, Eriksen worked as a journalist for the newspaper Tidens Tegn, and after the Second World War she wrote for the newspaper Morgenposten. She was also a film reviewer. She wrote and translated several books from various genres, and she authored plays for the stage and screenplays. In 1951 she directed and wrote the screenplay for the film Cecilia, which involves a lesbian relationship.

Solvejg Eriksen established the Solvejg Wexelsen Eriksen Endowment for talented female writers that write about women's issues.

== Works ==
=== Books authored ===
- 1942: Den ene – og de seks (The One—And the Six)
- 1942: Tom og hunden hans (Tom and His Dog), illustrated by Georg Winther
- 1943: Jeg vil til filmen: et gløtt i ord og bilder bak kulissene i norsk film (I Want to Go to the Movies: A Glimpse in Words and Pictures behind the Scenes in Norwegian Film), published under the pseudonym Småen
- 1945: Hele Norges Lalla i tekst og bilder. Et liv i trofast tjeneste hos Thalia (All of Norway's Lalla in Text and Pictures. A Life of Faithful Service with Thalia), a biography of Lalla Carlsen
- 1946: Forfengelighetens marked. Mennesker i livets hverdag (The Vanity Market. People in Everyday Life), illustrated by Gunnar Bratlie
- 1946: En kvinne uten våpen. Skuespill i 3 akter og 7 scenebilder. Et forspill og et etterspill (A Woman without Weapons. A Play in Three Acts and Seven Scenes. A Prelude and an Epilogue)
- 1949: De stjal vårt liv (They Stole Our Lives)
- 1976: Brød i himmelen. Historien om Karlsøypresten og hans hustru. Et tidsbilde fra sosialismens første kampår og Det mannsdominerte samfunn (Bread in the Sky. The Story of the Karlsøy Priest and His Wife. A Picture of the Time of Socialism's First Battle Year and Male-Dominated Society)
- 1978: Sangen om Karina. En tidsaktuell roman om rotløs ungdom (A Song about Karina. A Timely Novel about Rootless Youth)
- 1980: Skyggedans: en familie i oppløsning (Shadow Dance: A Family in Disintegration)
- 1981: Sannheten. Fra en modig manns – sogneprest, stortingsmann, dr. phil. Alfred Eriksens – dagbok 1905 (Truth. From a Courageous Man: The Parish Priest, MP Alfred Eriksens, PhD – 1905 Diary)
- 1982: Veldedighetens ofre og andre historier om mennesker i livets hverdag. En annerledes novellesamling (Victims of Charity and Other Stories of People in Everyday Life. A Different Short Story Collection)
- 1987: Jeg vil fange en mann. Historien om en moderne Askepott (I Want to Catch a Man. The Story of a Modern Cinderella)

=== Books translated ===
- 1945: Onde øyne søker et barn (Evil Eyes Seek a Child) by Tove Ditlevsen (Danish: Man gjorde et Barn Fortræd 'You Made a Child Hurt', 1941)
- 1945: Født til gråt (Born to Cry) by Johanne Buchardt (Danish: Født til Graad, 1943)
- 1946: En gjest (A Guest) by Carl Erik Soya (Danish: En Gæst, 1941)
- 1946: Barndommens gate (Childhood Street) by Tove Ditlevsen (Danish: Barndommens gade, 1943); reissued by the Norwegian Book Club in 1978
- 1947: For barnets skyld (For the Sake of a Child) by Tove Ditlevsen (Danish: For Barnets Skyld, 1946)

=== Plays ===
- Yrkeskvinner (Business Women), staged at the National Theater in 1940
- 3 minutters stillhet (Three Minutes of Silence), staged at the Oslo New Theater

=== Films ===
- 1942: Det æ'kke te å tru (screenwriter)
- 1954: Cecilia (director and screenwriter)
