= Gryr i Norden =

- Directed by: Olav Dalgard
- Written by: Olav Dalgard
- Starring: Martin Gisti; Betzy Holter; Ragnhild Hald; Solveig Haugan; Gunvor Hall; Ragnhild Hagen; Kolbjørn Brenda; Jack Fjeldstad; Tryggve Larssen; Joachim Holst-Jensen
- Cinematography: Reidar Lund
- Edited by: Reidar Lund
- Music by: Jolly Kramer-Johansen
- Distributed by: Norsk Film A/S
- Release date: October 6, 1939
- Running time: 67 minutes
- Country: Norway
- Language: Norwegian

Gryr i Norden (Dawn in the North) is a Norwegian film from 1939 that was directed by Olav Dalgard. Gryr i Norden is the last film in the "worker trilogy." The other two films are Det drønner gjennom dalen (1938) and Lenkene brytes (1938).

The film is about the first major women's strike in Norway, the match workers' strike in Kristiania (now Oslo) in 1889. On the morning of October 23, 1889, the match workers at the Bryn and Grønvold match factories in the city went on strike. Working conditions were miserable, and most of the young women ended up with ruined health after a short period of performing the hazardous work, affected by phosphorus necrosis.

== Cast ==
- Martin Gisti as Karlsen, a stevedore
- Betzy Holter as Andrine, Karlsen's wife
- Ragnhild Hald as Halldis, a manager
- Solveig Haugan as Maja
- Gunvor Hall as Svart-Anna
- Ragnhild Hagen as Nilsine
- Kolbjørn Brenda as Adolf
- Jack Fjeldstad as Krestian
- Tryggve Larssen as Oscar Nissen, a doctor
- Joachim Holst-Jensen as Christian H.
- Ingjald Haaland as Bjørnstjerne Bjørnson
- Olav Dalgard as Hans Jæger
- Bjarne Bø as Carl Jeppesen, an editor
- Astri Steiwer as Ernanda Holst
- Hans Bille as a director
- Sigurd Magnussøn as a factory manager
- Pehr Qværnstrøm as the chairman
