= Abigael Heber Magnussøn =

Norwegian actress (1884–1968)

- Born: May 30, 1884; Skiptvet, Norway
- Died: June 30, 1968 (aged 84); Oslo, Norway
- Occupation: Actress
- Spouse: Sigurd Magnussøn

Abigael Heber Magnussøn (May 30, 1884 – June 30, 1968) was a Norwegian actress.

She was the daughter of the parish priest Andreas Emil Hansen and Anna Judith Sørensen. She married the actor Sigurd Magnussøn on August 15, 1912.

She became a university student in 1904. During the 1909/10 season, she was a student at the National Theatre in Kristiania (now Oslo). When she finished her acting education, she was first engaged with the National Theater in Bergen from 1911 to 1912, and then with the Tivoli Theater in Kristiania from 1912 to 1913. She returned to the National Theatre in Oslo from 1915 to 1919, and was then with the experimental Intimteatret theater from 1921 to 1922. After performing at Chat Noir from 1922 to 1924, she moved to Trondheim and was engaged with the Trondhein National Theater from 1924 to 1925. She performed at various theaters after that.

Abigael Magnussøn also appeared in two films.

== Filmography ==
- 1937: Fant as Johanne's mother
- 1938: Lenkene brytes
