= Vi bygger landet =

- Directed by: Olav Dalgard
- Written by: Olav Dalgard
- Starring: Georg Løkkeberg; Rønnaug Alten; Oscar Egede-Nissen
- Cinematography: Reidar Lund
- Music by: Jolly Kramer-Johansen
- Distributed by: Norsk Lydfilm A/S
- Release date: September 14, 1936
- Running time: 52 minutes
- Country: Norway
- Language: Norwegian

Vi bygger landet (We Build the Country) is a Norwegian film from 1936, directed by Olav Dalgard. The film is a so-called "workers' film" that was created on behalf of the Workers' Educational Association (Arbeidernes Opplysningsforbund, AOF) to motivate voters in the cities to vote for the Labor Party in the parliamentary elections in 1936. Together with Norge for folket (1936) and By og land hand i hand (1937), it is part of the so-called workers' film trilogy.

== Cast ==
- Georg Løkkeberg as Georg Larsen
- Rønnaug Alten as Tora Knudsen
- Oscar Egede-Nissen as Ole Larsen
- Fredrik Barth as Bredesen Jr.
- Jens Holstad as Larsen
- Tryggve Larssen as Svart-Pelle
- Toralf Sandø as Knudsen, a construction worker
- Eva Steen as Mrs. Larsen
