= Tryggve Larssen =

Norwegian actor (1887–1967)

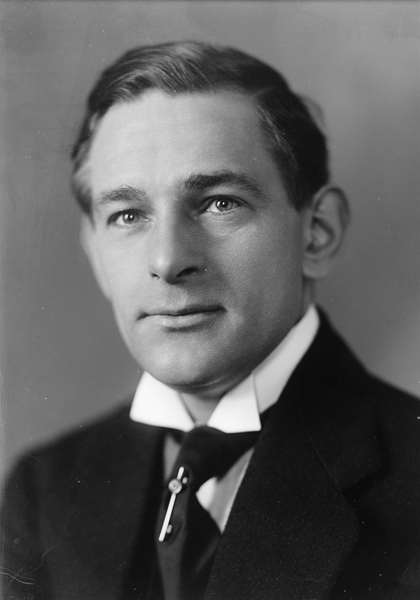
- Born: October 3, 1887; Bergen, Norway
- Died: June 28, 1967 (aged 79); Oslo, Norway
- Occupation: Actor
- Spouse(s): Julie Marie "Veslemøy" Ihlen Sopp; Ruth Vindenes

Tryggve Larssen (October 3, 1887 – June 28, 1967) was a Norwegian actor.

Larssen debuted as an actor in Ludovica Levy's touring theatre in 1911, after which he was engaged with the National Theater in Bergen and the Norwegian Theater in Oslo. He was then engaged with the National Theater in Oslo from 1921 to 1961. As an actor specializing in comic roles, Larssen made a name for himself in annual Christmas performances, including as the first-ever Santa Claus in the play Reisen til Julestjernen (Journey to the Christmas Star) in 1924. He also played supporting roles in numerous plays by Ludvig Holberg, Henrik Ibsen, and William Shakespeare.

Larssen performed on stage until well into retirement age, and his last theater role was as Lavrans in the play Guds Gjøglere by Odd Eidem.

Larssen appeared in a number of Norwegian and Swedish films. He made his debut in the silent film era, and his last role in Norwegian film was in Storfolk og småfolk in 1951.

== Filmography ==
- 1927: Troll-elgen
- 1928: Viddenes folk
- 1929: Laila
- 1930: Eskimo
- 1935: Samhold må til
- 1936: Norge for folket
- 1936: Vi bygger landet
- 1937: By og land hand i hand
- 1938: Det drønner gjennom dalen
- 1938: Eli Sjursdotter
- 1938: Lenkene brytes
- 1939: De vergeløse
- 1939: Gryr i Norden
- 1940: Frestelse (Swedish)
- 1940: Mannen som alle ville myrde (Swedish)
- 1940: Tante Pose
- 1940: Tørres Snørtevold
- 1941: Kjærlighet og vennskap
- 1941: Den forsvundne pølsemakere
- 1942: Det æ'kke te å tru
- 1942: Trysil-Knut
- 1943: Den nye lægen
- 1943: Sangen til livet
- 1944: Villmarkens lov
- 1949: Aldri mer!
- 1951: Storfolk og småfolk
- 1953: No Man's Woman (Swedish)
