= Farende folk =

1922 film

- Directed by: Amund Rydland
- Written by: Amund Rydland; Martin Gisti
- Based on: Severin Lieblein's novel Den sidste av sin slegt: et blad av Jonas Værns ungdomskrønike
- Starring: Amund Rydland; Arna Fahlstrøm; Lars Tvinde; Martin Gisti; Agnes Mowinckel
- Cinematography: Arthur Thorell
- Edited by: Amund Rydland
- Distributed by: Kommunenes Filmcentral A/S
- Release date: 1922
- Running time: 84 minutes
- Country: Norway
- Language: Norwegian

Farende folk (Traveling Folk) is a Norwegian silent film from 1922, directed by Amund Rydland. The screenplay was written by Rydland and the actor Martin Gisti, and it is based on Severin Lieblein's 1910 novel Den sidste av sin slegt: et blad av Jonas Værns ungdomskrønike.

The film is available for free at the website of the National Library of Norway.

== Cast ==
- Amund Rydland as Ahti
- Arna Fahlstrøm as Ahti's girlfriend
- Lars Tvinde as Klemet the Gypsy chief
- Martin Gisti as Mjøltraavaren
- Agnes Mowinckel as Birgitte Værn
- Nils Hald as Jonas Værn
- Didi Holtermann as Veronika
- Magnus Hamlander as Reinert
- Karen Rasmussen as Varvara, a Gypsy
- Aksel Opsann as Mr. Wilson
- P. A. Grindalen as the bailiff
- Helga Rydland as Signekjerringa (the Sibyl)
- Ragnhild Hald as a young woman (not credited)
- Tore Segelcke as a young girl (not credited)
