= Lenkene brytes =

- Directed by: Olav Dalgard; Fredrik Barth
- Written by: Sigurd Evensmo
- Starring: Tryggve Larssen; Abigael Heber Magnussøn; Jack Fjeldstad; Mai Lindegård; Ebba Toje
- Cinematography: Reidar Lund
- Music by: Jolly Kramer-Johansen
- Distributed by: Norsk Film A/S
- Release date: 1938
- Running time: 60 minutes
- Country: Norway
- Language: Norwegian

Lenkene brytes (The Chains Are Broken) is a Norwegian film from 1938 that was directed by Olav Dalgard and Fredrik Barth. Lenkene brytes is the second film in the "worker trilogy." The other two films are Det drønner gjennom dalen (1938) and Gryr i Norden (1939).

The film addresses the issue of alcohol abuse, which also impacted the organized labor movement. It is about life in working-class youth groups, the work of the abstinence movement, and friendship, unity, and love between young people. Sigurd Evensmo wrote the script, and the film was created as a feature film for young people.

== Cast ==
- Tryggve Larssen as Heien
- Jack Fjeldstad as Jan Heien
- Mai Lindegard as Gerda Bratt
- Ebba Toje as Mrs. Bratt
- Kolbjørn Brenda as the chairman
- Åge Pedersen as Sverre
- Pehr Qværnstrøm as Ludvigsen
- Helge Essmar as a bootlegger
- Abigael Heber Magnussøn
