= David Knudsen =

Norwegian actor (1875–1952)

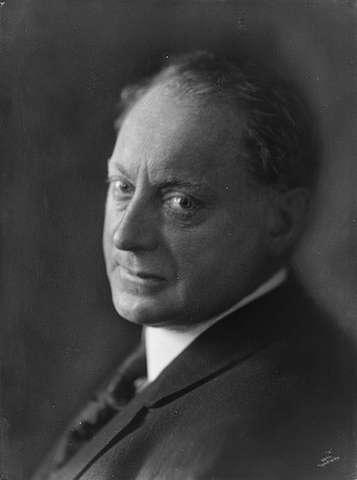
- Born: 8 August 1875; Christiania, Norway
- Died: 3 July 1952 (aged 76); Oslo, Norway
- Occupation: Actor
- Awards: Order of St. Olav; King's Medal of Merit in gold

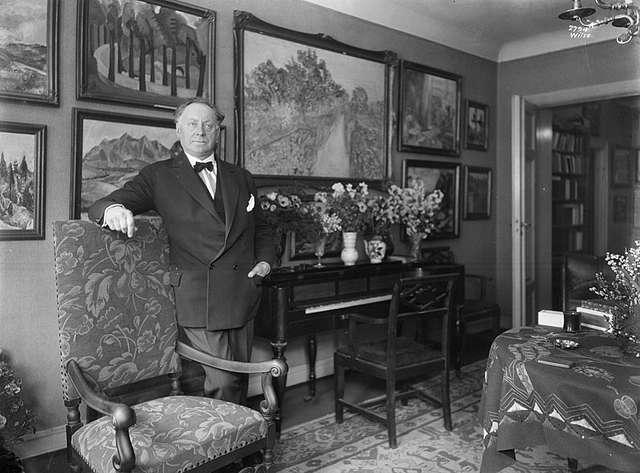
Knudsen in 1927

David Knudsen (8 August 1875 – 3 July 1952) was a Norwegian actor. He made his stage debut on Den Nationale Scene in 1902, and played for the National Theatre from 1911 to 1940.

He made his film debut in 1925 in Himmeluret, and later participated in several films, including Kampen om tungtvannet from 1948.

He was decorated Knight, First Class of the Royal Norwegian Order of St. Olav in 1945.

== External lminks ==
- David Knudsen at IMDb
