= Betzy Holter =

Norwegian actress (1893–1979)

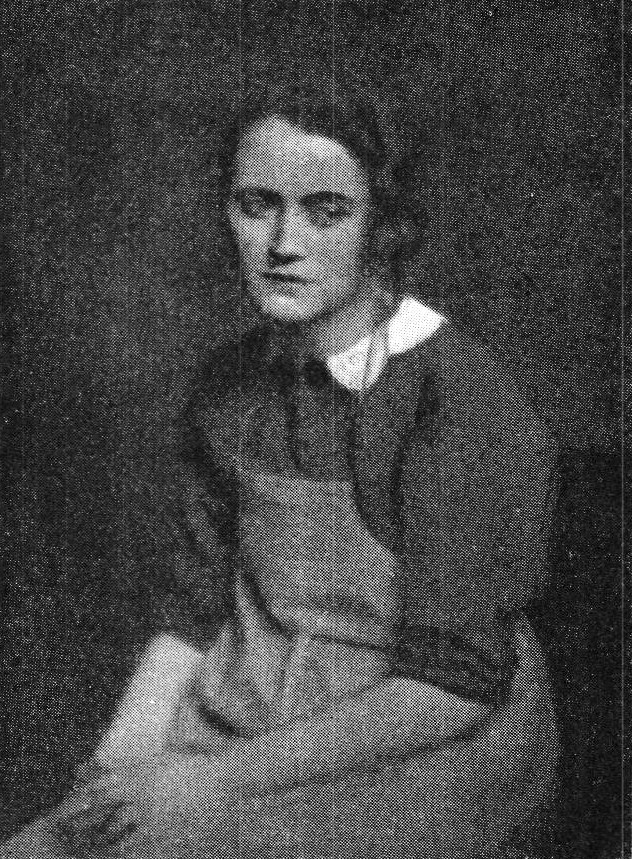
- Born: May 29, 1893; Kolvereid, Norway
- Died: November 9, 1979 (aged 86); Oslo, Norway
- Occupation: Actress
- Spouse: Karl Holter

Betzy Marie Holter (née Jordal; May 28, 1893 – November 9, 1979) was a Norwegian actress.

Holter made her stage debut in 1913 as Randi in Olav Hoprekstad's Bjørnefjell, one of the opening performances at the Norwegian Theater. She had a number of major roles at the theater in the years that followed, such as Milja in Oskar Braaten's Ungen and Klara Gullborg in a stage version of Selma Lagerlöf's Kejsarn av Portugallien. Between her successes in the capital, she also made some guest appearances in Trondheim and Stavanger.

From 1924 onward, Holter was engaged with the National Theater and played realistic figures from the Oslo's East End such as Alvilde in Den store barnedåpen and a street girl in Sigurd Christiansen's play Edmund Jahr. Her last role at the National Theater was Hedvig in The Wild Duck in 1928. Then she returned to the Norwegian Theater, where she remained until the spring of 1930. After five years away from the stage, she performed again from 1935 to 1941/42 as a stage actress in Oslo. She appeared on NRK's Radio Theater in the 1930s. In 1947, Holter returned to the stage, when she was engaged at the Rogaland Theater. Here she was an important actress in supporting roles for many years, and she also directed performances.

Holter also wrote the radio play Kamerat (1932).

Betzy Holter was married to her fellow actor Karl Holter (1885–1963). However, they divorced in the mid-1930s and had had no contact with each other thereafter. Betzy Holter starred in the 1943 propaganda film Unge viljer, but three of her children took an active part in the Norwegian resistance movement. Two of them (two daughters) later served in the Norwegian Navy in England from 1942 onward, after about a year in Stockholm. Holter's only son, Tord Holter, was wounded by the Germans in battle at Kongsvinger Fortress in April 1940, and he never fully recovered.

== Filmography ==
- 1912: Anny – en gatepiges roman
- 1926: Baldevins bryllup as Madam Salvesen
- 1939: Gryr i Norden as Andrine, Karlsen's wife
- 1943: Unge viljer as Mrs. West
- 1952: Andrine og Kjell as Mrs. Bergan, Kjell's mother
- 1958: Ut av mørket
