= Anny – Story of a Prostitute =

- Directed by: Adam Eriksen
- Written by: Adam Eriksen
- Starring: Julie Jansen-Fuhr; Johan Andersson
- Release date: 9 November 1912
- Running time: 68 minutes
- Country: Norway
- Language: Norwegian

Anny – Story of a Prostitute (Norwegian: Anny – en gatepiges roman) is a 1912 Norwegian drama film written and directed by Adam Eriksen, starring Julie Jansen-Fuhr and Johan Andersson.

== Plot ==
Factory girl Anny (Jansen-Fuhr) gets involved with an older merchant, and then develops a plot to defraud him with his son. The two are caught and decide to escape to America, but the son then tries to take his own life with poison. He survives and is forgiven, while Anny descends further into poverty and desperation.

== Cast ==
- Julie Jansen-Fuhr as Anny
- Johan Andersson as Willmann, the merchant
- Gunlaug Lund as the merchant's wife
- Waldermar Zwinge as the merchant's son
- Eugène Bech as Snapp, the cashier
- Aagot Gunderson as Anny's friend
- Fru Zwinge as Anny's mother
- Ole Brun Lie as Anny's father
- Kolbjørn Skjefstad as the doctor / the bookkeeper) / a store customer
- Betzy Holter
- Jens Holstad
