= Alf Rød =

Norwegian screenwriter, playwright, and film director (1894–1969)

- Born: February 19, 1894; Fredrikshald (now Halden), Norway
- Died: December 18, 1969 (aged 75)
- Resting place: Vestre gravlund, Oslo, Norway
- Occupations: Screenwriter, playwright, and film director
- Relatives: Einar Rød

Alf Rød (February 19, 1894 – December 18, 1969) was a Norwegian screenwriter, playwright, and film director. He was the brother of the actor Einar Rød.

Rød's main activity was as a screenwriter. He debuted as a screenwriter in 1926 with Baldevins bryllup, based on a play by Vilhelm Krag. Rød wrote a total of seven film scripts between 1926 and 1941. Together with Thorleif Reiss, he also wrote the play Snehvit (Snow White), which was staged at the National Theater in Oslo in 1929.

In 1936, Rød directed his first and only feature film, Dyrk jorden! In 1938, he directed the short film Bygg din framtid! (Build Your Future!), a documentary for the Norwegian Cooperative Association. Rød wrote the lyrics to the song "Fanteguttens lengsel" (The Gypsy's Yearning) for the 1932 film Fantegutten, and song lyrics for the 1950 film Marianne på sykehus.

== Filmography ==
=== As screenwriter ===
- 1926: Baldevins bryllup
- 1927: Madame besøker Oslo
- 1927: Troll-elgen
- 1928: Bergenstoget plyndret i natt
- 1932: Prinsessen som ingen kunne målbinde
- 1936: Dyrk jorden!
- 1941: Kjærlighet og vennskap

=== As director ===
- 1936: Dyrk jorden!
- 1938: Bygg din framtid!
