= Sinners in Summertime =

1934 film

- Directed by: Einar Sissener
- Written by: Sigurd Hoel (novel)
- Starring: Einar Sissener; Tore Segelcke; Hans Jacob Nilsen
- Cinematography: Gunnar Nilsen-Vig
- Music by: Kristian Hauger
- Production company: Norsk Talefilm-produksjon
- Release date: 15 February 1934
- Running time: 103 minutes
- Country: Norway
- Language: Norwegian

Sinners in Summertime (Norwegian: Syndere i sommersol) is a 1934 Norwegian drama film directed by and starring Einar Sissener. It also featured Tore Segelcke and Hans Jacob Nilsen and marked the debut of the future star of German cinema Kirsten Heiberg. It is based on the 1927 novel of the same title by Sigurd Hoel.

== Cast ==
- Einar Sissener as Johan
- Tore Segelcke as Erna
- Hans Jacob Nilsen as Alf
- Hjørdis Bjarke as Sigrid
- Georg Løkkeberg as Erik
- Gøril Havrevold as Randi
- Kirsten Heiberg as Evelyn
- Andreas Bjarke as Fredrik
- Lasse Segelcke as Thomas F. Jensen
- Leif Omdal as Peter Møllendorff
- Eva Steen as En pasient

== Bibliography ==
- Ellen Rees. Cabins in Modern Norwegian Literature: Negotiating Place and Identity. Rowman & Littlefield, 2014.
