= Johan Hauge =

Norwegian actor and theater director (1879–1967)

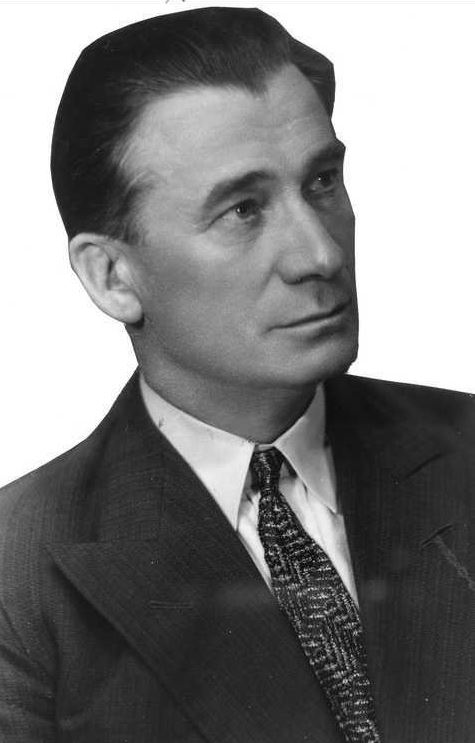
- Born: February 8, 1879; Sokndal, Norway
- Died: May 6, 1967 (aged 88); Oslo, Norway
- Occupations: Actor and theater director

Johan Kristian Hauge (February 8, 1879 – May 6, 1967) was a Norwegian actor and theater director.

== Family ==
Hauge was born in Sokndal Municipality as the son of the farmer Ingebrikt Olsen (1833–1914) and Elisabeth Christiansen Bøe. In 1925 he married Gjertrude Lofthus Børseth.

== Career ==
After graduating from the Trondheim Technical Institute in 1898, Hauge was employed in 1900 at the Second Theater in Oslo, where he made his debut as Olav Tryggvason in a production of Haakon Jarl. The theater went bankrupt, and Hauge was then associated with the National Theater in Bergen from 1901 to 1924, and there he created a number of role interpretations that became very well known in their time. Then followed a year where he was the last manager of the Trondheim National Theater, which closed in 1926. From 1928 to 1932 he was at the New Theater in Oslo. Later he was employed at the National Theatre in Oslo.

During the Second World War, Hauge became a member of Nasjonal Samling (NS) and the Norwegian Cultural Assembly. He also appeared in the NS propaganda film Unge viljer from 1943. Hauge was sentenced to prison for two and a half years and loss of rights for 10 years during the legal purge in Norway after the war. The verdict based on his membership in the NS and the Cultural Assembly.

== Filmography ==
- 1939: Valfångare as the priest
- 1939: Gjest Baardsen as the judge
- 1941: Gullfjellet as the magistrate
- 1943: Unge viljer as West, a company director
