= Kjærlighet og vennskap =

- Directed by: Leif Sinding
- Written by: Gustav Berg-Jæger; Gunnar Neels-Hansson; Alf Rød
- Based on: Peter Egge's play Kjærlighet og vennskap
- Produced by: Leif Sinding
- Starring: Sonja Wigert; Georg Løkkeberg; Per Aabel; Rønnaug Alten; Tryggve Larssen; Kiste Lund; Thomas Thomassen; Henrik Børseth; Eugène Bech; Sophus Dahl; Ulf Selmer; Turid Haaland; Sigurd Magnussøn; Jens Holstad; Bjarne Bø; Thorleif Mikkelsen; Leif Omdal; Frank Robert; Gerd Kværnberg
- Cinematography: Per G. Jonson
- Edited by: Per G. Jonson; Leif Sinding
- Music by: Jolly Kramer-Johansen
- Distributed by: Merkur Film
- Release date: 1941
- Running time: 98 minutes
- Country: Norway
- Language: Norwegian

Kjærlighet og vennskap is a 1941 Norwegian film directed by Leif Sinding and starring Sonja Wigert, Georg Løkkeberg, and Per Aabel. The film was produced at A/S Merkur-Film and features music by Jolly Kramer-Johansen.

== Cast ==
- Sonja Wigert as Eva Jespersen
- Georg Løkkeberg as Harald Jespersen
- Per Aabel as Anton Schack
- Rønnaug Alten as Ragna
- Tryggve Larssen as Onkel Johan
- Kiste Lund as Else Simonsen
- Thomas Thomassen as G. O. Hansen
- Henrik Børseth as agent Kraakstad
- Eugène Bech as Dr. Hallander
- Sophus Dahl as Erik Lind
- Ulf Selmer as Per Arnesen, barrister
- Turid Haaland as Hulda
- Jens Holstad as a caretaker
