= Ingolf Schanche =

Norwegian actor and theatre director (1877–1954)

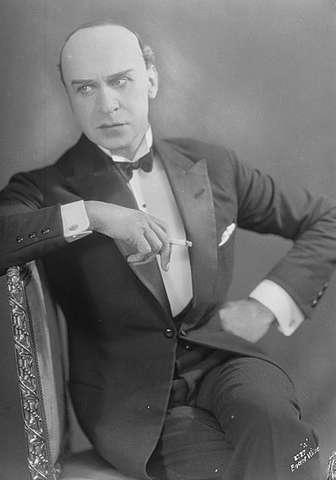
- Schanche, 1924
- Born: 13 June 1877
- Died: 15 April 1954 (aged 76)
- Spouse(s): Ragnhild Fredriksen

Ingolf Findregaard Schanche (13 June 1877 – 15 April 1954) was a Norwegian actor and theatre director. He spent most of his career at Nationaltheatret in Oslo, and was also the first artistic director at Det Nye Teater.

== Personal life ==
Schanche was born in Bergen as the son of shipmaster Christian Fredrik Grøner Schanche (1847–1918) and Ida P. M. Larsen (1848–1896). He was a distant relative of postmaster Jens Schanche and Herman Garmann Schanche. He married the actress Ragnhild Fredriksen (1882–1963) in July 1905, making him the brother-in-law of the actress Hilda Fredriksen.

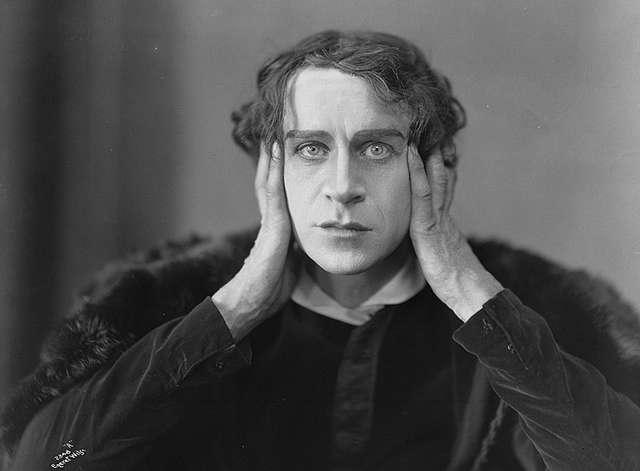
Ingolf Schanche in the role as Hamlet

== Career ==
He made his stage début in 1897 at the Bergen theatre Den Nationale Scene in Peter Egge's play Stridsmænd, and acted at Den Nationale Scene for two seasons. He joined Ludovica Levy and Dore Lavik at their theatre Sekondteatret in Oslo from the start in 1899. One year later he played at Centralteatret and then at Fahlstrøms Teater. In 1905 he started working at Nationaltheatret. He stayed at Nationaltheatret until 1928, when he was actor and manager for Det Nye Teater, which opened in 1929. From 1931 to 1942 he again played at Nationaltheatret. Schanche also appeared in a number of films beginning with the 1913 Carl Gandrup directed silent film short Under Kniven. His last film appearance was in the 1939 Sigurd Wallén directed Swedish language drama Mot nya tider.

During the 1920s he often made guest performances at theatres in Helsinki, Stockholm and Copenhagen. He played comedy roles such as "Count Danilo" in Lehár's The Merry Widow, Ibsen characters such as "Bishop Nikolas" and "Gregers Werle", the Bjørnson character "Paul Lange", and "Fedja" in Tolstoy's play The Living Corpse. The height of his career was "Hamlet" in Shakespeare's tragedy, a role he played first time in 1921.

Schanche was an honorary member of the Swedish Union for Theatre, Artists and Media. He was a Knight of the Swedish Order of Vasa, and was decorated Knight, First Class of the Royal Norwegian Order of St. Olav in 1937.
