= Leif Longum =

Norwegian essayist and literary researcher

- Born: 19 November 1927; Oslo, Norway
- Died: 5 May 1997 (aged 69)
- Occupations: Essayist and literary researcher

Leif Longum (19 November 1927 – 5 May 1997) was a Norwegian essayist and literary researcher. He was born in Oslo. He was assigned to the Nansen Academy from 1960 to 1972, and the University of Bergen from 1972 to 1995; from 1992 as a professor. He published the textbook Å lese skuespill in 1976. His principal work is an analysis of the "cultural radicalism" in Norway in the interwar years, with particular focus on the troika Sigurd Hoel, Helge Krog and Arnulf Øverland. He published the essay collection Å krysse sine spor in 1995, while the collection På fallrepet was published posthumously in 1998.
