= Kirsten Heiberg =

Norwegian actress (1907–1976)

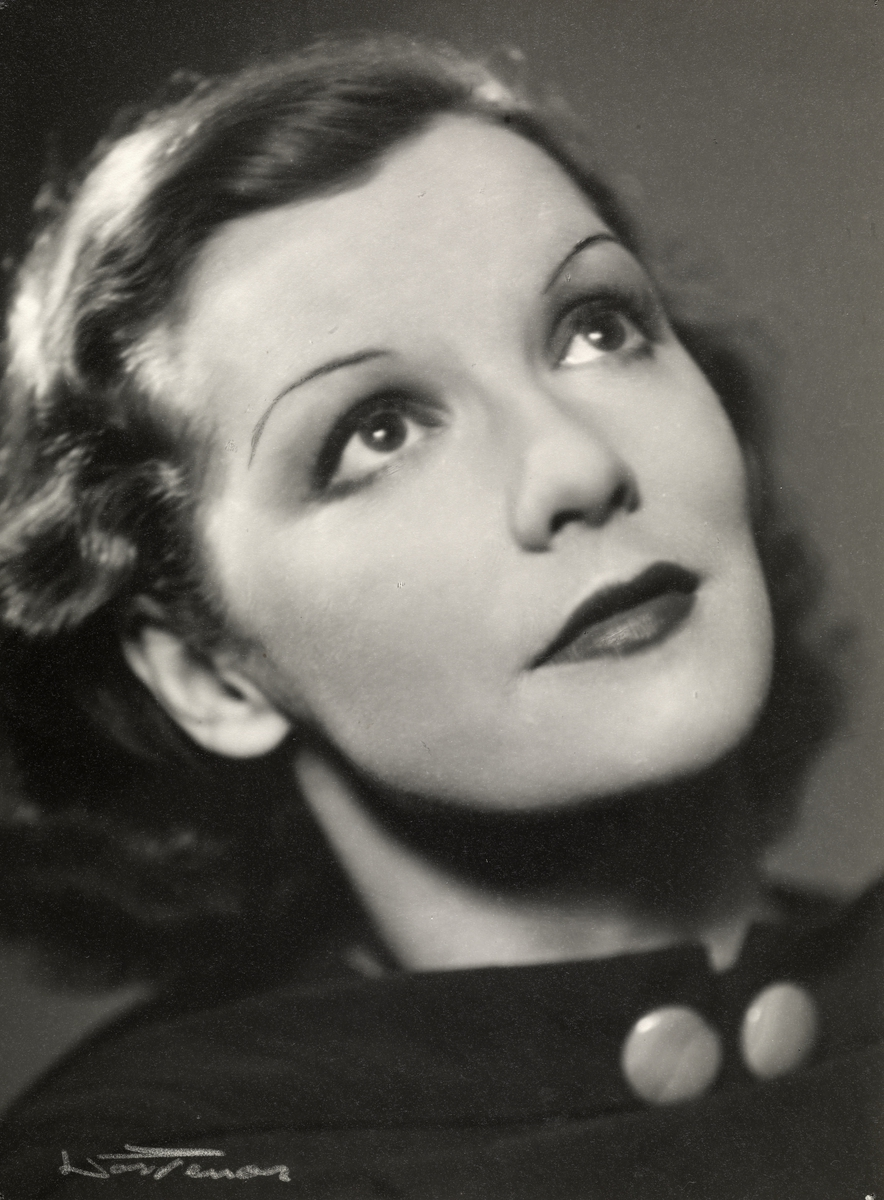
- Kirsten Heiberg, between 1930–1935
- Born: 25 April 1907; Kragerø, Telemark, Norway
- Died: 2 March 1976 (aged 68); Oslo, Norway
- Years active: 1929–1970s
- Spouse: Franz Grothe (1938-1951)
- Parents: Sverre Heiberg (father); Johanne Marie Schweigaard (mother)
- Relatives: Else Heiberg (sister)

Kirsten Heiberg (25 April 1907 – 2 March 1976) was a Norwegian/German actress and singer who had a major film career in Germany between 1938 and 1954. She reached the peak of her career in 1942–43, performing in Joseph Goebbels' version of Titanic. After the war she was given a two-year ban by the Allies due to her role in the Nazi propaganda. In Norway she was never punished, as she was a German citizen.

== Biography ==
Heiberg grew up in the towns Kragerø, Kongsberg and Oslo, and studied in Lausanne, Dijon and Paris. Later, she studied English in Oxford, England.

She made her debut at Den Nationale Scene in Bergen in 1929, and in the 1930s at the Carl Johan Theater and Scala Revyteater in Oslo. Kirsten Heiberg also performed in several Norwegian and Swedish films in the early 1930s and had her breakthrough in the comedy Han, hon och pengarna ("He, she and the money") in 1936. After guest appearances in the operetta revue "Pam-Pam" at Theater an der Wien in 1937, she began a career in Germany both as a film actress and recording artist. She became a significant actress in the German film industry and The Third Reich's femme fatale – the "new Marlene Dietrich". In Vienna, she met the composer Franz Grothe, who was a member of the Nazi Party They married in Oslo in 1938 and moved to Berlin.

Kirsten Heiberg made her German film debut in Curt Goetz' Napoleon Is to Blame for Everything, and a row of films followed, among others: Frauen für Golden Hill (1938), Achtung! Feind hört mit! (1940) and Titanic (1942–43).

Kirsten Heiberg was also very active in the German welfare for the troops (Truppenbetreuung), traveling around the country, also abroad, singing for the German soldiers.

Kirsten Heiberg claimed after the war that she was blacklisted by German Nazi authorities for not joining the Nazi Party, and that she spent two years without work. However, there is no evidence in German archive sources to prove this. On the contrary, Kirsten Heiberg's name can be found on the salary lists of the German film industry every year from April 1940, when she got her Reichsfilmkammer membership, until 1945. Kirsten Heiberg was also, since April 1939, a member of the Kameradschaft der deutschen Künstler, an organisation for artists founded by the SS member Benno von Arent in 1933.

Kirsten Heiberg continued to act in the German Nazi propaganda until she left Berlin with her husband Franz Grothe at the end of April 1945.

In 1946 she dubbed Marlene Dietrich in the German version of the French picture Martin Roumaniac.

She was the sister of actress Else Heiberg.

=== After World War II ===
Back in Norway after the war, she met great difficulty in finding roles due to her time in Germany during the war. However, she was not arrested by the Norwegians since she still was a German citizen, her marriage to Franz Grothe having not been formally annulled. In Germany, she was seen in four films after the war. In Trondheim, she got an engagement as a resident at Trøndelag Teater 1952–60, acting in operettas, comedies, and serious classics and modern dramas. She also sporadically appeared at the Oslo scene in the 1960s and 70s, but she faced a boycott in Oslo, and never again was given a steady job at any theatre or film company.

== Legacy ==
On 15 August 2008, the premiere was held of the monologue "Glamour for Goebbels" at Haugesund Teater as part of the film festival. Elsa Aanensen performed as Kirsten Heiberg. Øyvind Osmo Eriksen was the instructor for the performance, and Halvor Lillesund was pianist. On 14 May 2009, the play moved to Det Åpne Teater in Oslo.

Film clips and music were integrated in the monologue. It contained film of Aanensen as Kirsten Heiberg, but no clips from her old films were used. "Glamour for Goebbels" mostly dealt with Heiberg's time in Berlin, where she lived a glamorous lifestyle.

In November 2014, Bjørn-Erik Hanssen's historical biography Glamour for Goebbels was published by Aschehoug Publishing House, Oslo, based on four years of studies in Norwegian and German archives.

== Filmography and discography ==
=== Filmography ===
- Sinners in Summertime (1934) – Evelyn
- Song of Rondane (1934) – Greta
- Du har lovet mig en kone! (1935) – Vivi Linder
- He, She and the Money (1936) – Margarita Perkins
- Russian Flu (1937) – Nadja Ivanovna
- Oh, Such a Night! (1937) – Lola Kasaell
- Secret Code LB 17 (1938) – Singer
- Napoleon Is to Blame for Everything (1938) – Fifi
- Women for Golden Hill (1938) – Violet
- Der Trichter. (Nr. III) (1939, Short)
- Alarm at Station III (1939) – Kaja, Chansonette
- Der singende Tor/aka Mord um Mitternacht (Italian title: La casa lontana) (1939) – Sylvia Franchetti
- La casa lontana (1939) – Maria Franchetti
- Achtung! Feind hört mit! (1940) – Lilly, Modesalon-Inhaberin
- Counterfeiters (1940) – Juliette Balouet, Betrügerin
- Love Premiere (1943) – Vera Warden, Operettensängerin
- Titanic (1943) – Gloria
- The Golden Spider (1943) – Lisaweta, Agentin, alias Agnes Jordan, Kabarettsängerin
- The Black Robe (1944) – Irene Friedberg
- Philharmonic (1944) – Heddy Lindt
- Axel an der Himmelstür (1944)
- Eines Tages (1945) – Edith Torburg
- Rätsel der Nacht (1945) – Gabrielle
- Amico (1949) – Didi Roesch, Barbesitzerin
- Harbour Melody (1950) – Marietta
- Furioso (1950) – Isa Soldin, seine Frau
- Bei Dir war es immer so schön (1954) – Kabarettstar
- Broder Gabrielsen (1966) – Fallen kvinne
- Eiszeit (1975) – (final film role)

=== Discography ===
- Dixiana – performed at Stockholm Odeon August 1932. Not released.
- Är det sån't man kallar kärlek
- Min cigarett og jeg – Scala revue "Vi har den ære". Performed in Oslo for His Master's Voice 1935
- Vi selv og våre hjem – See above
- Abends am Klavier, 1937 (Duet with Fritz Spielmann)
- Unsichtbare Tränen, 1937
- Wie der Schnee vom vergangenen Jahr, 1937
- Frag nicht nach der Vergangenheit, 1937
- Warum hat der Napoleon, 1938
- Ich bin wie ich bin, 1938
- Schließ deine Augen und träume
- Zeig der Welt nicht dein Herz,1938
- Auf den Flügeln bunter Träume, 1938
- Ganz leise, 1938
- Mein lieber Freund, sie sind heut eingeladen, 1939
- Ja und nein, 1939
- Für eine Stunde Leidenschaft, 1942
- Serenade vom Rattenfänger, 1942
- Komm, Zauber der Nacht , 1943
- Ich bin heut frei, meine Herren, 1943
- Mein Herz liegt gefangen in deiner Hand, 1943
- Ich steh' allein', 1945
- Es bleibt doch unter uns, 1945
- Didi Song (= Halunkenpostille), 1949
- Das Lied von den ausfahrenden Schiffen, 1949
- Die Moritat vom verlorenen Sohn, 1949
- Valse bleue in Moll, 1950
- Komm, Zigeuner nimm die Geige, 1950
- So oder so ist das Leben, 1954

== Literature ==
Glamour for Goebbels (2014) by Bjørn-Erik Hanssen
