= Eva Steen =

Norwegian actress (1889–1973)

- Born: November 12, 1889; Strømsø, Norway
- Died: March 30, 1973 (aged 83); Oslo, Norway
- Resting place: Cemetery of Our Saviour
- Occupation: Actress

Eva Steen (née Eva Oscarsdatter Jacobsen, November 12, 1889 – March 30, 1973) was a Norwegian actress.

Steen was born in Strømsø. She was the daughter of Oscar Jacobsen and Laura Sofie Fredrikke Jacobsen (née Dahl).

== Filmography ==
- 1933: Vi som går kjøkkenveien as Aunt Alexandra
- 1934: Sangen om Rondane as the aunt
- 1934: Syndere i sommersol as a patient
- 1936: Vi bygger landet as Mrs. Larsen
- 1937: Bra mennesker as Mrs. Haldorsen
- 1937: By og land hand i hand as Katrina Larsen
- 1939: Familien på Borgan as the wholesaler's wife
- 1941: Den forsvundne pølsemaker as Mrs. H. Brand
- 1949: Gategutter
- 1951: Kranes konditori as Mrs. Buck
- 1953: Brudebuketten as the lady in the lingerie shop
- 1957: Stevnemøte med glemte år
- 1957: The Violators as Jean

== Theater roles (selected) ==
- 1938: Non ti conosco più (Norwegian title: Jeg kjenner deg ikke) by Aldo De Benedetti at the Oslo New Theater as Rosita Lawrence
- 1946: Arsenic and Old Lace (Norwegian title: Arsenikk og gamle kniplinger) by Joseph Kesselring at the Oslo New Theater as an old woman
