= Dyrk jorden! =

1936 film

- Directed by: Alf Rød
- Written by: Alf Rød
- Starring: Reidar Borgeli; Ragna Breda
- Cinematography: Paul Berge
- Distributed by: Landbruksdepartementets film- og billedkontor
- Release date: February 12, 1937
- Running time: 75 minutes
- Country: Norway
- Language: Norwegian

Dyrk jorden! (Cultivate the Soil!) is a Norwegian black-and-white feature film from 1936 written and directed by Alf Rød. It was his only feature film. It was a propaganda film produced for the Norwegian Grain Corporation (Norwegian: Statens Kornforretning).

== Cast ==
- Reidar Borgeli as Trond
- Ragna Breda as Guri
- Arnfinn Brodersen as Bjarne Engset, Ola's son
- Nils Hald as Hjalmar
- Julie Lampe as Øverli
- Gerd Løwlie as Åse, a servant girl
- Einar Vaage as Ola Engset
