= Ragna Breda =

Norwegian actress, author, and translator (1905–1997)

- Born: October 12, 1905; Horten, Norway
- Died: July 12, 1997 (aged 91); Fredrikstad, Norway
- Resting place: East Fredrikstad Cemetery
- Occupation(s): Actress, author, translator

Ragna Breda (née Ragna Elisabeth Lindhjem, married name Ragna Bramer, October 12, 1905 – July 12, 1997) was a Norwegian actress as well as an author and translator of children's books.

== Personal life ==
Ragna Breda was born in Horten, Norway. She married Trygve Gram Bramer (1908–2006) in 1933. She died in Fredrikstad, Norway.

== Filmography ==
- 1931: Halvvägs till himlen (Swedish)
- 1933: Vi som går kjøkkenveien as Olga, Beck's servant girl
- 1936: Dyrk jorden! as Guri
- 1939: En enda natt (Swedish) as Mrs. Krogh (uncredited)
- 1940: Tante Pose as Marianne
- 1944: Vigdis as Nordby's sister
- 1946: Et spøkelse forelsker seg
