= Ti gutter og en gjente =

- Directed by: Alexey Zaitzow
- Written by: Alexey Zaitzow; Arne Stig (concept)
- Produced by: Lauritz Lied
- Starring: Else Budde; Arol Selmer; Knut Tønnessen
- Cinematography: Ottar Gladtvet; Sixten Andersen (outdoor scenes)
- Edited by: Reidar Lund
- Music by: Thorvald Lammers Jr.
- Distributed by: Efi produksjon A/S
- Release date: August 28, 1944
- Running time: 61 minutes
- Country: Norway
- Language: Norwegian

Ti gutter og en gjente (Ten Boys and a Girl) is a Norwegian children's film from 1944 directed by Alexey Zaitzow.

== Plot ==
The film is about ten boys that try to help a street musician collect money for an accordion. The film is considered one of Norway's first children's films.

== Cast ==
- Else Budde as Vivian
- Arol Selmer as Markus, a street musician
- Cecil Aagaard as a firefighter
- Snefrid Aukland as a hoarder
- Øistein Fredstie as Tobben
- Per Hagelsten as Finge'n
- Ole Viktor Hagen as Hans
- Jens Holstad as a music dealer
- Victor Ivarson as Nille's far, a theater director
- Tommie Larsen as Skravla
- Karin Meyer as Markus's mother
- Kåre Næss as Nille
- Tor Oskar Næss as Ola
- Bjørn Pedersen as Knerten
- Stein Rogge as Vorta
- Per Torkildsen as Per
- Knut Tønnesen as Petter, the villain of the street
- Ragnar Østrem as Kjøttkaka

== Reception ==
According to the newspaper Aftenposten, "Norwegian film production's first children's film is thus a reality. It probably does not satisfy the requirements we should set for Norwegian film today, but for the very youngest cinema-goers it is good entertainment."
