= Victoria Cinema =

Multifunctional space

- Interactive map of Victoria Cinema
- Former names: Urania Cinema
- Address: 2 Ciprian Porumbescu Street, Timișoara
- Coordinates: 45°44′29″N 21°13′27″E
- Owner: Timișoara City Hall
- Capacity: 193
- Type: Cinema

Construction
- Built: 1976
- Years active: 1976–2000, 2022–present

Website
- cinemavictoria-tm.ro

The Victoria Cinema is a multifunctional space in Timișoara, Romania, which mainly hosts film screenings, but also theater performances, contemporary dance performances, concerts, debates, and other related events. The program focuses on Romanian and European cinema, as well as independent theatrical productions.

== History ==
Before it existed, its location was occupied by the old Urania Cinema in Alexandru Lahovary Square (present-day Nicolae Bălcescu Square). In 1947, the cinema was renamed Victoria Cinema, and the square became known as Marshal Tito. In 1974, as part of the urban systematization efforts aimed at improving traffic flow from central Timișoara toward the Șag exit, the cinema was demolished. Of the original buildings surrounding the square, only those on the northern side—constructed before 1910—have been preserved; the rest were replaced by four- and seven-story apartment blocks.

In 1976, the new Victoria Cinema was constructed and operated by the state-owned company RADEF. During the 1980s and 1990s, it became one of Timișoara's most popular and well-attended cinemas, known for screening Romanian and Indian blockbusters. In 2000, the cinema closed, and the building took on various new roles: the foyer was used by a medical clinic, while the auditorium was transformed into a disco. In 2017, Timișoara City Hall took over the property, pledging to restore and return it to its original purpose. Renovation work was completed in 2022, and the cinema reopened in September of that year.

In the first year after reopening, Victoria Cinema had almost 40,000 spectators who attended the over 600 events organized here.

== Amenities ==
The hall accommodates 193 seats. Behind the retractable screen lies a stage designed for concerts, theater performances, and various artistic events. Half of the stage is equipped with a hydraulic system, enabling technical staff to assemble and dismantle equipment more efficiently.
