= Gabriel Scott =

Norwegian writer (1874–1958)

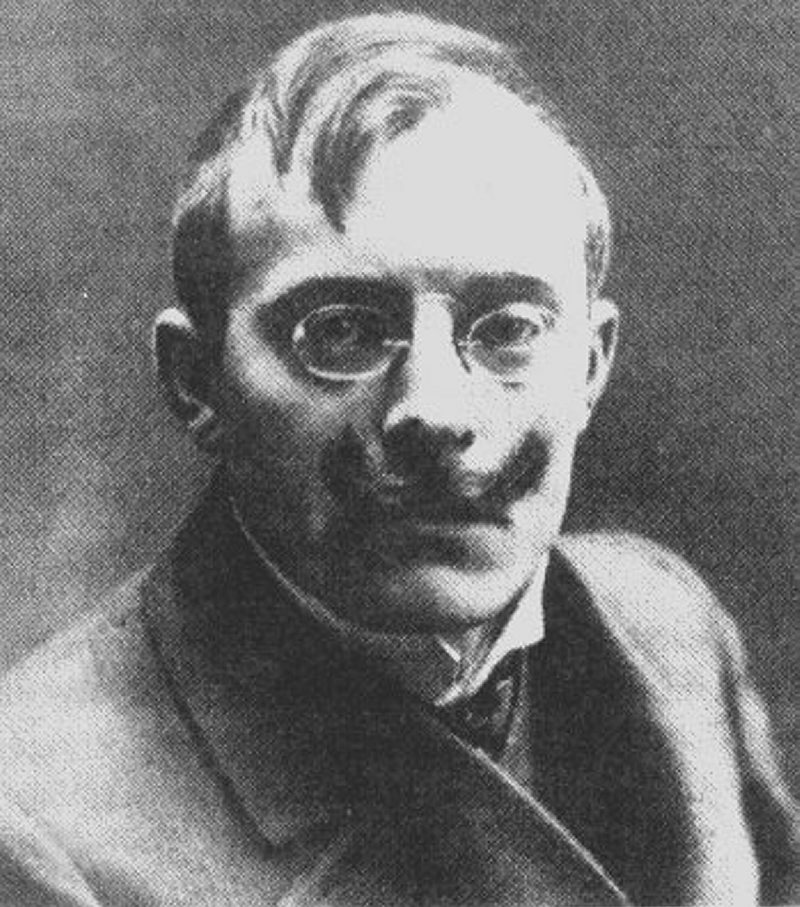
- Born: Gabriel Scott Jensen; 8 March 1874; Leith, Scotland
- Died: 9 July 1958 (aged 84); Arendal, Norway
- Occupations: Poet, novelist, playwright and children's writer
- Spouse(s): Ellen Johansen 1901–12; Dagmar Marie Jensen 1915–18; Birgit Gabrielsen 1918–1958
- Writing career
- Language: Norwegian
- Notable works: Tante Pose, Kilden, Det gyldne Evangelium, Fant
- Notable awards: Gyldendal's Endowment, 1936

Gabriel Scott (8 March 1874 – 9 July 1958) was a Norwegian poet, novelist, playwright and children's writer.

== Personal life ==
Gabriel Scott Jensen was born in Leith in Scotland as the son of sailors' priest Svend Holst Jensen and his wife writer and composer Caroline Mathilde Schytte. The name Scott was originally a first name, and he was named after both Scotland and the writer Walter Scott. He moved to Norway when he was seven years old, his father being a parish priest for Høvåg Church. In 1901, Scott married Ellen Johansen (1871–1914), but this marriage was dissolved in 1912. In 1915, he married secondly Dagmar Marie Jensen, but in 1918 this marriage also ended in divorce. Finally, in 1918, he married Birgit Gabrielsen (1897–1981). He died in Arendal in 1958.

== Career ==
Scott made his literary debut in 1894 with the poetry collection Digte ('Poems'), and followed up with a second collection, Dag ('Day') in 1895. In 1896 he published the love story Aftenrøde. Arkitekt Helmers optegnelser, and the story collection Vester i Skjærene. His 1904 novel Tante Pose ('Aunt Bag') was the basis of the film Tante Pose, 1940. In 1905, he wrote the comedy Himmeluret.

His literary breakthrough was the novel Jernbyrden (1915), which was well received by the critics. His most famous book is the novel Kilden eller Brevet om fiskeren Markus ('The Source, or the Letter about Mark the Fisherman'), 1918, a story about the fisherman Mark living a simple life and presenting simple thoughts. In his book Det gyldne Evangelium ('The Golden Gospel'), 1921, the main characters are Saint Peter and Our Lord, who are seen wandering and meeting people. His books on the Norwegian travelling people, Fant (1928) and Josefa (1930) became popular, and in 1937 Fant was made into a film by Tancred Ibsen. The novel De vergeløse ('The Defenseless'), about a child taken from its mother by the authorities, was made into a film by Leif Sinding in 1939.

Scott wrote several books for children, including Sølvfaks som reiste ut i den vide verden ('Sølvfaks Who Went out into the Wide World'), 1912, which has since gone into many editions, and Hellige tre konger ('We Three Kings'), 1900.

Scott was awarded the Gyldendal's Endowment in 1936.

During the 1930s, he was fundamentally pro-German, publishing articles praising both Vidkun Quisling's National Gathering and Hitler's Germany. This stance was much debated, before, during and after the Second World War. However, before the beginning of the war he had begun to distance himself from the German dictatorship, and during the war he wrote patriotic poetry.

Scott and Vilhelm Krag are now considered southern Norway's most important poets.
