= Sigurd Hoel =

Norwegian writer (1890–1960)

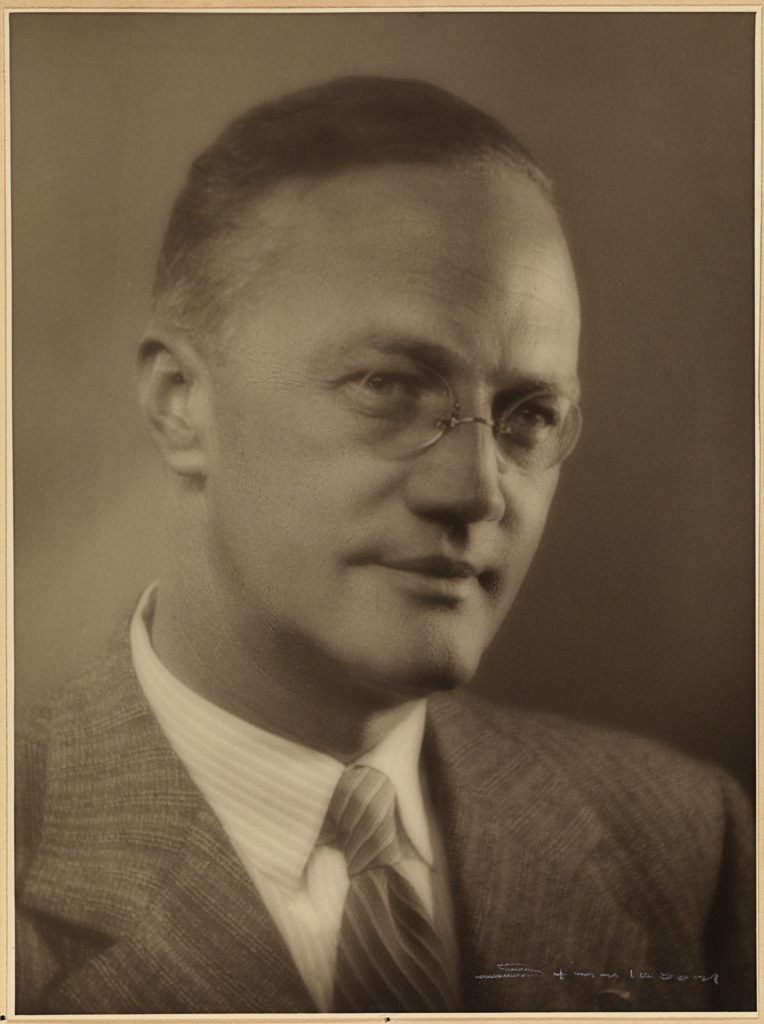
- Sigurd Hoel, 1950.
- Born: December 14, 1890; Nordre Odalen Municipality, Norway
- Died: October 14, 1960 (aged 69); Oslo, Norway
- Occupation: Author
- Spouses: Nic Waal (m. 1927; div. 1936) Ada Ivan (m. 1936)

Sigurd Hoel (December 14, 1890 – October 14, 1960) was a Norwegian author and publishing consultant, born in Nordre Odalen Municipality. A prolific writer and critic, during the World War II he was a member of the Norwegian resistance movement.

In his early years, Hoel was deeply interested in psychoanalysis, for some years he was a dedicated follower of Sigmund Freud, but after 1932 he became close to Wilhelm Reich who deeply influenced subsequent works and views of Hoel.

As a writer, he debuted with the collection of short stories Veien vi gaar (The Way We Go) in 1922. His breakthrough came with Syndere i sommersol (Sinners in Summertime, 1927), which was made into a film in 1932 and in 2002.

Hoel's prose is largely autobiographical. In his books he contemplates the impact of childhood on adulthood and overall man’s character, and the protective mechanisms of the psyche as a result of childhood trauma. Hoel's novels raise questions of morality and sexual freedom as well as themes of betrayal and guilt.

== Life ==
=== Childhood and education ===
Sigurd Hoel was born in Nordre Odalen Municipality, Norway, in 1890. He was the son of teacher Lars Anton and Elisa Dorothea Hoel and grew up in Odalen. Lars Anton, was a village teacher and sang in the church choir. Although Sigurd received a fairly mild upbringing by the standards of the time, his father was strict, authoritarian and emotionally distant. Sigurd's childhood in a strictly patriarchal family and his father's harsh, often unjust attitude had a strong influence on the writer-to-be, and became one of the central themes of his works: feelings of guilt and shame, which were permanently instilled in the child, not only made Hoel's childhood an unhappy period in his life, but also shaped its subsequent course.

After primary school, Hoel was admitted into Ragna Nielsen's school in Oslo where he showed himself as a smart and able student. However, when he finished school in 1909, he could not afford to begin college right away. He worked for a while as an insurance salesman before he could begin his studies in 1910, during which time he supported himself with teaching jobs. Although Hoel was glad to get out of the village, life in the big city came as a shock to him, and for a long time he felt very insecure in front of his urban peers. Gradually he managed to integrate and find friends among the students, in 1913 he started working as a teacher at Ragna Nielsen's Latin School.

In his time at college he was the editor of the periodical Minerva. His literary career began with the short story "Idioten" ('The Idiot') from 1918 that he write in one day for a writing contest. The same year he became an employee of Socialdemokraten as a literature and theater critic. In 1919, Hoel had a child born out of wedlock who was put up for adoption.

In 1920 Hoel wrote the comedy Den Enes Død together with his friend Finn Bø. Harald Grieg got him a job as a consultant for Gyldendal Norsk Forlag and Erling Falk made him the editor of Mot Dag. Hoel's first independent publication was published at the same time: an essay entitled 'A Word about Knut Hamsun'. Hamsun was a literary idol of Hoel, who, although not sharing his political views and condemning many of his actions, appreciated Hamsun's poetic gift. In 1922, Hoel's first short story collection was published, which was strongly influenced by the German expressionists and mainly Hjalmar Söderberg.

In 1924 he made his first foreign trip and visited Prague, Vienna, and Berlin. In Berlin Hoel studied socialism, and there he wrote his first novel, Syvstjernen ('The Seven Star'). Also in his younger years Hoel was a radical along with mostly all his friends and sympathized with the Bolsheviks, already in the 1920s he critically commented on the course of the USSR young government. In 1924, he left Mot Dag due to disagreements with Erling Falk.

=== Adult years ===
He continued on to Paris, where he met Nic Waal, whom he married in Norway in 1927. That same year the book "Sinners in the Summertime" was published, which launched Hoel's literary fame. Nic Waal later said that Hoel "exposed her whole generation" in this book. Indeed the main characters — eight young people discussing feminism, the new morality and psychoanalysis — are very much based on the young Freudians, Waal and her entourage.

In 1931, after Karl Nerup's death, Hoel became a leading consultant at Gyldendal Publishers. He was in charge of the Yellow Series, a series of modern foreign prose that soon became a landmark for the publishing house and became a "window" into international literature. "The Yellow Series was popular not only in Norway, but also in neighbouring countries. Hoel established himself as an unbiased critic, who was not influenced by his own literary tastes, even if he felt a certain amount of scepticism towards modernism and experimental prose. For each of the 101 books in the series Hoel wrote an introductory article. These articles were later published as two separate editions. Up to 1960, Hoel was the most influential literary critic of Norway.

Waal and Hoel separated in 1932, in 1936 the divorce was finalized and the same year Hoel married again, this time to Ada Ivan. The couple had two kids, both died in infancy.

In 1932 in Berlin Hoel met Wilhelm Reich. When Reich moved to Norway in 1934, Hoel began studying psychoanalysis with him. They also collaborated a lot, and Reich's early ideas and theories influenced Hoel considerably: for example, that a child's personality, formed in childhood, remains virtually unchanged throughout life, and that all subsequent events are only a repetition of childhood scenarios. The idea of a "protective barrier", developed by the child under the influence of the guilt and shame constantly instilled in him by his parents, explains the later behavior of the neurotic person, who uses this "armour" to suppress his inner anxiety and his desires. Reich's positive views on sexual freedom were also extremely important to Hoel. Since January 1934 Hoel had received training analysis from Reich but the extent of his own practice as a therapist was limited to four patients.

Hoel contributed to Reich's German language periodical Zeitschrift für Politische Psychologie und Sexualökonomie (Journal for Political Psychology and Sex Economy) and was the editor-in-chief of issues nos. 13 to 15. One of his major essays deals with the Moscow Trials.

During World War II Hoel and his wife returned to Odalen. He joined the Norwegian resistance movement and wrote for the illegal opposition press, publishing at least 50 articles. Journalists in Nazi Germany called Hoel the "evil spirit" of the Norwegian intellectuals and he was abused on German radio. He was constantly facing the threat of arrest, when in 1943 the danger became too high, he was forced to flee to Sweden. The war shocked Hoel, and for many years thereafter he reflected on collaborationism and treason, trying to understand how such a significant number of Norwegians - including Norway's greatest writer, Knut Hamsun, could support Nazism. Topics of guilt and betrayal became central in his 1950s prose.

Hoel had a short connection to the landsmål movement, but later played an active part in the riksmål campaign. He was among the founders of Forfatterforeningen av 1952 ('the Author's Association of 1952') and was the chairman of the Riksmål Society from 1956 to 1959. He died of a heart attack at age 69 in Oslo.

== Body of work ==
His 1931 novel October Day won him the second prize for Scandinavian literature from the publishing house Gyldendal Norsk Forlag, while conservative critics dubbed the book 'sewer literature'. The novel criticizes a typical bourgeois family: it tells the stories of several couples living in the same house in Oslo, each unhappy in their own way. Most of the characters are shown as egocentrically neurotic: critics have said that no other work by Hoel has so many venomously described, angry and hysterical female characters. Largely based on his own marriage crisis with Nic Waal, October Day demonstrates the influence of American prose. The book resonated widely in society and generated a lively discussion of psychoanalysis, one of the first to introduce it to Norway.

Published in 1933, Road to the World's End (Veien til verdens ende) is a child's portrayal from a farm environment. Largely based on Hoel's own childhood, the book demonstrates a strong influence of Sigmund Freud and Wilhelm Reich.

In 1935, going through a mid-life crisis, Hoel published the novel 14 Days to Frosty Nights (Fjorten dager før frostnettene). Based on the author's own life, it again demonstrates the considerable influence of Reich's theories: the protagonist, a well-known doctor, on his 40th birthday looks back and tries to evaluate the years he has lived. Although his life seems to be a model of success, the emotional side of it turns out to be a disaster: he is unable to love himself or accept the feelings of others. Memories of his childhood and adolescence are shown as the cause of his later failures in life, and the taste of betrayal and bitterness of his own mistakes is a major theme. The hero has a mistress, but eventually returns to his wife, haunted by a sense of constantly going in circles. Deceived love and stolen happiness become the main features in the portrait of a life lived in vain.

In 1947, he released the novel Meeting at the Milestone (Møte ved Milepelen). The main theme of the novel is betrayal. Once again drawing on the events of his own life and developing the theme of sexual freedom and Reich's early ideas, the author puts the hero in the shoes of himself as a young man. When the young beloved tells him that she is expecting a child, the hero's face reflects all his thoughts. He thinks that they are young and poor, and "there is no point in getting married". He says nothing for a full minute, only the betrayal is reflected in his face, in his eyes. Although after a minute he manages to overcome his cowardice and tells his beloved words of love and promises her to be faithful, she still walks out of his life. Years later, as a fighter of Norwegian resistance the hero meets his son, a Nazi, follower of Quisling and a collaborator, who leads the arrest of his father.

As the main consultant for Norwegian and translated literature for Gyldendal publishing, Hoel made an impression on a whole generation of Norwegian literature. From 1929 to 1959 Hoel was the editor of the publisher's "Gold Series", where he introduced a number of foreign authors, often with an astounding foresight for which works would remain. The series comprised 101 books — including works from authors such as Ernest Hemingway, F. Scott Fitzgerald and Franz Kafka. Hoel wrote prefaces for all of the books, and the preferences are collected in the books 50 gold (1939) and The last 51 gold (1959).

Hoel explores the theme of guilt in his last novel The Troll Circle, published in 1958. The author analyzes the psychology of a middle-aged Norwegian village in the nineteenth century and shows the roots of the vices — anger, distrust, narrow-mindedness — that become a fruitful soil for totalitarian ideology.

== Works ==
=== Non-fiction ===
==== Biography ====
- Knut Hamsun, O. Norlis, 1920.

==== Articles ====
- 50 gule, Gyldendal, 1939.
- De siste 51 gule, Gyldendal, 1959.

==== Essays ====
- Tanker i mærketid, Gyldendal, 1945
- Tanker fra mange tider, Gyldendal, 1948
- Tanker mellom barken og veden, Gyldendal, 1952
- Tanker om norsk diktning, Gyldendal, 1955

==== Posthumous Articles and Essays ====
- Ettertanker, Gyldendal, 1980. Left behind essays and articles, published by Leif Longum.
- Litterære essays, Dreyer, 1990. Published by Helge Nordahl.

=== Short Stories ===
- Veien vi gaar, Gyldendal, 1922
- Prinsessen på glassberget, Gyldendal, 1939

=== Novels ===
- Syvstjernen, Gyldendal, 1924
- Syndere i sommersol, Gyldendal, 1927
- Ingenting, Gyldendal, 1929
- En dag i oktober, Gyldendal, 1931
- Veien til verdens ende, Gyldendal, 1933
- Fjorten dager før frostnettene, Gyldendal, 1935
- Sesam sesam, Gyldendal, 1938
- Arvestålet, Gyldendal, 1941
- Møte ved milepelen, Gyldendal, 1947
- Jeg er blitt glad i en annen, Gyldendal, 1951
- Stevnemøte med glemte år, Gyldendal, 1954
- Ved foten av Babels tårn, Gyldendal, 1956
- Trollringen, Gyldendal, 1956

=== Drama ===
- Mot muren, Gyldendal, 1930
- Don Juan, Gyldendal, 1930, written together with Helge Krog.

=== Translations ===
- Anita Loos, Gentlemen Prefer Blondes, Gyldendal, 1926.
- Joseph Conrad, The Nigger of the Narcissus, Gyldendal, 1928
- Joseph Conrad, Heart of Darkness, Gyldendal, 1929
- Joseph Conrad, Lord Jim, Gyldendal, 1932
- William Faulkner, Light in August, Gyldendal, 1934
- Arthur Koestler, Arrival and Departure, Gyldendal, 1946

== Awards and distinctions ==
- Gyldendal's Endowment (Gyldendal's Legacy) 1940
- Bokhandlerprisen (Bookseller Award) 1948

== Literature ==
- Noss, Harald S. (1993). A History of Norwegian Literature. University of Nebraska. p. 256. ISBN 0-8032-3317-5.
- Houe, P.; Rossel, S. H. (1998). Images of America in Scandinavia. Rodopi. p. 90. ISBN 9042006218.
- Lyngstad, S. (1984). Sigurd Hoel's Fiction: Cultural Criticism and Tragic Vision. Greenwood Press. ISBN 9780313243431.
- Sjåvik, J. (2006). Historical Dictionary of Scandinavian Literature and Theater. Lanham, Maryland: The Scarecrow Press. pp. 44–283. ISBN 978-0-8108-5563-2.
- Translations on International Communist Developments. Washington. 1961. p. 12.
- O'Leary, Margaret Hayford (2010). Culture and Customs of Norway. Greenwood. p. 114. ISBN 978-978-0-313-364.
