= Adam Eriksen =

Norwegian painter, director, and screenwriter (1852–1931)

- Born: September 17, 1852; Kristiania (now Oslo), Norway
- Died: July 17, 1931 (aged 78); Stabekk, Norway
- Resting place: Our Savior's Cemetery, Oslo, Norway
- Occupations: Painter, photographer, director, and screenwriter
- Relatives: Alfred Eriksen, Solvejg Eriksen

Adam Emanuel Eriksen (September 17, 1852 – July 19, 1931) was a Norwegian painter, photographer, film director, and screenwriter.

== Family ==
Eriksen was born in Kristiania (now Oslo), the son of the watchmaker Henrik Erichsen (1825–1870) and Emilie Kathrine Christoffersen (1825–1902). He was the brother of the politician, newspaper editor, and writer Alfred Eriksen and the uncle of the journalist and author Solvejg Eriksen. He married Olea Pedersen in 1880.

== Career ==
For a while, Eriksen operated the Cordial Cinema in Kristiania (now Oslo). In 1912 he directed the film Anny – en gatepiges roman, which he also wrote the screenplay for. This was his only film.

Eriksen died in Stabekk in 1931, and he was buried at Our Savior's Cemetery in Oslo.

== Filmography ==
- 1912: Anny – en gatepiges roman
