= Meeting at the Milestone =

1947 novel by Sigurd Hoel

First edition

Meeting at the Milestone (Møte ved Milepelen ) is a novel by Sigurd Hoel first published in 1947 by Gyldendal Norsk Forlag. It is considered one of the most significant works of Norwegian literature of the Occupation. It was immediately translated into several other languages.

The novel is narrated in the first person by an occupation-era Resistance member who is dispatched to an unnamed Norwegian town, where people from his own morally ambiguous past reside, in search of a collaborator.

== Background ==
In 1947 the great treason trials were still going on. The legal system considered the actions of individuals and admonished suitable punishment for those actions considered as treason. Many felt that the trials needed to investigate deeper. They should consider not only what the traitors had done during the war. They should also investigate why Nazism appealed to some and not to others. Meeting at the Milestone came as an important contribution in this debate.

The goal of the novel was to show how each individual was responsible for Nazism and also towards other people. The theme of the novel is therefore guilt and responsibility.

The novel is written in first person. Everything is seen from the perspective of the narrator. The narrative is about the actions of the main character as well as his thoughts and reflections. The only name used for the "I" is the nickname "The spotless one".

== Synopsis ==
The novel starts with a short and mysterious prologue, Frontkjemperen (The eastern front volunteer), stated as written in 1947. The narrator talks about "I", "he" who got eight years, "his father" who committed suicide, and "her" who "I" have not spoken with since 1945. Even though this is the fate of strangers, "I" will organise some personal notes.

The first part of the book is identified as being written immediately after this, still in 1947. It talks about the time before 1943 when "I" wrote the second part of the book. He talks about the house that he has bought after lengthy negotiations with the master builder. He lost his family early during the occupation, and he was also imprisoned for a couple of weeks. By the resistance he was called "The spotless one", a nickname he quite appreciated. The leader of the resistance decided that his house was suitable for hiding people who needed to go into hiding.

One day in 1943 a man named Indregaard came to the house. The spotless one knew of him already. Indregaard was depressed and needed to talk about his problems with The spotless one. The conversation soon got to a common acquaintance, Hans Berg, who was a Nazi. Indregaard thought that because of what happened in their youth he was responsible for Hans Berg's Nazism.

The spotless one now starts writing about Hans Berg in order to find out why some people turn to Nazism. This part, which is written in 1943, starts with an analysis of Hans Berg's childhood and youth. The spotless one fails at his analysis. He then tries to analyse others of his fellow students who became Nazis, amongst them Carl Heidenreich, simply and superficially. Again he fails. It becomes evident that it is his own past he wants to analyse.

He describes his childhood, his father, his time as a student in Kristiania, and his first erotic experiences. After a couple of brief relationships he meets "Kari". He stops mid-sentence as he reveals that "Kari" fell pregnant.

The third part is stated as written in Sweden in 1944. The spotless one had to flee after an assignment in the southern part of the country. He was assigned with tracing an informant in a small town. The informant turned out to be his own son by "Kari". She was married to Carl Heidenreich, and her real name was Maria. The spotless one let himself get captured by the Nazis, and was interrogated by Heidenreich. After the torture, or redemption, he experienced a 'vision' where he saw it all. He was rescued by Kari/Maria. He realised during the escape that he was responsible for the downfall of his family.

The final part of the novel is identified as being written in 1947. The spotless one visited Maria when he came back to Norway. He was told that Carl Heidenreich had committed suicide, and that his son, Karsten, had been arrested. Finally he describes fragments of his 'vision'.
