= Bra mennesker =

- Directed by: Leif Sinding
- Written by: Leif Sinding; Oskar Braaten (play)
- Starring: Sonja Wigert; Georg Løkkeberg; Harald Steen; Eva Steen
- Music by: Willy Vieth
- Release date: 25 October 1937
- Running time: 91 minutes
- Country: Norway
- Language: Norwegian

Bra mennesker (English: Good People) is a 1937 Norwegian drama film directed by Leif Sinding, and starring Sonja Wigert, Georg Løkkeberg and Harald Steen. The script was also written by Sinding, based on a play by Oskar Braaten. The film was produced at A/S Merkur-Film and features music by Willy Vieth.
