= Victor Bernau =

Norwegian singer, actor and theatre director

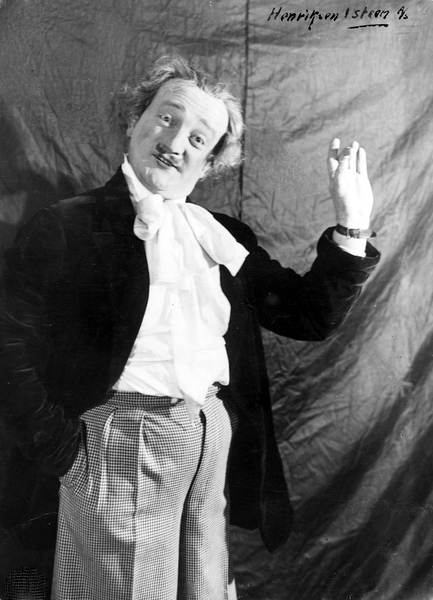
Victor Bernau, c. 1935

Victor Bernau (14 January 1890 – 13 May 1939) was a Norwegian singer, actor and theatre director. He was artistical director at Chat Noir, Scala Teater and Det Nye Teater. He is often regarded as the founder of Norwegian revue.
