= Amund Rydland =

Norwegian actor and theatre director

- Born: 25 November 1888; Alversund, Norway
- Died: 16 February 1967 (aged 78)
- Occupations: actor and theatre director

Amund Rydland (25 November 1888 – 16 February 1967) was a Norwegian stage and film actor and theatre director.

He was born in the village of Alversund in Lindaas Municipality in Søndre Bergenhus county (now part of Alver Municipality in Vestland county). He made his stage debut at Det Norske Teatret in 1913, and served as the theatre's director from 1916 to 1922. He was best known for his comedy characters.

== Selected filmography ==
- Growth of the Soil (1921)
- Farende folk (1922)
- Himmeluret (1925)
- Ugler i mosen (1959)

Cultural offices
Preceded by Edvard Drabløs	Director of the Det Norske Teatret; 1916–1922	Succeeded by Ingjald Haaland
