= By og land hand i hand =

- Directed by: Olav Dalgard
- Written by: Olav Dalgard
- Starring: Hans Bille; Lars Tvinde
- Release date: 1937
- Running time: 58 minutes
- Country: Norway
- Language: Norwegian

By og land hand i hand (Town and Country Hand in Hand) is a 1937 Norwegian drama film written and directed by Olav Dalgard, starring Hans Bille and Lars Tvinde. The film was made by the Norwegian Labour Party for the 1937 local elections.

== Plot ==
The wealthy landowner Hans Bjørnstad (Bille) is approached by his workers for a raise, but is shocked by their radical socialist ideas. Later he talks to another landowner, Nils Tveit (Tvinde), who is more sympathetic to the workers' case. Through conversations with family members in Oslo, the two realise the advantages Labour government has brought, and the necessity of cooperation between town and country for the prosperity of the country.

== Cast ==
- Rønnaug Alten as Tora Larsen
- Hans Bille as Hans Bjørnstad, a farmer from Eastern Norway
- Kolbjørn Brenda as Anton
- Oscar Egede-Nissen as Ole Larsen, a speculator
- Hilda Fredriksen as the woman from Ullern
- Jens Holstad as Larsen
- Tryggve Larssen as Svart-Pelle
- Georg Løkkeberg as Georg Larsen, an engineer
- Ida Rothmann as Sonja, a working girl
- Toralf Sandø as Knudsen, a workshop foreman
- Gunnar Simenstad as Adolf, a construction worker
- Eva Steen as Katrina Larsen
- Lars Tvinde as Nils Tveit, a farmer from Western Norway
