= Du har lovet mig en kone! =

1935 film

- Directed by: Tancred Ibsen; Einar Sissener
- Written by: Tancred Ibsen
- Starring: Randi Brænne; Einar Sissener; Kirsten Heiberg
- Release date: 30 September 1935
- Running time: 77 minutes
- Country: Norway
- Language: Norwegian

Du har lovet mig en kone! (English: You Promised Me a Wife!) is a 1935 Norwegian comedy film written by Tancred Ibsen, and co-directed by Ibsen and Einar Sissener, starring Sissener, Randi Brænne and Kirsten Heiberg.
