= Einar Sissener =

Norwegian stage actor, film actor, stage producer, film producer and theatre director

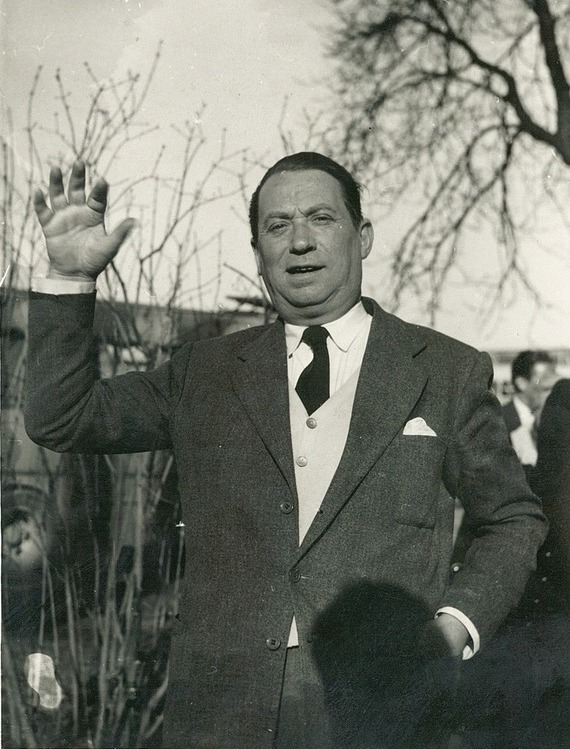
- Einar Sissener, ca. 1955
- Born: 21 September 1897; Kristiania, Norway
- Died: 4 March 1968 (aged 70)
- Occupations: Actor and theatre director
- Awards: Order of St Olav; Order of the Dannebrog

Einar Sissener (21 September 1897 – 4 March 1968) was a Norwegian stage actor, film actor, stage producer, film producer and theatre director.

== Personal life ==
Einar Rasmus Krag Schnitler Sissener was born in Kristiania as the son of dispensing chemist Einar Andreas Sissener and Ida Cathrine Dorthea Schnitler. He studied law at the University of Oslo for three years without finishing, but was active in student organizations, editing the periodical Minerva, heading the student theatre Samfundsteatret, and a board member of the Norwegian Students' Society.

== Career ==
Sissener made his stage debut on Centralteatret in 1919, as the character "Philip" in an adaptation of George Bernard Shaw's play You Never Can Tell. His breakthrough came in 1923 as "Gottfried" in Ludvig Holberg's comedy Det lykkelige Skibbrud (English, The Happy Capsize), and as the title character in Molière's comedy Les Fourberies de Scapin. He worked for the National Theatre from 1924. and was best known for his comedy characters. He played the character "Harald" in Oskar Braaten's comedy Den store barnedåpen (English: The Great Christening) in 1925, one of the National Theatre's greatest successes.

He made his film debut in 1926, in the film Glomdalsbruden, and acted in the first Norwegian sound film, Den store barnedåpen from 1931 (based on Braaten's comedy), again as the character "Harald". In 1934 and 1935 he produced the two films Syndere i sommersol and Du har lovet mig en kone!.

Sissener chaired the Norwegian Actors' Equity Association from 1928 to 1932. He was theatre director for Søilen Teater in 1932. From 1933 to 1937 he was theatre director for Det Nye Teater. From 1937 to 1946 he worked for the revue theatre Chat Noir, both as an actor, stage producer and songwriter.

In 1947 he returned to the National Theatre. His last appearance was in Friedrich Dürrenmatt's comedy Meteor in 1967. He played a total of 127 roles at the National Theatre.

Sissener was decorated Knight, First Class of the Royal Norwegian Order of St. Olav in 1960, and was a knight of the Danish Order of the Dannebrog.
