= Det drønner gjennom dalen =

- Directed by: Olav Dalgard
- Written by: Olav Dalgard
- Starring: Tryggve Larssen; Ragnhild Hald
- Release date: 15 January 1938
- Running time: 50 minutes
- Country: Norway
- Language: Norwegian

Det drønner gjennom dalen (English: A Boom through the Valley) is a 1938 Norwegian drama film written and directed by Olav Dalgard, starring Tryggve Larssen and Ragnhild Hald. It follows the trials and tribulations of contemporary lumberjacks.

== Cast ==
- Tryggve Larssen as Knut Slettås, a forest worker
- Ragnhild Hald as Laura, his wife
- Ida Rothmann as Tordis, their daughter
- Kåre Wicklund as Per, their son
- Astrid Sommer as the grandmother
- Harald Steen as the doctor
- Martin Linge as a policeman
- Finn Bernhoft as a forest worker
- Kolbjørn Brenda as a forest worker
- Rolf Nannestad as a forest worker
- Hans Bille as a forest owner
- Pehr Qværnstrøm as a forest owner
- Martin Gisti as a strikebreaker
