= Olav Dalgard =

Norwegian literary and art historian, filmmaker, author and educator

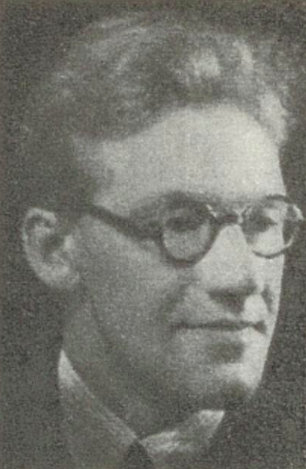
- Olav Dalgard before 1948.
- Born: Olaf Hanssen; June 19, 1898; Folldal Municipality, Norway
- Died: December 25, 1980 (aged 82); Bærum Municipality, Norway
- Education: University of Oslo
- Occupations: Literary and art historian, filmmaker, author and educator
- Political party: Arbeiderpartiet
- Spouse: Anna Marie Sorteberg (m. 1926)
- Children: Odd Steffen Dalgard
- Awards: Literary Collection Literature Prize (1979); Arts Council Norway Honorary Award (1978)

Olav Dalgard (June 19, 1898 – December 25, 1980) was a Norwegian literary and art historian, filmmaker, author and educator.

== Biography ==
Dalgard was born Olaf Hanssen in Folldal Municipality, in Hedmark, Norway. From the age of three, he was raised in Oppdal Municipality in Trøndelag. He earned an M.A. degree in literature and art history at the University of Oslo in 1929. He was an advocate of the use of Nynorsk and served as the chairman of the student Nynorsk association. He was also involved in the Mot Dag movement.

Dalgard worked as a literary critic for the newspapers Dagbladet and Arbeiderbladet. Dalgard took over as dramatic advisor and instructor for Det Norske Teateret in 1931 and was involved with the theater for 48 years.

He studied film in the Soviet Union and in the 1930s produced several films with a socialist message. Dalgard was also active in the Norwegian Labour Party's cultural operations. During the Occupation of Norway by Nazi Germany, Dalgard was arrested in 1942, held as a political prisoner by German authorities and sent to the Sachsenhausen concentration camp.

Dalgard was involved in the establishment of the Norwegian Film Institute and was a member of the state film board. Among his most famous works was Gryr i Norden (1939). Dalgard both wrote the script and directed the film which was a dramatization of the Kristiania Match Workers' Strike of 1889 (fyrstikkarbeiderstreiken). He also wrote a number of books about theater and film as well as biographies including Teateret frå Aiskylos til Ibsen (nonfiction, 1948), Filmskuespillet (nonfiction, 1951), Teateret i det 20. hundreåret (nonfiction, 1955), Lars Tvinde (biography of Lars Tvinde, 1966) and Inge Krokann (biography of Inge Krokann, 1970).

Dalgard was chairman of the Norwegian Literature Critics' Association from 1953 to 1955, and president of the Norwegian Humanist Association from 1965 to 1977. From 1961, Dalgard received a government grant. He was a lecturer in theater history at the Norwegian National Academy of Theatre (Statens teaterhøgskole) and at the Department of Theater Science at the University of Oslo.

== Personal life ==
In 1926, he married Anna Marie Sorteberg (1897–1968). They resided at Voll in Akershus. Psychiatrist Odd Steffen Dalgard was their son.

In 1978 he accepted the Arts Council Norway Honorary Award (Norsk Kulturråds ærespris) and in 1979 he received the Literary Collection Literature Prize (Språklig samlings litteraturpris).

Dalgard died in Bærum Municipality in 1980.

The award Dalgards kritikarpris, now known as Olav Dalgard og Henrik Rytters kritikarpris, was awarded for the first time in 1981. It is given annually to a reviewer in literature, film, or theater by the Norwegian Critics' Association (Kritikerlaget).

== Works ==
=== Books ===
- Frøydis Haavardsholm (1930) OCLC 462505436
- Sosialt teater (1933) OCLC 1119375691
- Vi bygger fabrikken (1934) OCLC 19534220
- I kamp og fest - Nordisk arbeiderlyrikk i utvalg (1936) OCLC 478787151
- Gjennom mørkret. Dikt frå fangelægret (1945) OCLC 247099346
- Filmskuespillet (1951) OCLC 43511805
- Lars Tvinde (1966) OCLC 916865022
- Inge Krokann (1970) OCLC 493097843
- Europeisk drama frå antikken til realismen (1972) ISBN 9788252100204
- Samtid 1. Politikk, kunstliv og kulturkamp i mellomkrigstida (1973) ISBN 9788210007767
- Teatret frå Aiskylos til Ibsen (1974) ISBN 9788252103908
- Teatret i det 20. hundreåret (1976) ISBN 9788252106077
- Samtid 2. Krig og etterkrigsproblem (1978) ISBN 9788210014734
- Kunst og kunstnarar frå Oppdal i gammal og ny tid (1979) ISBN 9788251808071

=== Films ===
- Samhold må til (1935)
- Vi bygger landet (1936)
- By og land hand i hand (1937)
- Det drønner gjennom dalen (1938)
- Lenkene brytes (1938)
- Gryr i Norden (1939)
- Om kjærlighet synger de (1946)
- Vi vil leve (1946)

Awards
| Preceded by Ella Hval | Recipient of the Norsk kulturråds ærespris 1978 | Succeeded by Harald Sæverud |
