= Eldorado Cinema (Oslo) =

Former cinema in Oslo, Norway

Coordinates: 59°54′50″N 10°44′53″E

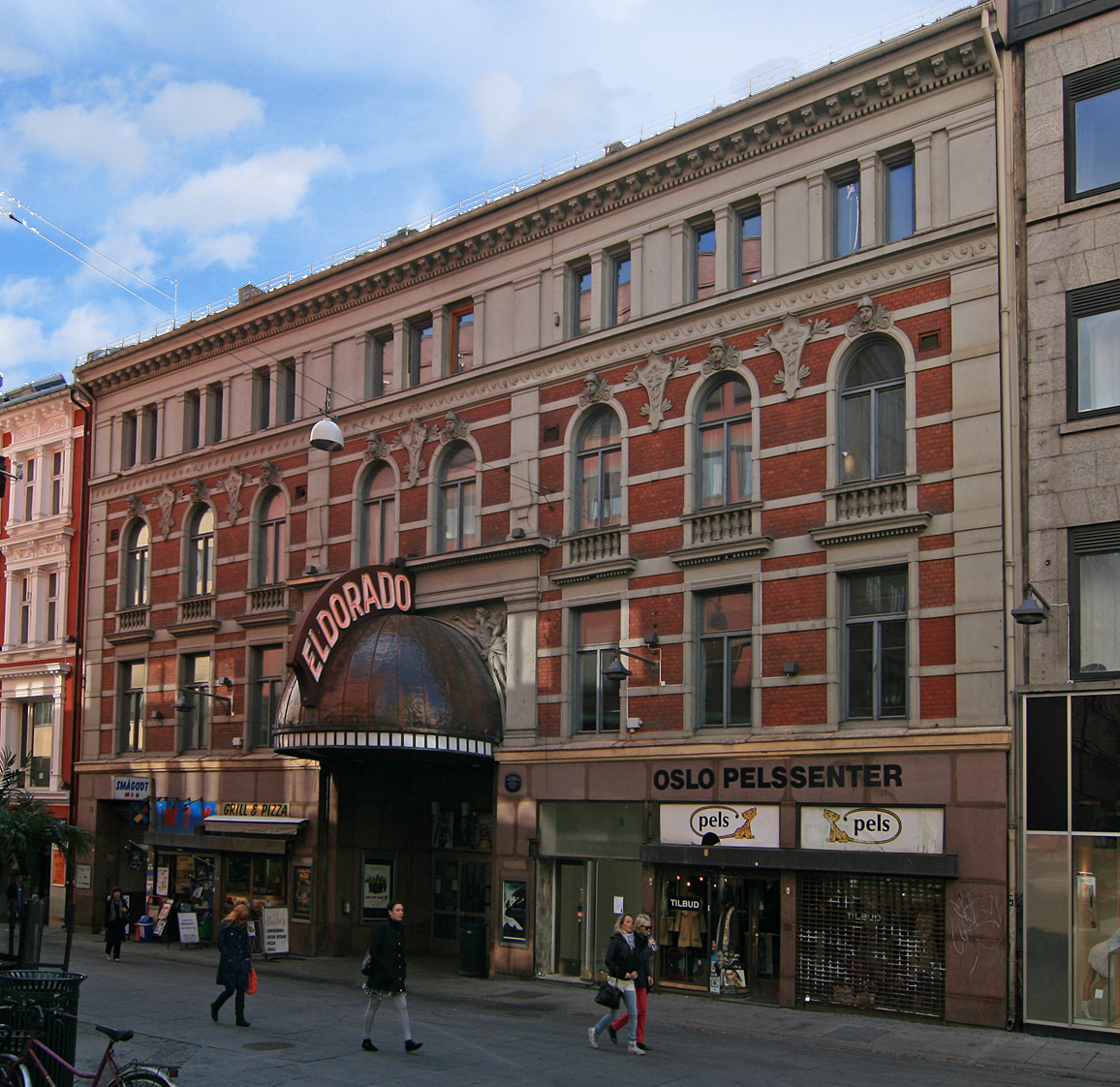
Eldorado

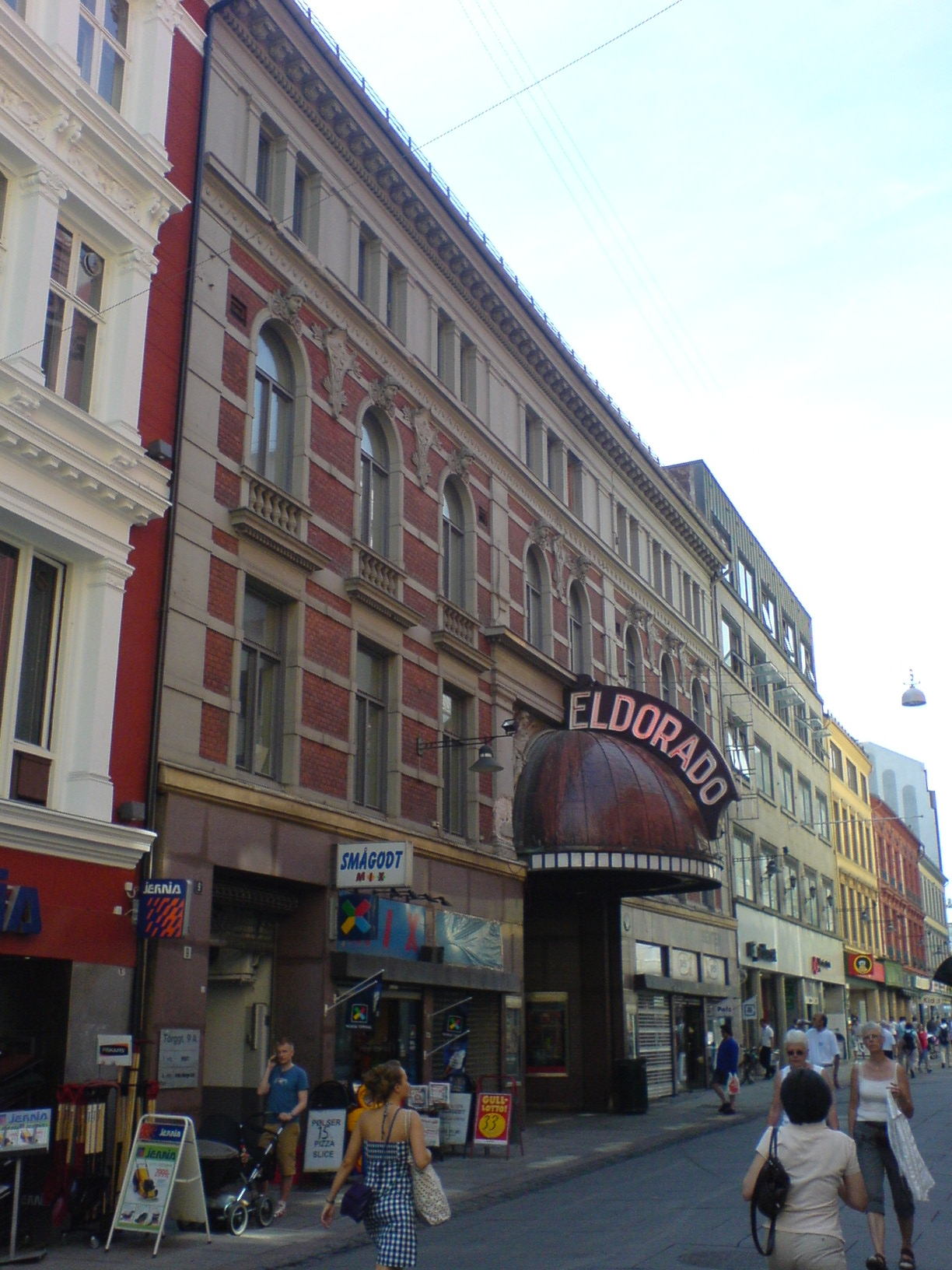
Eldorado seen from the right (2007)

Eldorado Cinema was a multiplex (movie theater) located at Torggata 9 in Oslo sentrum. It had five theaters with 1000 seats, which broke down as 170, 140, 163, 168, and 370 seats in theaters 1, 2, 3, 4, and 5, respectively.

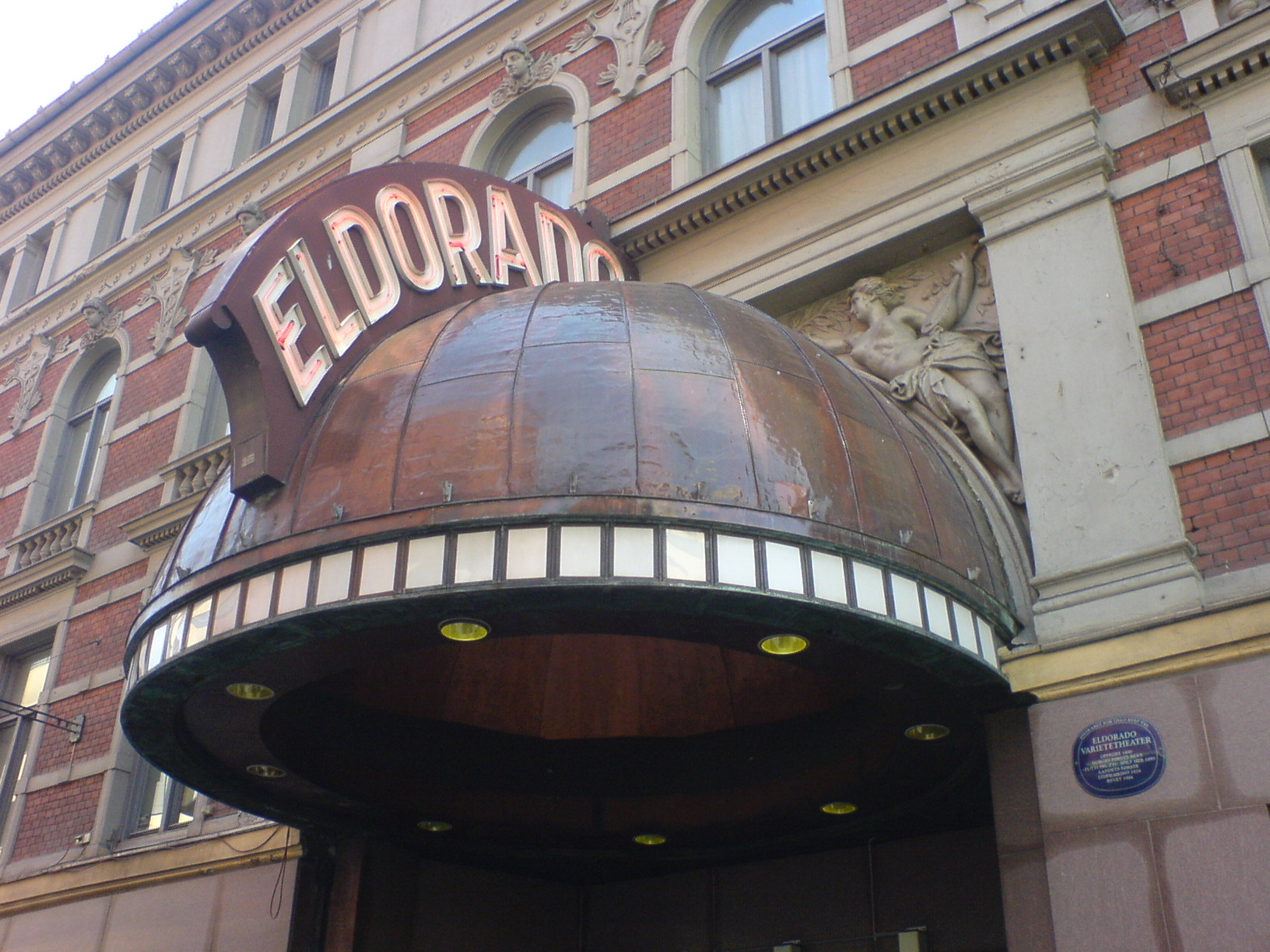
Baldachin over entrance (2007)

== History ==
In 1891 the half-acre plot at Torggata 9 was bought by a company, which constructed two buildings which were designed in the New Renaissance style by architect Harald Olsen. Along Torggata was a four-story building which contained business locations; inside was a courtyard with an area for shows and concerts with seats for 1600 people. In the summer of 1903, the inner building was leased to Fahlstrøms Theater. Architect Bull designed a fan-shaped baldachin in glass over the door along Torggata, together with a glass roof over the theater building. The theater was used for 8 seasons before it went into bankruptcy, and presented its last performance in August 1911. Two days later, a cinema opened in the same building. After a few years this was taken over by a Swedish company and renamed to Admiral Palads.

In 1928 the building was taken over by Oslo Kino. The name Eldorado came in September 1929; at the same time, a sound system was installed. Eldorado was the first cinema in Norway with a sound system, and the first film with sound was The Singing Fool, with Al Jolson in the main role.

Eldorado showed typical westerns and spy movies for many decades, and was one of the premiere theaters for James Bond films. Dr. No had its Norwegian premiere here on 1 April 1963.

Up until 1986, the cinema had one theater with 1195 seats, divided between the balcony and the main floor. The cinema was rebuilt into a multiplex with five theaters with a capacity of 1132 seats. All theaters were refurbished in 2000, and the capacity was reduced to 1000 seats, with the distance between the rows having been increased.

On 19 August 2012 the cinema closed and has subsequently re-opened as a book store, converting many of the cinemas into open space for bookshelves. It also sells stationery, has a classical music section and will soon have a coffee shop.

== Literature ==
- Filmmagasinet 02/2007, pages 8–9
