= Gunnar Nilsen-Vig =

Norwegian cinematographer and director (1886–1959)

- Born: September 20, 1886
- Died: July 8, 1959 (aged 72)
- Occupations: Cinematographer, film director

Gunnar Nilsen-Vig (September 20, 1886 – July 8, 1959) was a Norwegian cinematographer, scriptwriter, and film director.

Nilsen-Vig came into contact with the director Rasmus Breistein via the company Kommunenes Filmcentral. He became Breistein's permanent cinematographer and was involved in most of Breistein's films, from Fante-Anne (1920) to Trysil-Knut (1942). He also worked as a cinematographer for other directors, including for the Norwegian–German film The Woman in the Advocate's Gown (1929, directed by Adolf Trotz). In 1923, Nilsen-Vig directed his only film, Strandhugg paa Kavringen (now considered lost), together with Trygve Dalseg.

== Filmography ==
=== Cinematographer ===
- 1920: Fante-Anne
- 1921: Jomfru Trofast
- 1921: Felix
- 1923: Strandhugg paa Kavringen
- 1926: Brudeferden i Hardanger
- 1927: Madame besøker Oslo
- 1929: Frøken Statsadvokat
- 1930: Kristine Valdresdatter
- 1931: Den store barnedåpen
- 1932: En glad gutt
- 1932: Skjærgårdsflirt
- 1934: Syndere i sommersol
- 1934: Liv
- 1935: Du har lovet mig en kone!
- 1938: Ungen
- 1942: Trysil-Knut

=== Director ===
- 1923: Strandhugg paa Kavringen

=== Scriptwriter ===
- 1921: Felix
- 1923: Strandhugg paa Kavringen
