= Finn Bernhoft =

Norwegian actor

- Born: February 6, 1898; Kristiania (now Oslo), Norway
- Died: April 27, 1981 (aged 83)
- Occupation: Actor

Finn Hugo Bernhoft (February 6, 1898 – April 27, 1981) was a Norwegian theater and film actor.

== Career ==
Bernhoft was born in Kristiania (now Oslo), Norway. He debuted in 1917 in Edvard Drabløs's touring theater, and he started working with the Trondheim National Theater that same year. He later played at Chat Noir, the Carl Johan Theater, and the Central Theater, and from 1948 to 1958 he was engaged with the Trøndelag Theater. In addition to many roles in comedies, operettas, and musicals, he won acclaim as Morten Kiil in Henrik Ibsen's An Enemy of the People and as the riding master in August Strindberg's The Father.

In film, Bernhoft had almost 30 supporting roles over a period of 40 years. He made his film debut in 1929 in the Norwegian silent film Laila. After that he appeared in Fantegutten (1932), Skjærgårdsflirt (1932), Bør Børson Jr. (1938), Gategutter (1949), Pappa tar gull (1964), and An-Magritt (1969), which was his last film role. He also appeared in some performances on NRK's Television Theater, including Går ut i kveld (1961) and Læraren (1963).

Bernhoft lived in Slependen.

== Filmography ==
- 1929: Laila as C.O. Lind, a trader
- 1930: Eskimo as the helmsman
- 1931: Den store barnedåpen
- 1932: Fantegutten as Bottolf
- 1932: Prinsessen som ingen kunne målbinde as Fenriken
- 1932: Skjærgårdsflirt as Andersen, a wholesaler
- 1936: Morderen uten ansikt as Hansen, a manager
- 1936: Norge for folket
- 1937: Bra mennesker as the sheriff
- 1937: Laila as Lind, a trader
- 1938: Bør Børson Jr. as Jens, a smallholder
- 1938: Det drønner gjennom dalen as a forest worker
- 1939: De vergeløse as the sheriff
- 1941: Gullfjellet as Jon
- 1942: Det æ'kke te å tru as Pedersen
- 1942: Den farlige leken
- 1946: Om kjærligheten synger de
- 1948: Dit vindarna bär as a farmer
- 1948: Kampen om tungtvannet
- 1949: Gategutter as Reidar's father
- 1952: Vi vil skilles as the mover
- 1960: Det store varpet
- 1962: Tonny
- 1963: Freske fraspark
- 1964: Pappa tar gull as Muggen
- 1966: Broder Gabrielsen as Andersen
- 1969: An-Magritt as the sheriff

=== Television ===
- 1961: Går ut i kveld as the bartender in the coffee shop
- 1963: Læraren
