= To fluer i ett smekk =

- Directed by: Eric Johnson
- Written by: Eric Johnson
- Produced by: Anne Vennerød
- Starring: Sverre Wilberg; Iver Hole
- Cinematography: Eric Johnson
- Music by: Magne Amdahl
- Distributed by: Kommunenes Filmcentral
- Release date: October 10, 1973
- Running time: 77 minutes
- Country: Norway
- Language: Norwegian

To fluer i ett smekk (Two Birds with One Stone) is a Norwegian comedy crime film from 1973 directed by Eric Johnson. Johnson also wrote the screenplay.

== Plot ==
Bobla, who has a history of run-ins with the police, has taken a job as a weightlifter at a circus. When one day he discovers the parrot Clara in the open window of Miss Jacobsen, he cannot help but steal it. The sick and bedridden woman hears Clara scream, but she thinks that it is Yngve who is playing with it; Yngve sometimes helps her with a little of everything. Today, Yngve has picked up medicine at the pharmacy. Shortly after Bobla has sneaked away, Yngve arrives with Turid and the pony Cæsar. The children look for the parrot and ask Miss Jacobsen if it is in the garden. She is startled and realizes that Clara has disappeared. The children decide to find the parrot.

== Cast ==
- Sverre Wilberg as Streken
- Arild Arnardo as the trainer
- Arne Arnardo as the circus director
- Eva Arnardo as the lady in the basket
- Geir Børresen as Pedersen
- Unni Einertsen as Yngve's mother
- Per Hagelund as the fire chief
- Kristian Henriksen as Baldriansen
- Willie Hoel as Johansen
- Iver Hole as Bobla
- Solveig Johnsen as Miss Jakobsen
- Lille Tom as the clown
- Birger Løvaas as the station master
- Tonje Nygaard as Yngve's sister
- Ragnar Olason as Fredriksen
- Yngve Sandboe as Yngve
- Karl Sigernes as the baker
- Hilde Simensen as Turid
- Arne Solberg as the butcher
- Kjell Stormoen as the speaker
- Aagot Støkken as a lady
- Ulf Wengård as the gardener
- Ingrid Øvre Wiik as a lady
