= Hu Dagmar =

1939 film

- Directed by: Rasmus Breistein
- Written by: Rasmus Breistein; Ove Ansteinsson
- Based on: Ove Ansteinsson's play Hu Dagmar
- Produced by: Titus Vibe-Müller
- Starring: Arne Bang-Hansen; Randi Heide Steen; Eva Sletto
- Cinematography: Reidar Lund
- Edited by: Titus Vibe-Müller
- Music by: Ottar E. Akre; Adolf Kristoffer Nielsen
- Distributed by: Meteor Film
- Release date: November 16, 1939
- Running time: 95 minutes
- Country: Norway
- Language: Norwegian

Hu Dagmar (Wow, Dagmar) is a Norwegian drama comedy film from 1939 directed by Rasmus Breistein. It is based on Ove Ansteinsson's play Hu Dagmar. Breistein and Ansteinsson also wrote the film's script together. The film stars Randi Heide Steen, Arne Bang-Hansen, and Eva Sletto.

== Plot ==
Sjur returns one summer day to his parents' home at Råvangen. He has just become a corporal in Oslo, and he brings with him his fiancée Dagmar, a beautiful and distinctively city girl. Dagmar will live at Råvangen this summer, while Sjur travels around the heath. Dagmar is met with great skepticism both by Sjur's family and by the villagers, and not least by Ingeborg, Sjur's old girlfriend. It does not take long before Dagmar flirts wildly with the men in the village and not even Sjur's father, Ola, escapes her influence. When Sjur comes home, the couple goes out to dance. Dagmar dances with many men, Sjur gets drunk, and Ingeborg takes care of him. A few days later, one of Dagmar's admirers, Jens, comes and offers her NOK 5,000 to end her engagement with Sjur and marry him instead. Dagmar needs the money and therefore agrees. However, the money has been stolen, and Dagmar is forced to pay it back. Sjur returns to Ingeborg and is happy that his relationship with Dagmar is over.

== Cast ==
- Arne Bang-Hansen as Sjur
- Randi Heide Steen as Dagmar
- Eva Sletto as Ingeborg
- Einar Vaage as Ola Råvangen
- Tove Bryn as Marte-Marja, Ola's wife
- Martin Gisti as Embret Storberget
- Toralf Sandø as Jens Sigfridstad
- Olga Sjøgren as Olina, a servant girl
- Alfred Solaas as Olaf, a farm boy at Råvangen
- Alf Sommer as Mentz
- Astrid Sommer as Berte-Marja
