= Lisbeth Nyborg =

Norwegian actress (1887–1976)

- Born: April 15, 1887
- Died: September 10, 1976 (aged 89); Oslo, Norway
- Occupation: Actress

Elisabeth Jenny Nyborg (April 15, 1887 – September 10, 1976) was a Norwegian actress.

Nyborg had her film debut in 1932 in Rasmus Breistein's comedy Skjærgårdsflirt. She appeared in five films altogether from 1932 to 1941. Nyborg was also engaged with the Oslo New Theater as an actress and prompter.

== Filmography ==
- 1914: Fredriksen Fald as a switchboard operator
- 1932: Skjærgårdsflirt as Augusta Østerholm
- 1934: Liv as a farmwife
- 1939: De vergeløse as Myrbråten's wife
- 1941: Gullfjellet as Berte Kanten
- 1943: Vigdis as a farmer's wife
