= Sletto =

Sletto is a surname. Notable people with the surname include:

- Eva Sletto (1912–2006), Norwegian actress
- Olav Sletto, Norwegian writer
