= Jomfru Trofast =

1921 film

- Directed by: Rasmus Breistein
- Written by: Vilhelm Krag; Rasmus Breistein
- Based on: Jomfru Trofast: folkekomedie i 4 akter, by Vilhelm Krag
- Produced by: Edgar Bekkevold
- Starring: Edvard Drabløs; Aasta Nielsen; Henrik Børseth; Henny Skjønberg; Lars Tvinde; Eugen Skjønberg
- Cinematography: Gunnar Nilsen-Vig
- Edited by: Gunnar Nilsen-Vig
- Music by: Adolf Kristoffer Nielsen
- Distributed by: Kommunenes Filmcentral
- Release date: 1921
- Running time: 87 minutes
- Country: Norway
- Language: Norwegian

Jomfru Trofast (Miss Faithful) is a Norwegian film from 1921 based on a folk play with a script by Vilhelm Krag. The film is a story from Southern Norway and was directed by Rasmus Breistein. The sets were designed by Egil Sætren. The film is fully preserved, and it has been restored and digitized.

== Plot ==
Tone, who lives with her uncle Albertus, is in love with the Tellef, a poor sailor. Albertus sends Tellef to sea to prevent the relationship from developing. Tone becomes upset and promises eternal faithfulness to Tellef, and she rejects every suitor that comes to her. Albertus sends a letter to Tellef, who is in Pensacola, Florida, and says that Tone is planning to marry the bailiff. Tellef leaves the ship he is working on and then the ship is wrecked, and so everyone assumes that he has died. Tone holds herself to her promise of fidelity and moves in with Tellef's mother. A few years later, Tellef meets a friend from home in Pensacola, and he tells Tellef that the ship sank, Tone is still unmarried, and Albertus lied to him. Tellef travels home immediately, arriving just in time to prevent a foreclosure on his mother's house, and he and Tone are reunited.

== Cast ==
- Aasta Nielsen as Tone (Miss Faithful)
- Henrik Børseth as Tellef
- Edvard Drabløs as Albertus Kvalhei, Tone's uncle
- Lars Tvinde as Killingland, the bailiff
- Henny Skjønberg as Stine, Tellef's mother
- Eugen Skjønberg as Peder Flotten
- Botten Soot as Mary, a bar girl in Pensacola
- Johannes Jensen as the priest
- Egil Sætren as a sailor
