= Skjærgårdsflirt =

1932 film

- Directed by: Rasmus Breistein
- Written by: Rasmus Breistein
- Based on: Gideon Wahlberg's play Skjærgårdsflirt
- Produced by: Rasmus Breistein
- Starring: Arne Kleve; Olga Sjøgren; Birger Løvaas; Bjørn Bjørnevik; Kristian Hefte; Else Bull; Lisbeth Nyborg; Finn Bernhof; Astrid Leikvang; Vilhelm Lund
- Cinematography: Gunnar Nilsen-Vig
- Edited by: Gunnar Nilsen-Vig
- Music by: Thomas Kristiansen
- Distributed by: Kommunenes filmcentral
- Release date: December 26, 1932
- Running time: 100 minutes
- Countries: Norway; Sweden
- Language: Norwegian

Skjærgårdsflirt (Skerry Flirtation) is a Norwegian comedy film from 1932 directed by Rasmus Breistein. It is based on a play of the same name by Gideon Wahlberg. The film is considered lost.

== Cast ==
- Else Bull as Inga Sjøholm, Sjøholm's daughter
- Kristian Hefte as Erik Østerman, Østerman's son
- Finn Bernhoft as Andersen, a wholesaler
- Bjørn Bjørnevik as Sjøholm, a farmer
- Arne Kleve as Østerman, a fisherman
- Vilhelm Lund as Hans, Andersen's nephew
- Birger Løvaas as Karl Anton, a servant boy at the Østerman house
- Lisbeth Nyborg as Augusta Østerman
- Astrid Schwab as Lily Andersen, Andersen's daughter
- Olga Sjøgren as Katrine, a servant girl at the Østerman house
