= Vilhelm Lund =

Norwegian actor (1900–1982)

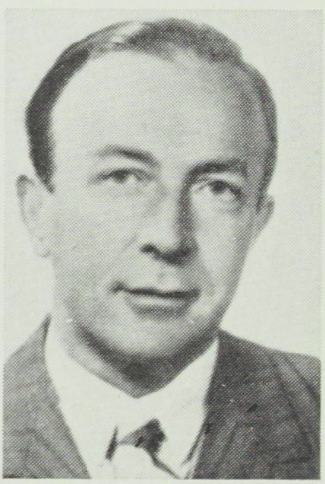
- Born: April 7, 1900; Kristiania (now Oslo), Norway
- Died: January 7, 1982 (aged 81); Oslo, Norway
- Resting place: Ullern Cemetery
- Occupation: Actor
- Spouse: Dagmar Myhrvold
- Children: Trini Lund

Vilhelm Lund, sometimes credited as Wilhelm Lund (April 7, 1900 – January 7, 1982), was a Norwegian actor.

Lund was primarily a theater actor. After a study visit to Oxford in 1919 and preparatory studies, he made his theatrical debut in Frank Wedekind's 1891 drama Spring Awakening. He performed at the experimental Intimate Theater (Norwegian: Intimteatret) in 1922, during the one season it was active. From 1924 to 1934 he was at the Central Theater, the Norwegian Theater, and Søilen Theater. After a pause from 1934 to 1945, he was again engaged with the Norwegian Theater in 1945.

Lund's film debut was in 1926 in Rasmus Breistein's Brudeferden i Hardanger. He appeared sporadically in films and on television until 1980, and he played twelve different roles altogether.

Around 1949, he took a break from the Norwegian Theater, during which he toured Europe with the dance troupe of the Indian dancer Ram Gopal. Lund also ran a small farm for a year and spent time in London before appearing at various Norwegian theaters, including the Rogaland Theater, People's Theater, Norwegian National Opera, and NRK's Television Theater, where he remained for a time. From 1964 to 1977 he performed several roles at the National Theater.

Lund was married first to the actress Dagmar Myhrvold (1898–1972), and then in 1934 to Kathleen Austin (1917–1957). His daughter Anne Mari (born 1929) published the travelogue Ferden til Shigaraki (Journey to Shigaraki). His second daughter, Trini Lund (born 1951), became an actress. In 1963, Lund married Nancy Austin (1914–1990).

== Filmography ==
- 1926: Brudeferden i Hardanger as Tore Skjølte
- 1932: Skjærgårdsflirt as Hans, Andersen's nephew
- 1946: Vi vil leve (as Wilhelm Lund) as the German prison director at no. 19
- 1946: Englandsfarere as Hamar, an engineer
- 1966: Hunger (uncredited)
- 1977: Åpenbaringen (as Wilhelm Lund) as the father
