= Egil Sætren =

Norwegian actor (1894–1964)

- Born: May 11, 1894
- Died: June 18, 1964 (aged 70)
- Occupations: Film set designer, actor

Egil Sætren (May 11, 1894 – June 18, 1964) was a Norwegian film set designer and actor. He debuted as an actor and set designer in the 1921 film Jomfru Trofast.

== Filmography ==
=== As set designer ===
- 1921: Jomfru Trofast
- 1921: Felix
- 1923: Strandhugg paa Kavringen
- 1925: Himmeluret
- 1932: Fantegutten
- 1933: Jeppe på bjerget
- 1934: Sangen om Rondane

=== As actor ===
- 1921: Jomfru Trofast
- 1932: Fantegutten
