= Nils Hald =

Norwegian actor

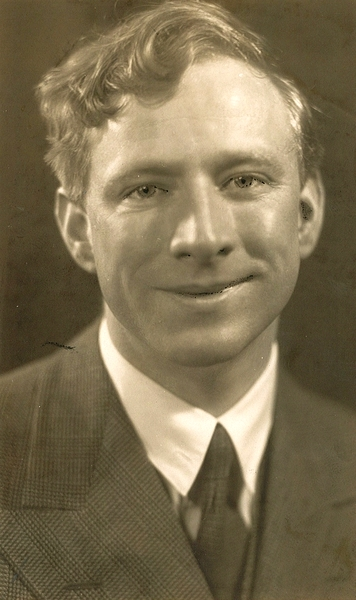
- Born: October 12, 1897; Kristiansand, Norway
- Died: July 14, 1963 (aged 65); Oslo, Norway
- Occupation: Actor
- Spouse: Ragnhild Hald
- Parents: Johan Christian Thor Hald (father); Karen Marie Gundersen (mother)

Nils Mauritz Hald (October 12, 1897 – July 14, 1963) was a Norwegian actor.

Hald was born in Kristiansand, Norway, the son of the bookbinder Johan Christian Thor Hald (1865–1902) and Karen Marie Gundersen (1864–1944). He was married to the actress Ragnhild Hald from 1922 to 1938.

Hald made his film debut in Rasmus Breistein's 1921 film Felix. A year later he appeared in Farende folk, but then did not appear in any further films until 1936. He then appeared in a number of other roles until 1961. Hald was also engaged with the Norwegian Theater in the 1940s and 1950s.

== Filmography ==
- 1921: Felix as Torleif, the pilot's son
- 1922: Farende folk as Jonas Værn
- 1936: Dyrk jorden! as Hjalmar
- 1946: Vi vil leve as Harald's father
- 1946: Om kjærligheten synger de as Drøbak
- 1950: To mistenkelige personer
- 1956: Roser til Monica as the gardener
- 1958: Høysommer as Trond

== Television ==
- 1961: Går ut i kveld as Mr. Ryan
