= Ragnhild Hald =

Norwegian actress (1896–1975)

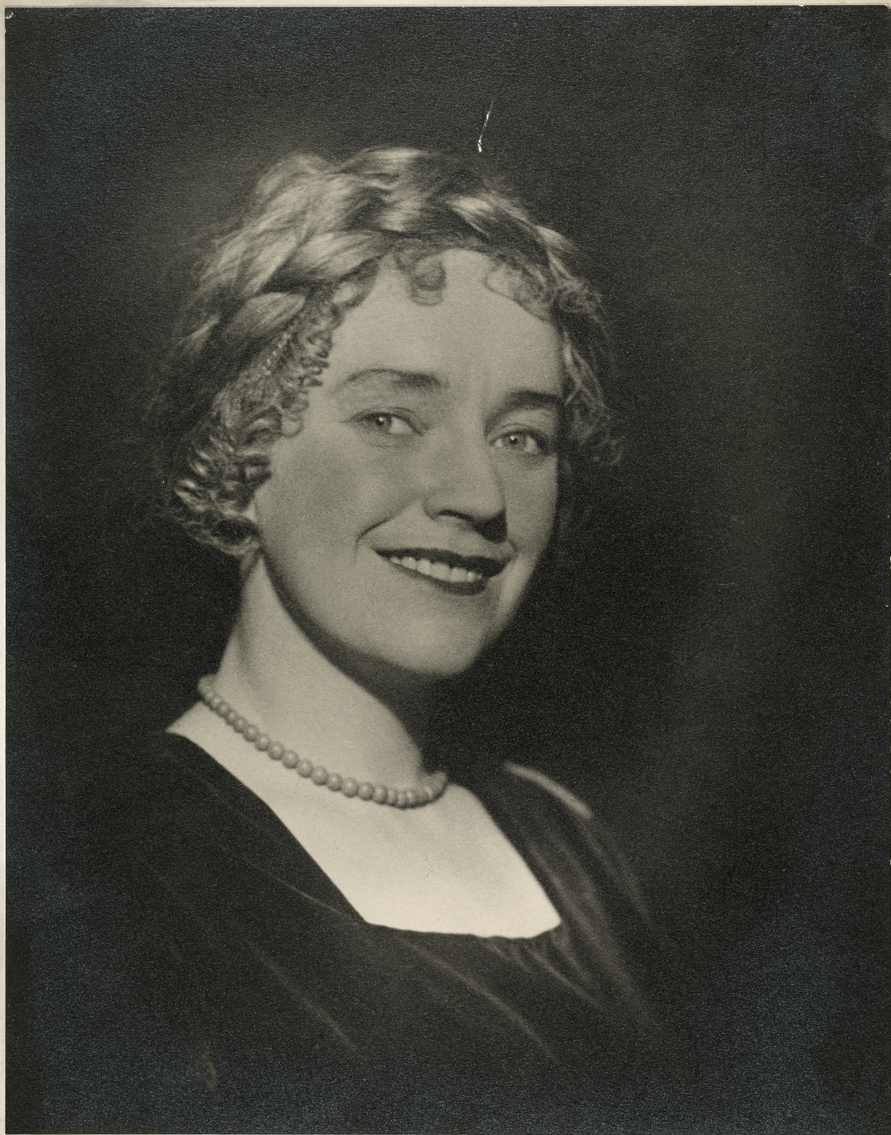
- Born: November 9, 1896; Kristiania (now Oslo), Norway
- Died: July 17, 1975 (aged 78); Oslo, Norway
- Resting place: Vestre gravlund
- Occupation: Actress
- Spouses: Nils Hald, Rolf Nesch
- Parents: Olav Torjesen Fjermeros (father); Ingebjørg Skaaraas (mother)

Ragnhild Fjermeros Hald (November 9, 1896 – July 17, 1975) was a Norwegian actress.

After attending high school from 1910 to 1913, she studied under Inga Jacobi. She was then engaged with the Norwegian Theater from 1919 to 1952, as well as the National Theater from 1930 to 1933, and finally with the People's Theater from 1952 onward.

She was married to the actor Nils Hald from 1922 to 1938, and then to the visual artist Rolf Nesch from 1950 to 1975.

== Awards ==
- 1938: Hulda Garborg scholarship
- 1946: first honorary award from the Norwegian Association of Artists with a prize of NOK 6,000
- 1951/52: Norwegian Theatre Critics Award for her role as Nille in The Madwoman of Chaillot by Jean Giraudoux
- 1960: King's Medal of Merit in gold

== Filmography ==
- 1922: Farende folk as a young woman (uncredited)
- 1932: En glad gutt as Øyvind's mother
- 1938: Det drønner gjennom dalen as Laura, Knut's wife
- 1938: Ungen as Hønse-Lovisa
- 1939: Gryr i Norden as Halldis, a manager
- 1940: Godvakker-Maren as Andreas's wife
- 1941: Gullfjellet as Olea, a dairy maid
- 1946: Vi vil leve as Harald's mother
- 1951: Storfolk og småfolk as Ander's wife
- 1962: Kalde spor
