= Fante-Anne =

1920 film

- Directed by: Rasmus Breistein
- Written by: Rasmus Breistein
- Based on: Fante-Anne, by Kristofer Janson
- Starring: Aasta Nielsen; Einar Tveito; Johanne Bruhn; Lars Tvinde; Dagmar Myhrvold
- Cinematography: Gunnar Nilsen-Vig
- Music by: Halldor Krogh
- Release date: 1920
- Running time: 93 minutes
- Country: Norway
- Language: Norwegian intertitles

Fante-Anne (Gypsy Anne) is a Norwegian silent film from 1920 directed by Rasmus Breistein. The film is based on a rural story by Kristofer Janson from 1868.

== Film history ==
Fante-Anne is considered to mark the beginning of the national breakthrough in the Norwegian film culture. This was the first Norwegian film to feature professional actors. Unlike previous films made in Norway, Fante-Anne was also made with professionals working at all levels behind the camera. It is also noteworthy as one of the few Norwegian films from this period with Norwegians participating at all levels because Norwegian films were often created by Swedes, Danes, and Germans. Fante-Anne is therefore regarded as the first professional Norwegian feature film.

The film makes use of the Norwegian landscape and rural lifestyle where the action takes place. The film was the first for which the distributor Kommunenes Filmcentral and Norwegian cinema owners were involved in the production. Fante-Anne was also the start of the over three-decade career of Rasmus Breistein, one of the most prominent Norwegian directors of the 20th century.

The film was restored and reissued in 2011, with new music written by Halldor Krogh. Originally, the director Rasmus Breistein himself played the fiddle during screenings of the film.

== Plot ==
Fante-Anne (1920)

Anne, an orphan girl, is raised by the Storlein family on a large farm. After the family's son breaks his promise to live with her and marries another, jealousy causes her to set fire to the farmhouse. Another young man, Jon, is in love with her; he takes the blame for the fire and serves several years of hard labor at Akershus Fortress. After he is released Anne meets him on the road and he persuades Anne and his mother to travel to America together to begin a new life.

== Cast ==
- Aasta Nielsen: Anne ("Fante-Anne")
- Einar Tveito: Jon Sandbakken, the cottager
- Johanne Bruhn: the farmwife
- Lars Tvinde: Haldor, her son
- Dagmar Myhrvold: Anne's mother
- Henny Skjønberg: Jon's mother
- Kristine Ullmo: Margit Moen, the wealthy farm girl
- Magnus Falkberget: the neighbor boy
- Anders Skrede: the bailiff
- Edvard Drabløs: the judge
- Elsa Vang: Anne as a child
- Olaf Solberg: Haldor as a child
- Olav Øygard: the priest
