= Tove Bryn =

Norwegian actress (1903–1983)

- Born: November 27, 1903
- Died: June 24, 1983 (aged 79)
- Occupation: Actress
- Spouse: Ingjald Haaland

Tove Bryn (a.k.a. Tove Trollstugo, November 27, 1903 – June 24, 1983) was a Norwegian actress.

Bryn had her film debut in 1920 in Gustav Adolf Olsen's Kaksen paa Øverland, in which she played the role of a huldra. In the 1930s and 1940s she appeared in three films directed by Rasmus Breistein: Ungen (1938, as Petrina), Hu Dagmar (1939, as Marte-Maja), and Gullfjellet (1941, as Olaug Benningstad).

Tove Bryn was the second wife of the actor, film director, and theater director Ingjald Haaland.

== Filmography ==
- 1920: Kaksen paa Øverland as a hulder
- 1938: Ungen as Petrina
- 1939: Hu Dagmar as Marte-Maja
- 1941: Gullfjellet as Olaug Benningstad
