= Kjølstad =

Kjølstad is a surname. Notable people with the surname include:

- Elly Kjølstad (1850–1930), Norwegian stage actress
- Johan Kjølstad (born 1983), Norwegian cross-country skier

== See also ==
- Gustav Kjølstad Nyheim (born 2006), Norwegian footballer
