= Johanne Bruhn =

Norwegian actress (1890–1921)

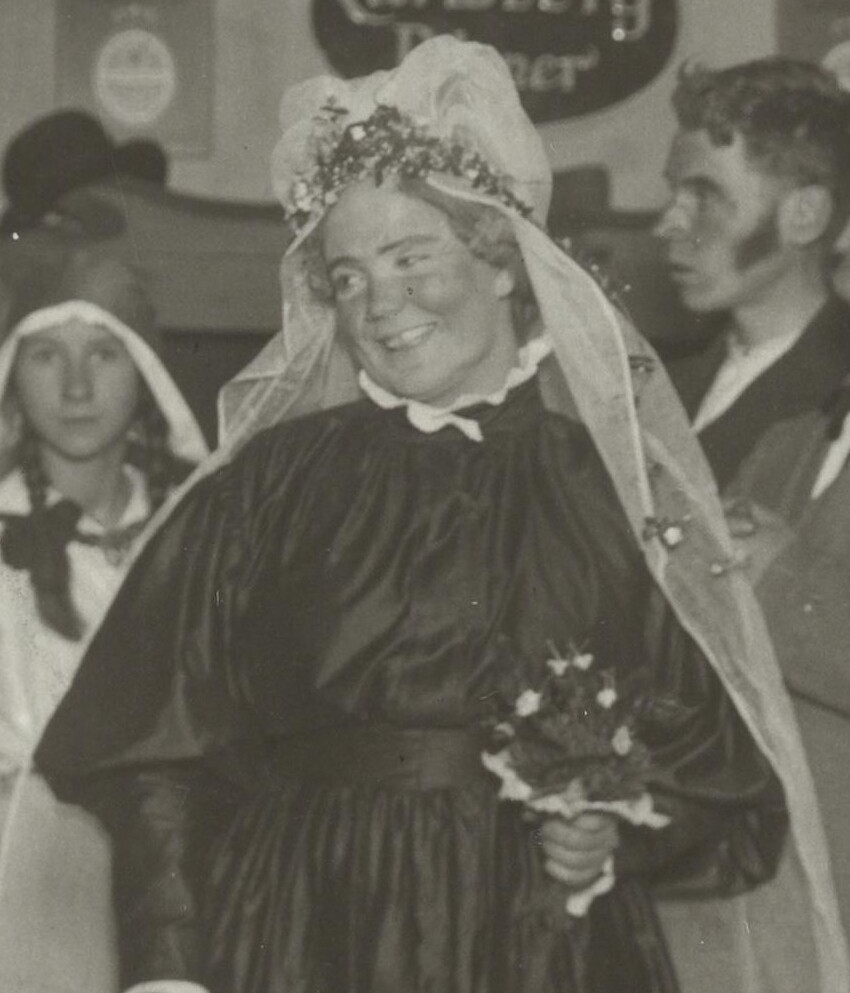
- Johanne Bruhn in Bolettes bryllupsferd in 1916
- Born: Johanne Rosendahl; 8 May 1890; Christiania, Norway
- Died: 24 December 1921 (aged 31)
- Other names: Johanne Bruhn-Johnsen
- Years active: 1909–1921
- Relatives: Astrid Sommer (sister)

Johanne Bruhn-Johnsen (8 May 1890 – 24 December 1921) was a Norwegian actress and was one of the leading actors at Det Norske Teatret.

== Early life and career ==
Johanne Rosendahl was born on 8 May 1890 in Christiania. She was the older sister of actress Astrid Sommer.

In 1909, Bruhn made her acting debut as Helga in Geografi og Kærlighed, then toured Denmark with the Bjørnson tour. Subsequently, she worked with the Olaus Olsens Selskap. Afterwards, she was engaged by Det Norske Teatret, where she had success as Neger-Gurina in Ungen. Bruhn also appeared in Lars Anders og Jan Anders at the same theatre in 1914. For two seasons, from 1914 to 1916, she was engaged at Trondhjems Teater, but later returned to Det Norske Teatret.

She had a small role as Øl-Ane in Oskar Braaten's Stor-Anders. Bruhn also had a small role in Eli Sjo by Olav Hoprekstad. She also appeared in another Hoprekstad play, Bjørgedal, in November 1919, where she was praised for her role as Mildred Bjørge. One of her most popular roles was in Brødrene Østermanns Huskors, which she performed over 300 times. Bruhn portrayed Haldor's mother in Fante-Anne, the first film to be directed by a Norwegian in Norway based on a Norwegian and the first to feature professional actors.

One of her last acting roles before her death was in Ludwig Thoma's Magdalena in March 1921.

== Personal life and death ==
Her first marriage was to Trondheim actor Birger Bruhn. They had a daughter, Anne Marie Bruhn. Bruhn married for the second time in 1921 to journalist and editor Erling Johnsen, and later that same year, in December 1921, their son Helge Støp Johnsen was born.

Bruhn died on 24 December 1921 at the age of 31 from puerperal fever due to the birth of their son.
