= Dagmar Myhrvold =

Norwegian actress (1898–1972)

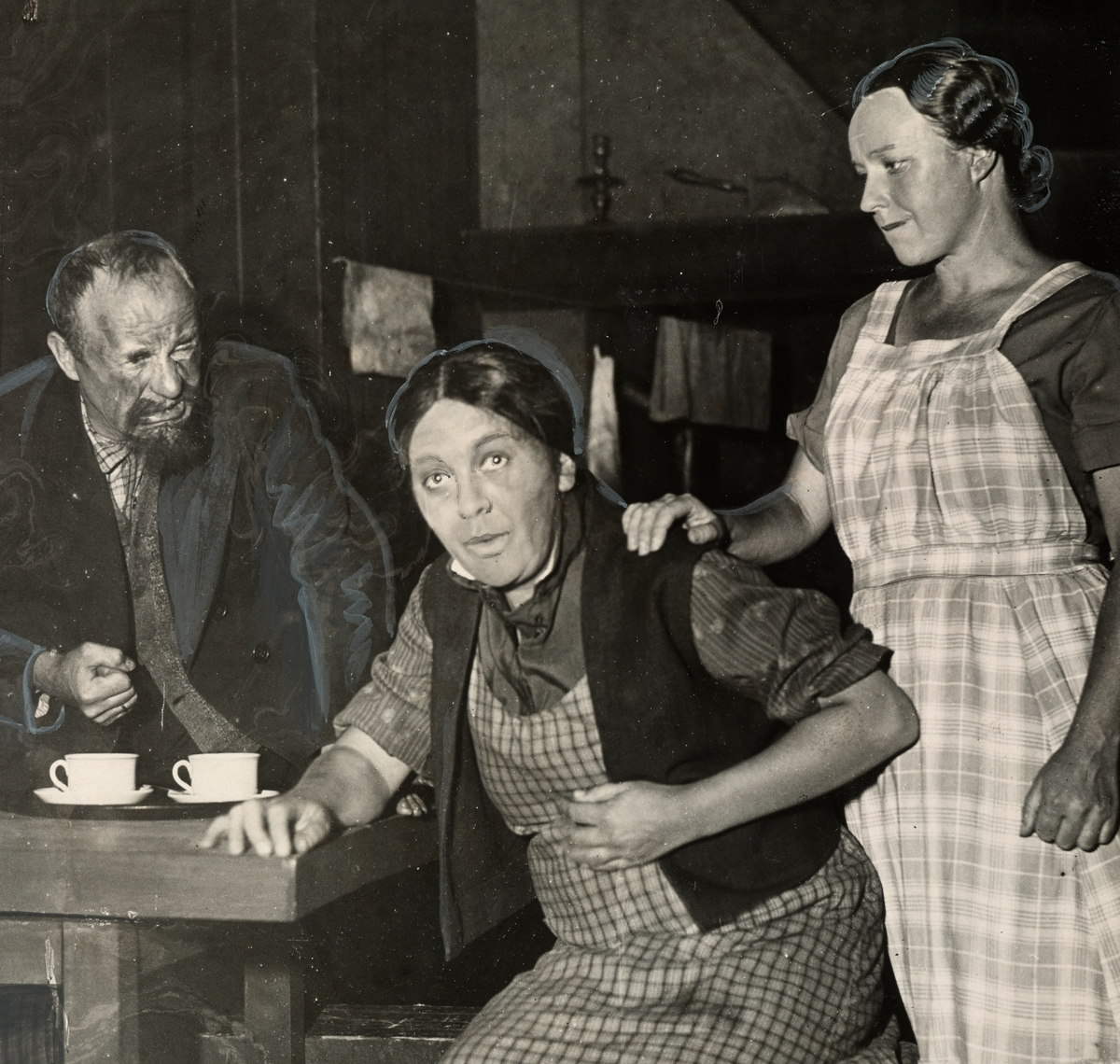
- Scene from Medmenneske (1937) at the Norwegian Theater. Dagmar Myhrvold is in the center.
- Born: April 19, 1898; Kristiania (now Oslo), Norway
- Died: April 21, 1972 (aged 74)
- Occupation: Actress
- Spouse(s): Vilhelm Lund; Nils Sletbak

Dagmar Myhrvold (April 19, 1898 – April 21, 1972) was a Norwegian actress.

After attending Sofie Bernhoft's school, Myhrvold spent a year studying theater in Copenhagen. In 1916 she was able to make her debut as a participant in Edvard Drabløs's touring theater. The following year there was a tour with The Dance of Death by August Strindberg, in which she played two roles, was responsible for the music, and played violin.

From 1919 onward she was engaged with the Norwegian Theater. Already as a young woman, Myhrvold often played older women, whom she portrayed with weight and credibility, including the mothers in Leo Tolstoy's The Power of Darkness and Selma Lagerlöf's The Emperor of Portugallia as well as Tale in Olav Duun's Medmenneske (Fellow Man). With a broad sense of humor, she also played genuine Oslo types such as Gurina-Neger in Oskar Braaten's Ungen (The Child) and Dobbelt-Petra in the same author's Den store barnedåpen (The Great Christening). Myhrvold also worked as a stage director, and she directed twelve works.

Myhrvold was a teacher at the Norwegian Theater's student school, which she led from 1947 to 1949. She also worked to establish the National Academy of Theatre (Norwegian: Statens teaterhøgskole), which opened in 1953 and where she taught for a few years.

Myhrvold was married to the actor Vilhelm Lund in the 1920s. Their daughter Anne-Marie (born 1929) was married to the French sinologist André Lévy (1925–2017), and in 1968 she published the travelogue Ferden til Shigaraki (Journey to Shigaraki). In 1935 Myhrvold married the theater director Nils Sletbak.

== Filmography ==
- 1920: Fante-Anne as Anne's mother
- 1926: Brudeferden i Hardanger as Kari Bjørve
- 1934: Sangen om Rondane as Kari, Knut's mother
- 1937: Bra mennesker as Andrine Vik
- 1940: Godvakker-Maren as Matea
- 1942: En herre med bart as Thea, Grong's maid
- 1943: Vigdis as the midwife
- 1946: Om kjærligheten synger de as Mrs. Larsen
- 1964: Nydelige nelliker as Maja's friend
- 1968: Smuglere
- 1969: Brent jord as Herdis's grandmother
- 1970: Selma Brøter (TV)
