= Lars Tvinde =

Norwegian actor

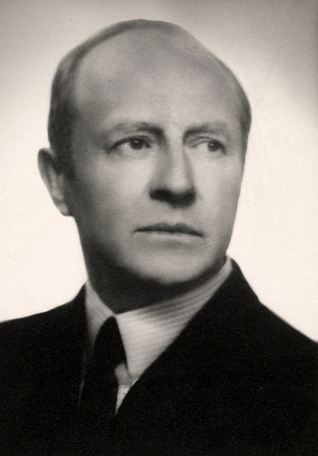
- Lars Tvinde, 1930
- Born: 11 September 1886; Voss Municipality, Norway
- Died: 25 June 1973 (aged 86)
- Occupation: Actor
- Awards: Norwegian Theatre Critics Award (1939); Order of St. Olav (1964)

Lars Tvinde (11 September 1886 – 25 June 1973) was a Norwegian stage and film actor.

== Biography ==
Tvinde was born in Voss Municipality in Søndre Bergenhus, Norway. He was the son of Knut Haldorsen (1843–1927) and Eli Jørgensdotter Leidal (1842–1927). He attended Voss folkehøgskule and for eight years, he worked for his uncle at a store in Vossevangen. He also appeared at amateur theater in Bergen.

He started working for Det Norske Teatret in Oslo during 1912. He said the first lines at the theatre's opening performance, Ivar Aasen's Ervingen, on 2 January 1913. He is regarded as one of the driving forces at Det Norske Teatret, from its first season until his retirement in 1958. During his time on stage, he created memorable characters in both comic and the tragic roles.

He also had a number of roles in film. He made his film debut in 1920 as Haldor in Fante-Anne directed by Rasmus Breistein. He played in Himmeluret (1925), Bra mennesker (1937) and Godvakker-Maren (1940). Tvinde was a board member of the Norwegian Acting Federation 1932-39.

He was awarded the Hulda Garborgs stipend in 1926 and the Norwegian Theatre Critics Award (Teaterkritikerprisen) in 1939 and awarded the State artist grant (Statens kunstnarløn) in 1955. Tvinde was decorated Commander of the Royal Norwegian Order of St. Olav in 1964.

== Personal life ==
In 1923 he married Gudrun Friedricksen (1894–1982).

== Filmography ==
Year	Title	Role	Notes
1920	Fante-Anne	Haldor, hennes sønn	
1921	Jomfru Trofast	Killingland, lensmann	
1921	Felix	Carl Jensinius, Presten	
1925	Himmeluret	Lars Timiansbakken	
1937	Bra mennesker	Egeland, lærer	
1937	Fant	Sebaldus	
1937	By og land hand i hand	Nils Tveit, vestlandsbonde	
1938	Bør Børson Jr.	Anders Torsøien	
1939	Gjest Baardsen	Lensmann	
1942	Trysil-Knut	Torgal Skaret	
1943	Vigdis	Jens Bjørkli, lærer og kirkesanger	
1946	Om kjærligheten synger de		
1951	Ukjent mann	Hestehandleren	
1966	Hunger		
1969	An-Magritt	Kiempen	

== Other sources ==
- Dalgard, Olav (1966) Lars Tvinde (Oslo : Noregs boklag)
