= Kristine Valdresdatter (film) =

1930 film

- Directed by: Rasmus Breistein
- Written by: Rasmus Breistein
- Based on: Kristine: En fortælling fra Valdres, by Hans Andersen Foss
- Starring: Aase Bye; Rasmus Rasmussen; Tore Foss; Sigurd Eldegard; Hjalmar Fries; Signe Johansen; Per Haldor; Emma Juel
- Cinematography: Gunnar Nilsen-Vig
- Music by: Adolf Kristoffer Nielsen
- Release date: 1930
- Running time: 93 minutes
- Country: Norway
- Language: Norwegian

Kristine Valdresdatter is a Norwegian silent film from 1930. This was the last silent film produced in Norway and it was directed by Rasmus Breistein. Breistein also wrote the script, which was based on Hans Andersen Foss's novel Kristine: En fortælling fra Valdres (Kristine: A Tale from Valdres). The film premiered on 26 December 1930 and it has been aired several times by NRK.

== Plot ==
Every year, Lord Wakefield comes to Vang Municipality in the Valdres district to go fishing on the lakes. He stays at the Solbjør farm, which is owned by the bailiff Erik Solbjør. There the lord meets the beautiful Anne and falls in love with her. The next spring she gives birth to a daughter. In despair, Anne places the child on the steps of the Solbjør farm and then drowns herself in a lake.

Erik cares for the girl and raises her as his own. He names her Kristine Valdresdatter (i.e., Kristine, daughter of Valdres). As she grows up, Kristine falls in love with her schoolmate Harald. In adulthood, Harald becomes difficult to deal with, prone to drinking and fighting. Kristine tries to change his behavior without success. Harald is also an accomplished fiddler, and he goes on the road to perform. Kristine travels to England with Lord Wakefield, where her beautiful singing voice develops. The lord's great dream is to hear her sing at Vang Church. However, Kristine and Harald cannot forget each other, and they start exchanging letters. Harald writes that he has stopped drinking, and one summer they meet again at the home in Vang. Lord Wakefield is also there. He is seriously ill, and on his deathbed he reveals to Kristine that he is her father and that he has made her his heiress.

== Cast ==
- Aase Bye: Kristine
- Tore Foss: Harald Bergli
- Rasmus Rasmussen: Erik Solbjør, the bailiff
- Harald Schwenzen: Lord Wakefield
- Kristian Aamodt: Anton Møller
- Carl Hagerup Aspevold: Ola Vik ("Storeviken"), the local historian
- Sigurd Eldegard: Peder Bergli
- Per Haldor: Harald as a child
- Signe Johansen: Kristine as a child
- Emma Juel: Erik Solbjør's wife
- Ole Leikvang: the schoolmaster
- Peter Leirah: the priest
- Tora Leirah: the priest's wife
- Helga Balle Lund: Anne, the milkmaid
- Mildred Mehle: a farm girl
- Signe Ramberg: Kari Fjellstugu
- Ørnulf Øiseth: Tolleif, a farm boy
