= Drabløs =

Drabløs is a Norwegian language habitational surname. Notable people with the name include:

- Edvard Drabløs (1883–1976), Norwegian actor and theatre director
- Thomas Drabløs (born 1984), Norwegian musician and drummer
