= Hjalmar Fries =

Norwegian actor and theater director

- Born: April 16, 1891; Kristiania, Norway
- Died: December 14, 1973 (aged 82)
- Occupation: Actor
- Years active: 1922–1966
- Children: Gretelill Fries
- Relatives: Harald Schwenzen, Per Schwenzen

Hjalmar Fries Schwenzen (April 16, 1891 – December 14, 1973) was a Norwegian actor and theater director. He had his film debut in Pan in 1922.

As Hjalmar Fries Schwenzen he worked as a war correspondent for the Oslo based Tidens Tegn in Macedonia, Greece, during the First Balkan War (1912–13).

Fries was employed at the National Theater in the 1920s, and he was the theater director at the Oslo New Theater from 1934 to 1935.

Hjalmar Fries was the brother of the actor Harald Schwenzen and screenwriter Per Schwenzen, and the father of the actress Gretelill Fries.

== Filmography ==
- 1922: Pan
- 1924: Til sæters
- 1925: Himmeluret
- 1930: Kristine Valdresdatter
- 1931: Den store barnedåpen
- 1953: Den evige Eva
- 1953: Selkvinnen
- 1954: Heksenetter
- 1966: Nederlaget (TV)
