= Arild Arnardo =

Norwegian circus director (1942–2020)

- Born: January 16, 1942
- Died: November 16, 2020 (aged 78); Lillesand Municipality, Norway
- Occupation: Circus director
- Children: Are Arnardo
- Father: Arne Arnardo

Arild Otto Arnardo (January 16, 1942 – November 16, 2020) was a Norwegian circus director. He was the son of the circus director Arne Arnardo. After his father's death in 1995, he became the director of Norway's oldest circus, Cirkus Arnardo. In his younger days, he also performed as a tightrope walker.

== Career ==
On tours around Norway during the summer, Arild Arnardo brought with him his wife Bjørg Helene, his daughter the "circus princess" Helen, and his son Are. In 1991, the Arnardo family moved to Lillesand Municipality. In the 1990s, Arild Arnardo had plans to establish a Cirkusland (Circus Land) located in Lillesand. The project was shelved in 1997.

In 2015, Arnardo and his wife Bjørg were awarded the King's Medal of Merit.

== Filmography ==
- 1973: To fluer i ett smekk as the trainer
- 2008: Cirkusliv (TV series) as himself (circus director)
- 2012: Lindmo (TV series) as himself (guest)
