= Aasta Nielsen =

Norwegian actress (1897–1975)

- Aasta Nielsen in Fante-Anne (1920)
- Born: September 29, 1897; Kristiania (now Oslo), Norway
- Died: October 24, 1975 (aged 78); Oslo, Norway
- Occupation: Actress

Aasta Nielsen (September 29, 1897 – October 24, 1975) was a Norwegian actress.

Nielsen was born in Kristiania (now Oslo), Norway and was a first cousin of the Wagnerian soprano Kirsten Flagstad. She debuted as a theater actress in 1915 and appeared at the Norwegian Theater, the Casino Opera Theater, the Mayol Theater, the Central Theater, and the Stavanger Permanent Theater.

She retired from acting in 1933.

== Filmography ==
- 1920: Fante-Anne as Anne ("Fante-Anne")
- 1921: Jomfru Trofast as Tone (Miss Faithful)
- 1921: Felix as Zazako, Felix's sister
