= Gustav Aagaard =

Norwegian writer and priest

- Born: September 18, 1852; Sandefjord, Sweden-Norway
- Died: January 16, 1927 (aged 74)
- Occupations: Priest, writer

Carl Gustav Oskar Aagaard (September 18, 1852 – January 16, 1927) was a Norwegian writer and priest. His stories were primarily of a religious nature, but he also published later stories that were generally entertaining, but with a strongly emphasized moralizing tendency. He is also known for his hymns.

Gustav Aagaard was the brother of the author Oscar Aagaard (1855–1936).

== Works ==
- Fra tusmørketimerne (From the Twilight Hours, 1892)
- Sjøluft: billeder i digt (Sea Air: Pictures in Poetry, 1893)
- Min solstraale: fortælling (My Sunbeam: A Story, 1895)
- Speilbilleder: en fortælling (Mirror Images: A Story, 1896)
- Sterke hænder (Strong Hands, 1897)
- En spøgelseshistorie (A Ghost Story, 1899)
- I skygger og lys (In Shadows and Light, 1900)
- Keiser Felix: fortælling (Emperor Felix: A Story, 1904)
- Til min kjære: nogen av mine digte og sange: til minde (To My Love: Some of my Poems and Songs: In Memory, 1921)

== Filmography ==
- 1921 Felix
