= Det store varpet =

- Directed by: Nils R. Müller
- Written by: Odd Berset; Nils R. Müller
- Starring: Finn Bernhoft; Per Christensen; Jack Fjeldstad
- Release date: 1961
- Running time: 103 minutes
- Country: Norway
- Language: Norwegian

Det store varpet (English: The Big Hoard) is a 1961 Norwegian drama film directed by Nils R. Müller, starring Finn Bernhoft, Per Christensen and Jack Fjeldstad. The film is about two brothers who are working as fishermen with their father. It was entered into the 2nd Moscow International Film Festival.

== Cast ==
- Finn Bernhoft
- Per Christensen as Ola
- Jack Fjeldstad
- Egil Lorck
- Alfred Maurstad as Rederen Elias
- Ragnhild Michelsen
- Bjarne Skarbøvik
- Tor Stokke
- Rolf Søder
- Bjørg Vatle as Birgit
- Kåre Wicklund
- Ottar Wicklund
