= Gretelill Fries =

Norwegian actress (1923–1977)

- Born: Margrethe Fries; August 18, 1923; Bergen, Norway
- Died: June 7, 1977 (aged 53); Oslo, Norway
- Occupation: Actress
- Spouse: Øistein Børke (1943–1949)

Gretelill Fries (born Margrethe Fries, August 18, 1923 – June 7, 1977) was a Norwegian stage and film actress.

== Family ==
Fries was born in Bergen, the daughter of the actor and theater manager Hjalmar Fries. She was the niece of the actor Harald Schwenzen and screenwriter Per Schwenzen. She was married to the actor Øistein Børke from 1943 to 1949. She later remarried and was known as Gretelill Fries Kavli.

== Career ==
Fries debuted at the Rogaland Theater in 1947. She was engaged with the National Theater in Oslo from 1952 to 1954, and she also performed at the New Theater and People's Theater. Fries most often played young women, and her most noted role was as the maid Mirza in Christian Friedrich Hebbel's Judith in 1954.

She appeared in Leif Sinding's film Gylne ungdom in 1956. In the late 1950s, Fries ended her acting career and retired to private life.

== Filmography ==
- 1956: Gylne ungdom as Constance, Sommervoll's wife
