= Mathilde Nielsen (Norwegian actress) =

Norwegian stage actress (1853–?)

- Born: July 15, 1853; Bergen, Norway
- Occupation: Actress
- Relatives: Elly Kjølstad, Snefrid Aukland

Mathilde Regine Nielsen (July 15, 1853 – ?) was a Norwegian actress.

== Family ==
Mathilde Nielsen was born in Bergen, the daughter of the journeyman Niels Christian Nielsen and Marte Elisabeth Olsen (Larsen). She was the sister of the actress Elly Kjølstad and the aunt of the actress Snefrid Aukland (a.k.a. Erika Warnecke). She married Gunnar Olsen Alvorn in 1891.

== Career ==
Mathilde Nielsen was a pupil of the Danish theater director Frederik Adolph Cetti in her hometown of Bergen. She followed Cetti in the 1870–1871 season in Bergen and Trondheim. In the 1880s, Nielsen was a member of the theater association of the East Kristiania Labor Union (Norwegian: Kristiania østre Arbeidersamfund).

== Selected roles ==
- 1870: the bailiff's wife in Henrik Anker Bjerregaard's Fjeldeventyret
- 1870: Agnes in Henrik Ibsen's Brand
