= Trysil-Knut =

1942 film

- Directed by: Rasmus Breistein
- Written by: Rasmus Breistein; Halvor Floden
- Based on: a novel by Rudolf Muus
- Starring: Alfred Maurstad; Eva Sletto; Karl Holter; Lars Tvinde; Ola Isene; Lydia Opøien; Jørn Ording; Bjarne Bø
- Cinematography: Ottar Gladtvet; Kåre Bergstrøm; Gunnar Nilsen-Vig; Ulf Greber
- Distributed by: Triangelfilm
- Release date: April 30, 1942
- Running time: 93 minutes
- Country: Norway
- Language: Norwegian

Trysil-Knut is a Norwegian film from 1942. Rasmus Breistein directed this skiing melodrama during the German occupation of Norway. It tells the story of the legendary skier Knut from Trysil, an ardent patriot at the beginning of the 1800s who uses his skiing skills to prevent war from breaking out between Norway and Sweden. Knut also wins back his "princess" and a property that he was cheated out of.

Like many of the Norwegian films from the interwar period or the occupation years, this is an adventure story. Breistein's point of departure for the story was a popular novel by Rudolf Muus from 1914, and he was also inspired by Bernt Lund's poem from 1861 and by Ole Haugen-Flermoe's story from 1909.

== Cast ==
- Alfred Maurstad as Knut Skaret ("Trysil-Knut")
- Eva Sletto as Åse
- Karl Holter as Ole Kynsberg
- Lars Tvinde as Torgal Skaret
- Ola Isene as Smith the priest
- Aud Egede-Nissen as the priest's wife
- Henny Skjønberg as Gjartrud Skaret
- Thomas Thomassen as Auden Løkja
- Jørn Ording as his son
- Tryggve Larssen as Pyran
- Sigurd Magnussøn as the bailiff
- Edvard Drabløs as Pål Skolemester
- Berit Brænne as Gari, Pyran's daughter
- Alfred Solaas as the bailiff's servant
- Martin Gisti as Silver-Jan, a Swedish peddler
- Einar Vaage as Crown the attorney
- Sofie Bernhoft as Olga Liplassen
- David Knudsen as the general
- Joachim Holst-Jensen as Anneus Phil, an intendant
- Theodor Berge as the judge
- Gösta Cederlund as the chancellor
- Knut Jacobsen as an adjutant
- Carl Hultman as the headwaiter
- Emmy Worm-Müller as an old woman
- Lydia Opøien as a servant girl
- Astrid Sommer as an old woman
- Bjarne Bø as a courier
- Kolbjørn Brenda as a farm boy
- Toralv Maurstad
- Haakon Arnold as a raftsman
- Harald Heide Steen
- Kristian Hefte as a raftsman
- Oscar Egede-Nissen as a raftsman
- Olga Sjøgren a servant girl at the Kynsberg house
- Snefrid Aukland as a woman
