= Tirich Mir til topps =

1952 film

- Directed by: Rasmus Breistein
- Written by: Reidar Lunde
- Produced by: Rasmus Breistein
- Starring: Rasmus Breistein; Arild Nybakken; Arne Næss
- Cinematography: Rasmus Breistein; Henry Berg; Arild Nybakken
- Edited by: Rasmus Breistein
- Distributed by: Kommunenes filmcentral
- Release date: August 25, 1952
- Running time: 86 minutes
- Country: Norway
- Language: Norwegian

Tirich Mir til topps (To the Top of Tirich Mir) is a Norwegian documentary film directed by Rasmus Breistein. It describes an expedition to the 7,769-meter (25,489 ft) peak Tirich Mir in the Hindu Kush in northern Pakistan in 1950. The summit was reached by a Norwegian-British expedition consisting of Arne Næss, P. Kvernberg, H. Berg, and Tony Streather, on July 23, and it was the fourth-highest ascent ever. The expedition, which started from Pakistan, was initiated by Arne Næss. The film premiered on August 25, 1952.

The film was recorded as 16 mm film, and for screening in cinemas it was copied to 35 mm.
