= Kristian Hefte =

Norwegian actor

- Born: April 28, 1905; Ål, Norway
- Died: February 24, 1977 (aged 71)
- Occupation: Actor

Kristian Hefte (April 28, 1905 – February 24, 1977) was a Norwegian actor.

Hefte made his stage debut in 1929 at the Falkberget Theater as Fredrik in the play Bør Børson Jr. For more than thirty years, he was a driving force at the Trøndelag Theater, where he played such diverse roles as Celius in Nils Kjær's Det lykkelige valg, Didrik in Olav Duun's Medmenneske, and Firs in Anton Chekhov's The Cherry Orchard.

Hefte received the King's Medal of Merit in gold in 1975.

== Filmography ==
- 1932: Skjærgårdsflirt as Erik Østerman, Østerman's son
- 1938: Bør Børson Jr. as Nils Tollvollen
- 1939: De vergeløse as the sheriff's officer
- 1940: Bastard as Vasily's Russian friend
- 1941: Den forsvundne pølsemaker as the butcher's friend Rudolf Jensen
- 1942: Trysil-Knut as a raftsman
