= Tom Tellefsen =

Norwegian actor

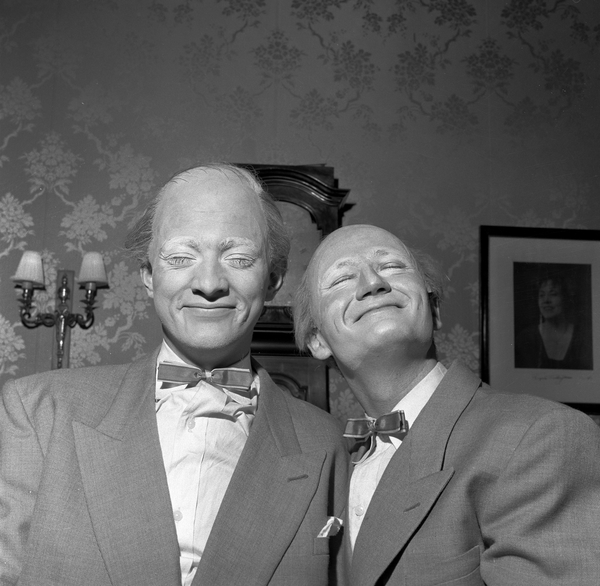
- Johnny Bergh and Tom Tellefsen, 1958
- Born: 30 October 1931; Asker, Norway
- Died: 17 January 2012 (aged 80)
- Occupation: Actor
- Spouse: Rut Tellefsen

Tom Tellefsen (30 October 1931 – 17 January 2012) was a Norwegian actor. He was born in Asker. He was married to actress Rut Tellefsen from 1955 to 1962. He made his film debut in 1949, in Arne Skouen's Gategutter, and also played in Circus Fandango from 1954 and Blodveien from 1955. His stage debut was at Det Norske Teatret in 1959, and he worked at this theatre until his retirement in 2001. Among his later films are Smuglere from 1968, Balladen om mestertyven Ole Høiland from 1970, Bør Børson Jr. and Kimen from 1974 and Hard asfalt from 1986. He also contributed to television and radio.
