= Jorden rundt på to timer =

1949 film

- Directed by: Rasmus Breistein
- Produced by: Rasmus Breistein
- Cinematography: Rasmus Breistein; Arild Nybakken
- Edited by: Rasmus Breistein; Olav Engebretsen
- Distributed by: Triangelfilm
- Release date: November 10, 1949
- Running time: 105 minutes
- Country: Norway
- Language: Norwegian

Jorden rundt på to timer (Around the World in Two Hours) is a documentary film from 1949 directed by Rasmus Breistein. He traveled the world with the photographer Arild Nybakken and put the clips together into a full-length feature film. The film was edited by Rasmus Breistein and Olav Engebretsen.

This was the first full-length color film made in Norway. The film has a running time of 105 minutes.
