= Snefrid Aukland =

Norwegian actress (1884–1977)

- Snefrid Aukland in the film Velké křtiny (1931)
- Born: October 5, 1884; Kristiania (now Oslo), Norway
- Died: January 14, 1977 (aged 92)
- Occupation: Actress
- Mother: Elly Kjølstad
- Relatives: Mathilde Nielsen

Snefrid Erika Aukland (née Kjølstad, October 5, 1884 – January 14, 1977) was a Norwegian actress.

== Family ==
Snefrid Aukland was the daughter of the orthopedist and lawyer Thorvald Nils Gotfrid Essendrop Kjølstad (1832–1910) and the actress Elly Kjølstad (1850–1930). She was the niece of the actress Mathilde Nielsen. She was married to the engineer Ernst Bernhard Aukland (1894–1969). She also performed under the names Erika Warnecke and Snefrid Warnecke.

== Acting career ==
Snefrid Aukland took part in the National Touring Theater (Norwegian: Nationalturnéen), a troupe led by the theater manager Ludovica Levy, from 1907 to 1911. From 1913 to 1917, she worked at the Norwegian Theater. In 1917, she sailed on SS Bergensfjord to New York City to seek her fortune. At the time, she was registered as an extra living in Kongsberg. She later returned to Norway. In the fall of 1931 she took part in the Chat Noir revue, under the direction of Victor Bernau, and in the 1930s she was on several tours with Bjørn Bjørnevik's theatre, where she performed in the plays Augustas lille feiltrinn (1935) and No'n er gifte – og andre har det godt (1939).

Aukland appeared in several Norwegian films. She made her film debut in 1928 in Ragnar Westfelt's Viddenes folk, and she also appeared in the first Norwegian sound film, Den store barnedåpen, in 1931.

For many years, Aukland was a prompter and a prop assistant at the National Theater in Oslo, where she was nicknamed Føyka.

== Modeling ==
Snefrid Aukland was one of the first models for the painter Henrik Sørensen, and she is portrayed, among other works, in his painting Artister (Performers) in the Rasmus Meyer art collection in Bergen.

== Selected theater roles ==
- The old hag in Tyrihans by Hulda Garborg (Norwegian Theater, 1914)
- Krestna in Ungen by Oskar Braaten (Norwegian Theater, 1915)
- Anna in Per Olsen og Kjerringa hans (Outdoor Theater at Bygdøy, 1926)
- Mrs. Vom in the children's comedy Knold og Tot by Knut Hergel (Oslo Theater, 1927)
- Augusta in Augustas lilla felsteg (Norwegian title: Augustas lille feiltrinn) by Siegfried Fischer (Bjørnevik Theater, 1935)

== Filmography ==
- 1928: Viddenes folk as a sorceress
- 1931: Den store barnedåpen as a woman
- 1942: Trysil-Knut as an old woman
- 1944: Ti gutter og en gjente as a hoarder
- 1951: Storfolk og småfolk as a woman in the village
