= Gullfjellet (film) =

- Directed by: Rasmus Breistein; Titus Vibe-Müller
- Written by: Rasmus Breistein
- Based on: Ove Ansteinsson's comedy Guldfjeldet
- Produced by: Titus Vibe-Müller
- Starring: Karl Holter; Tove Bryn; Eva Sletto; Ragnhild Hald; Jens Gunderssen; Martin Gisti; Toralf Sandø; Ottar Wicklund; Øistein Børke; Bjarne Bø
- Cinematography: Kåre Bergstrøm; Ulf Greber; Per G. Jonson
- Edited by: Titus Vibe-Müller
- Music by: Adolf Kristoffer Nielsen
- Distributed by: Norsk Film A/S
- Release date: April 14, 1941
- Running time: 92 minutes
- Country: Norway
- Language: Norwegian

Gullfjellet (Gold Mountain) is a Norwegian film from 1941 based on Guldfjeldet, a comedy by Ove Ansteinsson about farmers tempted to invest all their money in a gold bonanza. The film was directed by Rasmus Breistein and Titus Vibe-Müller.

== Plot ==
The city boy Rolf Rønne arrives at Benningstad, a large farm in Hedemark, and gets to work. He meets Jørgen Krullerstugun and lies that he has found gold at Kråkberget, which is on Hans Benningstad's property. Jørgen makes his own investigations at Kråkberget and finds mica and mistakes it for gold. At night, he brings home large quantities of the stone and fills his living room and bedrooms. As rumors spread, purchasing bids start pouring in. The landowner does not want to sell, but he gives up when the gold find is announced in the newspapers. The bank manager and lawyer want to form a company with the village. Hans Benningstad becomes the director general and is now living the good life. Gold fever spreads, and several farmers sell their farms to buy gold mining shares. The village celebrates while the grain rots. Karl Kanten goes to Oslo to sell the gold to the bank, but he is told that it is only gray stone. The news shatters the celebratory mood at Benningstad when he returns the next day. The bank has to foreclose, and several farmers go bankrupt. Eventually, the farmers have to start farming again.

== Reception ==
Aftenposten wrote that the film had many bright spots, but that the script was too weak. "There are many good things in Gullfjellet; the lines often contradict each other as they may in an active film, the camera moves too quickly, and in many places one has the feeling that the will to make a fresh film was present more than in others. But they were too indulgent toward the screenplay writer and did not cut enough ...."

== Cast ==
- Karl Holter as Hans Benningstad
- Tove Bryn as Olaug Benningstad
- Eva Sletto as Randi, their daughter
- Jens Gunderssen as Rolf Rønne
- Ragnhild Hald as Olea
- Martin Gisti as Jørgen Krullerstugun
- Toralf Sandø as Karl Kanten
- Ottar Wicklund as Nils Røst
- Øistein Børke as Lars Heksvold
- Bjarne Bø as Amund Hageløkka
- Finn Bernhoft as Jon
- Edvard Drabløs as a farmer
- Sigurd Eldegard as a farmer
- Leif Enger as Larsen
- Gustav Fernslew as Sjur Bjelke
- Erling Hanson as the bank director in Oslo
- Johan Hauge as the magistrate
- Joachim Holst-Jensen as Mekkel the gypsy
- Jens Holstad as Mons Listerud
- Leif Juster as the janitor at the bank
- Sigurd Magnussøn as the chairman
- Lisbet Nyborg as Berte Kanten
- Harald Ottho as Arve Benningstad
- Thorleif Reiss as Pettersen
- Amund Rydland as Hol, a farmer
- Folkmann Schaanning as the professor
- Henny Skjønberg as Matja Krullerstugun
- Harald Steen as the bank manager in Hamar
- Einar Vaage as Halvor
- Liv Bredal as an office lady
- Karlot Engen as a clerk (not credited)
- Georg Nordahl as a cashier (not credited)
