= Birger Løvaas =

Norwegian actor

- Born: November 24, 1901
- Died: June 5, 1977 (aged 75)
- Resting place: Vestre gravlund
- Occupation: Actor

Birger Løvaas (November 24, 1901 – June 5, 1977) was a Norwegian actor and comedian.

Løvaas played Karl Anton over 2,000 times in Gideon Wahlberg's play Skjærgårdsflirt from 1928 to 1944, and he traveled throughout Norway with his theater. Skjærgårdsflirt was the most frequently viewed play of the twentieth century in Norway. Løvaas also played Karl Anton in the film version of Skjærgårdsflirt in 1932.

After the Second World War, Løvaas was engaged with both the People's Theater and the Oslo New Theater. He also appeared in the radio play Dickie Dick Dickens.

== Filmography ==
- 1932: Prinsessen som ingen kunne målbinde as the suitor
- 1932: Skjærgårdsflirt as Karl Anton
- 1958: Bustenskjold as Bernt Skomaker
- 1963: Freske fraspark as Martin
- 1964: Marenco as Askild
- 1965: Stompa forelsker seg as the police officer
- 1968: Smuglere
- 1969: Olsen-banden as the station attendant
- 1970: Olsenbanden og Dynamitt-Harry as the maintenance inspector
- 1973: To fluer i ett smekk as the station master
