= Signe Ramberg =

Norwegian actress (1900–1987)

- Born: November 4, 1900; Eidanger Municipality, Norway
- Died: January 15, 1987 (aged 86)
- Resting place: Eidanger Church, Norway
- Occupation: Actress

Signe Ramberg (November 4, 1900 – January 15, 1987) was a Norwegian actress.

== Life ==
Signe Ramberg was born in Eidanger Municipality, Norway. She performed as a stage actress at the New Theater from 1929 to 1944, and she also appeared in five film roles between 1930 and 1944. Ramberg died in 1987 and is buried in the Old Eidanger Cemetery in Eidanger.

== Filmography ==
- 1930: Kristine Valdresdatter as Kari Fjelstugu
- 1931: Den store barnedåpen as Toralfa
- 1937: To levende og en død as a guest at the hostel
- 1938: Ungen as Olina
- 1944: Brudekronen as Tallak's mother
