= Rudolf Muus =

Norwegian writer

Rudolf Muus (February 19, 1862 – November 9, 1935) was a Norwegian writer of popular literature.

== Biography ==
Rudolf Wilhelm Muus was born at Aker in Akershus, Norway. He was the son of Abraham Falch Muus, and his grandfather was Isach Muus, the owner of Åsen and Ullevål farms. Rudolf grew up at Åsen farm, close to the working class districts of Sagene and Torshov. The site now used by Ragna Ringdals Dagsenter, a non-profit center for the mentally disabled in Oslo.

He started writing at about the age of six, and at school he was given 50 øre for each essay he wrote for his classmates. When he was about 7–8 years old, he was the theatre director for Aasen Theater and instructed young actors in little plays he had written himself. At the age of 12, he finished off a book on fairy tales, but it was never published. In 1881 he completed the examen artium (the entrance examination required for acceptance to university level studies) in one year, and after further studies at the University of Oslo he earned the title of Cand. Philos.

Muus was married to Olga Erikka Jørgine, with whom he had ten children. His wife a musician and had performed at Kristiania Theater. Their home became a meeting place for artists and musicians. Muus enjoyed outdoor life, and particularly picked up an interest in fishing and picking mushrooms.

== Literary work ==
Muus wrote about 50 novels, many of them very long, with a total of 286 publications. Many of these were crime fiction characterized by chase scenes and some light romance. In many of his stories, the plot took place in Kristiania (the former name of Oslo). Many of Muus’ stories were descriptions of city environments long gone from the present city of Oslo. In addition he also translated several German and English novels.

Muus’ first published work was printed in Morgenbladet in 1881, under the title En myr. According to Muus this was a “poetic-political idyll”, where he compares certain political conditions with moss swamps. His first fictional work that was publicly well-known was the comedy Ole Høiland, which was written in 1883 and performed the same year at Møllergatens Theater. The following year he wrote the story Smedens datter, which was published under the name “R.M”. Later came Kongemordet i Bergen and Svenskene på Norderhov, under the pseudonym Rollo. In 1885 he started writing Kristiania novels, the first one being Gardistens kjæreste.

In addition to Kristiania novels Muus later on wrote crime fiction and stories about rural districts. Muus was interested in Norwegian history, and studied the topic throughout his life. On his 25th anniversary as a writer, he stated that the historical stories Ravn den fredløse and Olaf Trygvessøn were his favourites in his writing career up till that point. Muus also wrote cookbooks and a sex education book under the name “Professor J. Souris”. Throughout his career he wrote under some 40 different names, including Sigmund Tofte, Bjørn Farmann, Gaston Ring, Rolf Ragnvaldsøn, Herman Brage, Spectator, Diogenes, Maximos and Rollo. The pseudonyms was used for different reasons. At one point he wrote for two competing publishers, and to prevent the publishers from finding out, he used the name Wilhelm at one publisher and Julius at the other.

In his books, Muus often let the underclass represent the villains, while the financially strong upper class represented the heroes. Several of his comedies were performed in Arbeidersamfunnet (a labor community), where he often visited as a guest. A few times he stepped in as an actor when the original cast could not perform.

A normal fee for writers of fiction at the time was about 10-15 Norwegian kroner per 16 page piece, regardless of the size of circulation. Handing in scripts at a steady pace therefore became a necessity in order to keep food on the table. The majority of the profits from Muus’ books and booklets fell into the hands of the publishing companies. One publisher made 50-60 thousand Norwegian kroner in one year on Muus’ books alone. Converted into today’s currency value, this number can be multiplied by one hundred.

The total production of Muus’ books is difficult to estimate. Due to his fascination with disguises and fake names, Muus operated with many pseudonyms. An estimate is complicated by the many obscure publishing companies that released his books. His works sold millions of copied, and at his time he was more read than Henrik Ibsen. Several of his books were also sold as translated pirated editions abroad.

== Miscellaneous ==
Though it was not mentioned in the opening credits, the movie Trysil-Knut was based on Muus’ book about the skilled cross-country skier.

== Selected titles ==
- Smedens datter, 1885 or 1886
- En sommernat paa Korsvolden (a play), 1887
- Gjest Baardsen, (a play), 1887
- Prillarguri. Bruden fra Romsdal, 1890 (as Julius, pseud.)Prillar-Guri
- Ravn den fredløse, 1897
- Olaf Trygvesønns helteliv, 1899
- Slaget på Svenskesletten, 1902 (as Vilhelm, pseud.)
- Maggi West eller Solgt til hvid Slavinde,1914 (as M.J., pseud.)
- Sæterjenten fra Rondane, 1922 (as Einar Ødet, pseud.)
- Nitedalspiken paa Røverkollen, 1923 (as Sigmund Tofte, pseud.)
- Gamle Kristiania-minder, (1923)
- Kristiania forstadsscener og deres skuespillere, 1924
- Dikterliv i gamle Kristiania, (1932)
