= Ingjald Haaland =

Norwegian actor and theatre director

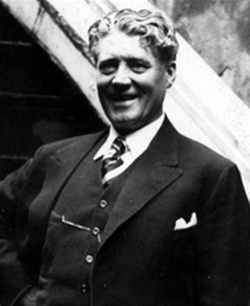
- Haaland c.1935
- Born: 22 March 1885; Haalandsdal, Norway
- Died: 28 July 1952 (aged 67)
- Occupations: Actor; Theatre director
- Spouse: Tove Bryn (m. 1937) (2nd marriage)
- Children: Turid Haaland

Ingjald Haaland (22 March 1885 – 28 July 1952) was a Norwegian actor and theatre director.

== Biography ==
Haaland was born in the Øvre Hålandsdalen valley area in Fusa Municipality in Søndre Bergenhus county, Norway (now part of Bjørnafjorden Municipality. He was the son of Sjur Haaland (1851–1912) and Brita Teigland (1855–1945). He was a student at Den Nationale Scene in Bergen from 1906. He made his stage debut at Dore Lavik's touring theatre in 1908. He was a member of the ensemble at Det Norske Teatret from its start in 1913, and served as theatre director from 1922 to 1933. He also performed at the Vestlandske Theater in Stavanger for a few years. When Det Norske Teatret was established in Oslo in 1913, he became employed there. He was theatre director from 1922 and stayed at Det Norske Teatret until 1940.

He also appeared in several movies including works by filmmaker Olav Dalgard including Samhold må til from 1935. He was most noted for his leading role in the 1938 dramatic film Eli Sjursdotter which was based on the 1913 novel by Johan Falkberget. Haaland was married to actress Mally Carenius (1887–1934) and from 1937 to Tove Bryn (1903–1983).

Cultural offices
Preceded by Amund Rydland	Director of the Det Norske Teatret; 1922–1933	Succeeded by Hans Jacob Nilsen
