= Aagot Børseth =

Norwegian actress (1898–1993)

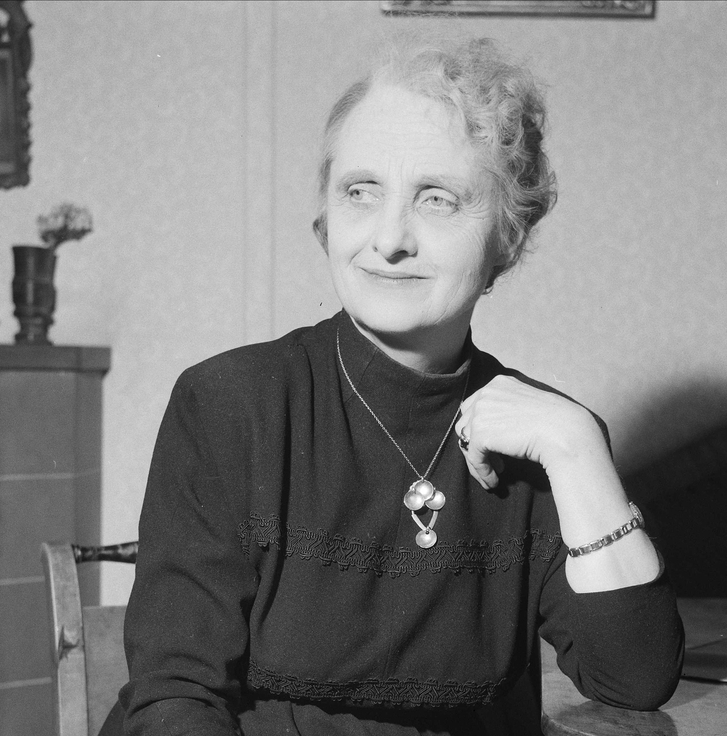
- Aagot Børseth in 1959
- Born: 29 November 1898; Kristiania (now Oslo), Norway
- Died: 19 December 1993 (aged 95); Oslo, Norway
- Occupation: Actress
- Years active: 1918–1968
- Spouse: Henrik Børseth

Aagot Børseth (29 November 1898 – 19 December 1993) was a Norwegian actress.

== Biography ==
Aagot Tangen was born in Kristiania (now Oslo), Norway. She made her debut at Rogaland Teater in Stavanger during 1918 as Grete in Faddergaven by Peter Egge (1869–1959). Later she came to Chat Noir, where she noted herself as the street girl Gusti in Flammen. She came to the Nationaltheatret in 1928 and performed there for 40 years. She made her film debut in Felix (1921) and participated in numerous Norwegian films including Frestelse (1940) and Selkvinnen (1953). She was also a widely used actor on Radioteatret and on television.

She was married to Henrik Børseth (1885–1970), who was also an actor at the Nationaltheatret. She died in 1993 and was buried at Vestre gravlund in Oslo.

== Filmography ==
- Fru Inger til Østråt (1975)
- Eiszeit (1975) (TV)
- Bernardas hus (1964) (TV)
- Sønner av Norge kjøper bil (1962)
- Sønner av Norge (1961)
- Støv på hjernen (1959)
- Selkvinnen (1953)
- Frestelse (1940)
- Felix (1921)
