= Rut Tellefsen =

Norwegian actress (born 1930)

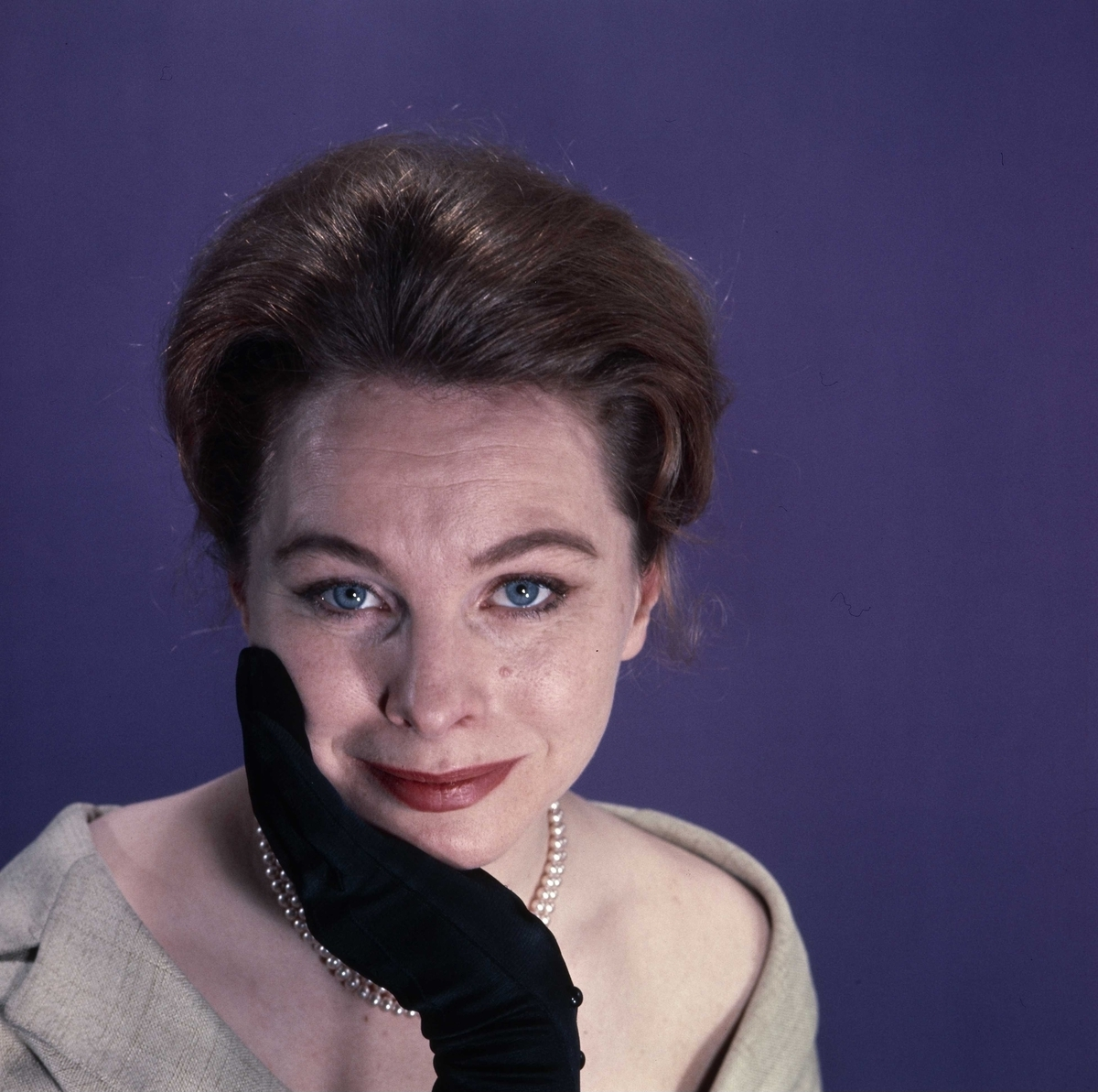
- Rut Tellefsen in 1962
- Born: 23 August 1930 (age 95); Malvik Municipality, Norway
- Occupation: Actress
- Spouse: Tom Tellefsen (m. 1955–1962) Kjell Bækkelund (m. 1966–1972)
- Awards: Amanda Award (1996); Order of St. Olav (2000)

Rut Tellefsen (born 23 August 1930) is a Norwegian actress. She is a recipient of the Amanda Award, and of the Order of St. Olav.

== Personal life ==
Tellefsen was born in Malvik Municipality on 23 August 1930, a daughter of Johan Fredriksen and Anna Bergljot Smaage. She was married to actor Tom Tellefsen from 1955 to 1962, and to Kjell Bækkelund from 1966 to 1972.

== Career ==
Tellefsen made her stage debut at Det Norske Teatret in 1956. She worked for Fjernsynsteatret in its early days, during the 1960s, and she was assigned to Oslo Nye Teater 1969 to 1973. She was co-founder and later artistical director of Telemark Teater, and was assigned to Nationaltheatret from 1981 to 2001.

== Awards ==
Tellefsen was awarded the Norwegian Theatre Critics Award for 1985/1986, but did not want to accept the prize. She received the Amanda Award in 1996 for her role in the film Kristin Lavransdatter. She was decorated Knight, First Class of the Order of St. Olav in 2000.
