= Leif Enger (actor) =

Norwegian actor

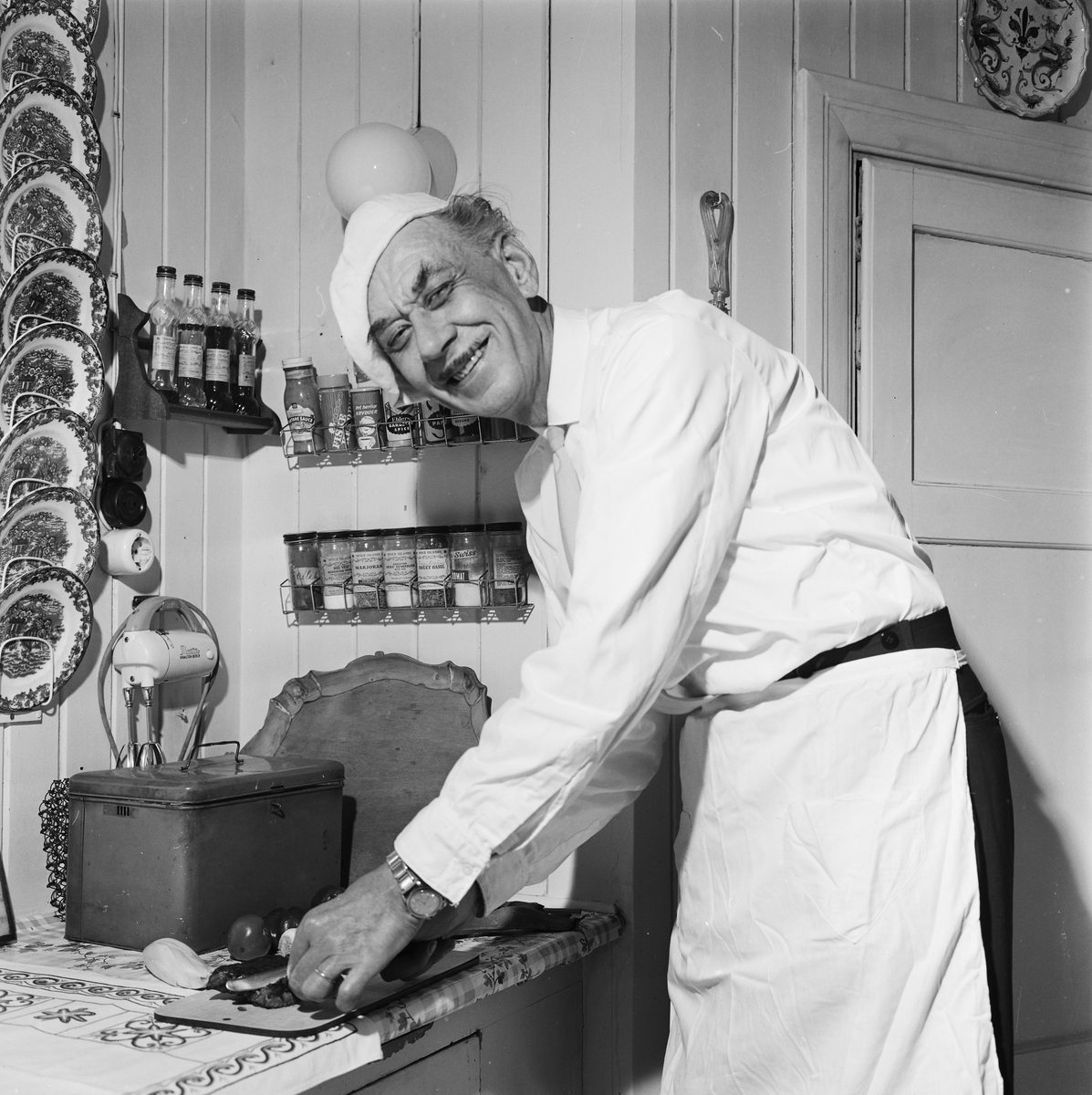
- Born: September 5, 1900; Christiania (now Oslo)
- Died: November 11, 1977 (aged 77); Oslo
- Occupation: Actor

Leif Omdahl Enger (September 5, 1900 – November 11, 1977) was a Norwegian actor.

Enger was born in Christiania (now Oslo). He appeared in a series of roles for the Norwegian Broadcasting Corporation's radio theater. He was also a popular film actor, appearing in over 20 films. Among the best-known films he appeared in are Operasjon Løvsprett, Hunger (Norwegian: Sult), and Englandsfarere. Enger died in Oslo and is buried in Oslo's West Cemetery.

== Partial filmography ==
- 1923: Strandhugg paa Kavringen as Skurken
- 1934: Op med hodet! as Skuespiller
- 1933: Jeppe på bjerget as Musicus
- 1941: The Sausage-Maker Who Disappeared (Norwegian: Den forsvundne pølsemaker) as engineer Barratt
- 1941: Gullfjellet as Larsen
- 1946: Englandsfarere as Jacob Vollen
- 1946: Vi vil leve
- 1946: Fun and Fancy Free (Norwegian: Bongo) as Willie the Giant (Norwegian: Kjempen Willy)
- 1948: Trollfossen as the chauffeur
- 1951: Storfolk og småfolk as Tjenere
- 1951: Alice in Wonderland (Norwegian: Alice i Eventyrland) as the walrus
- 1952: Veslefrikk med fela as the bailiff
- 1953: Peter Pan as George Darling and the Indian Chief
- 1957: Peter van Heeren
- 1958: På tokt med terna
- 1958: Bustenskjold
- 1960: Millionær for en aften
- 1961: Oss atomforskere i mellom
- 1962: Operasjon Løvsprett as the general
- 1964: Klokker i måneskinn as the art dealer in "The Journalist’s Tale"
- 1964: Nydelige nelliker as Harry
- 1966: Hunger (Norwegian: Sult) as Colonel Schinkel (uncredited)
- 1968: De ukjentes marked as Laseth, a homeless man
- 1968: Olsen-Banden operasjon Egon as the suspicious man
- 1970: Ballad of the Masterthief Ole Hoiland (Norwegian: Balladen om mestertyven Ole Høiland) as a man in the company (final film role)
