= Øistein Børke =

Norwegian actor (1911–1975)

- Born: December 18, 1911; Kristiania (now Oslo), Norway
- Died: April 1, 1975 (aged 63); Oslo, Norway
- Resting place: Vestre gravlund
- Occupation: Actor
- Spouse: Gretelill Fries (1943–1949)

Øistein Bull Børke (first name sometimes Øystein, December 18, 1911 – April 1, 1975) was a Norwegian actor and theater personality.

== Life and family ==
Børke was born in Kristiania (now Oslo), Norway. He was married to the actress Gretelill Fries from 1943 to 1949.

== Career ==
Børke debuted as a stage actor at the New Theater in 1938. In 1947 he founded the Rogaland Theater, which he managed from 1947 to 1949. He wrote the children's comedy Askeladden og kongsdatteren, which premiered at the Central Theater in Oslo in 1945.

In addition to his theater activity, Børke also appeared in two films in 1941.

== Filmography ==
- 1941: Hansen og Hansen as Dahl, a secretary
- 1941: Gullfjellet as Lars Heksvold
