= Karl Holter =

Norwegian actor

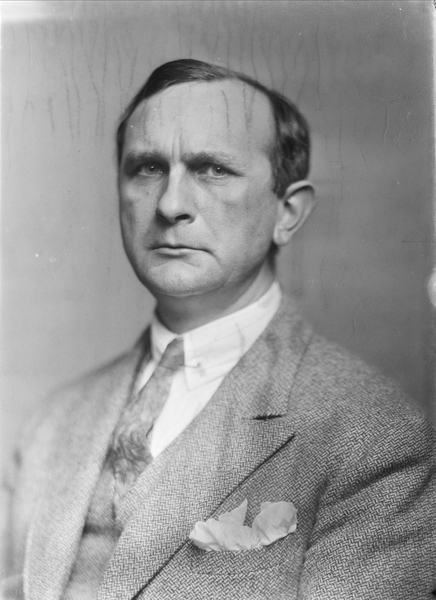
- Born: June 30, 1885; Kristiania
- Died: June 7, 1963 (aged 77); Oslo, Norway
- Resting place: Vestre Gravlund
- Occupation: Actor
- Spouses: Betzy Holter, Gudrun Augusta Larsen

Karl Holter (June 30, 1885 – June 7, 1963) was a Norwegian actor, writer, and Waffen-SS member.

Holter was born in Kristiania (now Oslo), Norway. He debuted in 1912 at the Central Theater and after that was mainly engaged with the Norwegian Theater until 1935. He was also a journalist for the newspaper Stavanger Aftenblad from 1917 to 1920.

== Literary activity ==
In 1936, at age 51, Holter won the Norwegian part of an international novel competition with the story Skinnbrevet (The Parchment Letter). This was also his debut as a writer.

In 1941, Holter became a member of Nasjonal Samling. The same year, he directed Henrik Ibsen's Ghosts for NRK's Radio Theater. In 1942 he volunteered for active front duty. After a short period of officer training, at age 57 Holter was sent to the Leningrad Front from October 1942 to March 1943 as a war correspondent.

Holter was considered a prominent author in Nasjonal Samling circles, and he became one of Gyldendal's most published authors while the publisher was led by Tore Hamsun.

After the war, Holter was convicted of treason and sentenced to three years and three months of forced labor and limited loss of rights. After serving his sentence, Holter did not return as an actor, but he continued to write and published five books. Among these was Frontkjempere (Front-Line Soldiers, 1951), a description of experiences at the Leningrad Front.

== Death ==
Holter died on June 7, 1963 at age 78 in Oslo, Norway.

== Bibliography ==
- 1936: Skinnbrevet
- 1940: Kleivdøler
- 1944: I veideskog: Jaktminner
- 1948: Bliss
- 1951: Frontkjempere
- 1953: Terkel
- 1956: Gode makter

== Filmography ==
- 1926: Baldevins bryllup as a butcher
- 1939: Mot nya tider as Henrik Thygesen
- 1939: Valfångare as the captain of Kosmos II
- 1940: Bastard as Iwan, a farmer
- 1941: Gullfjellet as Hans Benningstad
- 1942: Trysil-Knut as Ole Kynsberg
