= Oscar Aagaard =

Norwegian writer

- Born: July 4, 1855; Sandefjord, Sweden-Norway
- Died: May 4, 1936 (aged 80)
- Occupation: Writer

Oscar Aagaard (July 4, 1855 – May 4, 1936) was a Norwegian writer. Oscar Aagaard was the brother of the priest and author Gustav Aagaard (1852–1927).

== Works ==
- Paa Streiftog (In the Foray, 1893)
- Underlige fyre (Strange Guys, 1894)
- Fru Junos salon (Mrs. Juno's Salon, 1895)
- Farlige farvande (Dangerous Waters, 1896)
- Kaptein Heire og hans gutter (Captain Heire and His Boys, 1898)
- Martin Ligeglads meriter (Martin Ligeglad's Merits, 1899)
- Arboe & søn (Arboe & Son, 1900)
- Kakerlaker (Cockroaches, 1904)
- Kongen i kjælderen (The King in the Cellar, 1906)
- Hjertets Melodier (Melodies of the Heart, 1908)
