= Gudrun Augusta Larsen =

Norwegian author

- Born: November 12, 1905; Halden, Norway
- Died: May 3, 1957 (aged 51); Åmot, Norway
- Resting place: Drammen, Norway
- Occupation: Author
- Spouse: Karl Holter

Gudrun Augusta Larsen (November 12, 1905 – May 3, 1957) was a Norwegian writer. She published four novels during the interwar period.

== Life and work ==
Gudrun Augusta Larsen was born in Halden, Norway. She had a three-year technical education after primary school, and she worked for three years as a telephone operator at the Halden telephone exchange. In the 1920s she moved to Denmark, where she worked as a dental assistant in Viborg. After five years, she returned to Halden to be at her mother's deathbed. It was at that time that she began writing her first novel.

She made her literary debut in 1932 with the novel Levebrød (Livelihood). She was strongly inspired by Ernest Hemingway, on whom she modeled her concise, sculpted style. Levebrød depicts clashes between the contrasting pairs of religion versus eroticism, Christianity versus modern paganism, and education versus life. According to reviewer Finn Halvorsen, the book was perhaps the most important debut in 1932.

In the years that followed, she wrote the novels Frie mennesker (Free People, 1933), Over grensen (Across the Border, 1937), and De snakker i byen (They're Talking in Town, 1938). All of her novels attracted attention when they were published. In 1940, Larsen sent the manuscript of a novel called Farlig spill (A Dangerous Game) to her publisher, Aschehoug. The author herself wanted to wait with publication until the war was over, and the script was returned to her. Since then it has been lost.

Larsen's husband, Karl Holter, actively participated on the side of the Nazis during the war, and his postwar conviction for treason also affected Larsen. She was unable to resume writing after the war.

== Family ==
Gudrun Augusta Larsen was the daughter of the mason Ludvig Larsen (1864–1959) and his Swedish-born wife Augusta Johannesson (1861–1931) from Dalsland. She married the writer, actor, and front-line soldier Karl Holter.

== Bibliography ==
- 1932: Levebrød (Livelihood; Oslo: Aschehoug)
- 1933: Frie mennesker (Free People; Oslo: Aschehoug)
- 1937: Over grensen (Across the Border; Oslo: Aschehoug)
- 1938: De snakker i byen (They're Talking in Town, Oslo: Aschehoug)
