= Circus Fandango =

1954 film

- Norwegian theatrical release poster
- Directed by: Arne Skouen
- Written by: Arne Skouen
- Starring: Arne Arnardo
- Cinematography: Finn Bergan
- Edited by: Eric Nordemar
- Release date: 22 February 1954
- Running time: 87 minutes
- Country: Norway
- Language: Norwegian

Circus Fandango (Norwegian: Cirkus Fandango) is a 1954 Norwegian drama film directed by Arne Skouen. It was entered into the 1954 Cannes Film Festival.

== Plot ==
Fandango is the director of a traveling circus consisting of a small group of performers. However, a clear conflict exists between the director and several of the artists. One point of contention involves the elderly clown, Papa, who is forced to serve as a human target for an archer struggling with severe alcoholism. Many of the other employees demand that this dangerous act be cancelled.

The situation shifts when a young man named Jannik arrives at the circus and takes over Tove's job. Jannik possesses skills as both a pickpocket and an imitator, and he quickly falls in love with Tove.

== Cast ==
- Arne Arnardo as Fandango, manager
- Joachim Holst-Jensen as Papa, clown
- Ilselil Larsen as Tove
- Toralv Maurstad as Jannik
- Adolf Bjerke as the doctor
- Svein Byhring as the stable boy
- Anita Ellingsen as the nurse
- Turid Haaland as Carmen
- Jørgen Henriksen as Stump
- Arvid Nilssen as the carpenter
- Aud Schønemann
- Alberto Schtirbu as Harmandez
- Tom Tellefsen as the director
- Einar Vaage as Raskolnikov, master of the stables
- Ottar Wicklund as Alfred
