= Ungen =

- Directed by: Rasmus Breistein; Oskar Braaten
- Written by: Rasmus Breistein; Oskar Braaten
- Based on: Oskar Braaten's play Ungen: folkeliv i fire akter
- Produced by: Johannes Jensen
- Starring: Eva Sletto; Harald Heide Steen; Ragnhild Hald
- Cinematography: Gunnar Nilsen-Vig
- Edited by: Gunnar Nilsen-Vig
- Distributed by: Norsk film A/S
- Release date: 1938
- Running time: 100 minutes
- Country: Norway
- Language: Norwegian

Ungen (The Child or The Kid) is a Norwegian drama film from 1938 directed by Rasmus Breistein. The lead roles are played by Eva Sletto, Harald Heide Steen, and Ragnhild Hald. It is a film adaptation of Oskar Braaten's 1911 play Ungen: folkeliv i fire akter (The Child: Everyday Life in Four Acts). A new version of the film was made in 1974 as a musical.

== Plot ==
Julius and Milja are in love with each other and they also work at the same factory. Petrina, a girl from Oslo's Grønland neighborhood, flirts with Julius and tricks him into stealing from the factory, which causes him to be fired. A year passes, and Julius has left Milja for Petrina. Milja has had a child and during the day, when she works, she leaves the child with Hønse-Lovisa. A doctor, who has been sent out by rich people to find children to adopt, persuades Milja to give away her child. After she has given her child up, she realizes what she has done and becomes desperate. However, Hønse-Lovisa does not think it was a wise decision to give up the child and has therefore kept the child with her. When Milja returns after a night of dancing, she finds the child at home.

== Cast ==
- Eva Sletto as Milja
- Harald Heide Steen as Julius
- Ragnhild Hald as Hønse-Lovisa
- Tove Bryn as Petrina
- Astrid Sommer as Krestena
- Agnethe Schibsted-Hansson as Gurina
- Hans Bille as the doctor
- Hauk Aabel as Krestoffer
- Martin Gisti as Engebret
- Liv Uchermann Selmer as Lagreta, Julius's mother
- Signe Ramberg as Olina
- Maj Nielsen-Sæther as Sergeant Petra
- Ellinor Borg as a patient in the waiting room
- Ellen Bugge as a patient in the waiting room
- Bjarne Bø as a patient in the waiting room
- Helge Essmar as Olaf
- Marie Hedemark as a working woman
- Joachim Holst-Jensen as a waiter
- Ole Leikvang as a patient in the waiting room
- Kirsten Monrad-Aas as a woman from the West End
- Pehr Qværnstrøm as a restaurateur
- Guri Stormoen as a patient in the waiting room
- Jan Vaage as a patient in the waiting room
- Kåre Wicklundas Elias
- Alfred Helgeby as the milkman
- Sonja Marie Bakkely as the child
