= Olga Sjøgren =

Norwegian actress (1884–1960)

- Born: September 9, 1884; Kristiania (now Oslo), Norway
- Died: November 8, 1960 (aged 76)
- Occupation: Actress
- Spouse(s): Carl Almquist (1908–1914); Josef Sjøgren

Olga Pauline Sjøgren (née Hagen, August 9, 1884 – November 8, 1960) was a Norwegian actress and singer. She excelled as a revue actress and operetta singer, and she became involved early in film. She was also known as Olga Almquist.

== Family ==
Olga Sjøgren was the daughter of the tailor Erik Hagen and his Swedish-born wife Kristine Andersdotter. She married the actor Carl Johan Olaf Almquist (1879–1914) on June 28, 1902, and they had two sons. She then married the actor Josef Peder Marcus Sjøgren (1891–1927).

== Life and work ==
Olga Pauline Hagen was a student at Ludovica Levy's Second Theater academy in 1899. After that, she was engaged with the Eldorado Theater, the Tivoli Theater, and the Kongshavn Summer Theater, all in her hometown of Kristiania (now Oslo).

She was later associated with the Stavanger Theater, the Falkberget Theater, and the Norwegian Operetta Company (Norwegian: Det norske operetteselskap). She also toured with Bjørn Bjørnevik's Bjørnevik Theater, where she participated in more than 1,400 productions of the play Skjærgårdsflirt by Gideon Wahlberg. She also starred in the film version of Skjærgårdsflirt.

== Theater roles ==
- Rose in the operetta Les Premiers Pas (Norwegian title: Et Eventyr i Tyrol) by Daniel Auber and Adolphe Adam (Trondheim, 1906)
- Ganymedes in the operetta Die schöne Galathée (Norwegian title: Den skjønne Galathea) by Franz von Suppé (Bygdøy Sjøbad, 1909)
- Madam Grisk in the revue Christian Fredriksen by Thorleif Klausen (Kongsberg, 1914)
- Turtelduen in the revue Christian Fredriksen by Thorleif Klausen (Kongsberg, 1914)
- Katrine in Gideon Wahlberg's Skjærgårdsflirt

== Filmography ==
- 1914: Fredriksen Fald as a servant girl (credited as Olga Almquist)
- 1932: Skjærgårdsflirt as Katrine, a servant girl at the Østerman house
- 1939: Hu Dagmar as Oline, a servant girl
- 1942: Trysil-Knut as a servant girl at the Kynsberg house
