= Strandhugg paa Kavringen =

1923 film

- Directed by: Trygve Dalseg; Gunnar Nilsen-Vig
- Written by: Gunnar Nilsen-Vig
- Produced by: Trygve Dalseg
- Starring: Svein Lysell; Lizzie Florelius; Katja Wallier; Leif Enger
- Cinematography: Gunnar Nilsen-Vig
- Edited by: Gunnar Nilsen-Vig
- Distributed by: Specialfilms AS
- Release date: 1923
- Running time: 65 minutes
- Country: Norway
- Language: Norwegian

Strandhugg paa Kavringen (The Coastal Raid at Kavringen) is a 65-minute Norwegian film from 1923 that is now considered lost.

The screenplay was written by Gunnar Nilsen-Vig, who was also one of the film's directors. Egil Sætren designed the sets, and Svein Lysell, Lizzie Florelius, Katja Wallier, and Leif Enger appeared in the main roles. Leif Enger was also responsible for makeup. The film also featured the Chat Noir ballet.

The plot has several similarities to Ludvig Holberg's well-known comedy Jeppe on the Hill.

== Plot ==
A poor man is sent by his wife to buy fish. On the way to the fish market, he gets drunk, using the money he was supposed to buy the fish with. The man does not dare go home without fish, and he steals a small boat with fishing gear to try his luck. He does not catch any fish, and he drinks the rest of the alcohol he has left before he falls asleep in the boat. As he sleeps, he dreams that he is engaged in a coastal raid at Kavringen, where he experiences many marvelous things. When he wakes up his wife appears, and the mysteries he experienced in his sleep are resolved by his wife with striking arguments.

== Cast ==
- Svein Lysell as Silas
- Lizzie Florelius as his wife
- Katja Wallier as The Beautiful Unknown
- Leif Enger as the villain
