= Lizzie Florelius =

Norwegian actress (1886–1975)

- Born: September 19, 1886; Kristiania (now Oslo)
- Died: December 30, 1975 (aged 89)
- Occupation: Actress

Lizzie Florelius (September 19, 1886 – December 30, 1975) was a Norwegian actress.

Florelius was born in Kristiania (now Oslo). She had her film debut in 1923 in Strandhugg paa Kavringen, in which she played the wife of the main character, Silas. She appeared in another silent film in 1927, Syv dager for Elisabeth. After that she acted in three sound films: Bra mennesker (1937), De vergeløse (1939), and Ut av mørket (1958). She was also active in the Norwegian Broadcasting Corporation's radio theater, and in 1926 she played in the first Norwegian radio broadcast of Peer Gynt.

Florelius died in 1975 and is buried in Our Savior's Cemetery in Oslo.

== Filmography ==
- 1923: Strandhugg paa Kavringen as Silas's wife
- 1927: Syv dager for Elisabeth as Anna Palme
- 1937: Bra mennesker as Mrs. Løvdal
- 1939: De vergeløse as the woman from the child welfare committee
- 1958: Ut av mørket
