= Elly Kjølstad =

Norwegian stage actress (1850–1930)

- Born: October 3, 1850; Bergen, Norway
- Died: August 30, 1930 (aged 79); Oslo, Norway
- Occupation: Actress
- Children: Snefrid Aukland
- Relatives: Mathilde Nielsen

Elvina Teresia "Elly" Kjølstad (née Nielsen, October 3, 1850 – August 30, 1930) was a Norwegian stage actress.

== Family ==
Elly Kjølstad was the daughter of the journeyman Niels Christian Nielsen and Marte Elisabeth Olsen (Larsen). She was the sister of the actress Mathilde Nielsen. On August 31, 1873, she married the orthopedist and lawyer Thorvald Nils Gotfrid Essendrop Kjølstad (1832–1910). Their daughter Snefrid Aukland (a.k.a. Erika Warnecke) was also an actress. An older daughter, Svanhild, died in 1885.

== Career ==
Elly Kjølstad was a pupil of the Danish theater director Frederik Adolph Cetti in her hometown of Bergen. She made her stage debut with Cetti's company in the autumn of 1870 in the play Syv militære Piger. She followed Cetti in the 1870–1871 season in Bergen and Trondheim. She made her Christiania debut on March 27, 1873, at the Christiania Theatre, in the role of Helen in Slægtningene. She was employed at this theater for a few years, after which she was associated with the Carl Johan Theater for a period. In the fall of 1900, she went on tour with the production Nordstrandrevyen. In 1910 she took part in Bjørn Bjørnson's tour in Denmark, where she played Malla in the play Geografi og Kærlighed. She also took part in the same tour in Norway the following year.

== Selected roles ==
- Helen in Slægtningene by Henriette Nielsen (Christiania Theater, 1873)
- Ulrikke in Unsere Frauen (Norwegian title: Vore Koner) by Gustav von Moser and Franz von Schönthan (Fredrikshalds Teater, 1882)
- The bride in the vaudeville monologue Bruden paa Staburet by Hans Schulze (1883)
- The merchant's wife in Ein geadelter Kaufmann (Norwegian title: Børsbaronen) by Karl August Görner (Carl Johan Theater, 1893)
- Nille in Jeppe paa Bierget by Ludvig Holberg (Trondheim, 1896)
- Malla in Geografi og Kærlighed by Bjørnstjerne Bjørnson (Denmark, 1910)
