= Olav Sletto =

Norwegian writer

Olav Sletto (21 June 1886 – 24 October 1963 ) was a Norwegian novelist and educator. He was born in Hol, and was the father of Eva Sletto. He made his literary debut in 1908, with the story Dei gamle. Among his historical novels is the trilogy Valet, Primas and Frukt from 1926 to 1928. He wrote a series of autobiographical books, starting with Per Spegil from 1939. He worked as a school teacher from 1917, and was founder and principal of a folk high school at Årnes.
