= Henrik Børseth =

Norwegian actor

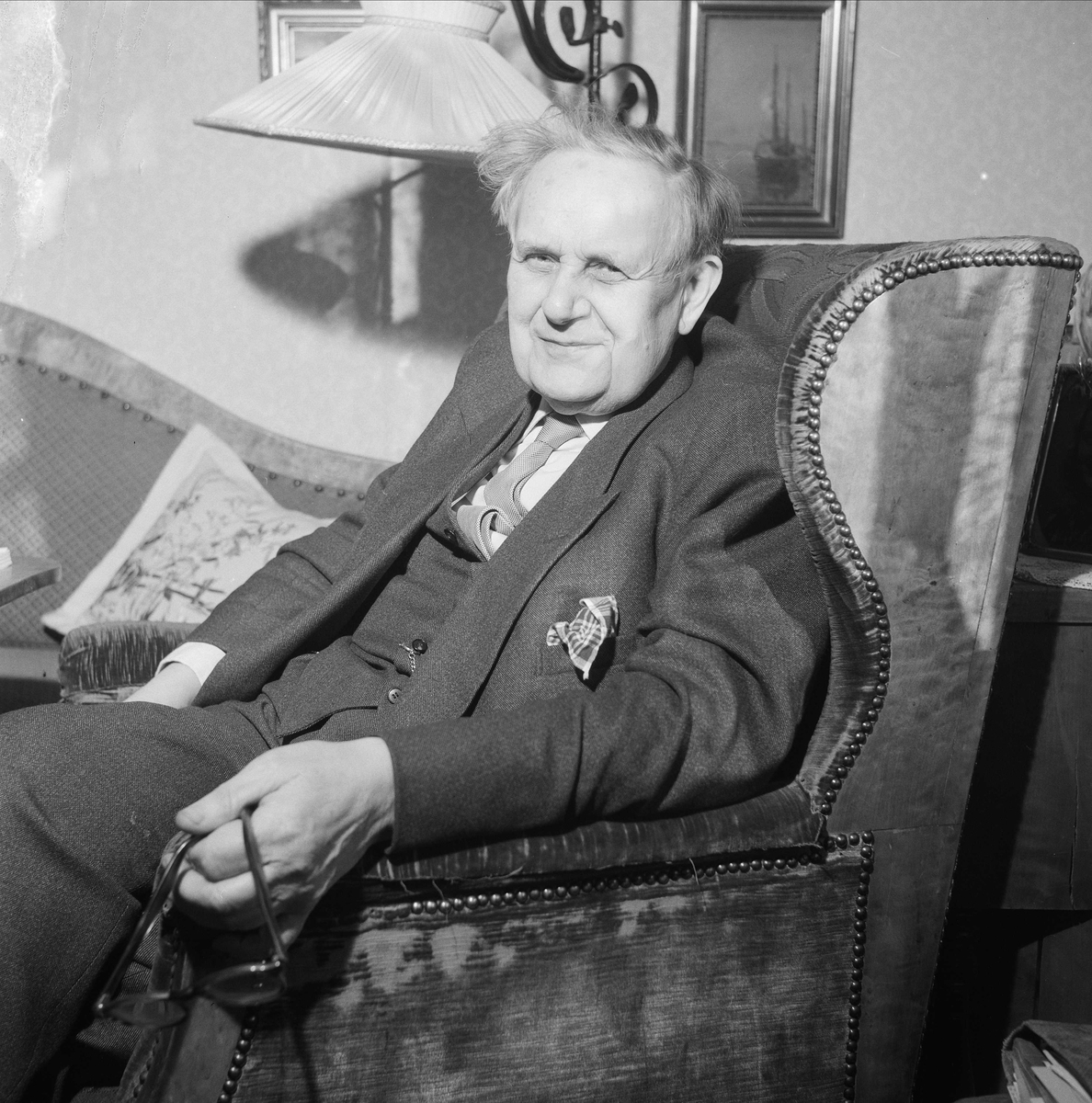
- Henrik Børseth in 1959
- Born: 30 April 1885; Haugesund, Norway
- Died: 18 September 1970 (aged 85)
- Occupation: Actor
- Notable work: Vår ære og vår makt, Nederlaget
- Spouse: Aagot Børseth

Henrik Børseth (30 April 1885 – 18 September 1970) was a Norwegian actor. He was born in Haugesund, and was married to actress Aagot Børseth. He made his stage debut at Det Norske Teatret in 1914, and was assigned to Nationaltheatret in Oslo from 1925. He typically played character roles. Among his best performances were his roles as the sailor Vingrisen in Nordahl Grieg's play Vår ære og vår makt, and as Besley in Grieg's Nederlaget.
