= Eva Sletto =

Norwegian actress (1912–2006)

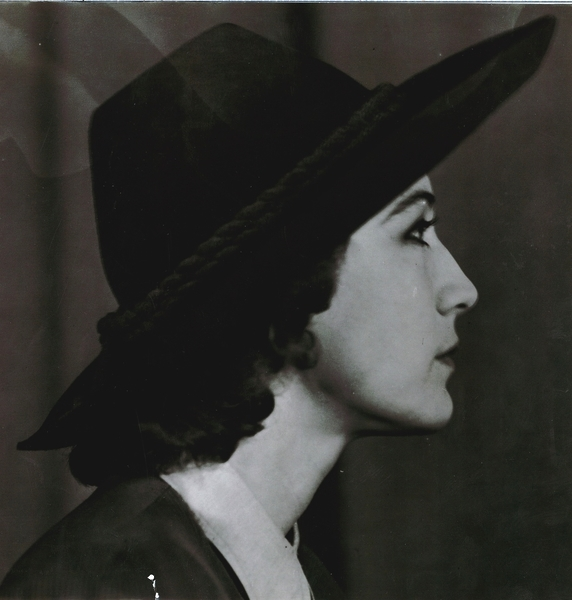
- Eva Sletto, c. 1935
- Born: Eva Bryde Sletto; September 6, 1912; Asker, Norway
- Died: March 7, 2006 (aged 93); Oslo, Norway
- Burial place: Geilo, Norway
- Occupation: Actress
- Years active: 1936–1983
- Spouse: Cecil Christian Stephansen
- Parents: Olav Sletto (father); Karin Sletto (Bryde) (mother)

Eva Bryde Sletto (6 September 1912 – 7 March 2006) was a Norwegian actress and daughter of Olav Sletto and Karin Sletto.

She worked at Det Norske Teatret from 1936 to 1983. She is best known for her role as Milja in the film Ungen (The Baby) by Oskar Braaten in 1938, and also played Ismene in Sophocles' Antigone, Titania in Shakespeare's A Midsummer Night's Dream and Olga in Chekhov's Three Sisters. Sletto also played in several movies in the early age of Norwegian cinema.

She retired from the stage in 1983, and lived in Oslo until her death in 2006 at the age of 93.

== Select filmography ==
- Dei svarte hestane (1951) as Lisle Førnes
- Vigdis (1943) as Vigdis Bjørkli
- Trysil-Knut (1942)
- Gullfjellet (1941) as Randi
- Godvakker-Maren (1940) as Maren
- Hu Dagmar (1939) as Ingeborg
- Ungen (1938) as Milja
- Norge for folket (1936)
