= Ove Ansteinsson =

Norwegian journalist and author

Ove Arthur Ansteinsson
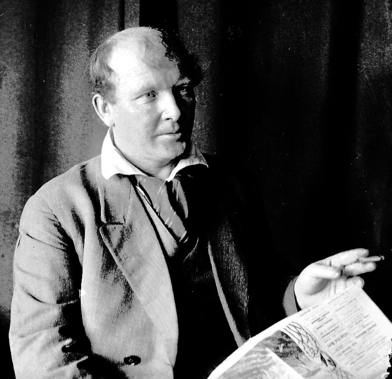
- Born: March 23, 1882; Risør, Norway
- Died: October 15, 1942 (aged 60)
- Occupations: Journalist; author; playwright
- Writing career
- Years active: 1901–1942
- Genre: Drama
- Subjects: Hedmark folk life, rural culture

Ove Arthur Ansteinsson (March 23, 1882 – October 15, 1942) was a Norwegian journalist and author.

Ansteinsson was born in Risør, Norway. He made his first impact as a writer with his book Hedemarksfolk (Hedemark People, 1909), although his first short stories had already been published in the newspaper Oplandenes Avis in 1901. For a while, he was the editor of the newspaper Akershus. His other works include Ener Tuve (1910), Broder Nikolai og to andre (Brother Nikolai and Two Others, 1911), Svartskogen (The Black Forest, 1913), Smaahistorier (Little Stories, 1914), and Plankegjærdet (The Plank Fence, 1921). Two of his plays, Hu Dagmar (Dagmar, 1925) and Gullfjellet (Gold Mountain, 1927), were made into films in 1939 and 1941 under the direction of Rasmus Breistein.
