= Trygve Dalseg =

Norwegian marketing agent

Olaf Trygve Dalseg (15 September 1898 – 12 April 1987) was a Norwegian marketing agent.

He was born in Ringebu Municipality, Norway. He worked for the magazine Hjemmet and newspaper Morgenbladet and was also involved in film (directing the now-lost 1923 film Strandhugg paa Kavringen) before starting a career in marketing and advertising. His own marketing agency was named Dalseg Promotion. He was also affiliated with Institute of Marketing (Institutt for Markedsføring), and was an honorary member of Norwegian Association of Advertising Agencies who owned the Institute. He received an honorary medal from the Nordic association in 1956. Already in 1947 he was honored with the Royal Norwegian Order of St. Olav for his fundraising for Nasjonalhjelpen. He died in 1987.
