= Storfolk og småfolk =

- Directed by: Tancred Ibsen
- Written by: Tancred Ibsen
- Based on: Hans Aanrud's stories En odelsbonde, Mari Smehaugen, I bestefars ærend, Brødre i Herren, and Da jeg lå i byen med smør
- Produced by: Jan Erik Düring; Bjarne Stokland
- Starring: Gisle Straume; Grete Anthonsen; Haakon Arnold; Snefrid Aukland; Bjarne Bø; Edvard Drabløs
- Cinematography: Ragnar Sørensen; Verner Jensen
- Music by: Sverre Arvid Bergh
- Distributed by: Norsk Film AS
- Release date: October 29, 1951
- Running time: 91 minutes
- Country: Norway
- Language: Norwegian

Storfolk og småfolk (Important People and Common People) is a Norwegian black-and-white comedy film from 1951 directed by Tancred Ibsen. Ibsen also write the script for the film. The film is based on five stories by Hans Aanrud and the action is set in rural Norway. It follows both high and low society, including village characters, wealthy individuals, farmers, and "old timers."

The film was quite well received. Aftenposten wrote "In Mari Smehaugen and I bestefars ærend you feel something of the inner warmth and joy you had when you read the story in Aanrud's own language." Dagbladet wrote that "a number of our top actors appear and create down-to-earth theater sketches."

== Cast ==
- Gisle Straume as Per Oppigar'n
- Grete Anthonsen as Astrid, his daughter
- Haakon Arnold as Lars Kampesveen
- Snefrid Aukland as a woman in the village
- Bjarne Bø as Per Høgåsen
- Edvard Drabløs as Grandfather
- Leif Enger as the servant
- Johan Fillinger as the girl's boyfriend
- Berit Fossum as the wife
- Maria Hald as the servant girl
- Harald Heide-Steen Jr. as Ola, the son
