= Arne Arnardo =

Circus proprietor, performer

- Arnardo receiving the Royal Norwegian Order of St. Olav in 1988.
- Born: Arne Otto Lorang Andersen; 19 October 1912; Sarpsborg, Norway
- Died: 4 May 1995 (aged 82); Tøyen, Oslo
- Resting place: Vestre Moland Church cemetery, Lillesand Municipality; 58°15′31″N 8°21′54″E
- Occupations: Circus performer and -owner
- Known for: "Circus king" of Norway
- Spouses: Gerd Gløgaard, Eva Sørensen
- Children: Arild Arnardo Wenche Arnardo Signelill Arnardo Andersen
- Parent(s): Einar and Elna Andersen
- Website: http://www.arnardo.no/

Arne Arnardo (19 October 1912 – 4 May 1995), born Arne Otto Lorang Andersen, was a Norwegian circus performer and owner, generally referred to as the "circus king" of Norway. He escaped with the circus at an early age, took the stage name "Arnardo", and developed proficiency in several different acts. In 1949, he opened his own circus, under the name of Cirkus Arnardo. He became very popular and traveled all around the world finding new ways enhance his magician skills and get the audience attention.

== Biography ==
Arnardo was born in Sarpsborg, the son of lumberjack Einar Andersen and his wife Elna. He was interested in the entertainment industry from an early age, and escaped with Cirkus Empress as a teenager. Here he worked as a contortionist, illusionist and acrobat. In 1927, he took the stage name "Arnardo", under which he was invariably known since. He also performed as an equilibrist, trapeze artist, hypnotist and ventriloquist. In 1939 he became director of Cirkus Berny, before he was finally able to open his own circus in 1949 – under the name Cirkus Arnardo. In 1962, Arne Arnardo had already published his memoirs, Sirkusliv ("Circus Life"), written with Bjørn Bjørnsen. He continued to travel with his circus even after his health had begun to falter in the late eighties. Arnardo worked hard and provided for his family while working different positions decides just performing and being the star of the show.Although Arnardo later ended up in a wheel chair because of his health conditions, he continued to perform and followed his grandfather's footsteps of becoming a magician. After the death of his first wife, Gerd, in 1970, he married Eva Sørensen, née Steen. Circus Life a keen sense for public relations, Arnardo built the brand of his circus to become the best-known in Norway. He died in his caravan during a show in Tøyen, Oslo, in 1995. His son Arnild (a wirewalker) then took care of the management of Cirkus Arnardo, with his daughter Helen (a talented equestrienne) and her son, Are—who followed in his grandfather's footsteps and became a magician.

== Works and honours ==
Arnardo played in the movie Cirkus Fandango in 1954, and authored the autobiography Sirkusliv (Circus Life) in 1962. In 1973 he received the King's Medal of Merit in gold, and he was made Knight, First Class, of the Royal Norwegian Order of St. Olav 1988. He was married twice; to Gerd Gløgaard and Eva Sørensen, née Steene. After Arne Arnardo's death, his son Arild took over the role as director of Cirkus Arnardo.
