= Brudeferden i Hardanger =

1926 film

- Directed by: Rasmus Breistein
- Written by: Rasmus Breistein; Kristofer Janson (novel)
- Starring: Aase Bye; Gunhild Schytte-Jacobsen; Henry Gleditsch; Alfred Maurstad; Annik Saxegaard; Oscar Larsen
- Release date: 26 December 1926
- Running time: 104 minutes
- Country: Norway
- Language: Silent

Brudeferden i Hardanger (Norwegian: The bridal procession in Hardanger) is a 1926 Norwegian silent drama film directed by Rasmus Breistein, starring Aase Bye. The script was written by Breistein, based on the novel Marit Skjølte, by Kristofer Janson. The film is a romantic drama about two lovers who are separated and only get reunited in their old age. It started a trend of national romanticism in Norwegian film.

== Plot ==
Norway at the beginning of the 20th century: Several inhabitants of a small village on a fjord are boarding a ship to emigrate to the United States. Marit Skjølte refuses to follow her parents because she is in love with Anders Bjåland. Anders tells her that he is going to travel for a couple of years and will marry her when he comes back. He gives her his mother's brooch as token of his engagement. Four years later, Marit discovers that Anders is marrying the rich Kari Bjørve. She expresses her contempt towards him and goes to work for an old man in the mountains. One day, Tore, the man who always loved her comes to renew his offer to marry her. Marrit accepts to follow him.

Wedding Boat Procession

Many years have passed. Marit has become a rich widow, living with her son Vigleik and her daughter Eli. Anders poor and sick lives with his son Bård. Eli falls in love with Bård, and despite her mother's prohibition and her brother's threats, marries him and goes to live on his farm where she takes care of her sick father in law. Several years pass. Anders' wife has died poor and derelict. Marit begins to soften up and sends anonymously some food to her daughter. One day Vigleik, who has drunk too much, goes to the Bjåland farm, drags Anders out of his bed and throws him out of the house. Eli carries him to her mother who takes care of him. When Anders regains consciousness and sees that Marit has always carried his mother's brooch, he is full of remorse. They remember when they played bride and groom as children. Vigleik, ashamed by his behaviour emigrates to the United States and Marit and Anders spend their old days together.

== Cast ==
- Aase Bye as Marit Skjølte young
- Gunhild Schytte-Jacobsen as Marit Skjølte old
- Henry Gleditsch as Anders Bjåland young
- Alfred Maurstad as Vigleik, Marit's son
- Annik Saxegaard as Eli, Marit's daughter
- Oscar Larsen as Anders Bjåland old
- Martin Fiksen as Bård, Anders Bjåland's son
- Dagmar Myhrvold as Kari Bjørve
- Vilhelm Lund as Tore Skjølte
- Henny Skjønberg as Tore's mother

== Production and release ==
The outdoor takes were shot in Aga and Lofthus in Ullensvang Municipality, and on Tokheim Farm outside Odda. The indoor takes were filmed at The Art Room in Thunes Mek. Verksted, Skøyen.

The film premièred on 26 December 1926 at the Cirkus Verdensteater and Frogner Cinema Theatre, Oslo.

== Restoration ==
The film only existed in one, severely damaged 35 mm copy, with extremely unstable pictures, as the copy had shrunk, with extensive damages and scratches in the emulsion. The film was scanned in 2048x1556 pixels, and a total of 113.000 frames were individually stored and repaired. The data files were stabilized, illuminated and repaired with the most advanced equipment.

The copy that the Norwegian Film Institute had in its possession was an unedited version without titles. The Swedish title lists were found at The Swedish Film Classification Board in 1998.

From these files, a new, restored 35 mm negative was produced in 1999, with new music based on the original playlists, written by Halldor Krogh. Hardanger fiddle soloist: Einar Mjralsnes. Sound Engineer: Hékon Aarraen. Music producer: Halldor Krogh

Since 1999, several new title lists have surfaced. This has rendered it possible to reconstruct an omitted sequence which expands on the narrative in the film. In 2007, a new version, a few hundred meters longer, was released on DVD with Norwegian intertitles and English subtitles.
