= Astrid Sommer =

Norwegian actress (1906–1990)

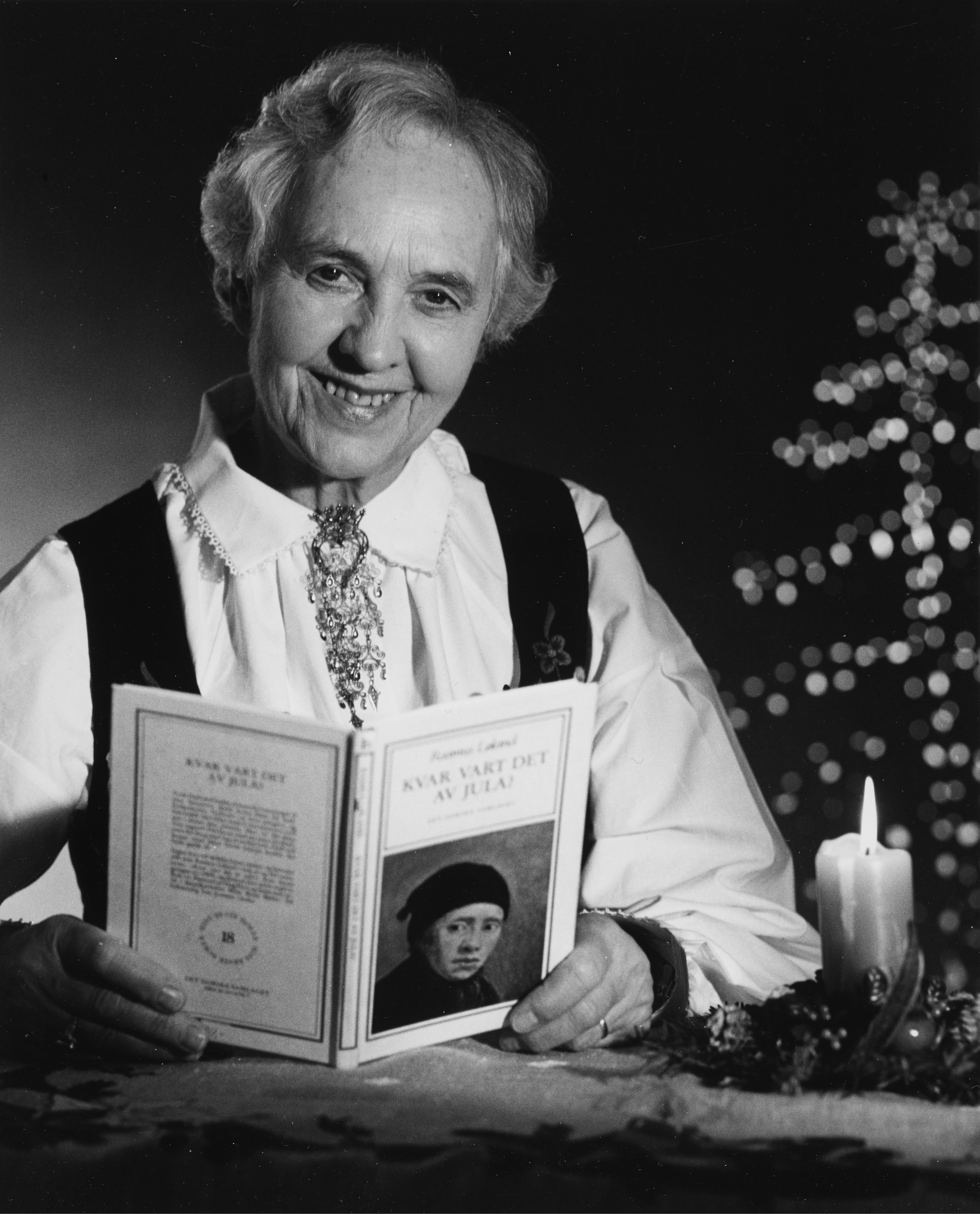
- Astrid Sommer in 1985
- Born: Astrid Christiansen; 21 May 1906; Kristiania, Norway
- Died: 9 April 1990 (aged 83); Oslo, Norway
- Occupation: Actress
- Spouse: Alf Marius Sommer (m. 1934; died 1963)
- Relatives: Johanne Bruhn (sister)

Astrid Sommer (née Christiansen; 21 May 1906 – 9 April 1990) was a Norwegian actress who worked at the Det Norske Teatret for more than fifty years.

== Personal life ==
Astrid Christiansen was born in Kristiania (now Oslo) on 21 May 1906, to Carl Christiansen and Agnes Mathilde Rosendahl (née Hansen). She was the younger sister of actress Johanne Bruhn, one of the leading actresses at the Det Norske Teatret. On 16 November 1934, she married actor Alf Marius Sommer (1899–1963) in Oslo.

== Career ==
Sommer's acting career began in 1918 when she played an extra on stage at the age of 12. In 1922, she began working as an apprentice at the Det Norske Teatret. Her breakthrough role was the character "Krestna" in Oskar Braaten's play Ungen in 1929. Among her other characters were "Kvitugla" in Olav Duun's Medmenneske (several times between 1937 and 1976), Maren Dokter in Arne Garborg's Læraren (in 1943, 1948 and 1951), and Smikkstugun in Alf Prøysens Trost i taklampa (1952 and 1963). She also played Bernarda in The House of Bernarda Alba, Mother Aase in Peer Gynt and appeared in Mother Courage.

Her films include Ungen (1938), Godvakker-Maren (1940), Trysil-Knut (1942), Trost i taklampa (1955) and Hans Nielsen Hauge (1961).

Sommer also acted in radio plays, including the role as the daughter Lotte in Lørdagsnatt by Vilhelm Moberg in 1975. She was also a popular reader of children's literature and poetry on radio.

== Later life and death ==
Sommer received several scholarships, including the Hulda Garborg's scholarship, Houen's scholarship, Oslo City's scholarship, the state's artist scholarship, a scholarship from the Friends of the Norwegian Theatre. In 1983, she received the culture prize from the city of Oslo.

She died in Oslo on 9 April 1990, at the age of 83.
