= Boys from the Streets =

1949 film by Arne Skouen

- Directed by: Ulf Greber; Arne Skouen
- Written by: Arne Skouen
- Starring: Tom Tellefsen; Ivar Thorkildsen; Pål Bang-Hansen; Svein Byhring; Per Knobelauch; Ella Hval; Jack Fjeldstad; Eva Steen
- Release date: 26 December 1949
- Running time: 77 minutes
- Country: Norway
- Language: Norwegian

Boys from the Streets (Norwegian: Gategutter) is a 1949 Norwegian drama film directed by Ulf Greber and Arne Skouen, starring, among others, Tom Tellefsen, Ivar Thorkildsen and Pål Bang-Hansen.

== Plot ==
The film takes place on the east side of Oslo in the early 1930s, and follows a gang of young boys who spend their spare time stealing coconuts from passing trucks. They devise a plan where two of the boys will hop up on the truck and cut open the bags of coconuts with their knives, and then toss them down to the rest of the gang who are following along behind the truck. Afterwards, they split up the looted coconuts. Eventually, the gang gets caught by the police and are hauled into the police station, but they are released with only a warning.
