= Daddy's Success =

- Directed by: Arne Skouen
- Written by: Arne Skouen
- Starring: Sølvi Wang; Henki Kolstad
- Release date: 22 October 1964
- Running time: 83 minutes
- Country: Norway
- Language: Norwegian

Daddy's Success (Norwegian: Pappa tar gull) is a 1964 Norwegian comedy film written and directed by Arne Skouen, starring Sølvi Wang and Henki Kolstad.

== Plot summary ==
Laffen (Kolstad) has lost the respect of his children, and needs to restore his honour.
