= Hans Andersen Foss =

American novelist

Hans Andersen Foss (November 25, 1851 – July 9, 1929) was a Norwegian-American author, newspaper editor and temperance leader. Foss is most noted for his Norwegian language novel, Husmands-gutte (1885) which was translated into English as The Cotter's Son. A story from Sigdal.

== Biography ==
Foss was born in Modum, Buskerud county, Norway. He was the son of a small tenant farmer, Anders Knudsen Fossen and his wife Karen Marie Henriksdatter. Foss immigrated to the United States in 1887.

A lifelong proponent of the temperance movement and the Populist Party, Foss edited several temperance publications. In 1886–87, he was editor of the Dakota Bladet magazine in Portland, North Dakota. From 1888 to 1893 served as editor for the Norwegian language newspaper Normanden in Grand Forks, North Dakota. In 1892, Foss was nominated as the North Dakota Populist Party candidate for Congress, but lost the election. Afterwards Foss gave up both politics and the newspaper business and became a grain dealer, eventually settling in Minot, North Dakota during 1906.

Foss is most associated with his 1885 novel, Husmandsgutte, (English: The Cotter's Son), of which the profits helped save Decorah Posten from bankruptcy.

Foss was married twice and had seven children. He died during 1929 in Minot, North Dakota.

== Selected works ==
- Husmandsgutten. En fortælling fra Sigdal (Decorah, Iowa: DP. 1885)
- Livet i Vesterheimen ( Decorah: AP. 1886)
- Den amerikanske saloon (Grand Forks, North Dakota: AP. 1889)
- Hvide slaver. En social-politisk skildring (Grand Forks, North Dakota: 1892)
- Allehaande (Minneapolis, MN: Scandinavian-American Publishing Assn. 1907)
- Valborg (Decorah, Iowa: DP. 1927)
