= Geografi og Kærlighed =

Play by Bjørnstjerne Bjørnson written in 1885

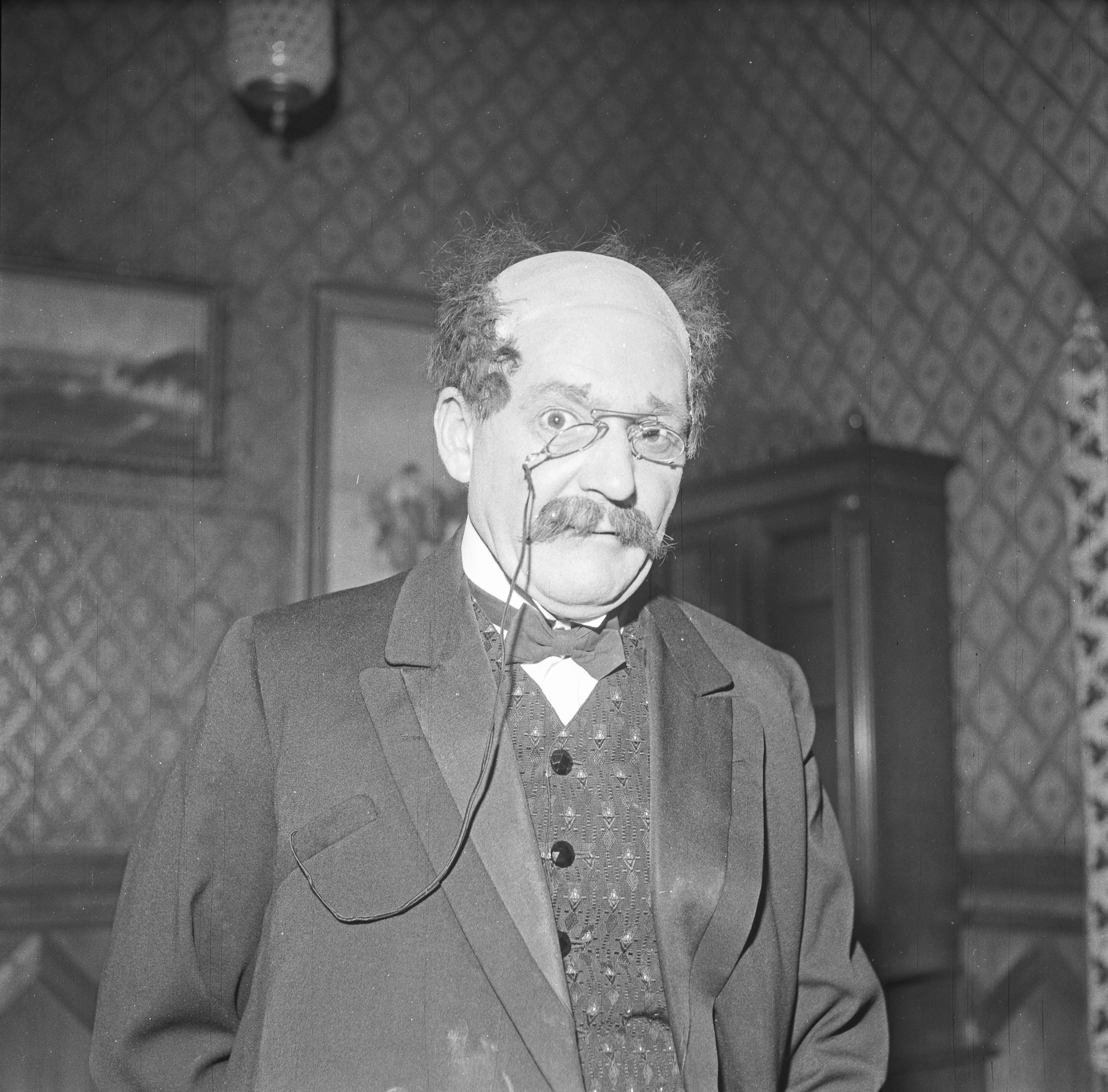
- Lothar Lindtner in Geografi og Kjærlighet (c. 1969)
- Original language: Norwegian
- Written by: Bjørnstjerne Bjørnson

Premiere
- Date: 1885
- Place: Christiania Theatre, Oslo, Norway

Geografi og Kærlighed (Geography and Love) is a play by the Norwegian playwright Bjørnstjerne Bjørnson. It was written in 1885 and it premiered at the Christiania Theatre on October 21, 1885. Bjørnson later reworked the last act of the play in the winter of 1893–1894.

The main characters in the play are Professor Tygesen and his wife Karen.

The play appeared in an English translation by Edwin Björkman titled Love and Geography in 1914.

The play has been performed a number of times in Norway's leading theaters, and it was filmed by NRK's Television Theater department in 1975.
