= Edvard Drabløs =

Norwegian actor and director

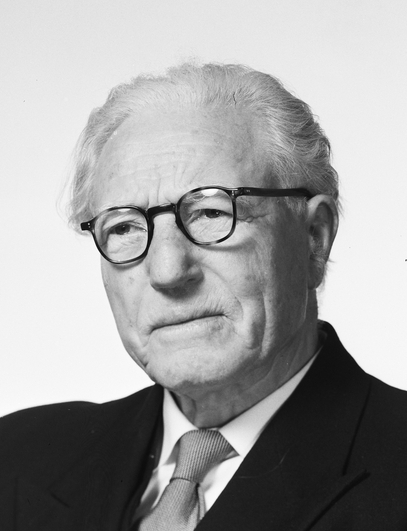
Edvard Drabløs in 1961

Edvard Drabløs (1 April 1883 – 29 April 1976) was a Norwegian actor and theatre director.

== Biography ==
Drabløs was born at Sykkylven Municipality in Møre og Romsdal, Norway. He was the son of Jens Helgesen Drabløs (1856–1925) and Olave Velle (1852–1917). He worked most of his professional career at Det Norske Teatret, from 1912. He was the director of this theatre from 1915 to 1916 and 1950 to 1951. He also appeared in approximately twenty films, beginning in the 1910s through the 1950s.

He was proclaimed Knight, First Class of the Royal Norwegian Order of St. Olav in 1953. Drabløs died in Oslo in 1976 at the age of 93.

== Filmography ==
Year	Title	Role	Notes
1920	Fante-Anne	Sorenskriveren	
1921	Jomfru Trofast	Albertus Kvalhei, Tones onkel	
1921	Felix	Abraham, losen	
1934	Liv	En bonde	
1938	Bør Børson Jr.	Bør Olderdalen, 'Gammel bør'	
1939	Gjest Baardsen	En fisker	
1940	Godvakker-Maren	Andreas, svoger til Endresen	
1940	Tørres Snørtevold	Tørres far	
1941	Gullfjellet	En bonde	
1942	Trysil-Knut	Pål Skolemester	
1946	Om kjærligheten synger de		
1950	To mistenkelige personer	Løsgjenger	
1951	Vi gifter oss	Hansen	
1951	Storfolk og småfolk	Bestefar	
1953	Skøytekongen		
1957	Nine Lives	Skolelæreren	

Cultural offices
Preceded by Rasmus Rasmussen	Director of the Det Norske Teatret; 1915–1916	Succeeded by Amund Rydland
