= Kommunenes Filmcentral =

Norwegian film distributor

Kommunenes Filmcentral was a film distributor in Norway.

It was established in 1919 when Kommunale Kinematografers Landsforbund, an association of municipal-owned cinemas, bought the private-owned Nerliens Filmbureau. It distributed films by Universum Film AG and United Artists, later the Walt Disney Company and Fox Film Corporation, and was among the leading bureaus in Norway. It was discontinued in 2002.
