= Rasmus Breistein =

Norwegian film director

- Born: 16 November 1890; Åsane
- Died: 16 October 1976 (aged 85)

Rasmus Breistein (November 16, 1890 – October 16, 1976) was a Norwegian film director.

== Life ==
Breistein was born in Åsane in the city of Bergen in Hordaland county, Norway. He was a farmer's son and learned to play fiddle in his youth, playing for dances at weddings in Western Norway. Later in life, in addition to directing films, he also performed on the Hardanger fiddle.

When the Norwegian Theater opened in 1913, he started acting at the theater. He became engaged with the new medium of film after seeing Peter Lykke-Seest's productions, and he decided to produce films in a completely different way. His first film was Fante-Anne (Gypsy Anne, 1920). In an interview he stated that "the film was the beginning of something, a Norwegian production with a more national character." This marked the beginning of the Norwegian heyday of the silent film age.

Breistein is considered the most important Norwegian filmmaker of the silent film era. During the period known as the "national breakthrough" in Norwegian film (1920–1930), he directed five feature films: Fante-Anne (Gypsy Anne, 1920), Felix (1921), Jomfru Trofast (Miss Faithful, 1921), Brudeferden i Hardanger (The Bridal Procession in Hardanger, 1926), and Kristine Valdresdatter (1930). With these films, he challenged Swedish films' former position of power and pleased both critics and audiences.

After audio films were invented, Breistein solidified his reputation as a director of the popular films Ungen (The Child, 1938) and Trysil-Knut (Knut from Trysil, 1942). The documentary films Jorden rundt på to timer (Around the World in Two Hours, 1949) and Tirich Mir til topps (To the Top of Tirich Mir, 1952) are classics in the history of Norwegian documentary film.

He died in Hollywood, and his urn was brought to Norway and placed in Bryn Church in Bærum.

== Films directed ==
- 1952: Tirich Mir til topps (To the Top of Tirich Mir)
- 1949: Jorden rundt på to timer (Around the World in Two Hours)
- 1943: Den nye lægen (The New Doctor)
- 1942: Trysil-Knut (Knut from Trysil)
- 1941: Gullfjellet (Gold Mountain)
- 1939: Hu Dagmar (Dagmar)
- 1938: Ungen (The Child)
- 1934: Liv (Life)
- 1932: Skjærgårdsflirt (Skerry Flirtation)
- 1930: Kristine Valdresdatter
- 1926: Brudeferden i Hardanger (The Bridal Procession in Hardanger)
- 1921: Felix
- 1921: Jomfru Trofast (Miss Faithful)
- 1920: Fante-Anne (Gypsy Anne)

== Awards ==
- 1961: Aamot Statuette
