= Jens Zetlitz =

Norwegian priest and poet (1761–1821)

Jens Zetlitz (26 January 1761 – 14 January 1821) was a Norwegian priest and poet.

Zetlitz was born at Stavanger in Rogaland, Norway. At the end of the 18th century he traveled to the University of Copenhagen to study theology. He became a member of The Norwegian Society (Det Norske Selskab) and became well known for his entertaining songs and drinking songs. He returned to Norway after completing his studies and entering the ministry. From 1800 Zetlitz was parish pastor and vicar at Vikedal Church in Ryfylke and from 1811 at Kviteseid Church in Telemark until his death in 1821.

He married Maren Elisabeth Bull (1761–1801). Their daughter Axeliane Christine (1792–1855) married businessperson and consul Jacob Kielland (1788–1863). The couple had five sons and five daughters. Through this marriage Jens Zetlitz had a large number of notable descendants; novelist Alexander Kielland was his great-grandnephew. The pop singer Bertine Zetlitz is the most famous currently living descendant.

A street in Stavanger is named for Jens Zetlitz, as is the Zetlitz multi-purpose hall in the Stavanger Concert Hall.

== Bibliography ==
Psalmer (1795)

- Poesier: første samling (1789)
- Eegenæs: et Digt med Anmærkninger (1793)
- Sange for den norske bondestand (1795)
- Psalmer (1795)
- En norsk Höst: et Digt (1800)
- Johan Nordahl Brun, Biskop over Bergens Stift (1805)
- Alkoran: d.e. Capitlernes Bog for 1806 (1806)
- Sange for Den Norske Bondestand (1812)
- Prædikener og Leilighedstaler (1822)
- Egenæs: et digt med anmærkninger (1825)
- 2den Deel (1825)
- Jens Zetlitz's samlede Digte (1825)
- 1ste deel (1825)
- Sange for den norske Bondestand (1842)
- Norske Almuesangeres Kløverblad: eller Bruns, Frimanns og Zetlit's Sange for den norske Bondestand. - Godtkjøbsudgave (1853)
- Ny Vise om Jernbanemoroen ved Mjøndalen (1875)
- Udvalg af Jens Zetlitz' Digte (1886)
- Reyse fra Stavanger til Wigedahl i aare (1968)
- Jens Zetlitz : et tohundreårsminne (1990)
