= Anna Cathrine Juel =

Danish businesswoman (1738–1809)

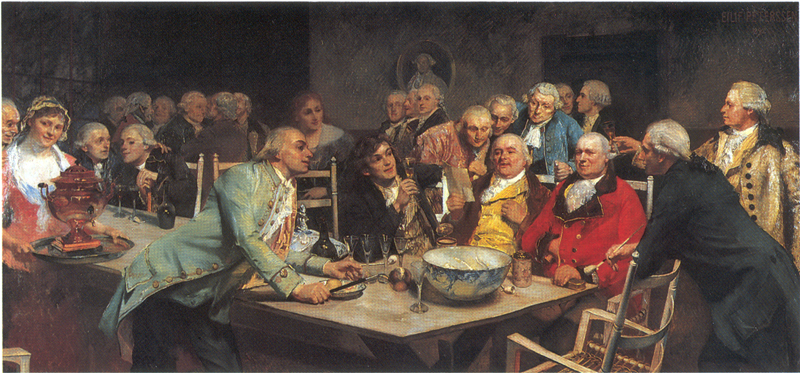
Painted by Eilif Peterssen in 1892: An evening at the Norwegian Society (En aften i Det norske Selskab). The man with the raised glass in the foreground is Johan Herman Wessel; the man with the red jacket is Johan Nordahl Brun. Behind Wessel is the hostess, Madam Juehl.

Anne Cathrine Juel (1738–1809) was a Danish businesswoman.

== Biography ==
She owned and managed a famous coffee house in Copenhagen, known as the meeting place of the Det norske Selskab from 1772 to 1792. She was a muse to many of the members of the society, and several poems are dedicated to her by its members.

In 2005, a memorial plaque was placed on the Thomas Angell House in Trondheim, where she died.
