= Sverre Næss =

Sverre Næss may refer to:

- Sverre Næss (actor)
- Sverre Næss (swimmer), participant in the 2014 FINA World Swimming Championships (25 m) – Men's 100 metre breaststroke among others
