= Claus Pavels =

Norwegian priest and diarist

The Right Reverend Claus Pavels
- Bishop
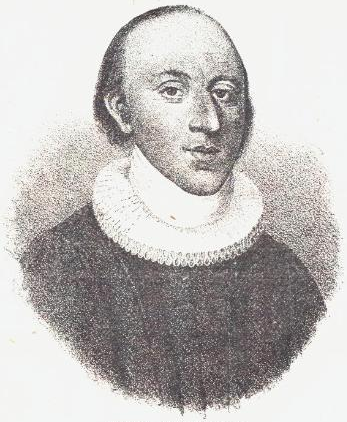
- Church: Church of Norway
- Diocese: Diocese of Bjørgvin

Personal details
- Born: 8 January 1769 Vanse, Norway
- Died: 16 February 1822 (aged 53)
- Denomination: Christian
- Occupation: Priest

Claus Pavels (8 January 1769 – 16 February 1822) was a Norwegian priest and diarist. His diaries from 1812 to 1822 are an important source for cultural and biographical history. He was the Bishop of the Diocese of Bjørgvin from 1817 until 1822.

== Early life and family ==
Pavels was born in Vanse in Southern Norway on 8 January 1769. His father, a priest at Vanse Church in Lista, died four months before Pavel's birth, and the boy grew up at his uncle's farm on Lista. He graduated from the school in Christanssand in 1785. He was a student in Copenhagen and member of The Norwegian Society there.

In 1799, he married Maren Fasland. The couple had two daughters. Their daughter Karen married Johan Lyder Brun, Sr., a grandson of Johan Nordahl Brun, who preceded Pavels as bishop of Bjørgvin. He was the grandfather of the author Claus Pavels Riis.

== Career ==
Pavels was hired as a chaplain in Brevig in Telemark county from 1793 to 1796. He next was called to be the priest in Hirschholm in Denmark from 1796 until 1799. From 1799 to 1805 he was a chaplain for the Nikolai parish in Copenhagen. In 1805, Pavels was given a new job in the Norwegian capital of Christiania. He was called to be the vicar of the parish of Aker as well as the priest serving Akershus Fortress. He served in that post until 1817 when he was named the Bishop of the Diocese of Bjørgvin. He remained at this post until his death on 16 February 1822.

== University ==
Pavels was host of the ceremony when the first Norwegian university, the Royal Frederick University of Christiania, was founded in 1811. The ceremony took place at Akershus Fortress 11 November 1811 when he was the priest for the Fortress. The ceremony included music, military parades, bell-ringing, and gun salute with people gathering in the Fortress Church.

Pavels was also present at the first defence of a doctorate thesis in Norway, at the University 18 June 1817, when Frederik Holst defended his thesis, "Morbus, quem Radesyge vocant, quinam sit, quanamque ratione e Scandinavia tollendus". Pavel's diary contains a detailed report from the ceremonious event. There were 13 opponents, and the language used was Latin. The thesis was not translated into Norwegian until 188 years later, and the book from 2005 contains also Pavel's diary comments.

== Politics in 1814 ==
From his position at Akershus Fortress, Pavels followed closely the political turbulence in 1814, with the Treaty of Kiel, the gathering of the Constituent Assembly at Eidsvoll Manor, the clash between Sweden and Norway, and the subsequent Union between Sweden and Norway. He wrote detailed reports from this period in his diaries.

Religious titles
Preceded by Johan Nordahl Brun	Bishop of Bjørgvin; 1817–1822	Succeeded by Jacob Neumann
