= Old Åsane Church =

Church in Vestland, Norway

- Åsane gamle kirke
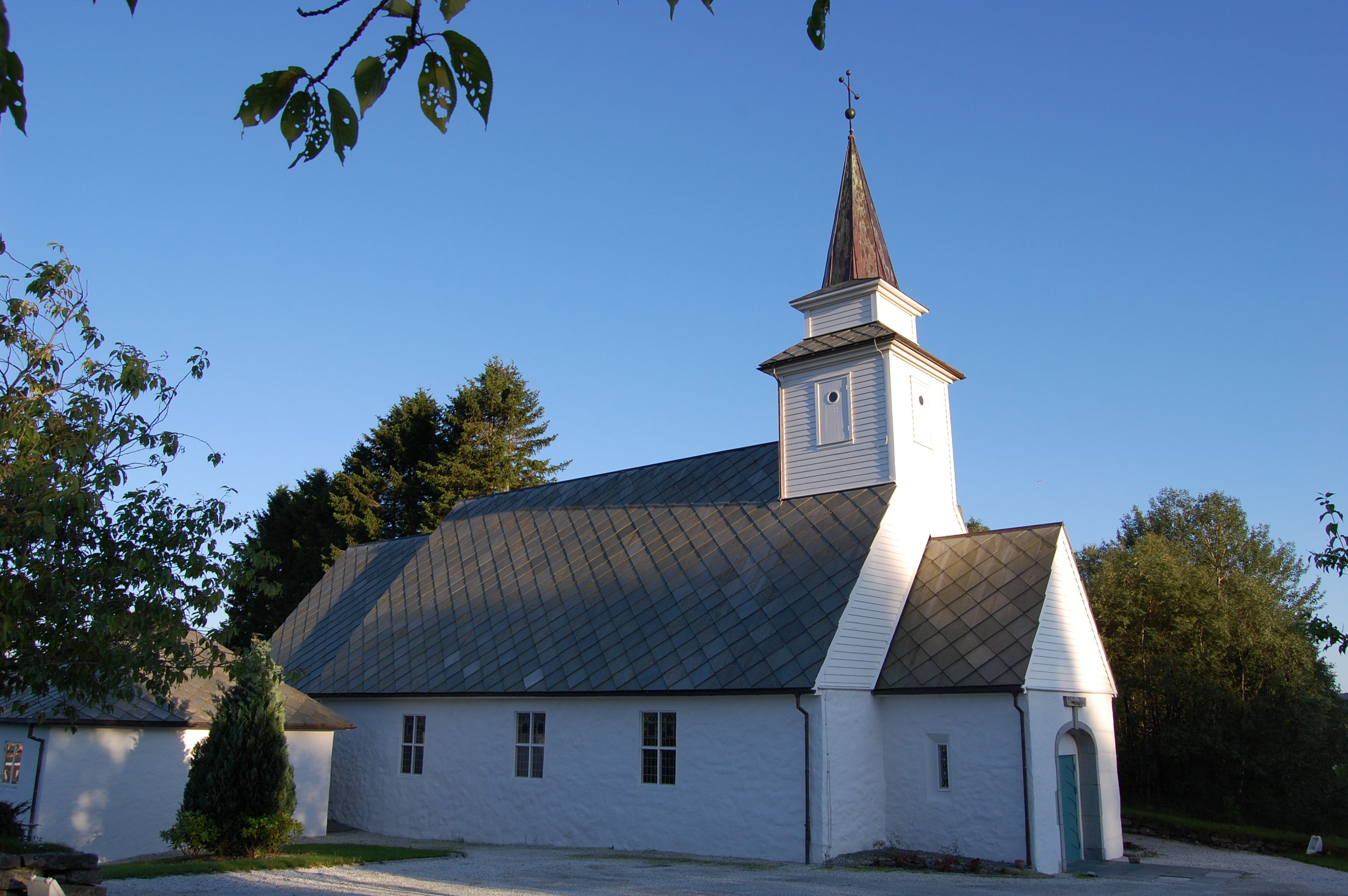
- View of the church
- Old Åsane Church
- 60°28′29″N 5°19′33″E
- Location: Bergen Municipality, Vestland
- Country: Norway
- Denomination: Church of Norway
- Previous denomination: Catholic Church
- Churchmanship: Evangelical Lutheran

History
- Status: Parish church
- Founded: 13th century
- Consecrated: 1795
- Events: 1992: Arson

Architecture
- Functional status: Active
- Architectural type: Long church
- Completed: 1795 (231 years ago)

Specifications
- Capacity: 240
- Materials: Stone

Administration
- Diocese: Bjørgvin bispedømme
- Deanery: Åsane prosti
- Parish: Åsane
- Norwegian Cultural Heritage Site
- Type: Church
- Status: Listed
- ID: 85991

Old Åsane Church (Norwegian: Åsane gamle kirke) is a former parish church of the Church of Norway in Bergen Municipality in Vestland county, Norway. It is located in the Saurås neighborhood in the borough of Åsane in the city of Bergen. It used to be the church for the Åsane parish, which is part of the Åsane prosti (deanery) in the Diocese of Bjørgvin. The white, stone church was built in a long church design in 1795 using plans drawn up by an unknown architect. The church seats about 240 people. The church was consecrated in 1795 by the Bishop Johan Nordahl Brun. The church is no longer regularly used since the "new" Åsane Church was built in 1993. This church is now mostly used for funerals and weddings as well as special events.

== Name ==
The church was historically called Aasene kirke (Åsane Church), but in the 20th century, it used the modern Norwegian spelling of Åsane kirke. Since the new Åsane Church was completed, the church has been known as the Åsane gamle kirke. The word gamle means "old".

== History ==
The earliest existing historical records of the church date back to the year 1598, but the chapel was not new that year. The first chapel in Åsane was wooden stave church that was likely built during the 13th century. The church was an annex chapel under the nearby Hamre Church for many centuries and it was used by people living on the Åsane peninsula. In 1695, the chapel was repaired and renovated by building a new timber-framed choir and a new roof. The old wooden chapel stood there for about 500 years, before it was torn down and replaced with a new stone church in 1795. The walls were stone covered in plaster, and the gables and tower were wooden. Local tradition says that the new stone church was erected around the outside of the old wooden building so that it could be used during the construction. The new church had a rectangular nave measuring about 7.8 by 11.5 metres (26 ft × 38 ft) and a narrower, rectangular choir measuring about 6.5 by 6.5 metres (21 ft × 21 ft). The stone walls of the church measure about 1 metre (3 ft 3 in) thick. The new church was consecrated in 1795 by the Bishop Johan Nordahl Brun.

In 1842, the tower was repaired and rebuilt, slightly taller. In 1866, the roof was repaired and covered with slate tiles. In 1867–1868, the church had a major restoration. It received a new floor, new chairs, and a new second floor seating gallery on the west end. In 1871, the chapel was designated as a church and it became a separate parish. In 1891–1893, the church was remodeled and enlarged. The nave was extended by about 4 metres (13 ft) to the west and a new 3.7-by-3.4-metre (12 ft × 11 ft) church porch was built on the west end of the nave. In 1935, the church was restored by Ole Landmark and had a large stone sacristy built perpendicular to the choir's north wall. Starting in the 1960s, discussions began about replacing the old church with a new, larger, more functional church for the quickly growing urban area of Åsane, but nothing was done at that point.

On Christmas Eve 1992, the church was set on fire by Jørn Tunsberg and Varg Vikernes and it sustained heavy damage. The roof and tower burned, but the thick stone walls and foundation remained. At this point, the parish determined a new church should be built, but that the historic church should be rebuilt as well. A new, larger Åsane Church was built about 1 kilometre (0.62 mi) to the south in 1993. After that, the old church was completely rebuilt using same foundation and stone walls. Old photographs and pictures of the church were used to make sure the replacement would be the same as before. The church building was replaced, but many historic artifacts and artwork were lost in the fire. The rebuilt church was re-consecrated on 19 November 1995 by the Bishop Ole Danbolt Hagesæther and at this point, the church was renamed as the "Old Åsane Church". Since being rebuilt, the church has been used for special occasions like weddings, funerals, and special services, but it is not regularly used.

== Media gallery ==
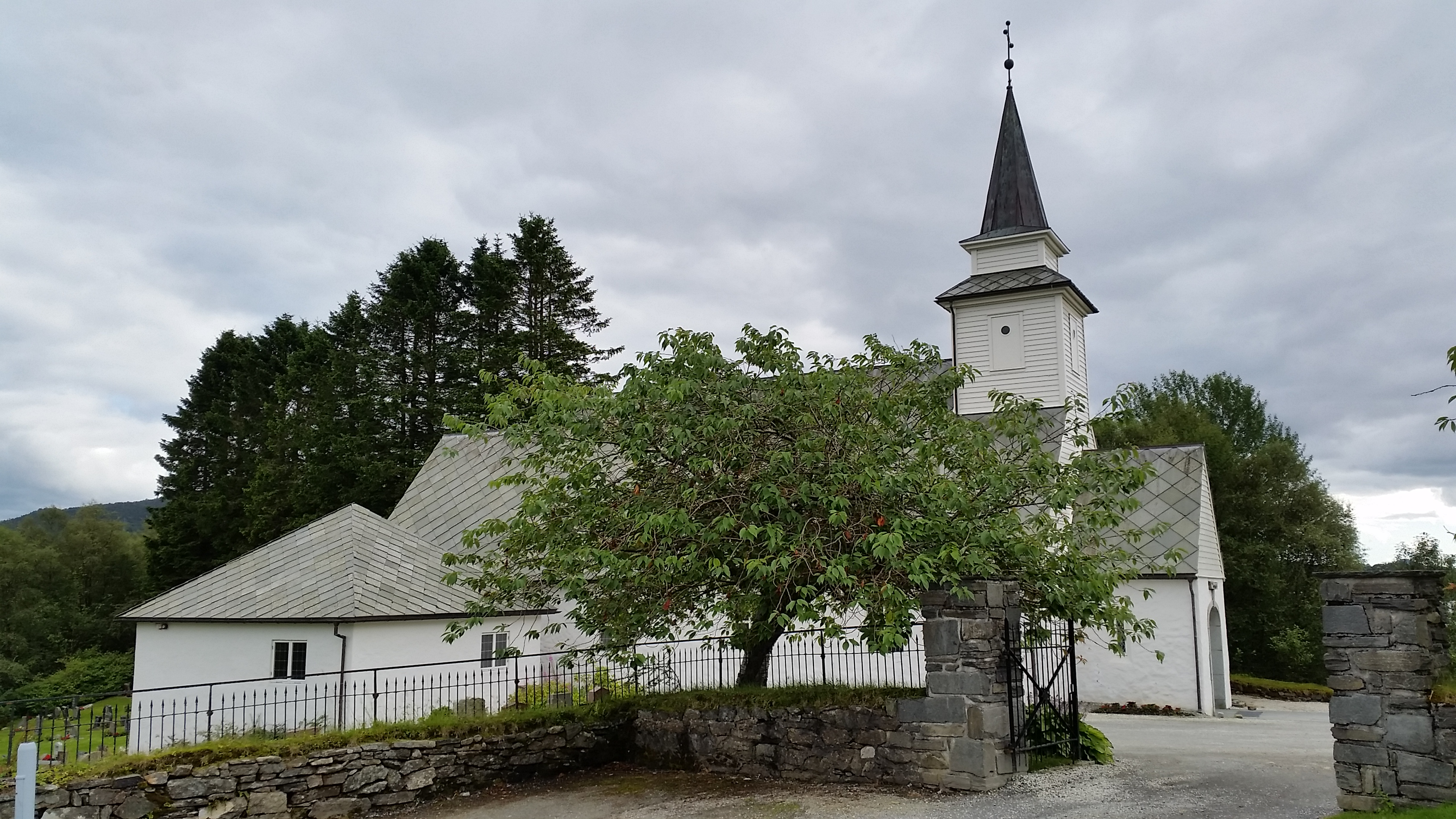

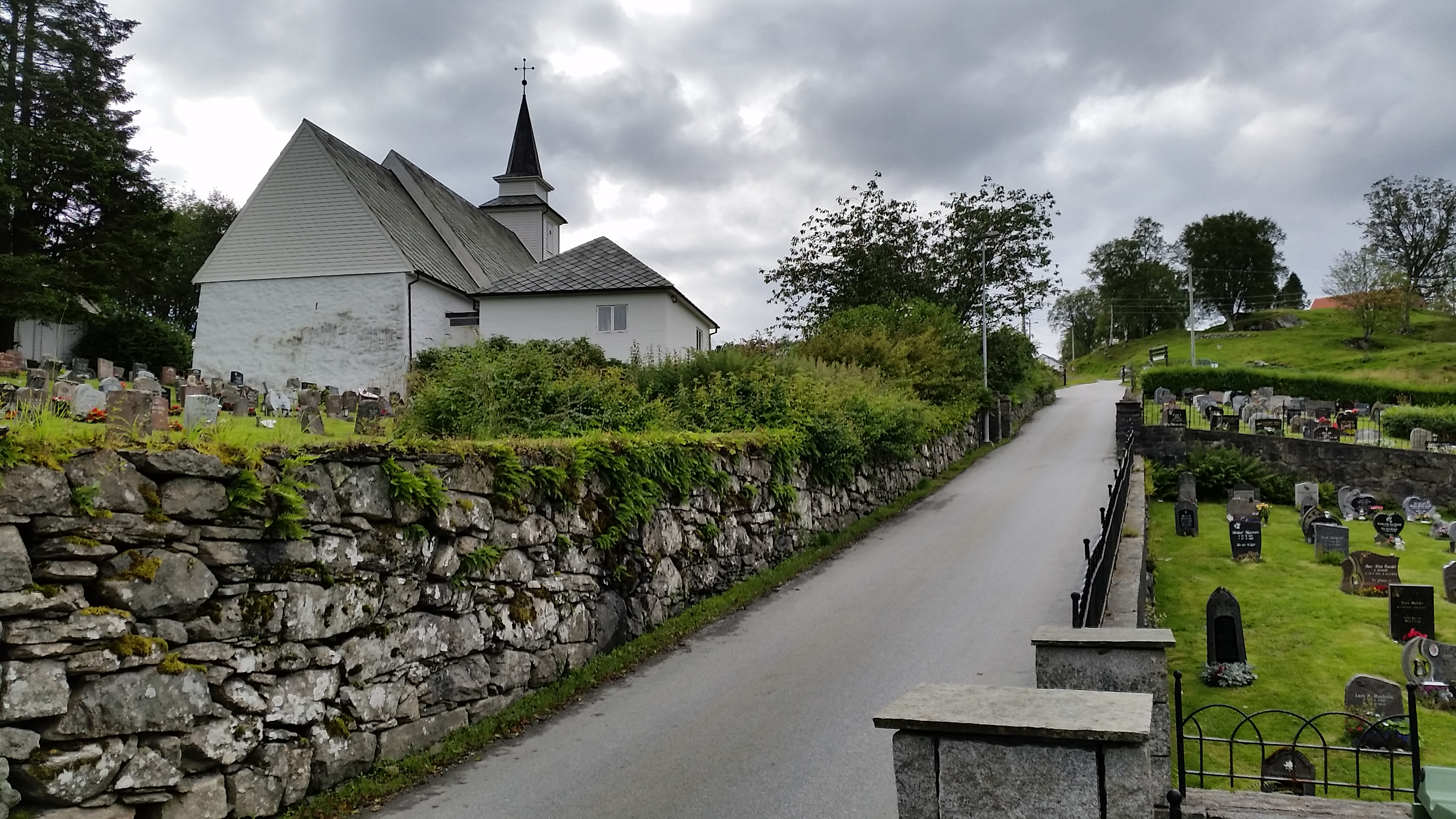

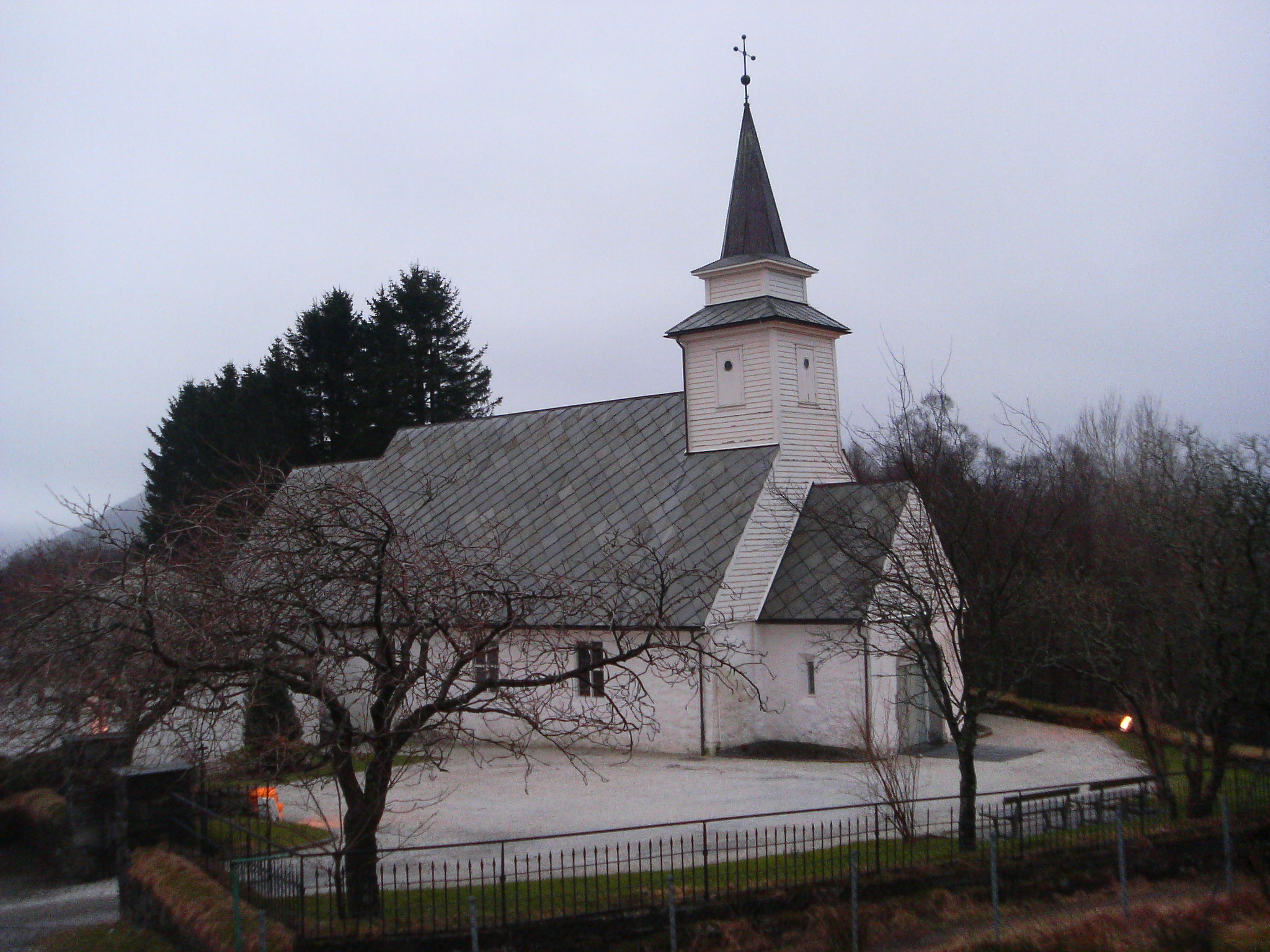

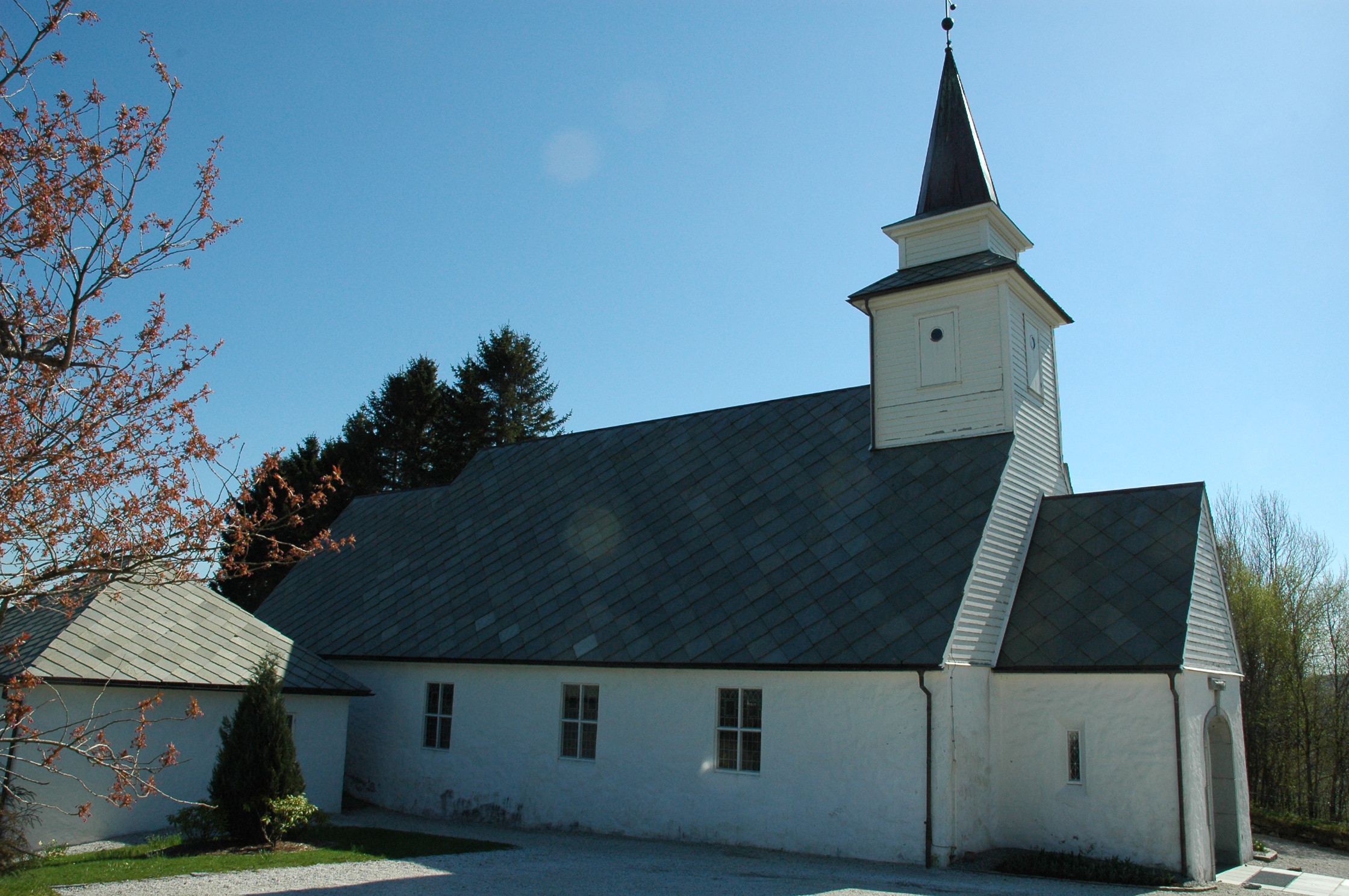

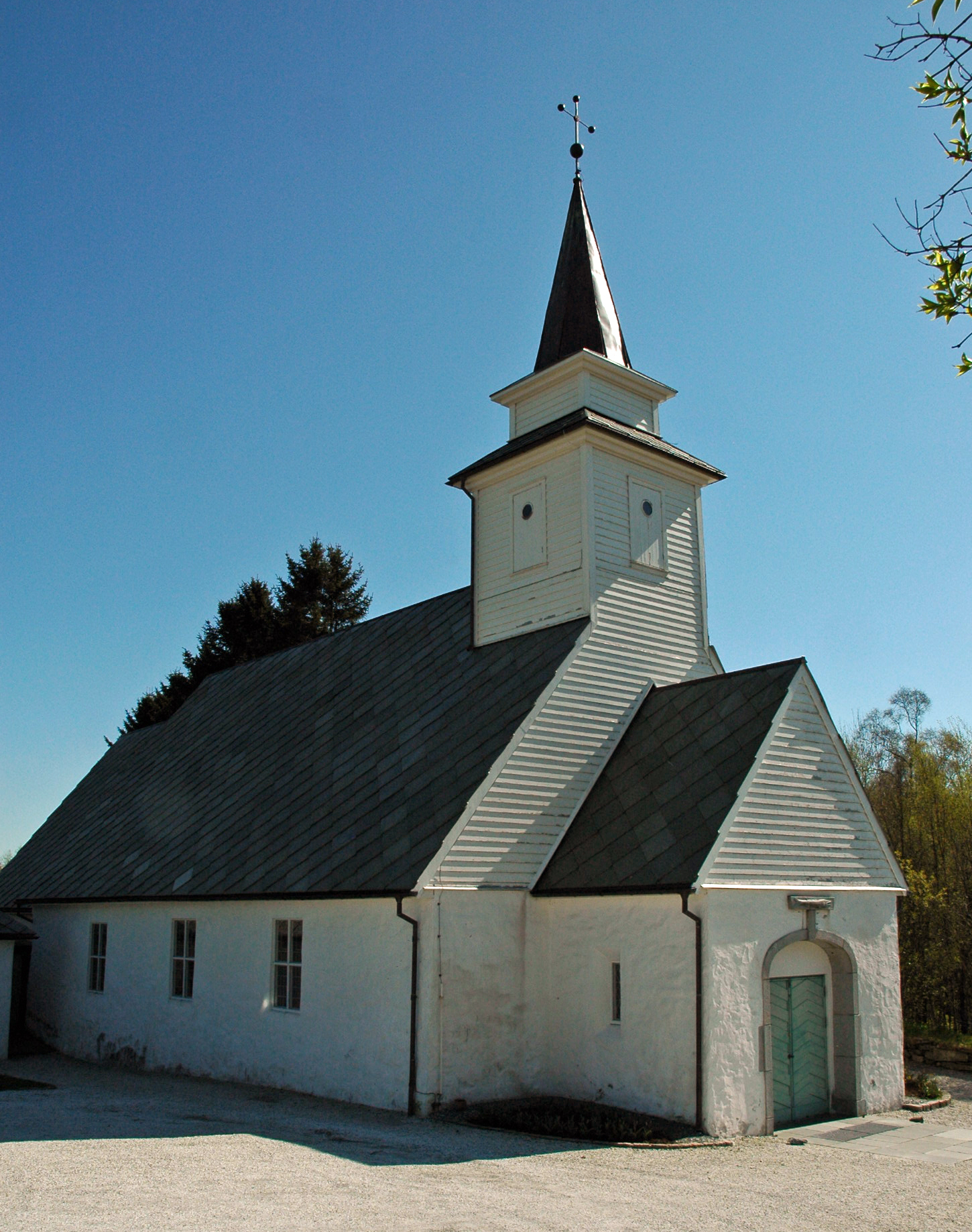

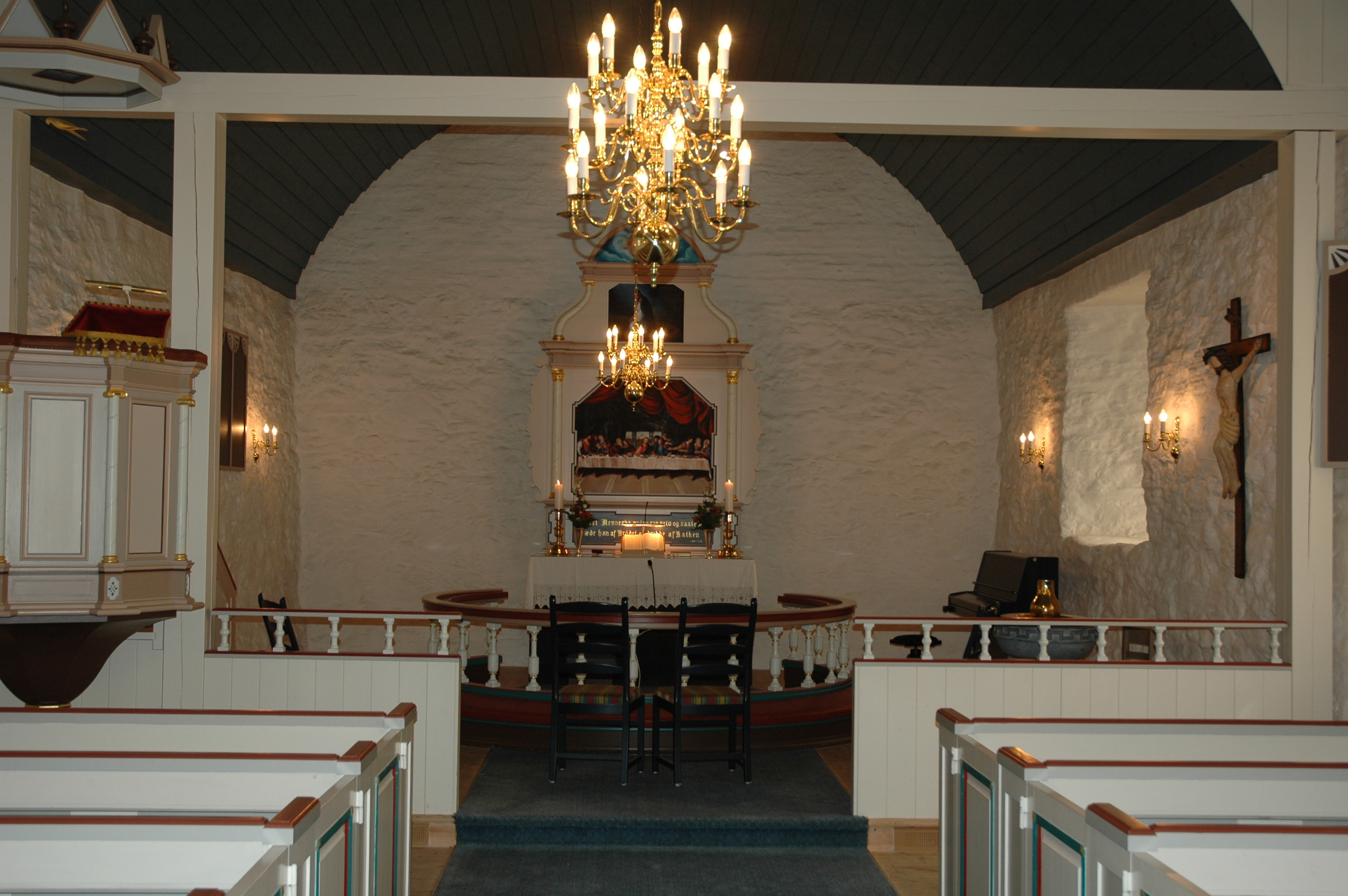

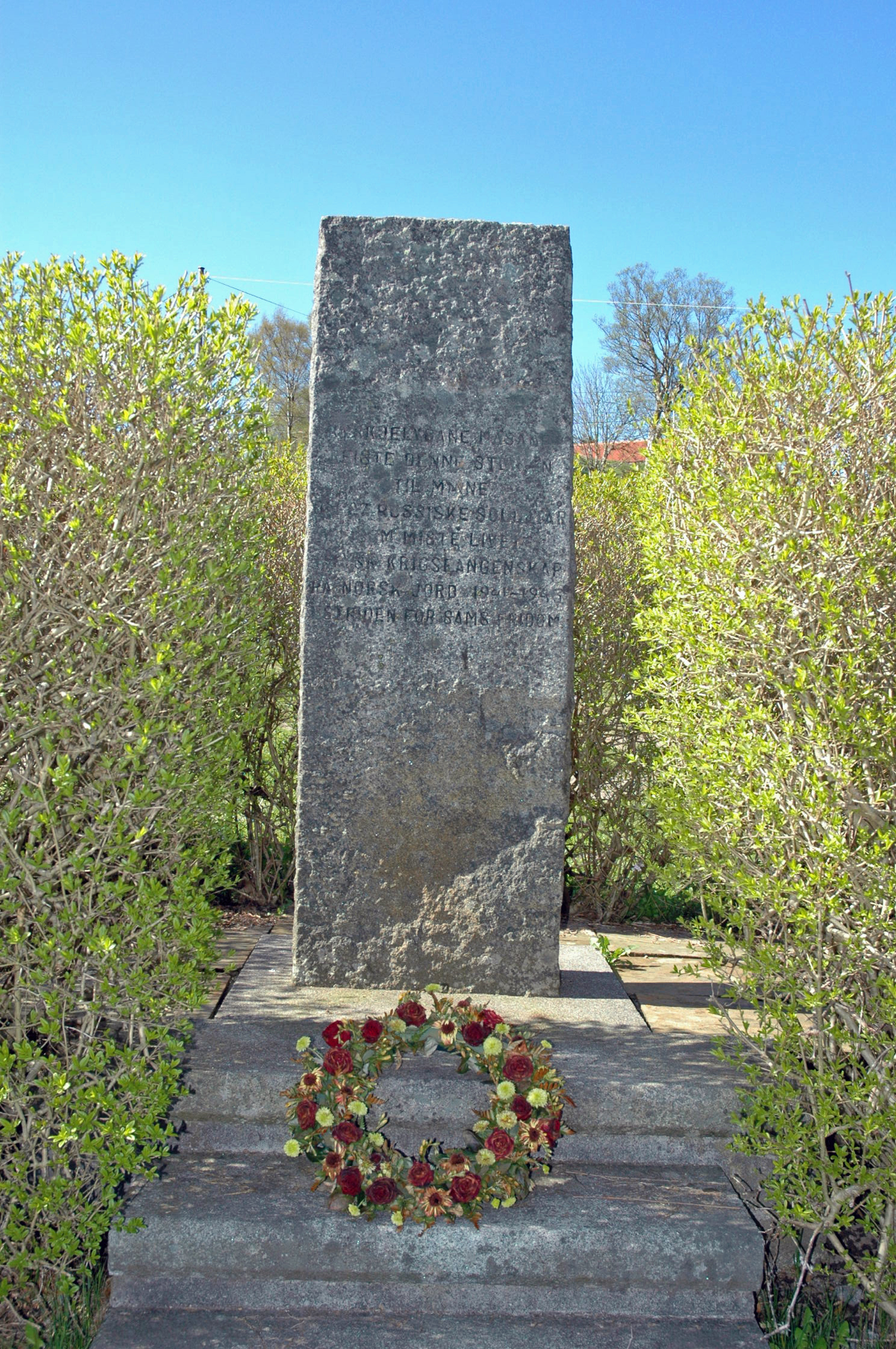

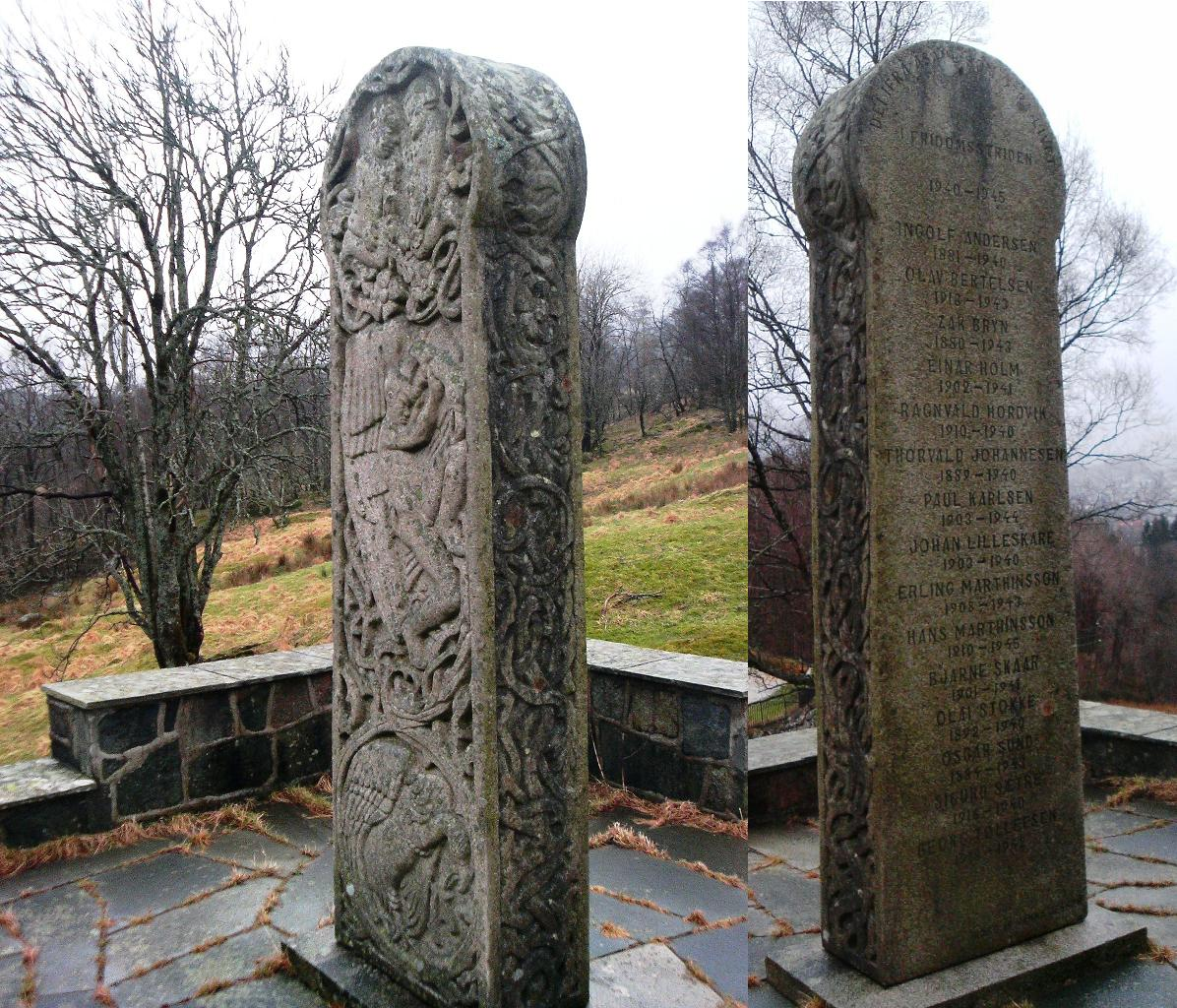

== See also ==
- List of churches in Bjørgvin
