= Claus Pavels Riis =

Norwegian author

- Born: February 19, 1826; Bergen, Norway
- Died: October 8, 1886 (aged 60); Mandal, Norway
- Spouse: Maria Elisabeth Weinwich Hertzberg
- Writing career
- Pen name: Crispinus
- Notable works: Til Sæters (1850), "Anne Knutsdotter" (1865)

Claus Pavels Riis (February 19, 1826 – October 8, 1886) was a Norwegian writer. He was born in Bergen and was the grandson of the priest and bishop Claus Pavels.

Riis is now best known for writing the poem "Eg heiter Anne Knutsdotter" (I Am Called Anne Knutsdotter, 1869). During his lifetime, he was a popular author of plays and student songs under the pseudonym Crispinus before he settled on the island of Tysnesøya as a landowner and gardener.

Riis's play Til Sæters: dramatisk Idyl med Sange (To the Mountain Pastures: A Dramatic Idyll with Songs, 1850) was very popular on Norwegian stages for many years. This work was the basis for the silent comedy film Til sæters, which premiered in 1924.

In the 1860s, Riis published his grandfather's autobiography and diaries. Claus Pavels's diaries are an important contribution to Norwegian historiography from circa 1814.

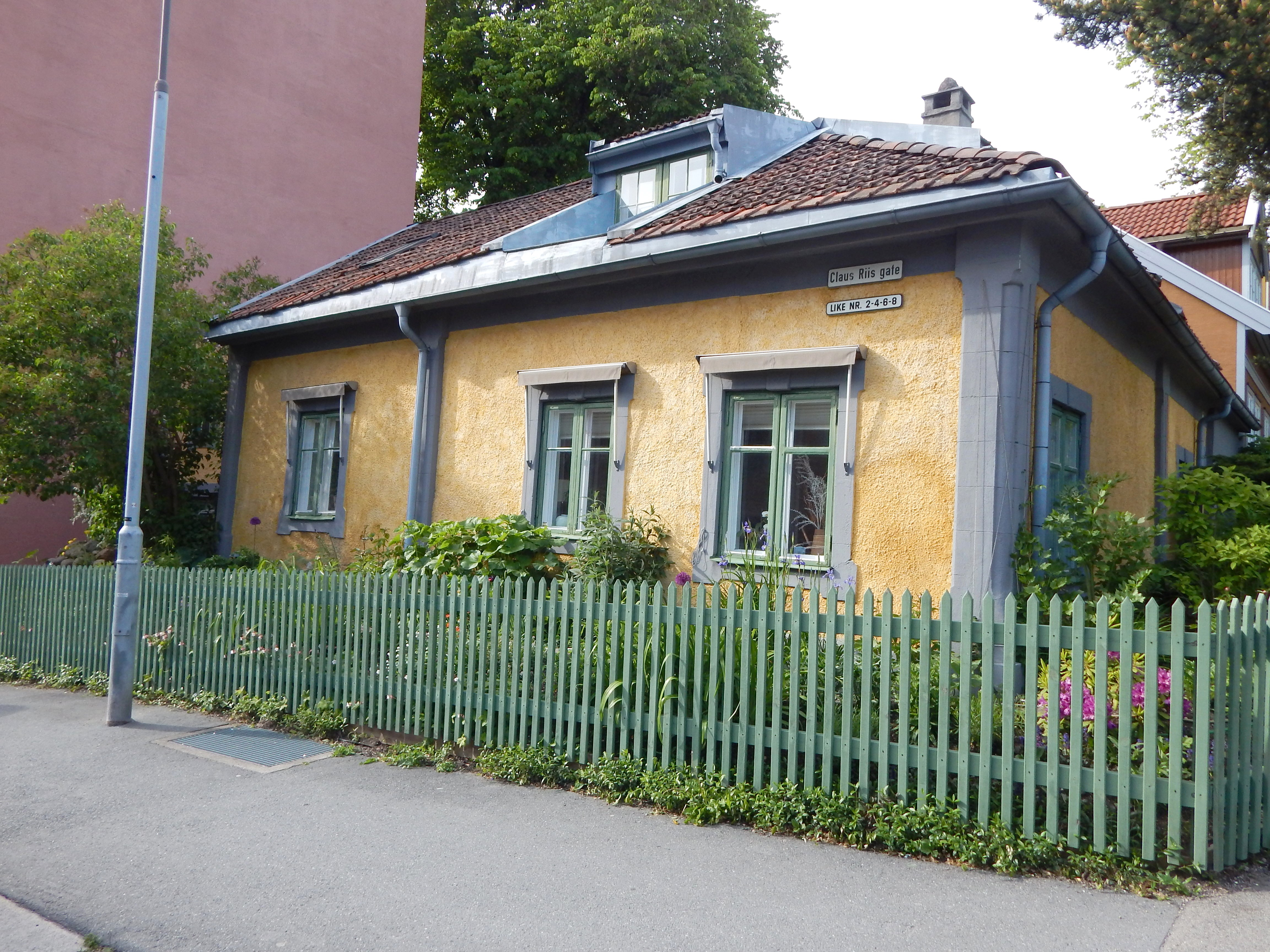
Claus Riis gate in Oslo

The street Claus Riis gate in Oslo's Ila neighborhood is named after Claus Riis.
