= Udsikter fra Ulriken =

Town song of Bergen, Norway

"Udsigter fra Ulriken" (English: 'Views from Ulriken') is the town song of Bergen, Norway. It is also known as "Bergenssangen", "Bergensiana", "Jeg tok min nystemte" and among the public "Nystemten". The lyrics were written in 1790 by the priest, politician and poet Johan Nordahl Brun when he worked as vicar at Bergen Cathedral (later he became bishop of Bjørgvin). The melody is taken from an old French minuet. Norwegian composer Johan Halvorsen wrote orchestral variations on the melody under the name "Bergensiana". A notable performance was by Sissel Kyrkjebø in 1986, when she was 16 years old. It was her big breakthrough. She performed the song during the intermission of the Eurovision Song Contest 1986, which took place in Grieg Hall in Bergen.

== Lyrics ==
Sang til Bergen (English: 'Song to Bergen')

by Johan Nordahl Brun (Udsigter fra Ulriken)

I
Jeg tog min nystemte Cithar i Hænde;
Sorgen forgik mig pa Ulrikens Top.
Tænkte paa Bauner, om de skulde Brænde,
og byde Mandskab mot Fienden op;
følede Freden, blev glad i min Aand,
og greb til min Cithar med legende Haand.
II
Værdige, gamle, graaskallede Bierge,
I, som omgierde min Fædrene-Bye,
I, som saa mangen en Torden afværge,
og sønderbryde electriske Skye!
Yndig er dalen, I hegne mig ind,
og Foraar og Dalen oplive mit Sind.
III
Herfra fortryllende Syner jeg skuer,
Lungegaards Vandet, den Slette saa blaa,
Nyegaards Alleens løvkronede Buer,
derunder prydede Skiønne at gaae,
deromkring Markens dens festlige Dragt,
det Guld i det Grønne den blomstrende Pragt!
IV
Tæt ved mig Alrikstads dobbelte Slette,
Kongeborg fordum og brugbar til Strid,
skiøn af Naturen, om Fortrin vil trette
med selve Nyegaard, som prunker med Flid,
der løb fra Svartedig skummende Aae,
der saae jeg Møllehiul flittig at gaae.
V
Bedre frem, Bergen, det Handelens Sæde,
strækkende Arme om seilbare Vaag.
Derhen høifarmede Jægter med Glæde
rustes hver Sommer til dobbelte Tog;
derfra gaae Skibe saa vide om Land;
der kiøber, der sælger, der handler hver Mand.
VI
Der seer jeg Skoven af Masterne høie,
handlende Stuers bredvaiende Flag;
Vippebom seer jeg sig flittig at bøie,
flittig at hæve. – Tagenternes Slag
paa dette Handels-Claveer gav Musik,
og Vare af Skuderne dandsende gik.
VII
Nu tog jeg Vand af den springende Kilde.
herudaf Oldtidens Kiempeslægt drak.
Naar de lykønske sit Fædreland vilde,
Sverdet af Skeden tillige de trak.
Vee! den, saa sang de, saa synger jeg og,
den Nidding, som Sverd imot Fødeland drog.
VIII
Freden, o! Bergen! din Rede beskierme,
Sommeren krone hver Ager med Brød!
Ilden og Sverdet dig aldrig fornærme,
Havet dig aapne sit frugtbare Skiød!
Da mellem Biergene syv skal du staae,
naar nybaget Kiøbstad i Luften maa gaae.
IX
Jeg drak den Skaal, som mig Ulriken skienkte,
drikker den samme, I, som have Viin!
Hver, som oprigtig mod Fødeby tænkte;
Lod denne Munterheds Skaal være sin.
Held for vort Bergen, for Fødeland Held!
Gid alting maa blomstre fra Fiere til Fiel

English translation of the first verse

I
Holding my newly tuned sitar in my hands;
all my grief left me on the peak of Ulriken.
Thought of the beacons if they would be lighted,
and against foes order out the marching men.
Felt the calm upon me, rejoiced in my spirit,
and reached for my sitar with playful hands.
