= Magdalene Sophie Buchholm =

Norwegian poet (1758–1825)

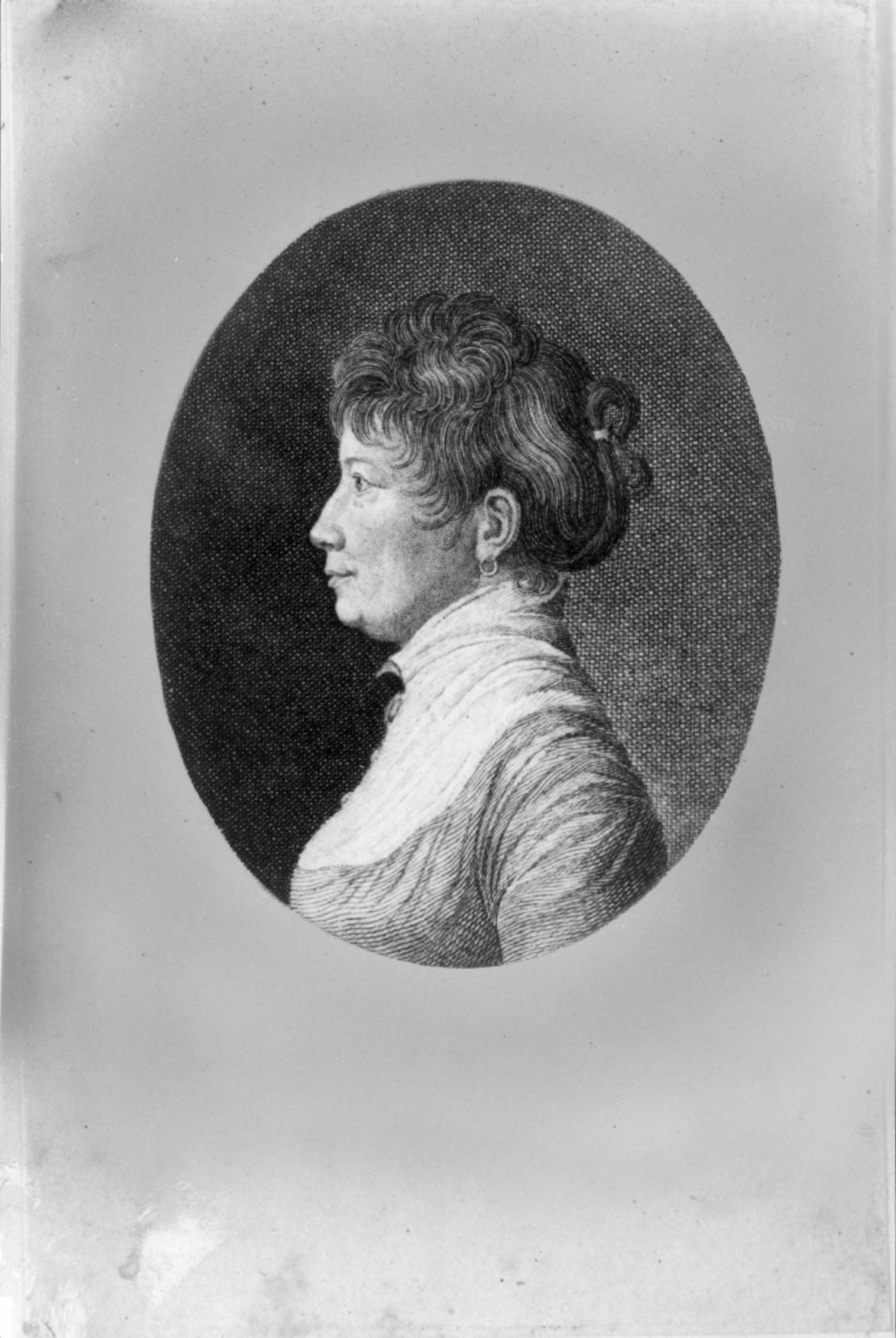
- Born: March 15, 1758; Skien, Telemark, Norway
- Died: August 12, 1825 (aged 66–67); Kragerø, Telemark, Norway
- Occupation: Poet

Magdalene Sophie Buchholm (15 March 1758 – 12 August 1825) was an 18th-century Norwegian poet. She was the only acknowledged female Norwegian writer of her time, and the only female in the academic society Det Norske Selskab.

== Biography ==
Magdalene Buchholm was born in Skien in Telemark, Norway. She was the daughter of mayor Mogens Bentsen (1715–70) and Sophie Hellesdatter (1720–98). After his father's death in 1770, she lived for several years at Buskerud Manor (Buskerud Hovedgård) with her cousin Johanne Henrikke Ancher (1750–1812), who was the second wife of the owner Peter Collett (1740–86).

She married vicar Peter Leganger Castberg (1752–1784) in 1777. In 1781 her husband was appointed parish priest in Flekkefjord, where he died three years later. After his death, she married the merchant and custom inspector Joachim Frederik Buchholm (1762–1834) in 1785. Her second spouse became a custom inspector in Stavanger in 1798 and Kragerø in 1806. The couple became centers of these towns' society life.

She made frequent and long-term trips to Copenhagen. In 1778, she was inducted in the academic society Det Norske Selskab, becoming the first female member of the society. In 1783, she was awarded by Det Norske Selskab for her poetry. Her work was included in a publication by the academy and she was given the name "Sappho of the North". She published a collection of almost all of her works in 1793.
