= Jonas Rein =

Norwegian priest, poet and member of the Norwegian Constituent Assembly

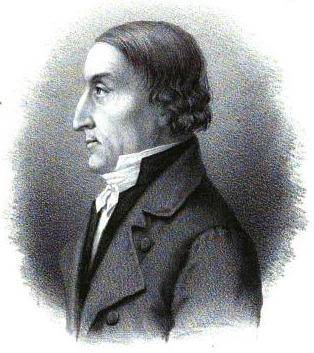
Jonas Rein

Jonas Rein (30 January 1760 – 21 November 1821) was a Norwegian priest, poet and member of the Norwegian Constituent Assembly at Eidsvoll in 1814.

== Background ==
He was born at Øksendal in Møre og Romsdal, Norway. He was the son of parish priest Ole Rein (1729–1792) and his wife Margretha Hansdatter Ross. She died two weeks after Jonas' birth. In 1763 the family moved to Jevnaker, where his father was hired as vicar. Rein took his examen artium in 1777, and studied at the University of Copenhagen. He started studying theology, but soon switched to literature and philosophy. He graduated in 1780. While a student in Copenhagen, he was a member of the Norwegian Society (Det Norske Selskab), a literary society for Norwegian students in the city.

== Career ==
In 1780 Rein returned to Norway, working mostly as a private tutor. He debuted as a playwright, but the play did not reach the stage. In 1787 he returned to Denmark to seek a post as a civil servant. After one rejection, he took the cand.philol. degree in 1789. He was appointed as vicar of northern Kautokeino Church in 1791, but never assumed office; instead he chose to become curate at the Skjeberg Church in 1792. He left in 1799, and in 1800 he became vicar in Eidanger Church and Brevik Church. From 1808, he was the vicar of Nykirken in Bergen. In the meantime Rein had developed into a recognized poet. He published the poetry collections Samlede Digte (two volumes, 1802) and Nyeste Digte (1810).

In 1814 he was elected to the Norwegian Constituent Assembly at Eidsvoll Manor as a representative with the Bergen deputation, which was led by Wilhelm Frimann Koren Christie. He favored the Independence Party (Selvstendighetspartiet), and held animosity towards the proposed Union between Sweden and Norway. The Constituent Assembly elected Crown Prince Christian Frederick of Denmark as King of Norway. However, after the Swedish campaign against Norway during the summer, Norway came into a loose personal union with Charles III John as King . Rein's anti-Swedish sentiments might have cost him the position of Bishop of Bergen, which became vacant in 1816. In 1817 he co-founded the patriotic magazine Den norske Tilskuer together with Christian Magnus Falsen and Herman Foss.

== Personal life ==
Rein was married twice. In December 1791 he married Anna Cathrine Arbo (1756–1794), a grand-aunt of painter Peter Nicolai Arbo. In February 1796 in Berg he married Fredrikke Bergersen (1779–1856). He had six daughters. He died in November 1821 in Bergen, and was buried at Nykirkegården.

== Legacy ==
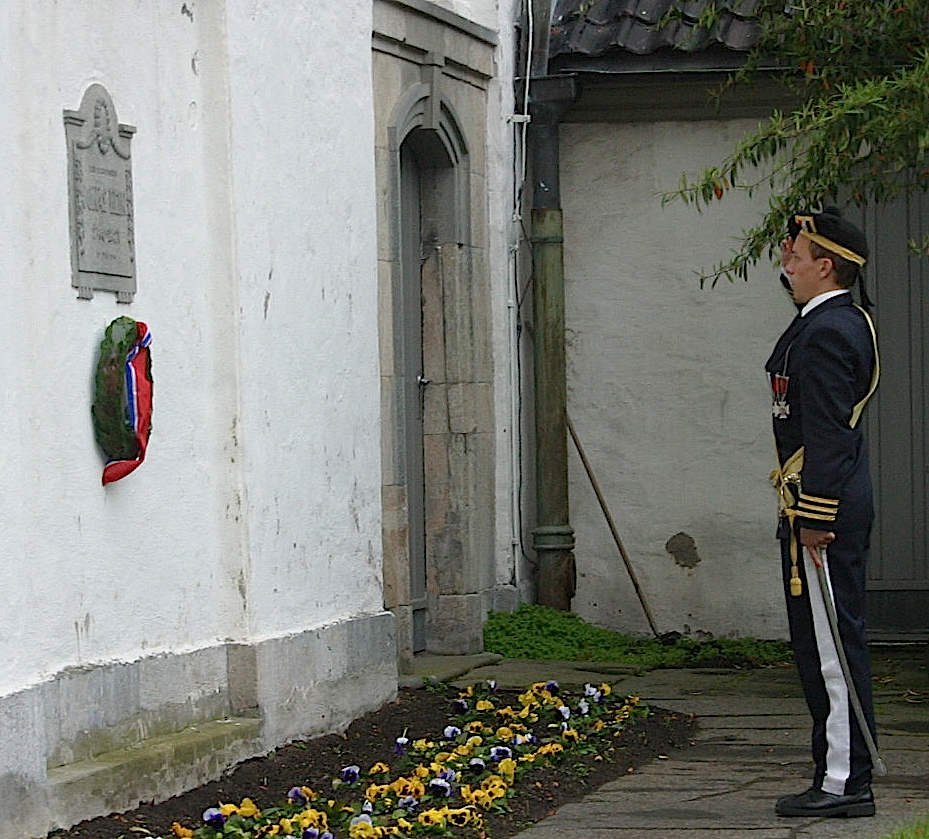
Memorial for Jonas Rein on the Nykirken wall

At Nykirken in Bergen (Nykirken i Bergen) there is a memorial that is decorated every May 17 by the command of the Nordnæs Bataillon in commemoration of Rein's service to Norway. In 1882, a street at Nygård in Bergen (Jonas Reins gate) was named after him.
