= Ove Gjerløw Meyer =

Ove Gjerløw Meyer (c. 1742 – 4 November 1790) was a Norwegian jurist and government official, best known for founding the Norwegian Society.

== Career ==
He was born around 1742, probably in Frederikshald (now Halden in Østfold, Norway). His father was headmaster and priest Edvard Offesen Meyer (1713–1760); the identity of his mother is not known. Meyer attended Christiania Cathedral School between 1759 and 1762 together with Norwegian folk poets Johan Herman Wessel and Johan Vibe. He then enrolled at the University of Copenhagen and took both the cand.jur. and cand.theol. degrees. After this he worked as a writer and private tutor in Copenhagen.

During the "de facto regency" of royal physician Johann Friedrich Struensee (between 1770 and 1772), royal censorship was lifted and Meyer marked himself as a Norwegian patriot. He is recognized as the founder of the Norwegian Society (Det Norske Selskab), a literary society for Norwegians in the city. The first meeting of the society took place on 30 April 1772. Among Meyer's primary concerns was that Norway did not have a university of its own. Like many members of the Norwegian Society, Meyer also wrote poems, but these have not stood the test of time, according to professor and literary historian Harald Noreng.

In 1778, he returned to Norway to become stipendiary magistrate of Tønsberg and Holmestrand. In December 1779, he married Susanne Fredrikke Hansen (1761–1785), daughter of a merchant in Holmestrand. From his seat in Tønsberg, Meyer wrote the publication Noget om Kjøbstaden Tønsbergs Forfatning in 1788. He wrote of the city's long history as well as its contemporary situation, and proposed the establishment of a Norwegian university in Tønsberg—however, this was first printed in 1822, eleven years after the Royal Frederick University was established in Christiania. Meyer would not live to see this happen; in 1790 he was promoted to presiding judge of Tønsberg and Fredrikstad, and to assessor of the court trial in Christiania in the same year. He had barely assumed the latter position before he died in November 1790. He was buried in Tønsberg.
