= Sigrun Svenningsen =

Norwegian actress (1902–1971)

- Born: June 23, 1902; Kristiania, Norway
- Died: February 24, 1971 (aged 68)
- Occupation: Actress
- Spouse: Per Kvist

Sigrun Svenningsen (June 23, 1902 – February 24, 1971) was a Norwegian actress.

Svenningsen was born in Kristiania (now Oslo), the daughter of the traveling salesman Sigurd Svenningsen (1875–1901) and Karen Beate Hoff (1869–?). She had a successful stage career, including as the lead actress at the Chat Noir cabaret in the 1920s. She also performed the lead role in the successful revue Ikke mas, alle får (Don't Worry, Everyone Will Get Some) in 1925 and 1926.

Svenningsen appeared in only two silent films. She debuted in 1924 in Harry Ivarson Til sæters, in which she played a major role as Sigrid. In 1927 Svenningsen appeared in Ivarson's Den glade enke i Trangvik.

Svenningsen was married to the actor Per Kvist.

== Filmography ==
- 1924: Til sæters
- 1927: Den glade enke i Trangvik
