= Åsane Church =

Church in Vestland, Norway

- Åsane kirke
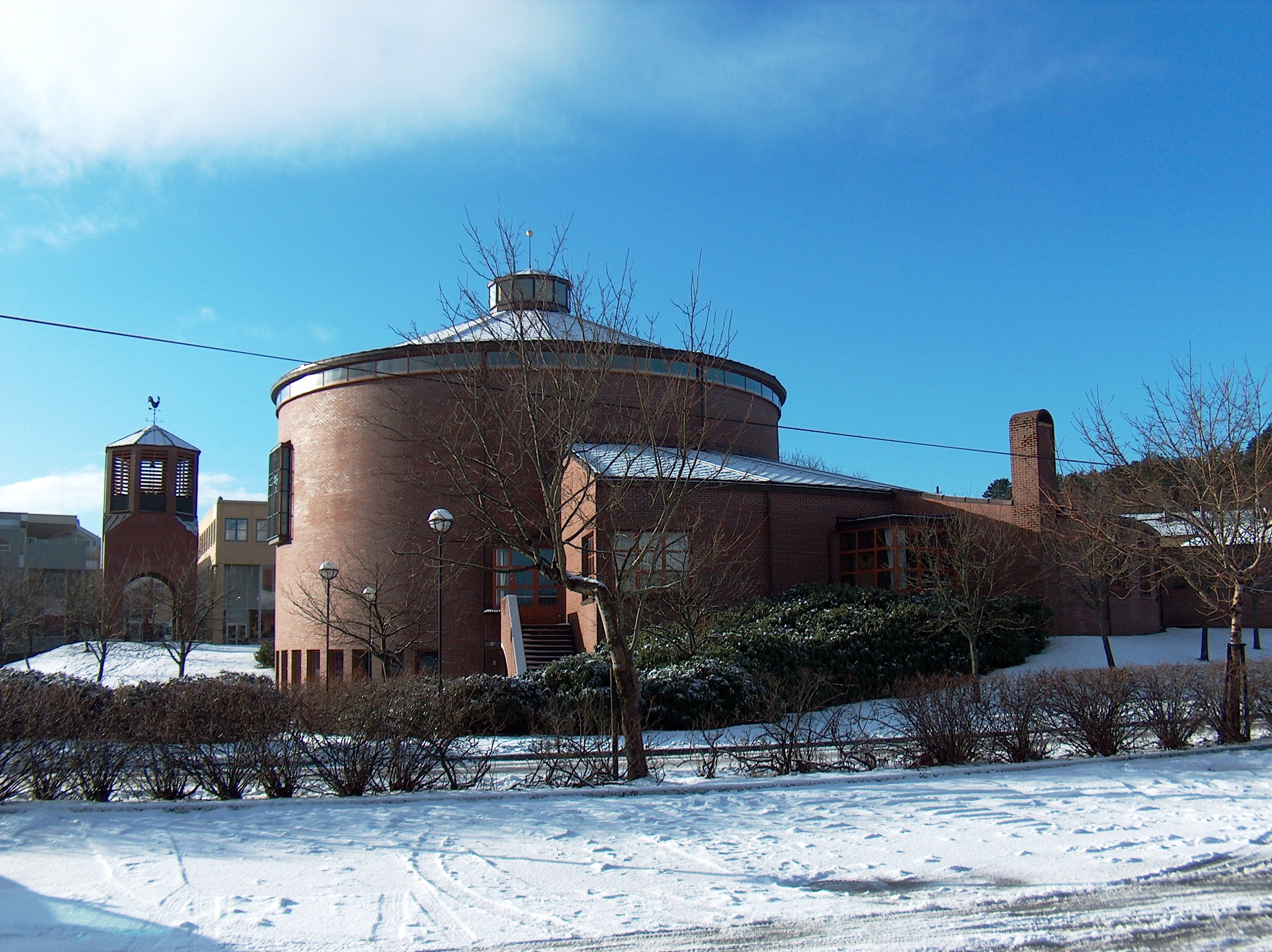
- View of the church
- Åsane Church
- 60°28′01″N 5°19′20″E
- Location: Bergen Municipality, Vestland
- Country: Norway
- Denomination: Church of Norway
- Churchmanship: Evangelical Lutheran

History
- Status: Parish church
- Founded: 1993
- Consecrated: 19 Dec 1993

Architecture
- Functional status: Active
- Architect: Trygve Dyngeland
- Architectural type: Circular
- Completed: 1993 (33 years ago)

Specifications
- Capacity: 600
- Materials: Brick

Administration
- Diocese: Bjørgvin bispedømme
- Deanery: Åsane prosti
- Parish: Åsane

Åsane Church (Norwegian: Åsane kirke) is a parish church of the Church of Norway in Bergen Municipality in Vestland county, Norway. It is located in the borough of Åsane in the city of Bergen. It is the church for the Åsane parish which is part of the Åsane prosti (deanery) in the Diocese of Bjørgvin. The large, red, brick church was built in a circular design in 1993 using plans drawn up by the architect Trygve Dyngeland. The church seats about 600 people. The church was built to replace the Old Åsane Church which had recently had a large fire.

== History ==
On 24 December 1992, the Old Åsane Church burned down in an arson attack connected with the early Norwegian black metal scene. This incident sped up plans for building a new, larger church for Åsane to replace the old stone church from 1795. Plans immediately began for a new church on a site about 1 kilometre (0.62 mi) to the south of the old church site.

The new building was designed by Trygve Dyngeland in the architectural firm Aall, Løkeland and Ragde. The new church was designed to be much larger than the old church. The main nave of the church was to hold about 350 people (about 100 more people than the old church). There would also be adjoining rooms with movable walls, so the seating can expand up to about 600 people as needed. The new church is also more functional than the previous church with a kitchen, office space, a fellowship hall, not to mention the addition of bathroom facilities which were not available in the old church. The basement of the church can fit up to 400 people for other social gatherings. This new church was consecrated on 19 December 1993.

After the new church was completed, the old church was rebuilt using the stone walls and foundations that survived the fire.

== Media gallery ==
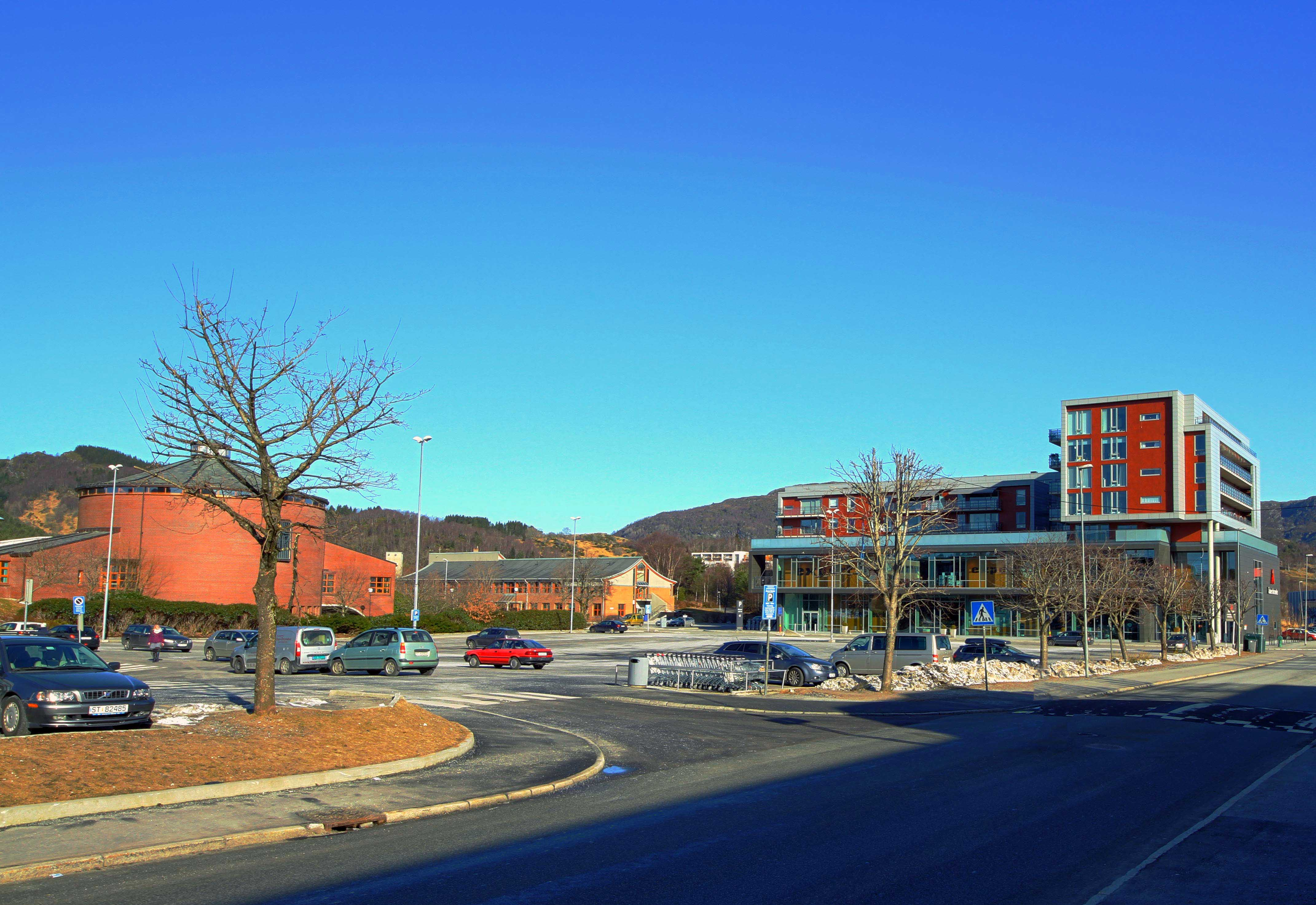

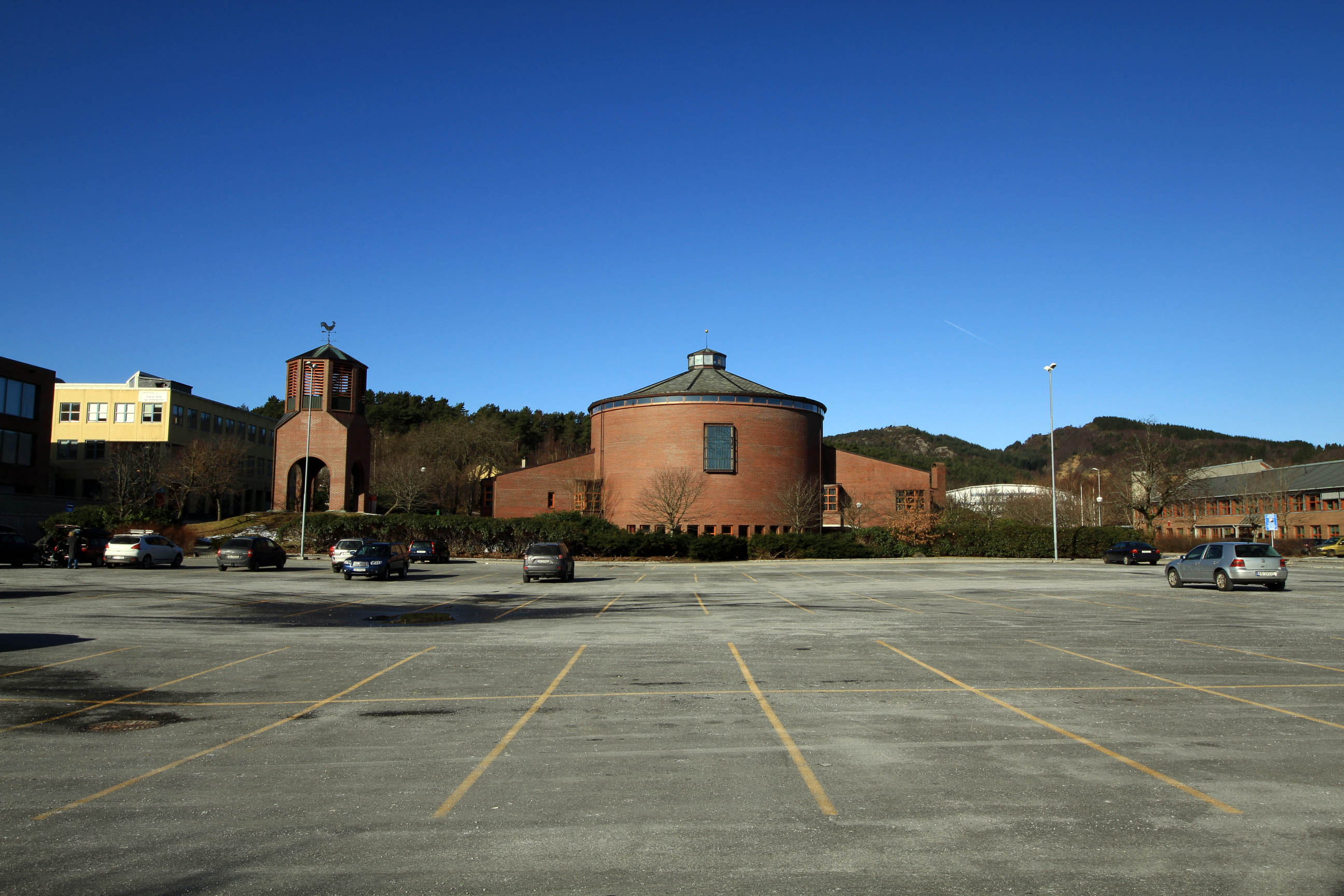

== See also ==
- List of churches in Bjørgvin
