= Stavanger Konserthus =

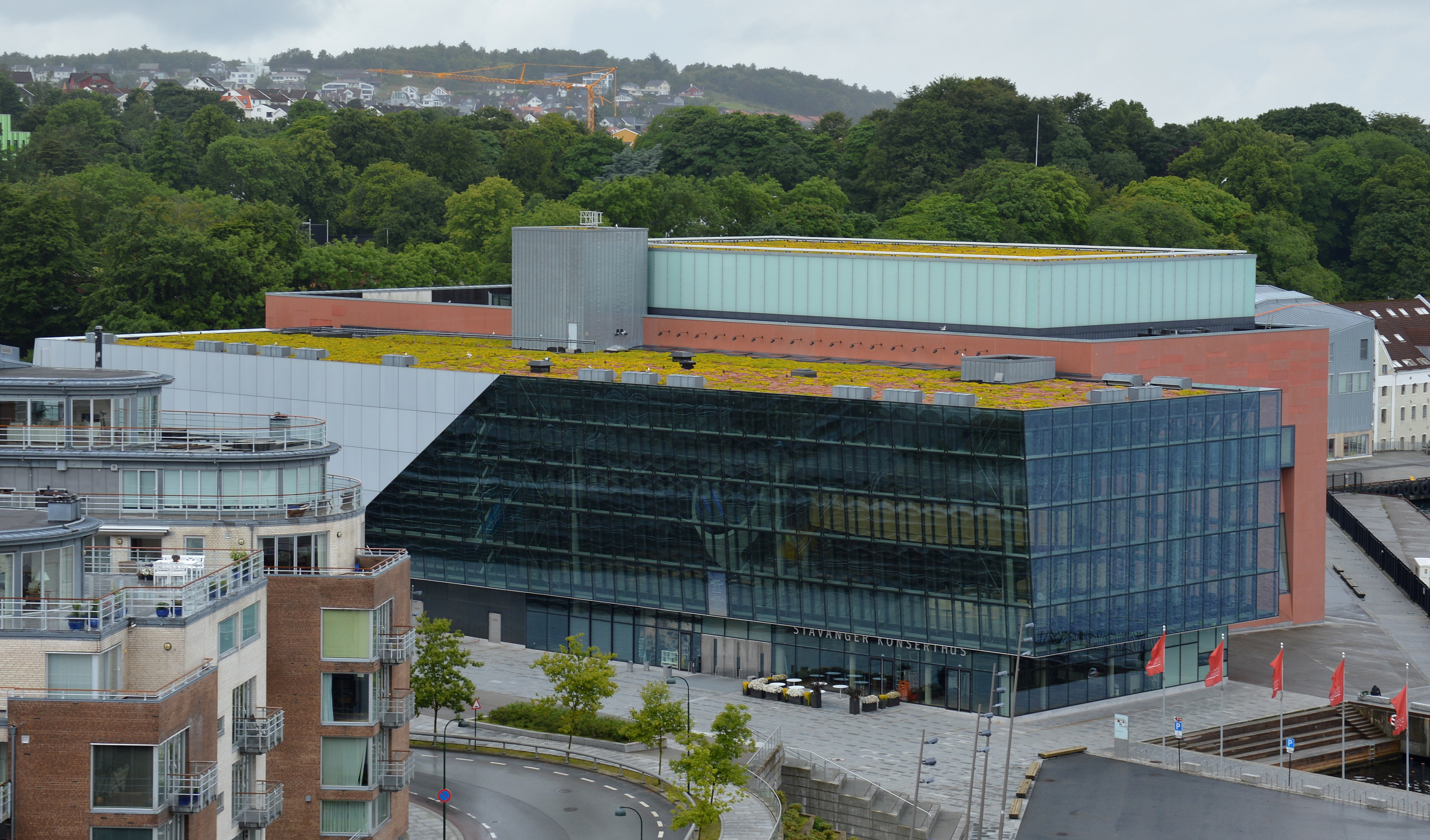
- Interactive map of the Stavanger Konserthus area

General information
- Type: Concert Hall
- Location: Stavanger, Norway
- Coordinates: 58°58′36.930″N 5°43′10.895″E
- Inaugurated: 15 September 2012

Design and construction
- Architect: RATIO Arkitekter AS

Other information
- Seating capacity: 1,500 (orchestra hall); 1,700 (multi-purpose hall)

Website
- Official website

Stavanger Konserthus or Stavanger Concert Hall is a concert hall in Stavanger, Norway.

It was officially opened by Crown Prince Haakon on 15 September 2012. The financing of the building was shared by the municipality of Stavanger, the county of Rogaland, the Norwegian government and private sponsors at a cost of 1.225 billion Norwegian kroner.

The concert hall has two halls, an orchestra hall and a multi-purpose hall with excellent acoustics, great foyer areas out to the seaside and a large outdoor amphitheater. It can be arranged symphony concert in one hall and a rock concert in the other - at the same time. Architects were RATIO Arkitekter AS.

== Fartein Valen orchestra hall ==
The orchestra hall is named after the composer Fartein Valen. It is specially designed for acoustic music and will become the new home of Stavanger Symphony Orchestra. There are 1,500 seats in the stalls (orchestra section) and the three galleries. The hall has 12 entrances at five different levels. The hall is equipped with an organ built by Ryde & Berg Orgelbyggeri AS in Fredrikstad.

== Zetlitz multi-purpose hall ==
The multi-purpose hall is named in honor of the poet and Lutheran pastor Jens Zetlitz, who was a Stavanger native. In terms of acoustics, this hall is primarily designed for amplified music. It can be used for a great many purposes from rock to opera, and may be rigged as an amphitheatre, an arena, a catwalk or just have a flat floor suitable for a banquet or for a standing audience. The hall can be arranged for up to 1,700 seats.
