= Kviteseid Church =

Church in Telemark, Norway

- Kviteseid kyrkje
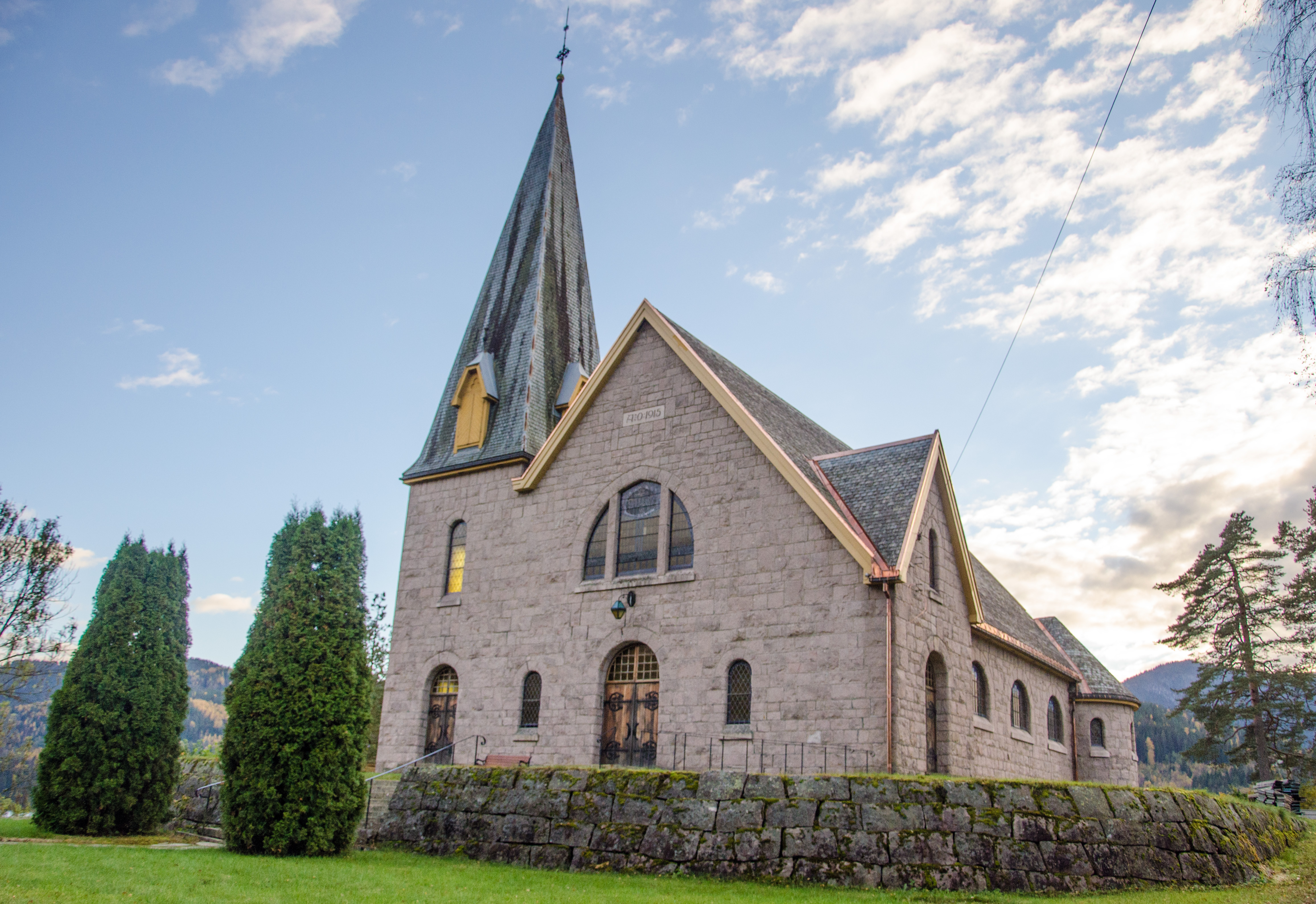
- View of the church
- Kviteseid Church
- 59°24′13″N 8°29′05″E
- Location: Kviteseid Municipality, Telemark
- Country: Norway
- Denomination: Church of Norway
- Churchmanship: Evangelical Lutheran

History
- Status: Parish church
- Founded: 1916
- Consecrated: 18 June 1916

Architecture
- Functional status: Active
- Architect: Haldor Larsen Børve
- Architectural type: Long church
- Completed: 1915 (111 years ago)

Specifications
- Capacity: 320
- Materials: Stone

Administration
- Diocese: Agder og Telemark bispedømme
- Deanery: Øvre Telemark prosti
- Parish: Kviteseid
- Norwegian Cultural Heritage Site
- Type: Church
- Status: Listed
- ID: 178079

Kviteseid Church (Norwegian: Kviteseid kyrkje) is a parish church of the Church of Norway in Kviteseid Municipality in Telemark county, Norway. It is located in the village of Kviteseid. It is the main church for the Kviteseid parish which is part of the Øvre Telemark prosti (deanery) in the Diocese of Agder og Telemark. The brown, stone church was built in a long church design in 1915 using plans drawn up by the architect Haldor Larsen Børve. The church seats about 320 people.

== History ==
The Old Kviteseid Church stands about 6 kilometres (3.7 mi) to the south of the present church, and the old church served the parish of Kviteseid for centuries. The old church was located in the central part of the parish. Over the years, the village of Kviteseid grew up around the northern end of the lake Sundkilen and the old church stood about 6 kilometres (3.7 mi) to the south of there, along the lake Kviteseidvatnet. In 1869, the parish priest moved from the old rectory by the church to a new rectory in the village. In the late 1800s, it was decided to move the Kviteseid Church to the village of Kviteseid and to compensate for moving it further to the northwest, the parish would also build a brand new church at Fjågesund to serve the eastern part of the parish. Because of the small size of the parish, it took many years to raise the money needed to construct both new churches.

Around 1900, drawings were available for a wooden long church that was designed by Carl Berner from the Norwegian Ministry of Church Affairs and Education but the local municipal council did not approve them because that church would have been too expensive for the parish to afford. New designs were then obtained from the architect Haldor Larsen Børve. A stonemason named Sundby and a builder named Opsund were responsible for the construction of the new Kviteseid Church. The new church is a long church that is faced with red granite (from a nearby quarry), but inside it is built with bricks that have been whitewashed and painted. The church was built in 1915-1916 and the new building was consecrated on 18 June 1916–the day before the new Fjågesund Church was consecrated. After this, the Old Kviteseid Church was closed down and it was left untouched for several decades before being carefully restored.

== Media gallery ==
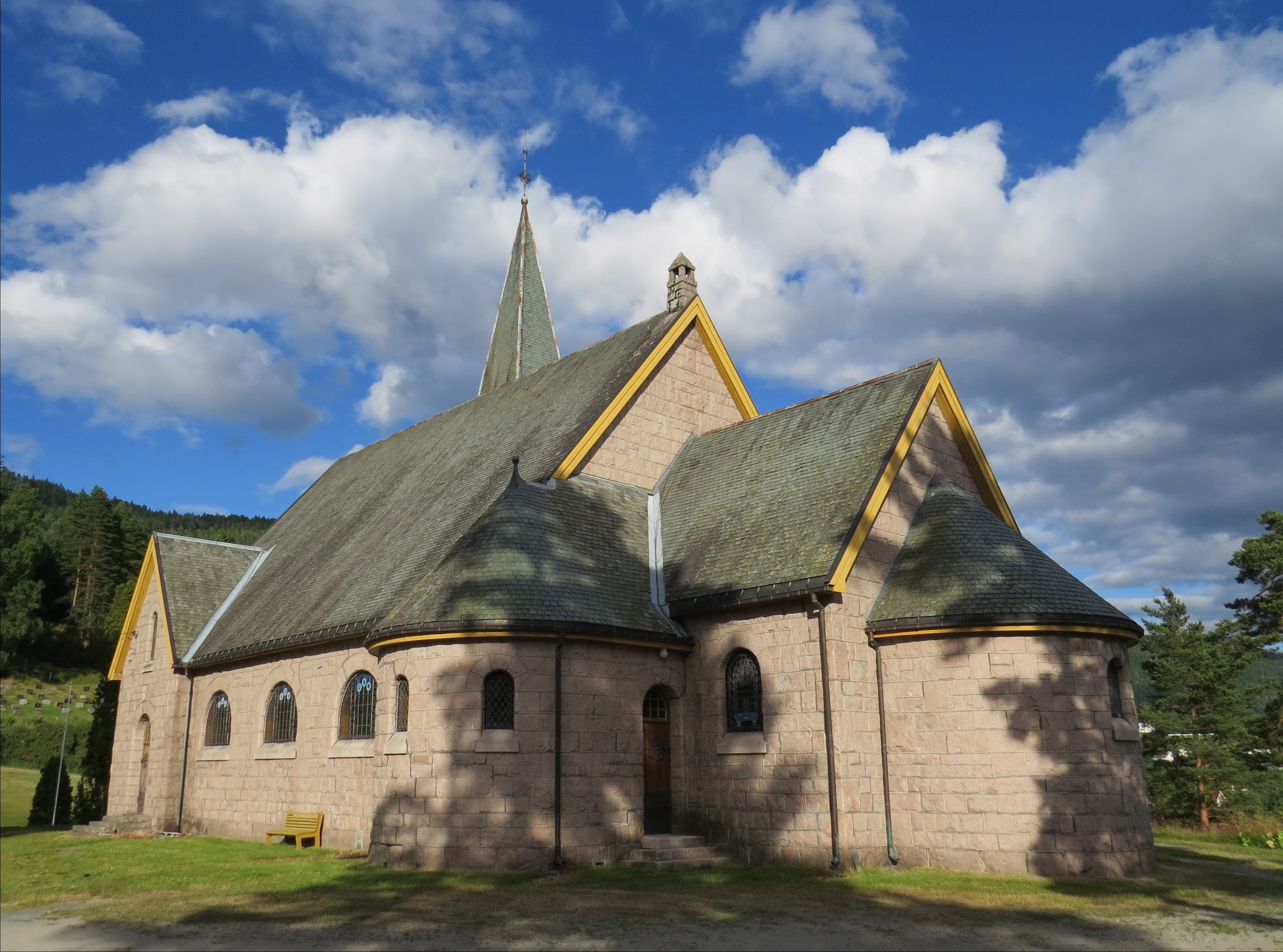

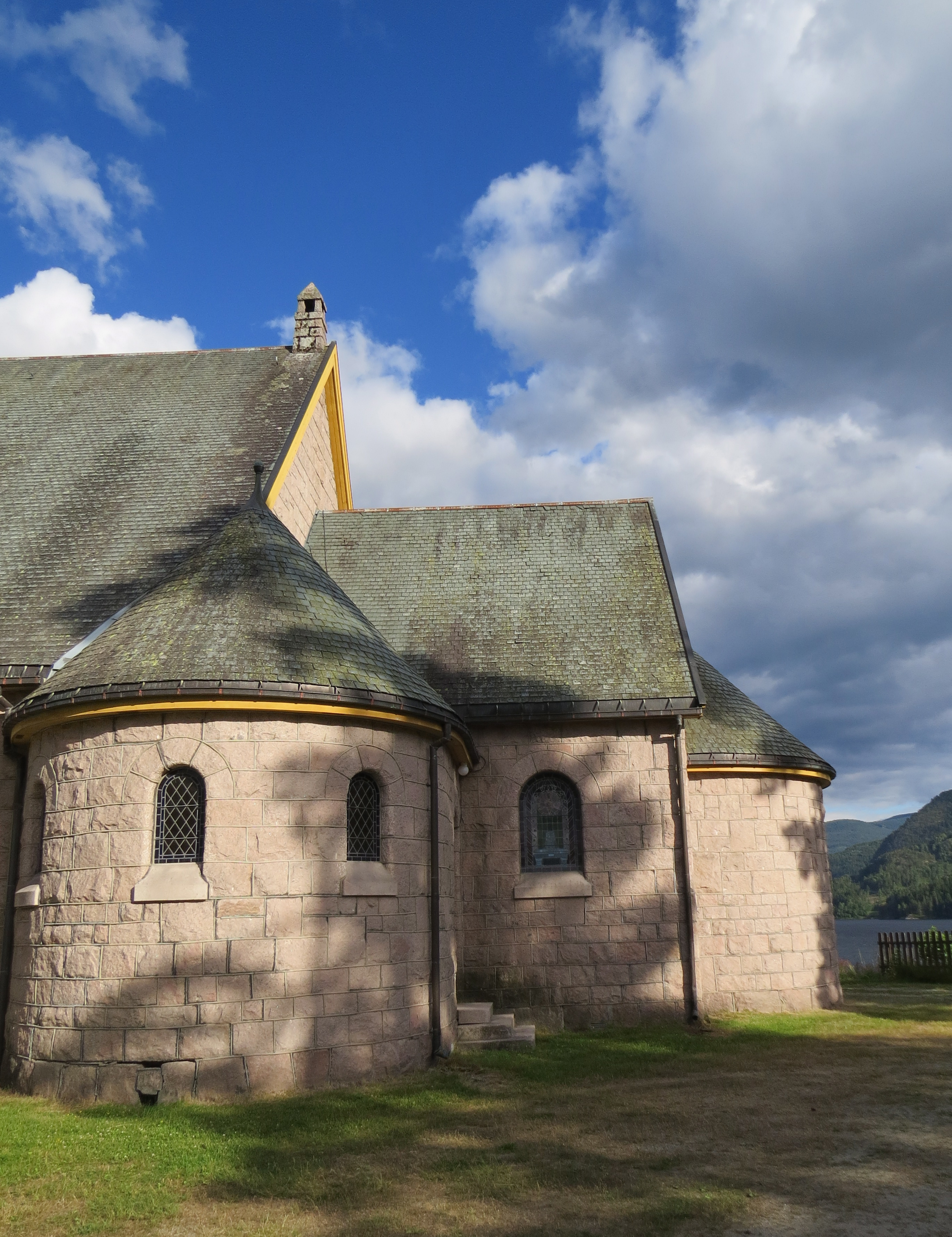

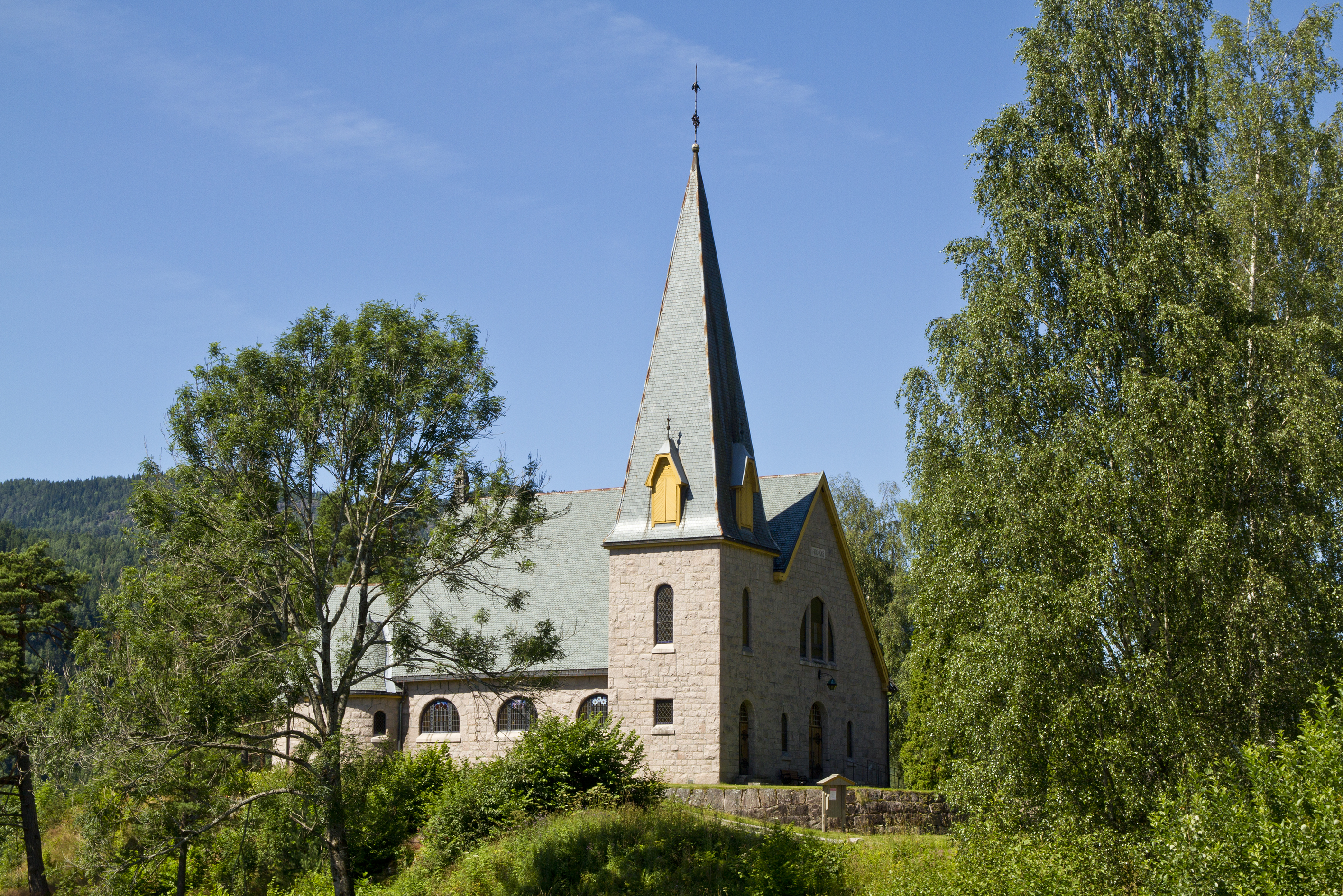

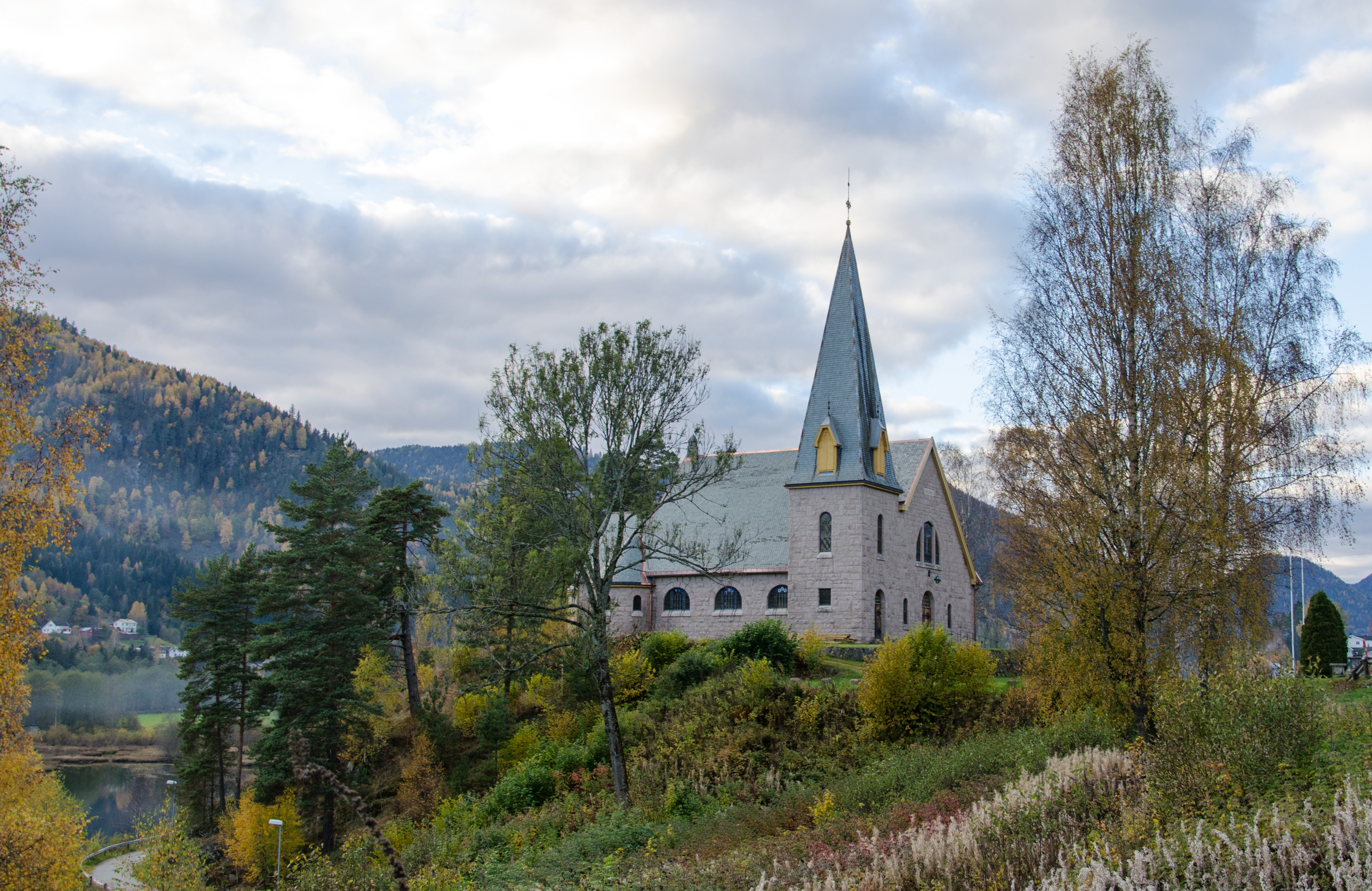

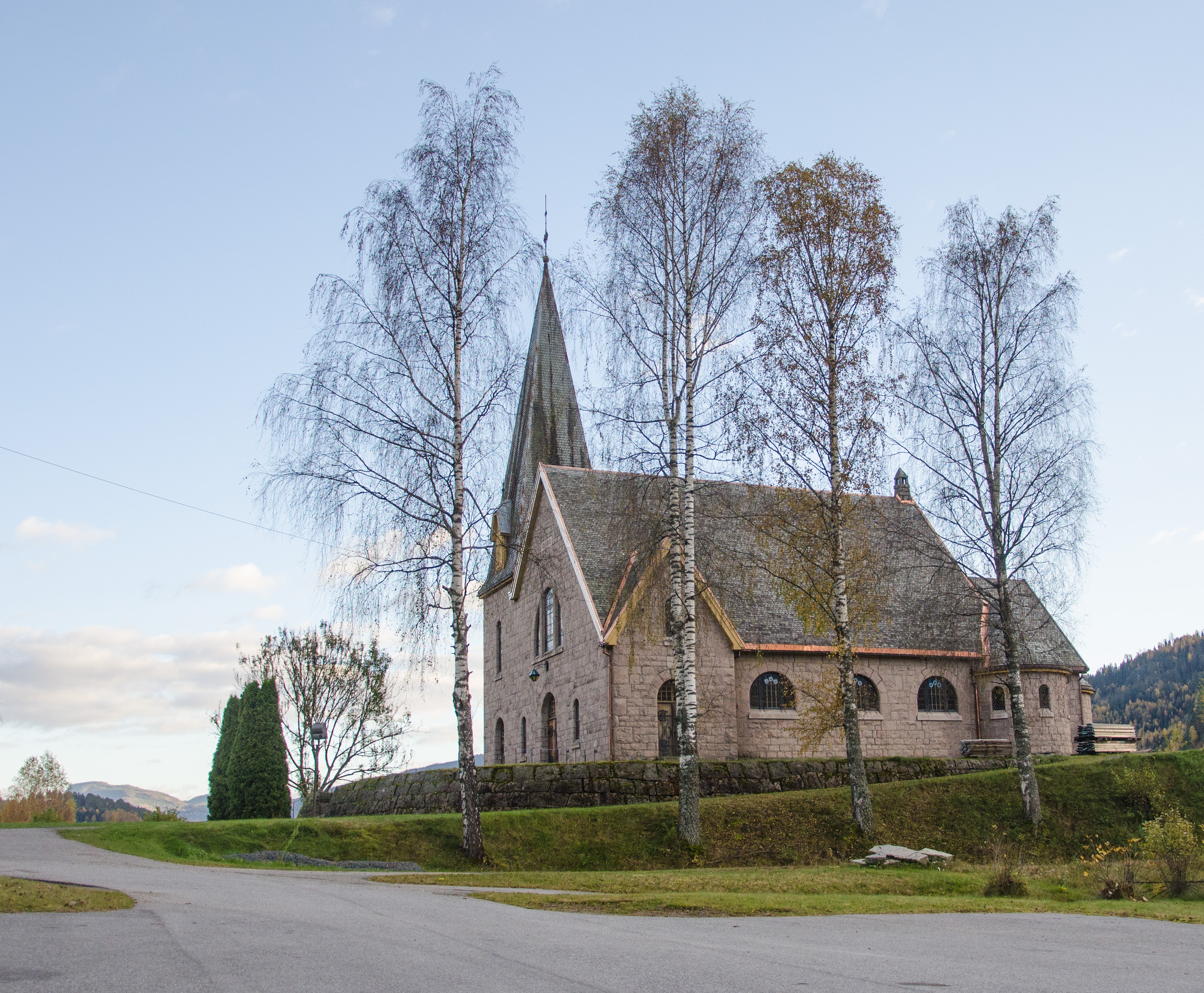

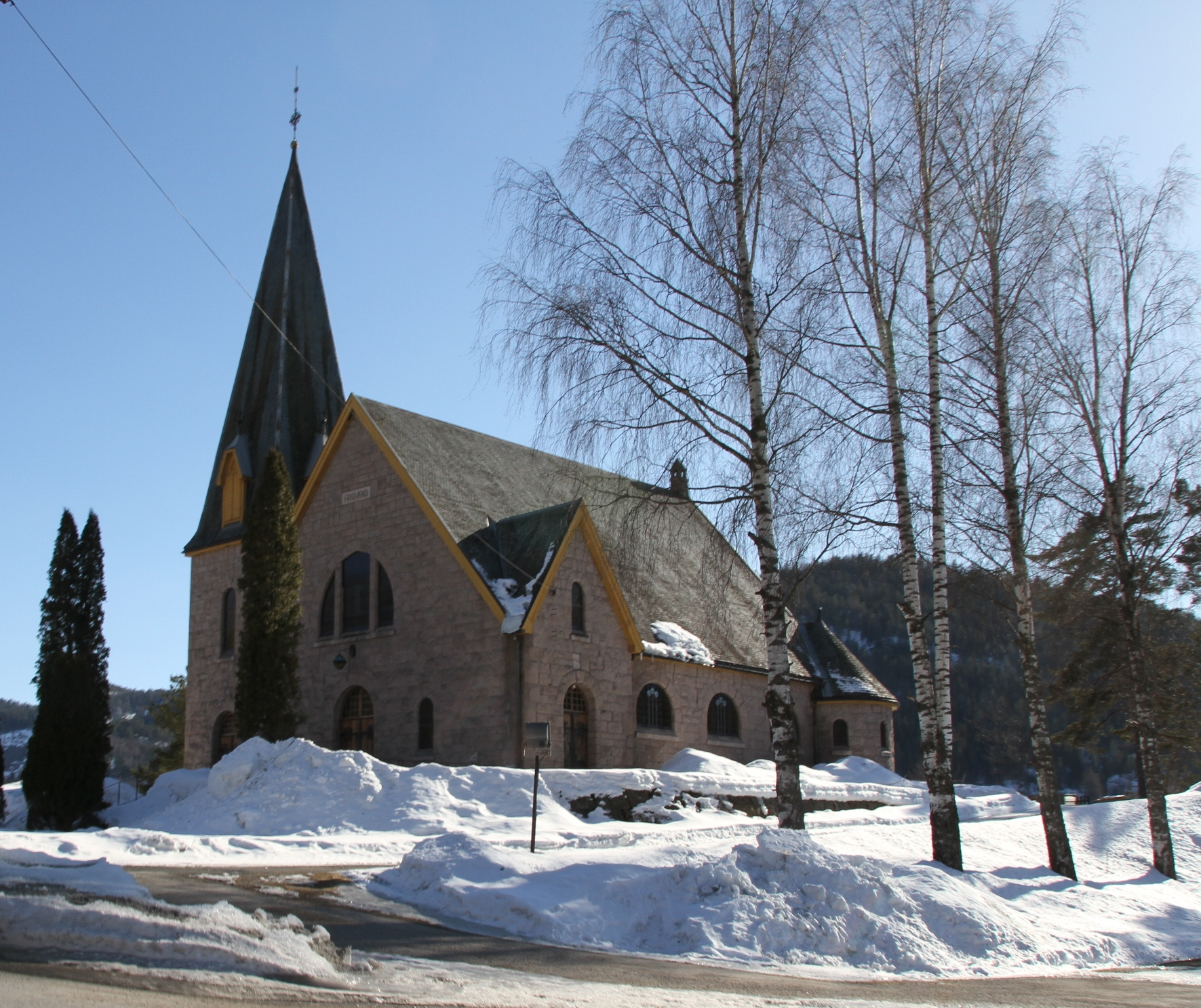

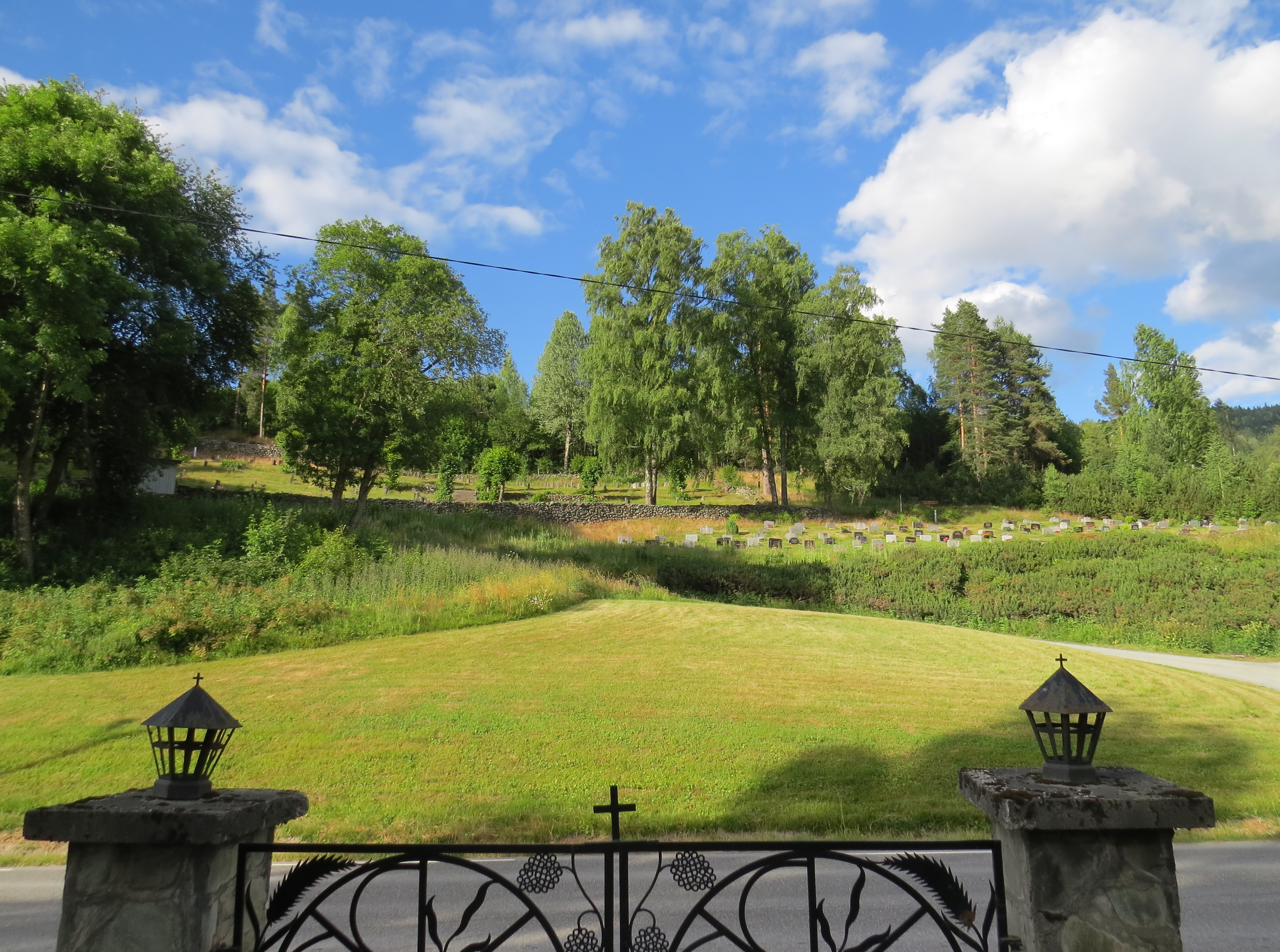

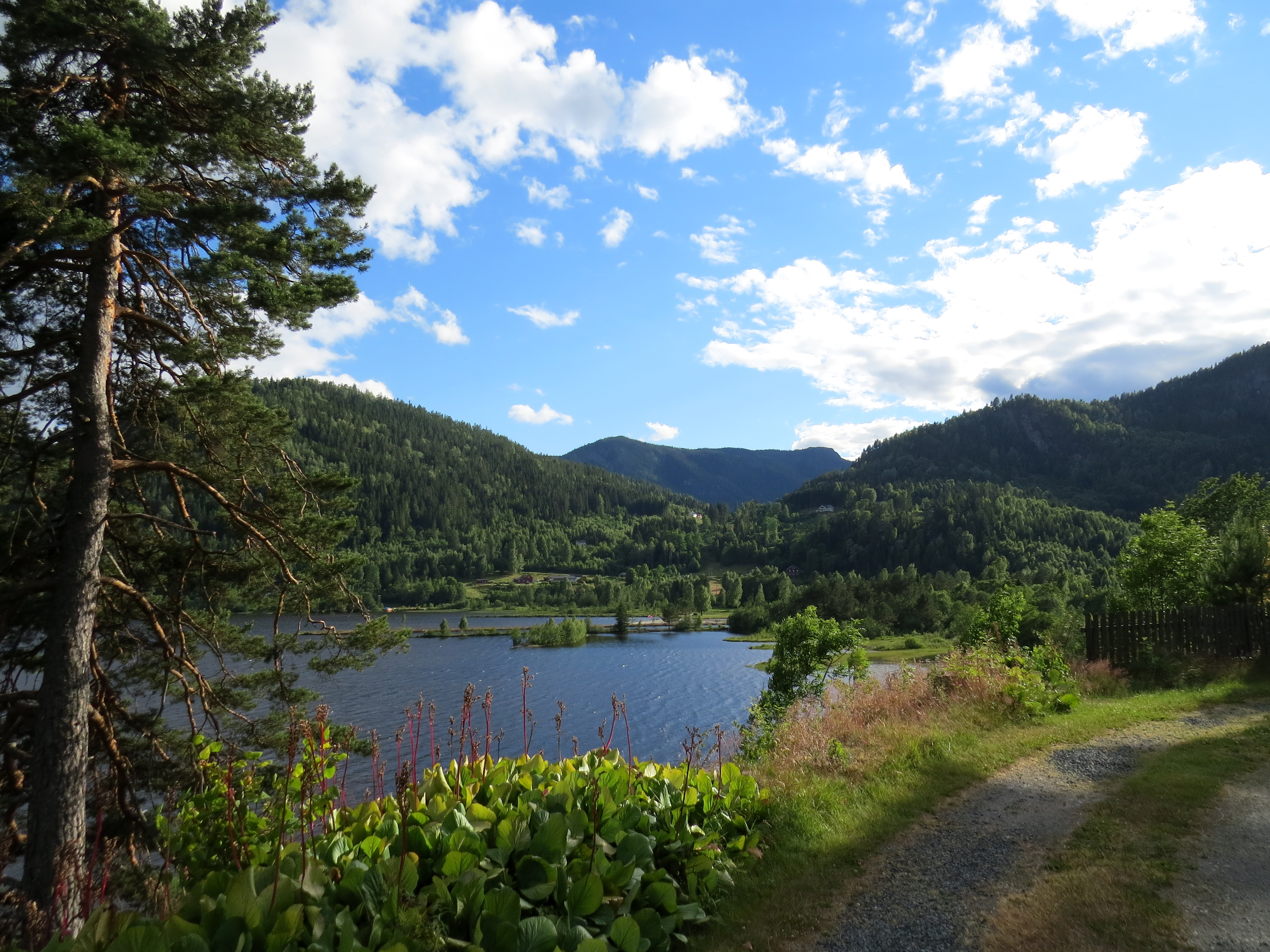

== See also ==
- List of churches in Agder og Telemark
