= Sverre Næss (actor) =

Norwegian stage actor (1881-1960)

Sverre Næss (18 August 1881 – 28 January 1960) was a Norwegian stage actor.

He was employed at Den Nationale Scene in 1916. His 25th anniversary was marked in 1942, in which Næss played Old Foldal in Ibsen's John Gabriel Borkman. During the German occupation of Norway he was also a political prisoner in Bergen from 25 May to 7 July 1941.

After the war, he was acting director of Den Nationale Scene until the autumn of 1946. In 1947 he left Den National Scene, having reached DNS' designated retirement age of 65, but found work at Rogaland Teater. His last and 299th role at Den Nationale Scene was as Arvik in Bjørnson's When the New Wine Blooms, which also became his first role at Rogaland Teater, playing against a young Aud Schønemann as Alvilde. Next, Næss and Schønemann played in Sartre's The Respectful Prostitute.

After the stint at Rogaland Teater, he made a surprise return to Den Nationale Scene and played several roles. A portrait painted by Olav Ansgar Larsen was commissioned by Den Nationale Scene.

Sverre Næss died in January 1960 in Bergen, being survived by a wife and two daughters.
