= Norwegian Society =

Literary society for Norwegian students in Copenhagen, 1772-1813

The Norwegian Society (Norske Selskab) was a literary society for Norwegian students in Copenhagen active from 1772 to 1813. Its members included authors, poets and philosophers. The Norwegian Society was formed in 1772 by Ove Gjerløw Meyer. Their meeting place was Madame Juel's Coffeehouse (madame Juels Kaffehus) in the Læderstræde.

It was a gentlemen's club, with the exception of the waitress Karen Bach and the poet Magdalene Sophie Buchholm, and the meetings were lively with speakers, song and discussion, poetry recitation improvisations and relatively significant intakes of punch. The club considered itself culturally conservative and devoted to the rationalistic empirical style of Ludvig Holberg.

The members of the Norwegian Society are often viewed as playing a central role in the wakening of Norwegian patriotic awareness at the close of the 18th century. Many of the poems and plays had patriotic themes. The society was discontinued in 1813 after the battle was won to establish the first Norwegian university, but a new gentlemen's club with the same name started in 1818.

== Central members ==
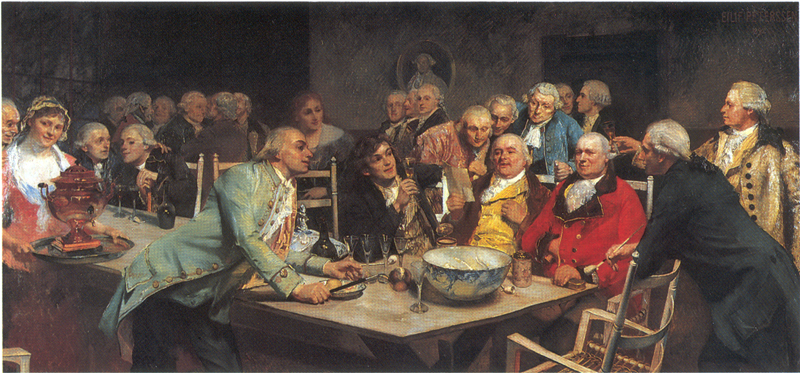
An Evening at the Norwegian Society (1892 painting): Johan Herman Wessel (center, glass raised); Johan Nordahl Brun (in red jacket); the hostess, Madam Juehl (behind Wessel).

- Johannes Ewald (1743–1781)
- Johan Nordahl Brun (1745–1816)
- Magdalene Sophie Buchholm (1758–1825), only female member
- Ove Gjerløw Meyer
- Niels Treschow (1751–1833)
- Jakob Edvard Colbjørnsen
- Claus Fasting
- P. H. Frimann
- Jonas Rein
- Edvard Storm
- Jens Zetlitz
- Johan Herman Wessel (1742–1785)
