= P. H. Frimann =

Norwegian-Danish poet

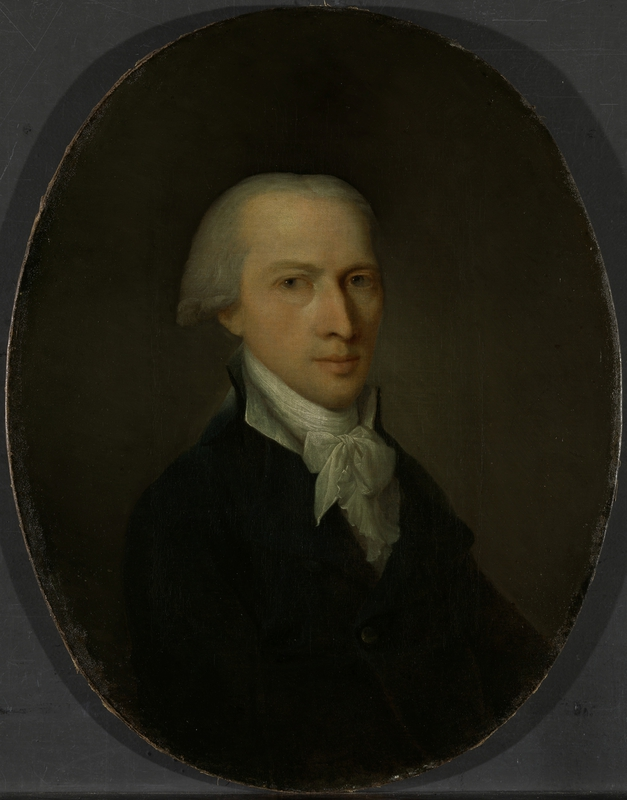
Portrait by Christian August Lorentzen, 1790s

Peter Harboe Frimann (18 November 1752, Selje – 21 September 1839) was a Norwegian-Danish poet and diplomat. In 1769 he was a student in Bergen. Later, while a student in Copenhagen, he became a member of the Norwegian Society ("Det Norske Selskab").
