= Johan Nordahl Brun =

19th-century Norwegian Lutheran bishop, poet, and politician

The Right Reverend Johan Nordahl Brun
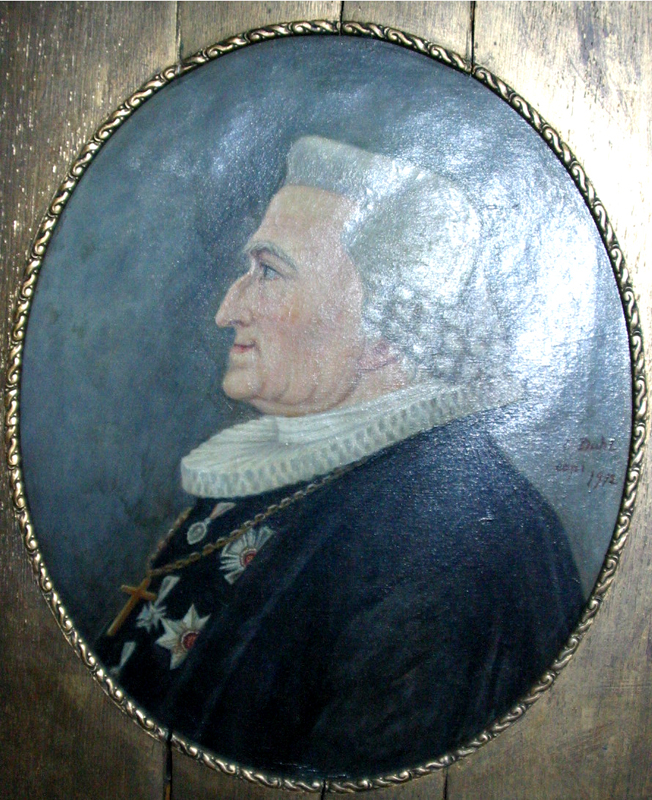
- Portrait hanging in the Bergen Cathedral

Personal details
- Born: 21 March 1745 Byneset, Norway
- Died: 26 July 1816 (aged 71) Bergen, Norway
- Denomination: Church of Norway
- Occupation: Priest

Johan Nordahl Brun (21 March 1745 – 26 July 1816) was a Norwegian-Danish poet, dramatist, bishop of the Diocese of Bjørgvin (1804–1816), and politician who contributed significantly to the growth of national romanticism in Norway, contributing to the growing national consciousness.

== Early life and family ==
Johan Nordahl Brun was born in Byneset, just outside the city of Trondheim in Søndre Trondhjem county, Norway, on 21 March 1745. He was born to the businessman Svend Busch Brun (1703–1784) and his wife Mette Catharina Nordal. He traveled to Copenhagen in 1767, where he passed his theological examinations. While at the University of Copenhagen, Brun was a prominent member of The Norwegian Society (Det Norske Selskab), a group of younger Norwegian authors, poets and philosophers. He was married on 2 September 1773 to Ingeborg Lind. Nordahl Grieg (Johan Nordahl Brun Grieg) was a descendant of the bishop and was named after him.

== Career ==
After leaving the university, Brun worked for a time as a secretary to Bishop Johan Ernst Gunnerus in Trondheim. He was hired as the chaplain for the parish of Byneset Church in 1772. In 1774, he was called to be the parish priest for the Holy Cross Church in Bergen. He served in this post from 1774 until 1793 when he was promoted to the position of Dean of Bergen and Nordhordland. In 1804, Brun was appointed bishop of the Diocese of Bjørgvin. He served as bishop until his death on 26 July 1816.

== Literary works ==
Brun is recognized in literary history for writing the first Norwegian romantic nationalistic play, Einer Tambeskielver (1772), which inspired a strong awakening of Norwegian national spirit and was produced many times. He also wrote many poems, including Norway's first (unofficial) national anthem, "For Norge, Kiempers Fødeland" (1771), and published a book of Lutheran Hymns (1786). He was also the writer of the city of Bergen's anthem "Jeg Tog Min Nystæmte" (1790).

Religious titles
Preceded by Ole Irgens	Bishop of Bjørgvin; 1803–1816	Succeeded by Claus Pavels
