= Skjønberg =

Skjønberg is a surname. Notable people with the surname include:

- Espen Skjønberg (1924–2022), Norwegian actor
- Eugen Skjønberg (1889–1971), Norwegian actor
- Henny Skjønberg (1886–1973), Norwegian actress and stage director
- Pål Skjønberg (1919–2014), Norwegian actor
- Tom Skjønberg (1948–2019), Norwegian sailor
