= Elisabeth Bang =

Norwegian actress

Elisabeth Bang (26 September 1922 – 28 September 2009) was a Norwegian actress.

She was born in Skedsmo in Akershus, Norway.

During World War II, she made her stage debut at Bærum Studiescene where she also met her future husband actor Pål Skjønberg (1919–2014). They married in 1946, and as such Bang became a daughter-in-law of actor Eugen Skjønberg (1889–1971) and stage director Henny Skjønberg (1886–1973) and sister-in-law of actor Espen Skjønberg.

She was employed at Det Nye Teater from 1945 to 1946, Det Norske Teatret from 1946 to 1948, the Nationaltheatret from 1948 to 1950 and again at Det Norske Teatret from 1952. She also appeared in films. Bang made his film debut in Englandsfarere (1946) directed by Toralf Sandø (1899–1970). She played a social worker in Det brenner i natt! (1955). She also starred in An-Magritt (1969) directed by Arne Skouen (1913–2003) and Himmel og helvete (1969).

She and her husband were the parents of actors Hennika Skjønberg, Siv Skjønberg and Jo Skjønberg. She died during 2009 at Bærum.

== Filmography ==
Year	Title	Role	Notes
1946	Så møtes vi imorgen	Venninne av Erik	
1946	Englandsfarere	Hilde, sykepleierske	
1952	Vi vil skilles		
1955	Det brenner i natt!	Margrethe, sosialsekretær	
1960	Veien tilbake	Fru Dahl, fiolinisten kone	
1961	The Passionate Demons	Jacob's Sister	
1969	An-Magritt	Karen	
1969	Himmel og helvete	Fru Brenden	
1970	Bjurra		
