= Hans Nielsen Hauge (film) =

- Directed by: Kåre Bergstrøm
- Written by: Colbjørn Helander
- Starring: Per Sunderland; Preben Lerdorff Rye; Gunnar Lauring
- Cinematography: Sverre Bergli
- Edited by: Bjørn Breigutu
- Music by: Jolly Kramer-Johansen
- Distributed by: Fotorama; Kommunenes Filmcentral
- Release date: October 4, 1961
- Running time: 94 minutes
- Country: Norway
- Language: Norwegian

Hans Nielsen Hauge is a Norwegian film from 1961 directed by Kåre Bergstrøm. It is a dramatization of the life of the lay minister Hans Nielsen Hauge (1771–1824). The film received a lukewarm reception from Verdens Gang's reviewer, who gave it three out of six stars.

== Plot ==
The film opens in 1804, when Crown Prince Regent Frederick is ruling Denmark–Norway. The Royal Danish Chancellery has issued an arrest warrant for Hans Nielsen Hauge. The arrest warrant is sent to all the county governors in Norway, and Hauge is taken to Christiania in irons. The film follows the trial against Hauge. An impression of his past life and work is given in retrospect. The case against Hauge lasted many years because Copenhagen found no reason to hurry. This was a turning point in Norway, and Napoleon was building an empire in Europe. The case was not concluded until 1813.

== Cast ==
- Preben Lerdorff Rye as King Frederick VI
- Per Sunderland as Hans Nielsen Hauge
- Harald Aimarsen as a farmer
- Oscar Amundsen as Radich, the judge in Moss and Tune
- Eilif Armand as Lange, a bookbinder in Bergen
- Haakon Arnold as a police officer
- Beate Berntsen as the waitress at the club
- John Birkehoel as a prison guard
- Wilfred Breistrand as a lieutenant in Fredrikstad
- Erik Melbye Brekke as a coachman
- Hans Coucheron-Aamot as Aars, the judge
- Oscar Egede-Nissen as a man arrested for drunkenness
- John Eide as a singer outside the prison
- Helge Essmar as the prison director in Christiania
- Lauritz Falk as Blom, a court justice
- Tore Foss as Wulfsberg, a policeman
- Arvid Furulund as a man serving soup
- Jens Gunderssen as Peter Collett, the assessor
- Ulf Gustavsen as Mikkel Nielsen Hauge as a boy
- Egil Hagen as the man with news at the club
- Sverre Hansen as a merchant in Bergen
- Olafr Havrevold as Seeberg, the parish priest in Tune
- Egil Hjorth-Jenssen as a printer in Christiania
- Thor Hjorth-Jenssen as Gram, the sheriff in Eiker
- Randi Holst-Jensen as the woman at the front of the food line
- Ola Isene as Lausen Bull, the mayor
- Ellen Iversen as a woman
- Ola B. Johannessen as a man arrested for drunkenness
- Lasse Kolstad as Ole Nielsen, the sheriff
- Jolly Kramer-Johansen as a guard
- Einar Nic. Kristensen as the boys' father
- Lars Kristensen as Hans Nielsen Hauge as a boy
- Bernt Erik Larssen as Doctor Müller
- Erik Lassen as the man in the wagon
- Gunnar Lauring as Kaas
- Per Lillo-Stenberg as the judge Hans Hagerup Falbe
- Erling Lindahl as Hoffgaard, the bailiff in Smålenene
- Lothar Lindtner as a merchant in Bergen
- Georg Løkkeberg as Bishop Schønheyder
- Egil Lorck as a man arrested for drunkenness
- Leidulv Lothe as a singer outside the prison
- Fridtjof Mjøen as Pavel, the castle priest in Christiania
- Harald Myhrbråten as a prison guard
- Rolf Nannestad as a prisoner
- Ole-Jørgen Nilsen as a sergeant in Fredrikstad
- Nils Nittel as a man
- Teddy Nordgren as a policeman in Bergen
- Rolf Nordland as a clerk and secretary
- Ragnar Olason as a prison guard
- Carl Børseth Rasmussen as Bishop Nordahl Brun
- Helge Reiss as the prosecutor
- Ingolf Rogde as Kreydal, the judge in Lillesan
- Rolf Sand as a peddler
- Aud Schønemann as a woman
- Ragnar Schreiner as a prisoner
- Espen Skjønberg as Mikkel Nielsen Hauge
- Ada Skolmen as a woman
- Rolf Søder as a farmer
- Alfred Solaas as Urdahl, the parish priest in Tune
- Astrid Sommer as the farmer's wife
- Harald Heide Steen as a man in Bjørnstad
- Henrik Anker Steen as Feiermann, the parish priest in Fredrikstad
- Siv Stokland as Ragnhild, the farmer's daughter
- Svend Svendsen as a tenant farmer
- Roy Thorsrud as a sheriff's deputy
- Stevelin Urdahl as a neighbor
- Kåre Wicklund as the man at the front of the food line
- Carsten Winger as Ludvig Ingstad, a councilor
