= Stevnemøte med glemte år =

1957 film

- Directed by: Jon Lennart Mjøen
- Written by: Jon Lennart Mjøen; Bjørn Bergh-Pedersen; Olav Dalgard; Sigurd Hoel
- Produced by: Bjørn Bergh-Pedersen
- Starring: Mona Hofland
- Cinematography: Gunnar F. Syvertsen
- Release date: 22 April 1957
- Running time: 89 minutes
- Country: Norway
- Language: Norwegian

Stevnemøte med glemte år (Rendezvous with Forgotten Years) is a 1957 Norwegian drama film directed by Jon Lennart Mjøen. It was entered into the 7th Berlin International Film Festival.

== Cast ==
- Mona Hofland
- Espen Skjønberg
- Henki Kolstad
- Inger Marie Andersen
- Jon Lennart Mjøen
- Rolf Christensen
- Pål Skjønberg
- Bab Christensen
- Eva Steen
