= Storberget =

Storberget is a surname. Notable people with the surname include:

- Bjørn Storberget, Norwegian writer
- Knut Storberget, Norwegian lawyer and politician
