= The Last Lieutenant =

- US DVD cover
- Directed by: Hans Petter Moland
- Written by: Axel Hellstenius; Hans Petter Moland
- Produced by: Esben Høilund Carlsen and Harald Ohrvik
- Starring: Espen Skjønberg; Lars Andreas Larssen; Gard B. Eidsvold; Bjørn Sundquist
- Cinematography: Harald Gunnar Paalgard
- Edited by: Einar Egeland
- Music by: Randall Meyers
- Release date: 27 August 1993
- Running time: 102 minutes
- Country: Norway
- Language: Norwegian

The Last Lieutenant (Norwegian: Secondløitnanten) is a 1993 Norwegian film, directed by Hans Petter Moland and starring Espen Skjønberg. It was released in the USA with English subtitles.

== Plot ==
The old sea-captain retires, but the next day, German World War II invasion of Norway begins. He then kisses his wife goodbye and is off to Regiment HQ. There, he finds a lack of leadership and morale that offends him. They laugh at him and his outdated uniform and discontinue the second lieutenant officer rank that he had earned years before. He is then sent with a few men to blow up a bridge. The young men laugh at him and ignore the old sea-captain's advice on how to destroy the bridge effectively. When it fails to collapse, he completes the job himself. He then returns to HQ to find that its officers have voted to surrender. He leaves the HQ with a few men; taking trucks and supplies to continue the fight. He later goes on to rebuild a small fighting unit with volunteers and draftees and achieves some battlefield success. Eventually, his men abandon him and he faces a German attack alone.

== Historical context ==
The film is set during the early part of World War 2, and specifically around Operation Weserübung, the invasion of Norway and Denmark by Germany, beginning on 9 April 1940.

This film is based, somewhat loosely, on the actions of 2nd Lt. Thor O. Hannevig, Norwegian Army (Reserve). He was a retired sea Captain who rejoined the Norwegian Army and fought with a force of 150 mostly reserve soldiers as the Telemark Infantry Regiment after his original regiment surrendered on 9 April 1940. The ad hoc regiment operated from 21 April 1940, around the town of Vinje in Telemark County, until 3 May when the regiment became aware that the 4th Division had also capitulated, dashing any hope of relief forces. Most of his men were discharged from service at this time and left the area in civilian clothing. On 8 May, Hannevig and the remaining three soldiers and six female auxiliaries of the regiment were taken as prisoners of war and the 28 German POWs Hannevig's force had captured were freed.

Key differences between the actual events and those depicted in the film are the age of Lt. Hannevig, that he disbanded his unit instead of being abandoned by his soldiers, and a small staff remained with him until he surrendered to the Germans. In addition, the German POWs his regiment had captured were still held, and were handed over to the German forces directly.
