= Portrettet =

- Directed by: Per Aabel; Borgwall Skaugen
- Written by: Per Aabel; Borgwall Skaugen
- Based on: A concept by Odd Grythe and Randi Kolstad
- Produced by: Per Skavlan
- Starring: Per Aabel; Wenche Foss; Nanna Stenersen; Ingolf Rogde
- Cinematography: Mattis Mathiesen; Frank Christiansen
- Edited by: Borgwall Skaugen; Lennart Arvidsson
- Music by: Egil Monn-Iversen
- Distributed by: Tania Film A/S
- Release date: December 26, 1954
- Running time: 91 minutes
- Country: Norway
- Language: Norwegian

Portrettet (The Portrait) is a Norwegian comedy film from 1954. It was directed by Per Aabel and Borgwall Skaugen. They also wrote the script for the film, which was based on a concept by Odd Grythe and Randi Kolstad. Aabel played the lead role in the film.

== Plot ==
The film takes place in the idyllic town of Solsund, where Per Haug lives. He is a pharmacist, bachelor, amateur painter, and leader of the political opposition in the city council. One day he rushes home from a stormy city council meeting and angrily paints a portrait of Mayor Abrahamsen. Haug's anger is not only due to different political views, but also to the fact that Abrahamsen is trying to seduce Haug's housekeeper.

One day, Haug is visited by a childhood friend from Oslo. When the friend travels home, he takes the portrait of their old school teacher painted by Haug. Haug learns that painting has become the sensation of the year at the Autumn Exhibition in Oslo.

== Cast ==
- Per Aabel as Per Haug, a pharmacist
- Wenche Foss as Sosse Laurantzon, a shipowner's wife
- Nanna Stenersen as Miss Thorsen, Haug's housekeeper
- Ingolf Rogde as Abrahamsen, a butcher and mayor
- Espen Skjønberg as Nilsen, a pharmacist
- Sigurd Magnussøn as Langerud, a teacher
- Folkman Schaanning as Johansen, an editor
- Harald Heide Steen as Ola
- Ulf Selmer as Hammer, a pharmacist
- Unni Torkildsen as Mrs. Hammer
- Kirsten Sørlie as Elise Hammer
- Stevelin Urdahl as Anders
- Einar Vaage as Bjerkås, a lawyer
- Rolf Christensen as Wilhelm Borch, a painter
- Aud Schønemann as Mirakel
- Eugen Skjønberg as Vakt
- Paal Roschberg as Pal
- Per Asplin as a singer in the Solsund Singers
- Nora Brockstedt as a singer in the Solsund Singers
- Fredrik Conradi as a singer in the Solsund Singers
- Oddvar Sanne as a singer in the Solsund Singers
- Sølvi Wang as a singer in the Solsund Singers
- Marit Halset
- Jan Pande-Rolfsen
- Erna Schøyen
- Vesla Stenersen
