= Selkvinnen =

- Directed by: Lauritz Falk; Per Jonson
- Written by: Leif Sinding
- Starring: Lauritz Falk; Liv Hagerup; Hjalmar Fries; Aagot Børseth; Marie Hamilton; Gunnar Skar; Jack Fjeldstad; Ottar Wicklund; Adolf Bjerke; Eugen Skjønberg; Henny Skjønberg; Lydia Opøien; Jan Voigt
- Cinematography: Kåre Bergstrøm
- Edited by: Pierre Bardh; Per Gunnar Jonson
- Music by: Gunnar Sønstevold
- Distributed by: Janus-Film AS
- Release date: November 16, 1953
- Running time: 77 minutes
- Country: Norway
- Language: Norwegian

Selkvinnen (The Seal Woman) is a Norwegian film from 1953. It was directed by Lauritz Falk and Per Jonson; Falk himself played the lead role in the film. The film script was written by Leif Sinding. Gunnar Sønstevold composed the music for the film.

== Plot ==
Danish bailiffs rule the Faroe Islands with a firm hand. In Tórshavn resides the bailiff Hammershaimb, who is hard and unapproachable in his civil service, but is caring and loving as a family man. He tries to relieve his daughter Inger's boredom by letting her travel to his new country house, Skardir, while he ponders his administrative problems. First and foremost, it is the royal trade monopoly and its harsh methods that is a source of dissatisfaction, and public opinion against the monopoly is growing stronger. The Faroese are aware that this institution is impoverishing them, and the leader of the public opinion campaign against it is Paul Nolsøe, with the rich farmer Hannes Klasor by his side. The first time Paul and the bailiff's daughter Inger meet is when Paul, who is a renowned at catching northern gannets at risk to his own life, tries to show Inger how this dangerous task in the mountains takes place. Inger feels strongly attracted to the stout Faroese farmer, and gradually a friendship develops between them. Paul shows her the land, and he takes her home to his farm, where his cousin Ragni manages the house. Inger discovers that Ragni is in love with her cousin, something Paul does not understand. After an unsuccessful meeting between Paul and the bailiff, the bailiff is made aware by his servant of the friendship between Inger and Paul. Nonetheless, they continue to meet. Paul tells Inger that he has plans to travel to Copenhagen and tell the king about the irregularities of the monopoly. However, Inger is skeptical about this. Hannes is upset after a failed courtship, and he urges the farmers to fight, but Paul urges level-headedness. This leads to a fight between the two men, when a humpback whale is suddenly spotted in the sea. Then the hunt is underway, and afterward there is a party.

It has been arranged that Inger will leave the Faroe Islands, but she refuses. However, when she finds out that her father is corrupt, she agrees to travel. When Paul is to take the boat to Copenhagen, he and his two fellow travelers are overpowered and locked inside the hold. Paul sees Inger from the hold, and he thinks she has betrayed him. He tells his comrades the legend of the seal woman. In Copenhagen, Inger engages in fun and parties, but she is reminded of Paul, who is now accused of rebellion against the king. Inger then seeks out the judge and arranges for an investigator to be sent to the Faroe Islands. She then seeks out Paul in prison and tells him to take courage. She says that there is someone at home waiting for him—namely, Ragni. Paul is then acquitted, and the king receives him in audience. Paul imagines the Faroe Islands, with its bustling bird life, the whale hunt, and Ragni's happy face.

== About the film ==
Today Selkvinnen is considered a legendary Norwegian film turkey. It received very bad reviews after the premiere, which led to it being reedited and attempts to re-release it.

Arbeiderbladet wrote on November 17, 1953: "Aamot has been kind enough to show this film in the center. But neither [its screening at] the Saga Cinema, the bailiff's daughter's swim in 17th-century underwear, or a blonde and naked seal woman rising from the sea will be able to save this Norwegian film in port. In addition, it is too clumsy and involuntarily comical in its unartistic attempt to merge a series of documentary footage from bird hunting, whaling, and weather conditions in the Faroe Islands with a historical depiction of Nólsoyar Páll (Lauritz Falk) and some other handsome Faroese rebels against the Danish trade monopoly yoke. ... For an occupational psychologist it may be of interest that this film—which Leif Sinding's spirit hovers over, although his name is not mentioned in any of the credits—is about a small people's struggle against foreign oppressors."

Dagbladet wrote on November 17, 1953: "it does not help to just have sagging trousers, top hats, and seagull cries. It's bitter to have to say it, but with Selvinnen Norwegian film goes all the way to the bottom, as it has not done since the war. ... You would almost need state support to see this movie! ... Holst Jensen and Jack Fjeldstad remind one in minor roles that, after all, films have been made in Norway before."

The film is considered the one that put an end to a public film-funding arrangement whereby films were privately funded, presented to a committee, quality-approved, and then had the funding covered by the public sector. This was the first film that did not receive such approval, and the uproar led to the arrangement being changed.

== Cast ==
- Lauritz Falk as Paul Nolsøe
- Liv Hagerup as Ragni, Paul's cousin
- Hjalmar Fries as the bailiff Wenzel Hammershaimb
- Ågot Børseth as Elise, the bailiff's wife
- Marie Hamilton as Ragni, the bailiff's daughter
- Gunnar Skar as Niclas, the bailiff's servant
- Jack Fjeldstad as Hannes Klasor
- Ronnie Boatler as the seal woman
