= Den evige Eva =

1953 film by Rolf Randall

- Directed by: Rolf Randall
- Written by: Sigbjørn Obstfelder (novel); Rolf Randall
- Starring: Hjalmar Fries; Mona Hofland; Astri Jacobsen; Fridtjof Mjøen
- Release date: 1953
- Running time: 99 minutes
- Country: Norway
- Language: Norwegian

Den evige Eva (English: The Eternal Eve) is a 1953 Norwegian drama film directed by Rolf Randall, photographed by Reidar Lund, production designed by Knut Yran. The film is based on a novel by Sigbjørn Obstfelder, and starring Hjalmar Fries, Mona Hofland, Astri Jacobsen and Fridtjof Mjøen.

Rebekka (Jacobsen) is in a loveless marriage, and leaves her husband for the author Sigurd Winge (Mjøen). Also this relationship runs into problems, however, because of Winge's uncontrollable jealousy.

== Plot ==
A young woman, Rebekka Berge (Jacobsen), gets married "well" without having found the right one. After her marriage to real estate agent Berge, she has a child. Her desire for order and fulfillment becomes so strong that she leaves her husband and child. In the meantime, Rebekka meets and falls deeply in love with the sculptor Bredo Barre. She then meets the writer Sigurd Winge (Mjøen) at a party and is drawn to him by a force stronger than her will. Together, Rebekka and Sigurd live out the fairy tale that genuine happiness has to offer, but he ends up ruining it with his suspicions and jealousy. By the end, Rebekka no longer believes that the world she has sought exists. She weaves a cross from a cut-off lock of hair, and with this last greeting and a letter, she leaves Winge.

== Cast List ==
- Astri Jacobsen - Rebekka Berge
- Fridtjof Mjøen - Sigurd Winge, author
- Carl Lauritz Børseth Rasmussen - Bredo Barre, sculptor
- Gunnar Simenstad - Einar Berge, real estate agent
- Britta Lech-Hanssen - The Maid
- Mona Hofland - Berge's first friend
- Edel Stenberg - Berge's other friend
- Sven von Düring - A pool player
- Harald Schwenzen - The host of the party
- Hjalmar Fries - Rebekah's father
- Jan Voigt - Rebekka's dance partner
