= Thor O. Hannevig =

- Born: Thor Olaf Hannevig; 20 April 1891; Åsgårdstrand, Norway
- Died: 17 February 1975 (aged 83)
- Monuments: In Vinje (1991)
- Occupation: Shipmaster
- Known for: Battle of Vinjesvingen

Thor Olaf Hannevig (20 April 1891 – 17 February 1975) was a Norwegian shipmaster. During the Norwegian Campaign in 1940 he was in command of an army unit called the Telemark Infantry Regiment, and this regiment was able to withstand the German forces until 5 May. Hannevig later acquired a legendary heroic status, and his story was the basis of the 1993 Norwegian film The Last Lieutenant.

Hannevig was born in Åsgårdstrand. He had taken an 8-months' officer's course in 1915. In addition to being a shipmaster, during his life he also owned a distillery, was an adventurer and a Freemason, and worked in a hotel, as a banker, a merchant, and a farmer. He died in Skreia in 1975. A monument was erected in Vinje Municipality to mark the centenary of his birth in 1991.
