= Savnet siden mandag =

- Directed by: Sigval Maartmann-Moe; Tancred Ibsen
- Written by: Sigval Maartmann-Moe; Axel Kielland; Tancred Ibsen
- Based on: Gunnar Larsen's novel To mistenkelige personer
- Produced by: Sigval Maartmann-Moe; Bjarne Stokland
- Starring: Peter Lindgren; Ivar Svendsen; Sonja Heiberg; Einar Vaage; Kirsten Sørlie; Britta Lech-Hanssen
- Cinematography: Kåre Bergstrøm; Per Gunnar Jonson
- Music by: Pauline Hall
- Distributed by: Norsk Film
- Release date: June 27, 1955
- Running time: 75 minutes
- Country: Norway
- Language: Norwegian

Savnet siden mandag (Missing since Monday) is a Norwegian feature film from 1955 directed by Sigval Maartmann-Moe and Tancred Ibsen. The screenplay was written by Maartmann-Moe, Ibsen, and Axel Kielland. Peter Lindgren and Ivar Svendsen star as the Swede and the missing 17-year-old.

Parts of the footage are from the 1950 film To mistenkelige personer, which was banned by the Norwegian Supreme Court in 1952. The ban was upheld until 2005.

== Plot ==
Seventeen-year-old Gunnar Holm has been missing since Monday, and no one has seen or heard anything from him in the past five days. His mother, Astrid Holm, lives alone with her son. While staying with a friend in the country, she had left Gunnar on his own. Mrs. Holm, Police Superintendent Haugen, and the child welfare representative Marit Lien travel around in a car in vain to try to find Gunnar or traces of him. Gunnar has teamed up with the Swedish outlaw and burglar Åke Göransson. During a theft, where Gunnar acts as a lookout, the Swede shoots and kills a shopkeeper while Gunnar fires two shots into the air. At the crime scene, the police find the bullets that Gunnar shot. They can be identified with a fired cartridge that Haugen found in Gunnar's home. The bullets come from the same weapon, and so everything indicates that the boy was there. However, the deadly shots were not fired with Gunnar's weapon, and the police therefore believe he is innocent. Gunnar and the Swede flee through the forest. Göransson makes Gunnar believe that he was the one that killed the shopkeeper. He says that they must stick together because, even if Gunnar is the culprit, they will receive the same punishment. After a burglary at a sheriff's house, they seek refuge with Anna in a small place next to the large forest. Anna has had a baby by the Swede, after he raped her.

The police have identified the fingerprints from the country store and state that they belong to Åke Göransson. The Swede puts strong pressure on Gunnar because he understands that the police are on their trail. He forces the young boy to swear that they must never take him alive: he is saving the last shot in the gun to take his own life. Astrid blames herself for the poor relations between her and her son, but thought she did everything for the best. Her friend has come to town and suggests that she and her son can move to his home in the country. Gunnar discovers in a newspaper that the police know their identity. According to Göransson's plan, they will lie low in the same place in the forest until the police give up the search. The search continues. The search crews have spotted them in their binoculars. The place is surrounded. They suddenly come upon Gunnar, who surrenders voluntarily. Göransson manages to escape. For a long time, he manages to keep the police off his track or sneak away when the search crews get too close. One day it's over: the Swede is sitting in a trap, well covered in a mountain gorge. He tries to shoot his way out, but he is unable to get away. The Swede will not surrender alive and points the gun at his temple. He shoots himself. Marit Lien thinks it will go better if the child welfare service puts Gunnar in her care. Superintendent Haugen believes that it will not be easy for him at first, but the child welfare representative thinks they can do it.

== Cast ==
- Peter Lindgren as Åke Göransson
- Ivar Svendsen as Gunnar Holm
- Bjarne Bø as the sheriff
- Kari Diesen as Oline, a neighbor woman
- Jack Fjeldstad as Astrid's friend
- Turid Haaland
- Eric Heed as an investigator
- Sonja Heiberg as Astrid Holm, Gunnar's mother
- Liv Hildeng
- Øivind Johnssen as a detective
- Willy Kramer-Johansen
- Erik Lassen as the robbery victim
- Britta Lech-Hanssen as Anna
- Eugen Skjønberg
- Kirsten Sørlie as Marit Lien, the child welfare representative
- Einar Vaage as Haugen, the police lieutenant
