= Gråt elskede mann =

Gråt, elskede mann
- Directed by: Nils R. Müller
- Written by: Nils R. Müller
- Based on: Bjørg Vik's novel Gråt elskede mann
- Produced by: Øyvind Vennerød
- Starring: Sverre Holm; Gertie Jung; Birgitta Molin; Berit Kullander; Espen Skjønberg; Helge Reiss; Pål Skjønberg; Randi Borch
- Cinematography: Sverre Bergli
- Edited by: Nils R. Müller
- Music by: Egil Monn-Iversen
- Distributed by: Europafilm AS
- Release date: December 26, 1971
- Running time: 99 minutes
- Country: Norway
- Language: Norwegian

Gråt elskede mann (Cry, Beloved Man) is a Norwegian drama film from 1971 directed by Nils R. Müller. The film was produced by Øyvind Vennerød, and Egil Monn-Iversen composed the music for the film. Sverre Holm stars as Nikolai in the film.

The film is based on a novel by Bjørg Vik with the same title. However, when the film was finished, the author thought it was so bad that she demanded that her name be removed from the film's credits and all marketing. The remuneration she received was donated to the Norwegian Authors' Union's solidarity fund.

== Cast ==
- Sverre Holm as Nikolai
- Gertie Jung as Ilni
- Birgitta Molin as Eva
- Berit Kullander as Helen
- Espen Skjønberg
- Helge Reiss
- Pål Skjønberg
- Randi Borch
