= Heksenetter =

- Directed by: Leif Sinding; Georg Løkkeberg
- Written by: Leif Sinding; Bjørn Bergh-Pedersen; Bjarne Andersen
- Based on: Leif Sinding's play Vampyren
- Produced by: Per Gunnar Jonson
- Starring: Georg Løkkeberg; Bab Christensen; Bjarne Andersen
- Cinematography: Per Gunnar Jonson
- Edited by: Eric Nordemar; Pierre Bardh
- Music by: Bjørn Woll
- Distributed by: Fotorama, Norenafilm
- Release date: 1954
- Running time: 71 minutes
- Country: Norway
- Language: Norwegian

Heksenetter (Witch Nights) is a Norwegian drama film from 1954, directed by Leif Sinding. Georg Løkkeberg appears in the main role as Major General Arthur Ranlow.

== Plot ==
The great war is in its final stages, and Major General Arthur Ranlow orders an attack on the enemy's nuclear facilities. He has an entirely personal motive for the attack because the officers he assigns are men that he suspects are flirting with his wife. All four officers die during the attack.

The plot moves forward in time, and Ranlow is in his living room. Sergeant Sander is his servant, and their existence is marked by occult interests. In their conversation, it appears that Ranlow has been fired from the army. Sander draws the curtains when he sees a strange woman outside. Ranlow orders her to enter the house and, when that happens, Ranlow's health and mental condition deteriorate.

== Cast ==
- Georg Løkkeberg: Major General Arthur Ranlow
- Bab Christensen: Lilian
- Bjarne Andersen: Sergeant Sander, servant
- Fridtjof Mjøen: Robert Norvald, doctor
- Ingerid Vardund: Vera Ranlow
- Rolf Falkenberg Smith: Major Venge
- Bjørn Bergh-Pedersen: Major Tregenna
- Folkman Schaanning: theater director
- Hjalmar Fries: Dr. Thorne
- Arvid Nilssen: cemetery worker
- Egil Hjorth-Jenssen: cemetery worker
- Richard Røgeberg: Lieutenant Lanner
- Wenche Løfsgård: woman in a nightclub
- Sidsel Meyer: woman in a nightclub
- Pelle Christensen: singer in a nightclub
- René Jacquet: advertising poster man
- Torhild Lindal: nurse
- Grethe Dahl: nurse
- Edith Ottosen: woman in a nightclub
- Oscar Amundsen: man in a nightclub
- Per Aaeng: young man with the theater director
- Kristin Larssen: little girl
- Margaret Pollen: dancer in a nightclub
- William Lewis: theater dancer
