= Himmel og helvete =

- Directed by: Øyvind Vennerød
- Written by: Øyvind Vennerød; Victor Borg
- Produced by: Anne Vennerød
- Starring: Lillebjørn Nilsen; Sigrid Huun; Georg Richter; Randi Borch
- Cinematography: Ragnar Sørensen
- Edited by: Øyvind Vennerød
- Music by: Egil Monn-Iversen
- Distributed by: Contact Film AS
- Release date: August 28, 1969
- Running time: 94 minutes
- Country: Norway
- Language: Norwegian

Himmel og helvete (Heaven and Hell) is a 1969 Norwegian propaganda film about illegal drugs. It was directed by Øyvind Vennerød with a screenplay by Vennerød and Victor Borg. The film was poorly received by the critics, but it nonetheless became one of the highest-grossing theater films in Norway in 1969. Lillebjørn Nilsen and Sigrid Huun played the main characters Arne and Eva.

The leading actor, Lillebjørn Nilsen, later apologized and publicly distanced himself from the movie.

== Plot ==
The film's action takes place in Oslo. It begins with a housewife coming home and finding her daughter Ingrid half-dead from using unspecified illegal drugs. The daughter dies a few hours later in the hospital. While the police search Ingrid's room, the drug dealer Johan shows up. The police find him suspicious, but they have no authority to arrest him. It later turns out that Johan works for the Yugoslav drug dealer Zatek, who smuggles hashish from Sweden using car tires. The student Oddvar also appears in the story; he also works for Zatek.

Later in the film, we meet two young people from the west end of Oslo, Eva and Arne, who hear the liberal psychologist Orheim claim that hashish is a safer drug than alcohol at a lecture during a high school assembly. At a party, the two young people together with some other students decide to smoke hashish that their friend Arne has stolen from his brother Oddvar. After smoking cannabis a couple of times, Eva and Arne want to get more. They first smoke the rest of what was left after the party. Later, Arne steals hashish from Oddvar, and at the same time Eva loses interest in her schoolwork. In desperation, both students ask Oddvar where they can get more hashish—to which Oddvar mentions Zatek, who works out of Club 13 (a reference to Club 7). Eva goes to bed with Zatek to get hashish. Zatek later becomes suspicious and kills Oddvar with a knife. While Eva's parents try to find out what is wrong with their daughter, and hear about Orheim's lecture at Club 13, Arne and Eva establish a connection with some hippies in Palace Park. They both spend the night with their new acquaintances in a condemned apartment in downtown Oslo.

Zatek is deported to Sweden after the authorities suspect that he is behind the murder of Oddvar. Eva, on the other hand, is admitted to a detox clinic. After a while, Eva escapes with Arne to Copenhagen to try new drugs. When Eva's mother learns that her daughter has run away, she is shocked. Eva's father kills Orheim with a paperweight. In Denmark, Eva and Lars end up in money trouble, and Eva begins prostituting herself to earn money for more drugs. During a wild LSD trip, Arne jumps from the roof over his hotel window and dies. The film ends with Eva in an LSD trip seeing herself in the mirror as a skinned corpse.

== Cast ==
- Sigrid Huun as Eva Falck
- Lillebjørn Nilsen as Arne
- Georg Richter as Ivar Falck
- Randi Kolstad as Berit, Eva's mother (credited as Randi Borch)
- Per Tofte as Zatek, a drug dealer
- Pål Skjønberg as Hermansen, a policeman
- Svein Sturla Hungnes as Rasmussen
- Per Jansen as Johan, Zatek's accomplice
- Arne Aas as Orheim, a psychologist
- Ingrid Øvre Wiik as Mrs. Lauritzen (credited as Ingrid Øvre)
- Arne Bang-Hansen as Trosdahl, a chief physician
- Kari Diesen as Arne's grandmother
- Svein Skaara as Knut Brenden
- Odd Jan Sandsdalen as a poet
- Ole Medbøe as Ole
- Inger Lise Rypdal as a pop singer
- Peter Anker as Per
- Elisabeth Bang as Mrs. Brenden
- Vibeke Falk as Aas, a teacher
- Egil Hjorth-Jenssen as a pawn operator
- Kirsten Oldgard as Bitten
- Kari Sunde as Randi
- Marianne Trosdahl
- Flemming Nielsen
- Bjørn Puggaard-Müller
- Vivi-Ann
