= Bjørn Bergh-Pedersen =

Norwegian actor, writer and film producer

- Born: October 18, 1919
- Died: December 30, 1993 (aged 74)
- Occupation(s): Film producer, actor, screenplay writer

Bjørn Bergh-Pedersen (October 18, 1919 – December 30, 1993) was a Norwegian film producer, actor, and screenplay writer. The film Stevnemøte med glemte år (Rendezvous with Forgotten Years), which he directed and wrote the screenplay for, represented Norway at the 7th Berlin International Film Festival in 1957.

== Filmography ==
- 1954: Heksenetter, assistant director; film script with Bjarne Andersen and Leif Sinding; actor in the role of Tregenna, a major
- 1956: Roser til Monica, actor in the role of Bengt Lie, the doctor
- 1957: Smuglere i smoking, executive producer
- 1957: Stevnemøte med glemte år, producer and screenwriter
- 1964: Nydelige nelliker, film script with Knut Bohwim and Knut Andersen based on Egil Lian's novel Drevne karer og ville jenter på strøket

== Radio plays ==
- 1965: Millionkuppet

== Lyrics ==
Bjørn Bergh-Pedersen wrote the lyrics to Bjørn Vold's song "Roser til Monica" (Roses for Monica). It was recorded by Gunnar Eide with the Billy Hills Orchestra on December 31, 1955. "Roser til Monica" was released on the 78-disc His Master's Voice AL 6008.
