= Sigval Maartmann-Moe =

Norwegian film director and screenwriter (1921–2010)

- Born: May 23, 1921; Kristiania, (now Oslo), Norway
- Died: June 7, 2010 (aged 89); Oslo, Norway
- Occupations: Film director and screenwriter

Sigval Maartmann-Moe (May 23, 1921 – June 7, 2010) was a Norwegian film director and screenwriter.

Maartmann-Moe made his debut as a film director in 1951 with Dei svarte hestane, which he directed together with Hans Jacob Nilsen. This debut was followed by the documentary film Fakkelen til Oslo (1952), Savnet siden mandag (1955), Peter van Heeren (1957), I slik en natt (1958), and Vår egen tid (1959). Maartmann-Moe also wrote the screenplays for the last three.

== Filmography ==
=== As director ===
- 1951: Dei svarte hestane
- 1952: Fakkelen til Oslo
- 1955: Savnet siden mandag
- 1957: Peter van Heeren
- 1958: I slik en natt
- 1959: Vår egen tid

=== As producer ===
- 1950: To mistenkelige personer
- 1951: Dei svarte hestane

=== As screenwriter ===
- 1957: Peter van Heeren
- 1958: I slik en natt
- 1959: Vår egen tid
