= Vinje Church, Telemark =

Church in Telemark, Norway

Vinje Church
- Vinje kyrkje
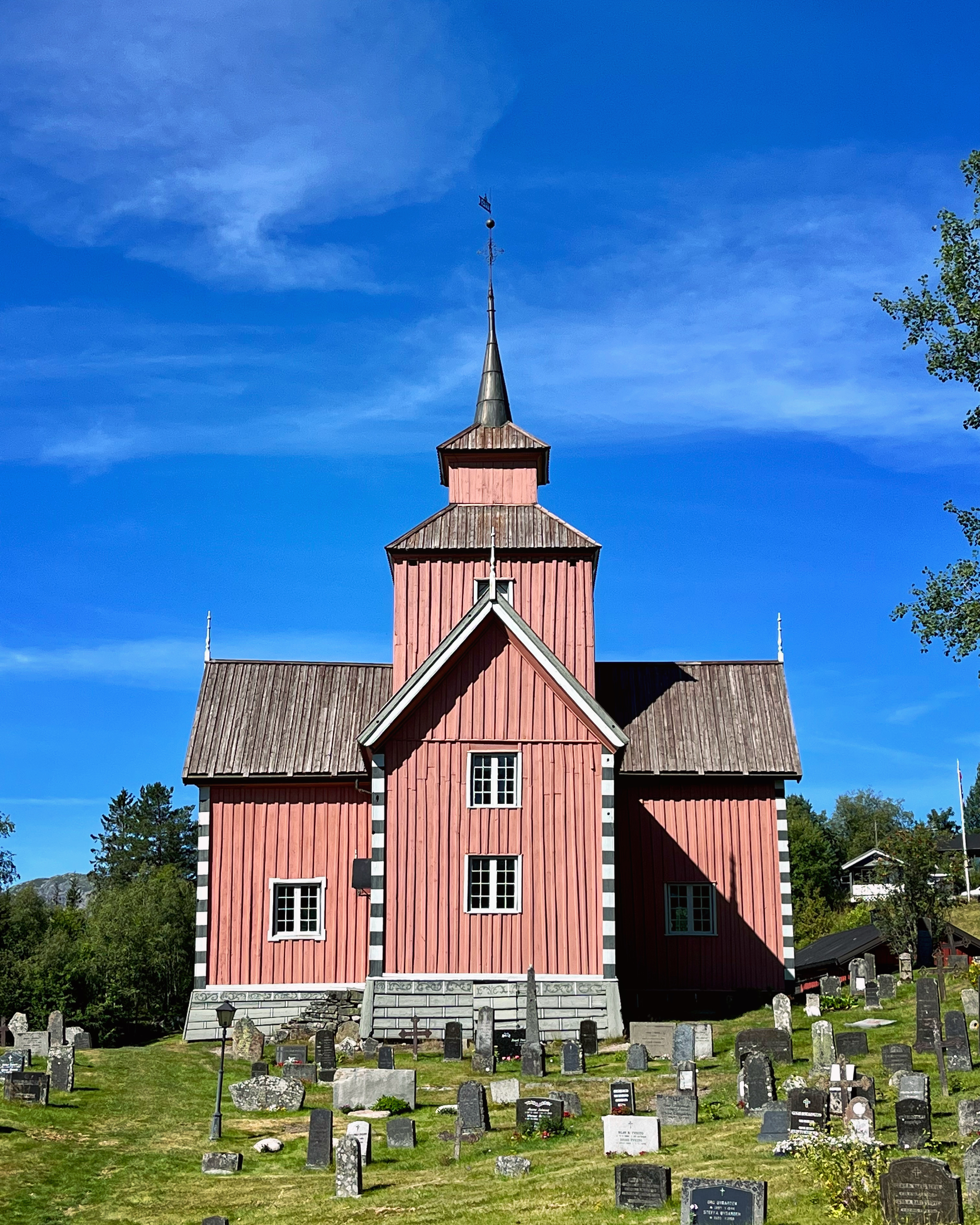
- View of the church
- Vinje Church
- 59°37′10″N 7°50′36″E
- Location: Vinje Municipality, Telemark
- Country: Norway
- Denomination: Church of Norway
- Previous denomination: Catholic Church
- Churchmanship: Evangelical Lutheran

History
- Status: Parish church
- Founded: 12th century
- Consecrated: 1796

Architecture
- Functional status: Active
- Architect: Jarand Rønjom
- Architectural type: Cruciform
- Completed: 1796 (230 years ago)

Specifications
- Capacity: 235
- Materials: Wood

Administration
- Diocese: Agder og Telemark
- Deanery: Øvre Telemark prosti
- Parish: Vinje og Nesland
- Norwegian Cultural Heritage Site
- Type: Church
- Status: Automatically protected
- ID: 85854

Vinje Church (Norwegian: Vinje kyrkje) is a parish church of the Church of Norway in Vinje Municipality in Telemark county, Norway. It is located in the village of Vinje. It is one of the churches for the Vinje og Nesland parish which is part of the Øvre Telemark prosti (deanery) in the Diocese of Agder og Telemark. The red, wooden church was built in a cruciform design in 1796 using plans drawn up by the architect Jarand Rønjom. The church seats about 235 people.

== History ==
The first church in Vinje was a wooden stave church that was built sometime between 1185 and 1202 (during the reign of King Sverre of Norway). The dating of the church is based on an inscription in the church, along with the general style of the design of the building. The runic inscription says Sigurþr jalssun ræist runar þesar lougardagen æftir Botolfsmæso er an flyþi higat ok vildi æigi ganga til sætar viþ Sverri foþurbana sin ok bræþra which means "Sigurd Jarlsson carved these runes on the Saturday after 'Botolvsmesse' [17 June], when he fled here and did not want to settle with Sverre, who murdered his father and brothers." This Sigurd was the son of the Jarl Erling Skakke (who died in 1179) and his brothers Magnus Erlingsson and Finn Erlingsson who died in 1184 and 1185 respectively. They were killed by Sverre who went on to be King of Norway. Thus, the inscription must have been carved around this time. In 1968, an archaeological excavation under the sacristy led to the discovery of some coins that were dated to 1177–1202, again dating of the church to around that time.

After centuries in use, the old church had fallen into disrepair by the late-1700s. In 1795, Jarand Rønjom was hired to design a new church to replace the old church. The old church was torn down and a new church was built on the same site. Like other churches designed by Rønjom, this new building was a cruciform church of log construction. The eastern transept contains the chancel and pulpit altar and the other three wings make up the nave. There are second floor seating galleries in all three wings that are supported by columns.

In 1814, this church served as an election church (Norwegian: valgkirke). Together with more than 300 other parish churches across Norway, it was a polling station for elections to the 1814 Norwegian Constituent Assembly which wrote the Constitution of Norway. This was Norway's first national elections. Each church parish was a constituency that elected people called "electors" who later met together in each county to elect the representatives for the assembly that was to meet at Eidsvoll Manor later that year.

== Media gallery ==
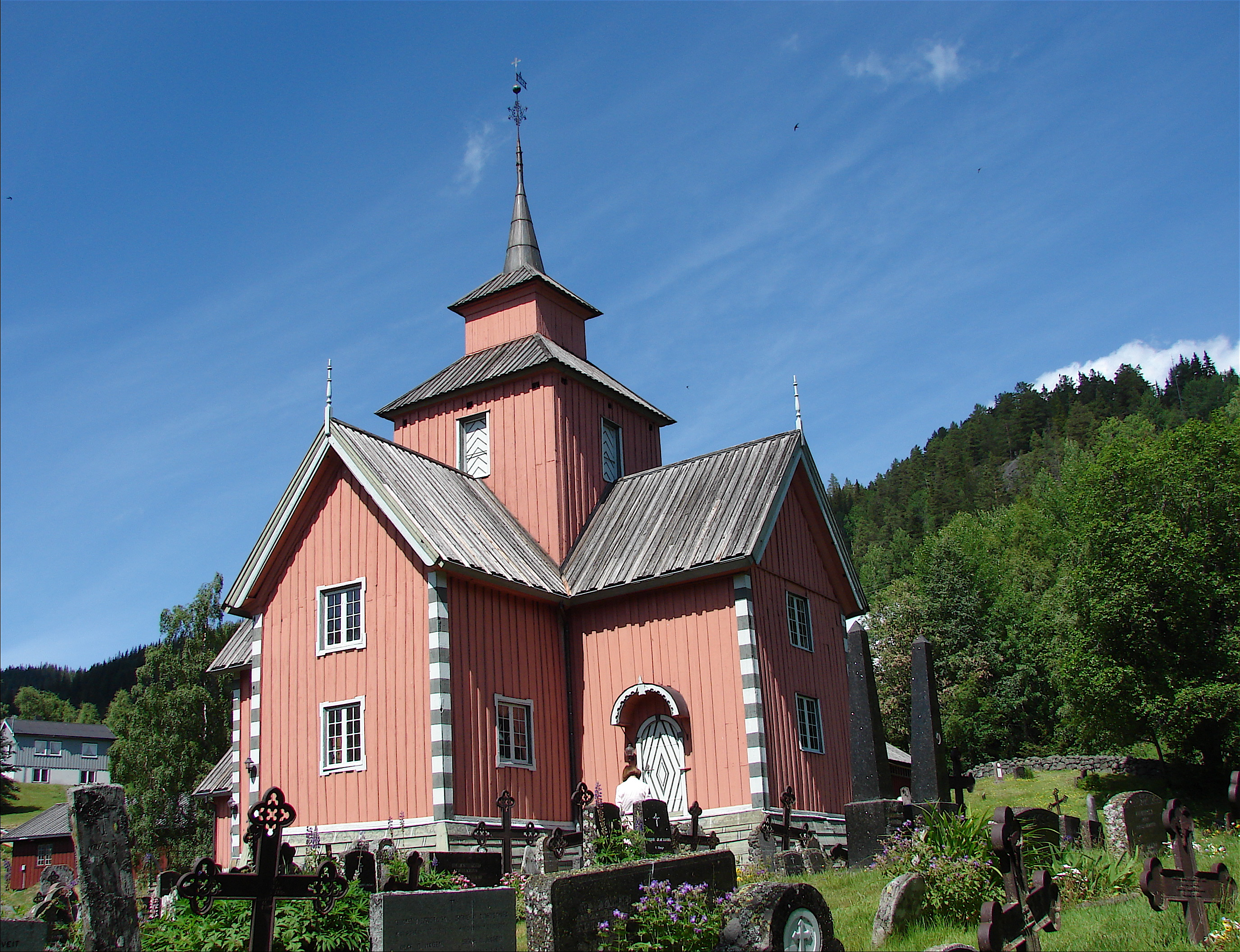

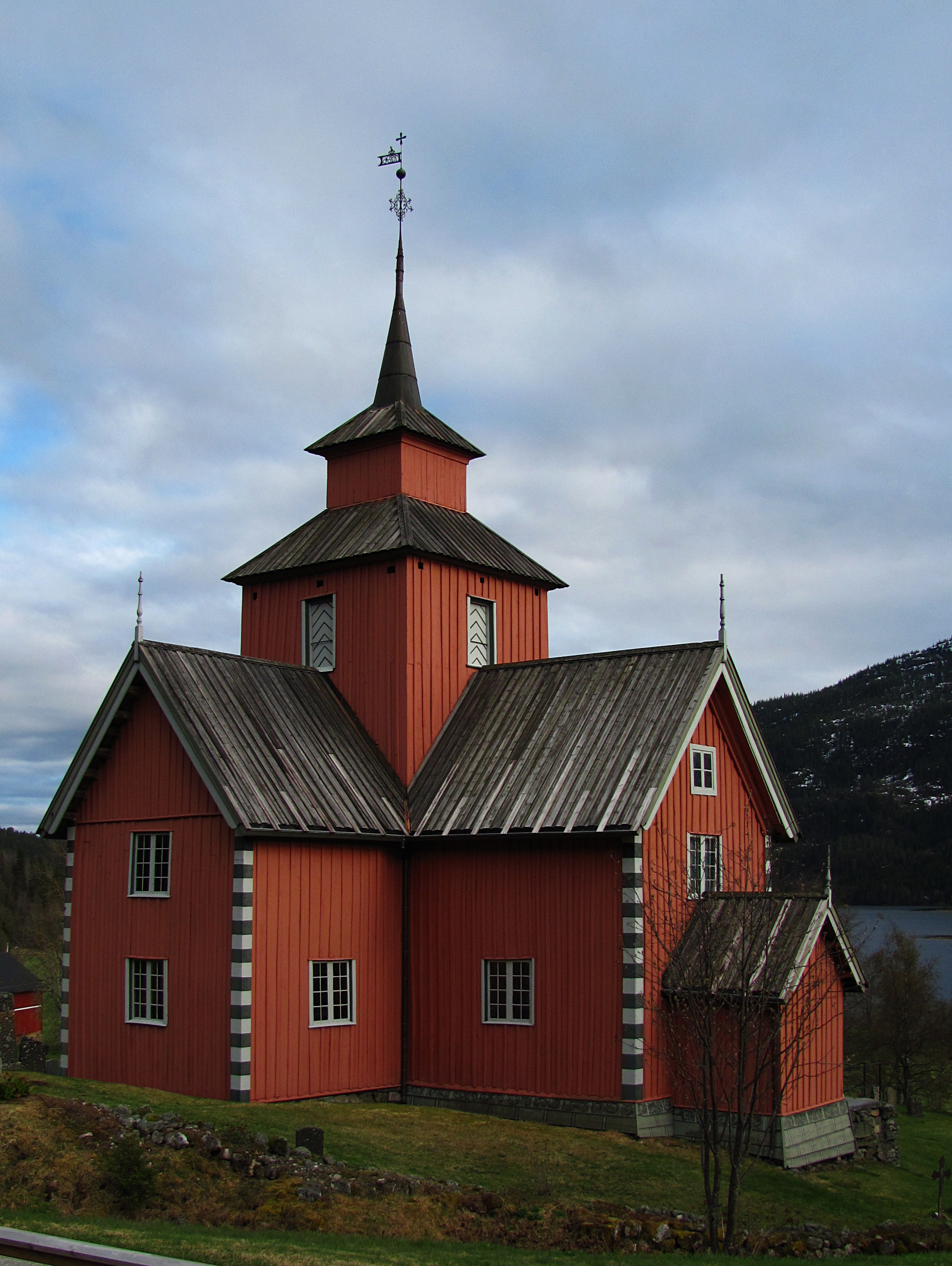

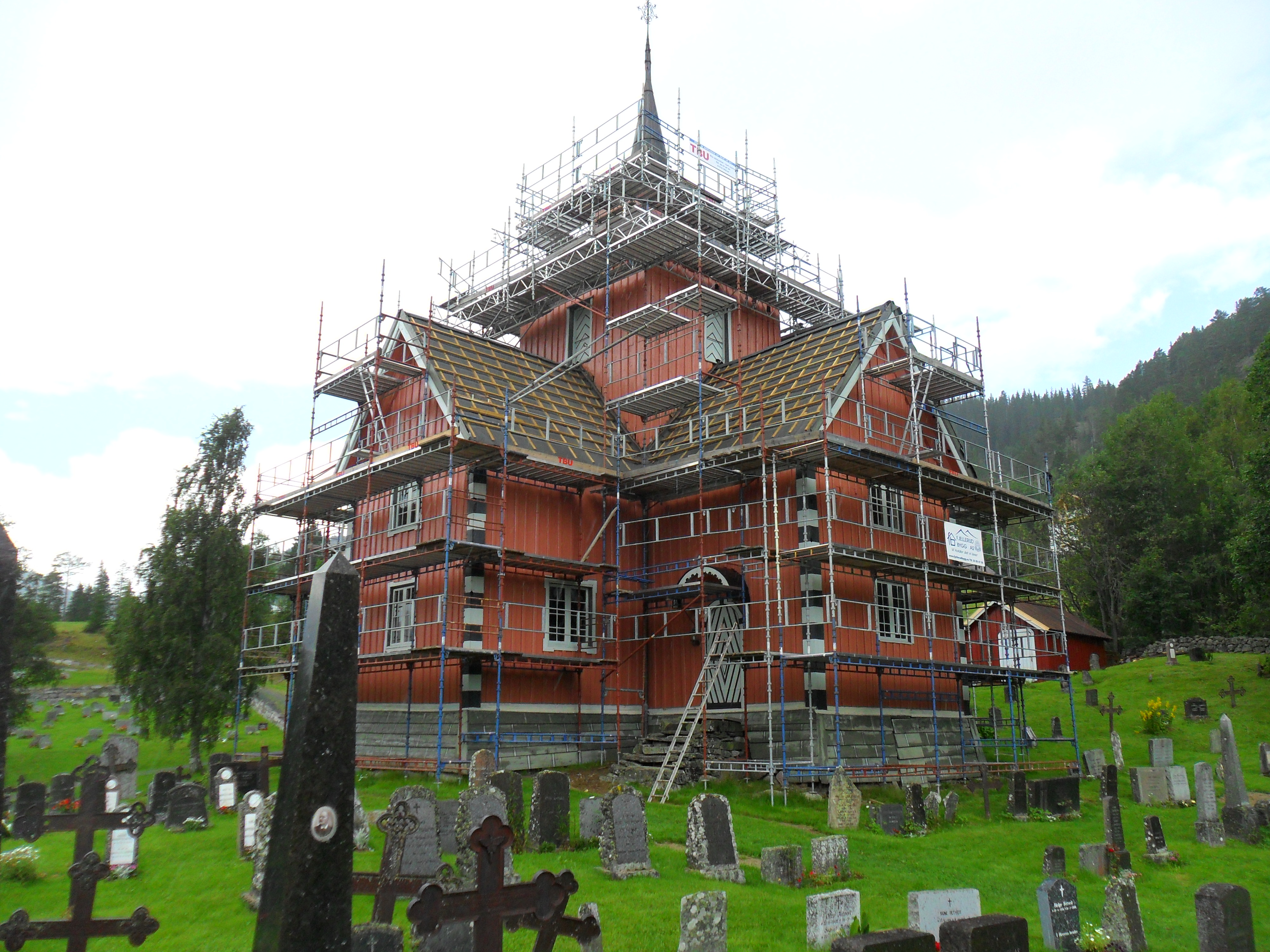

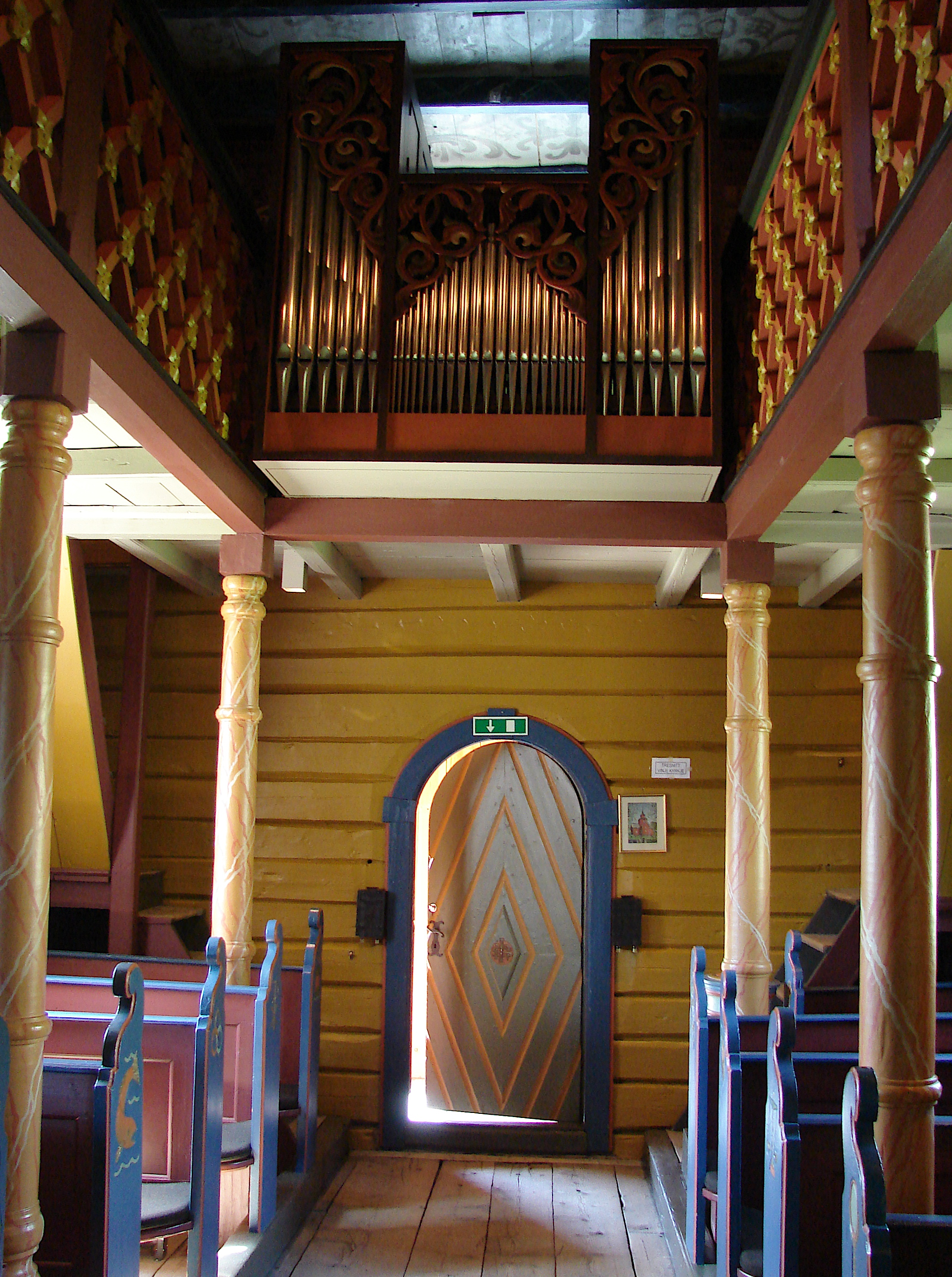
Interior

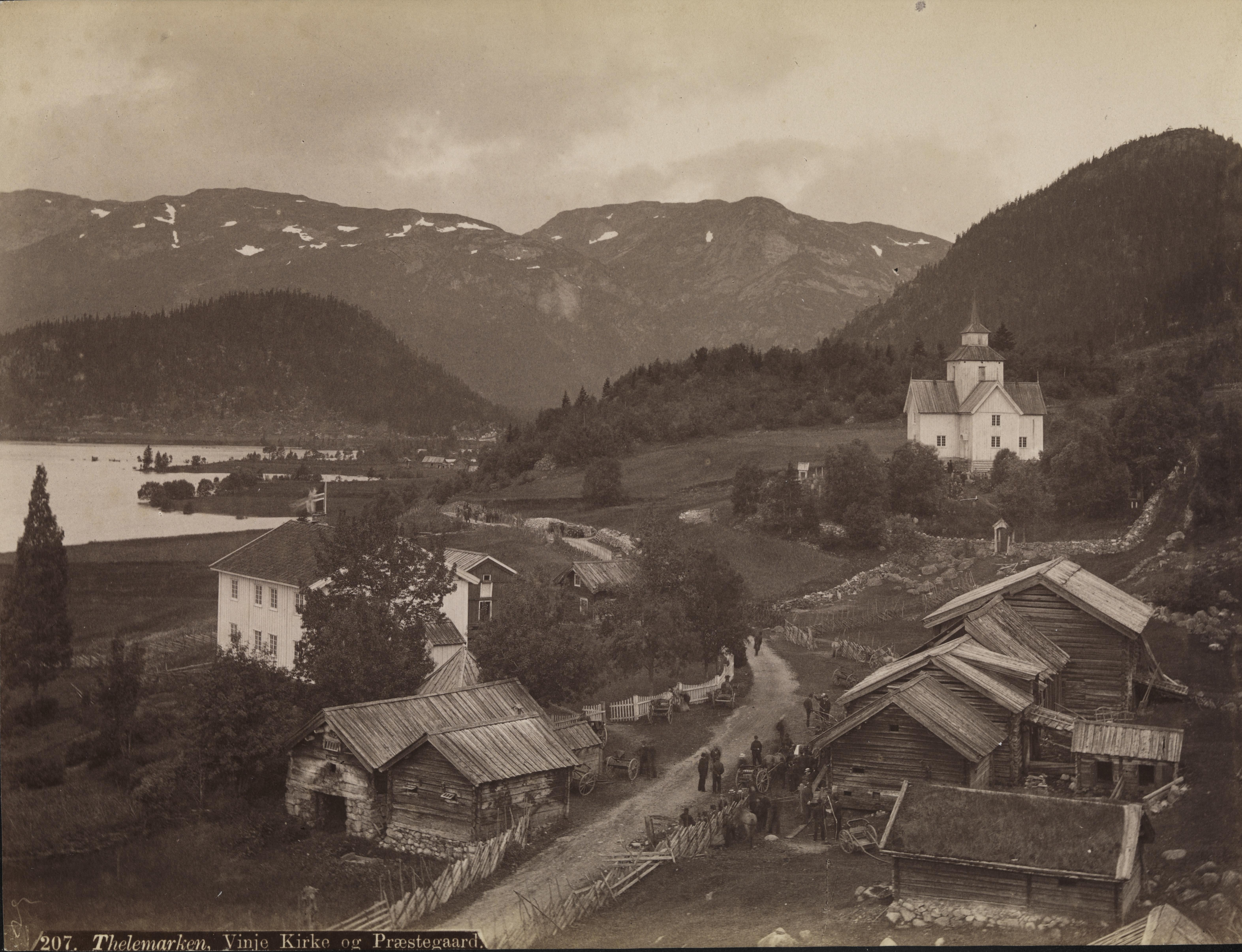
View of the church (c. 1885)

== See also ==
- List of churches in Agder og Telemark
