= The Summer Wind Blows =

1955 film

- Directed by: Åke Ohberg
- Written by: Ragnar Arvedson; Karl Ludvig Bugge
- Based on: The Summer Wind Blows by Per Bang
- Produced by: Åke Ohberg
- Starring: Lars Nordrum; Margit Carlqvist; Edvin Adolphson
- Cinematography: Karl-Erik Alberts
- Edited by: Ragnar Engström
- Music by: Harry Arnold; Sverre Bergh
- Production company: Sveafilm
- Distributed by: Sveafilm
- Release date: 21 February 1955
- Running time: 90 minutes
- Country: Sweden
- Language: Swedish

The Summer Wind Blows (Swedish: Ute blåser sommarvind) is a 1955 Swedish drama film directed by Åke Ohberg and starring Lars Nordrum, Margit Carlqvist and Edvin Adolphson. It was shot at the Sundbyberg Studios in Stockholm and on location in Oslo. The film's sets were designed by the art director Bibi Lindström.

== Synopsis ==
A Norwegian employee of an insurance company quits his job in Oslo and heads to Sweden. There he encounters two very different women both of whom appeal to him.

== Cast ==
- Lars Nordrum as Claus Aare
- Margit Carlqvist as Liss Strömberg
- Edvin Adolphson as Tore Andersson
- Sigge Fürst as 'Salta Biten'
- Douglas Håge as Station master
- Peter Lindgren as Gustav-Adolf Hållman
- Randi Kolstad as Eivor
- Elof Ahrle as Sverre
- Lillebil Kjellén as Mrs. Lindgren
- Kerstin Palo as Ingrid
- Sigrun Otto as Claus' Mother
- Rolf Christensen as Kristian Aare
- Karl Ludvig Bugge as Lindgren
- Kari Diesen as Woman at balcony
- Karin Hox as Young secretary
- John Melin as Merchant Johansson
- Fridtjof Mjøen as Engineer
- Arvid Nilssen as En gift mann
- Eugen Skjønberg as Arbeidsformannen

== Bibliography ==
- Qvist, Per Olov & von Bagh, Peter. Guide to the Cinema of Sweden and Finland. Greenwood Publishing Group, 2000.
