= Gunnar Skar =

Norwegian actor

- Born: July 5, 1923; Skjeberg, Norway
- Died: October 12, 2012 (aged 89); Oslo, Norway
- Resting place: Western Cemetery (Vestre gravlund), Oslo
- Occupation(s): Actor, theater director

Gunnar Julius Skar (July 5, 1923 – October 12, 2012) was a Norwegian actor and theater director.

== Career ==
During the 1940s, 1950s, and 1960s he worked as an actor and director at the New Theater and its successor, the Oslo New Theater. Skar also worked as a director for the Norwegian Theater and performed as an actor at the National Theatre in Oslo. He played two minor roles in the films To mistenkelige personer (1950) and Selkvinnen (1953).

== Family ==
Skar was born in Skjeberg, the son of Andreas Barnholdt Skar (1892–1990) and Esther Ulrikke Skar (née Johannessen, 1894–1988). He died in 2012 and is buried in Oslo's Western Cemetery.

== Filmography ==
- 1950: To mistenkelige personer
- 1953: Selkvinnen as Niclas, the bailiff's servant
