= Lasse Kolstad =

Norwegian actor and singer

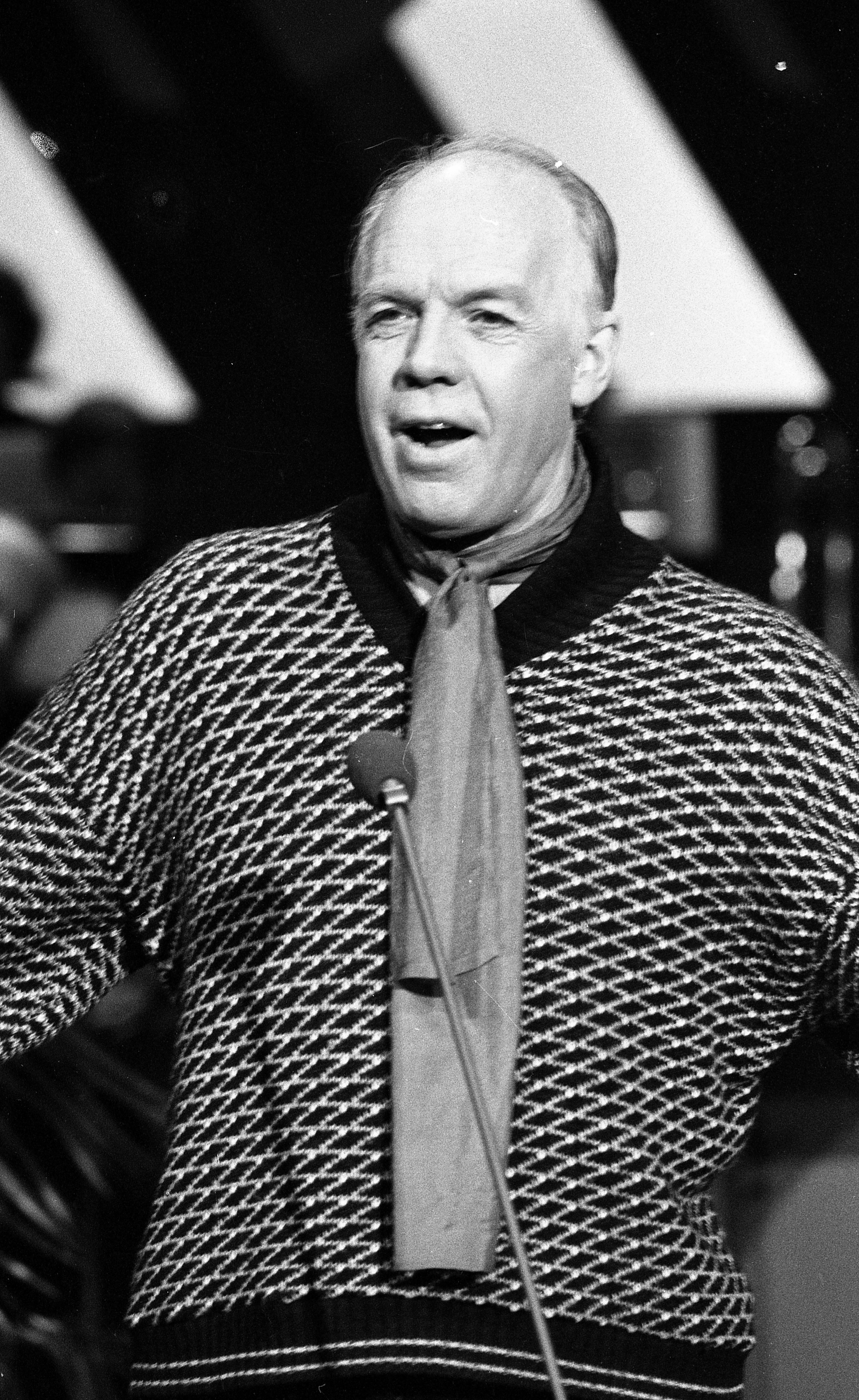
- Kolstad in 1980
- Born: 10 January 1922; Kristiania, Norway
- Died: 14 January 2012 (aged 90); Oslo, Norway
- Years active: 1943–2003
- Spouse(s): Randi Kolstad (1946–1955); Bab Christensen (1957–2012)

Lars "Lasse" Kolstad (10 January 1922 – 14 January 2012) was a Norwegian actor and singer. Active from the 1940s, he was known from many stage roles, but primarily as "Tevye" in Fiddler on the Roof.

As a secondary school student, Kolstad was president of the graduating class (russ) council of his school, and eventually for all of Oslo. As this was in 1940, the German occupation of Norway put a damper on any great festivities that year. In 1943 he had his début at Trøndelag Teater, where he remained until 1949. He has later worked at Centralteatret, Edderkoppen, Riksteatret, Fjernsynsteatret og Det Norske Teatret. He has had roles in plays by Ibsen, Shakespeare and Sophocles, and musicals such as Zorba and The Threepenny Opera. His best-known character though, was "Tevye" in Fiddler on the Roof, a role Kolstad played 400 times.

Kolstad also had various roles in movies and on television, and still took on occasional roles after his retirement. In 1958 he took part in the documentary Windjammer about the full-rigged ship Christian Radich. He played the title role in the television series Skipper Worse (1968), based on the novel by Alexander Kielland, and was a Viking in the American movie The Island at the Top of the World (1974).

Kolstad was married to the actress Bab Christensen; they lived in Oslo and had one child. His older brother Henki, who died in 2008, was also a well-known actor. His other older brother, Knut, was a politician.

== Select filmography ==
Year	Title	Role	Notes
1951	Dei svarte hestane	Peasant boy	
1953	Skøytekongen	Hans Hellemo	
1958	Windjammer: The Voyage of the Christian Radich	Himself	
1961	Hans Nielsen Hauge	Constable Ole Nielsen	
1961	Bussen	Lars	
1968	Skipper Worse	Skipper Worse	TV
1973	Kanarifuglen	Chief of personnel	
1974	Bortreist på ubestemt tid	Martin	
1974	Bortreist på ubestemt tid	Martin	
1974	The Island at the Top of the World	Erik	
1975	Fru Inger til Østråt	Olav Skaktavl	
1979	Olsenbanden og Dynamitt-Harry mot nye høyder	Roy	
1981	Fleksnes fataliteter	Chief of police	TV, 1 episode
1992	Bat Wings	Per	[Den nye kapellanen]
1994	The Julekalender	Narrator	
1996	Sånt är livet	Norwegian priest	
2003	Olsenbanden Jr. går under vann	Rudolf Bollerud	
2007	Kodenavn Hunter	Vice patrol	TV, 1 episode, (Last appearance)
