= Vi vil skilles =

- Directed by: Nils R. Müller
- Written by: Gaselle Müller; Nils R. Müller
- Produced by: Finn Carlsby
- Starring: Espen Skjønberg; Randi Kolstad
- Cinematography: Sverre Bergli
- Edited by: Olav Engebretsen
- Music by: Egil Monn-Iversen; Edvard Fliflet Bræin
- Distributed by: Kommunenes Filmcentral
- Release date: September 26, 1952
- Running time: 98 minutes
- Country: Norway
- Language: Norwegian

Vi vil skilles (We Want a Divorce) is a Norwegian comedy film from 1952 directed by Nils R. Müller. This was one of several "marriage comedies" in the 1950s and was a kind of sequel to Vi gifter oss (We're Getting Married), also directed by Müller. Arne Fjelberg, the priest at Uranienborg Church, played a priest in this film. The film starred Randi Kolstad and Espen Skjønberg.

== Plot ==
Ola and Bitten get married after a very short courtship. They buy a house together, but the house is much more expensive than they can really afford. When Bitten's mother encourages Ola to buy more expensive furniture for their house, things get even worse, and the financial responsibility weighs on Ola. At the same time, Bitten neglects the housework, and her romantic ideas about marriage soon begin to crack. However, the couple soon has a son, Morten, who immediately becomes the sole focus in the family. Bitten assumes the parenting role so much that she completely forgets Ola.

== Cast ==
- Randi Kolstad as Bitten Dahl
- Espen Skjønberg as Ola Berg
- Elisabeth Bang
- Finn Bernhoft as the mover
- Carl Hultman as the broker
- Gaselle Müller as Bente
- Morten Müller as Morten
- Lydia Opøien as Mrs. Dahl
- Paal Roschberg as André
- Per Skift as Leif
- Kirsten Sørlie as Mrs. Skau
