= Britta Lech-Hanssen =

Norwegian actress (1916–2007)

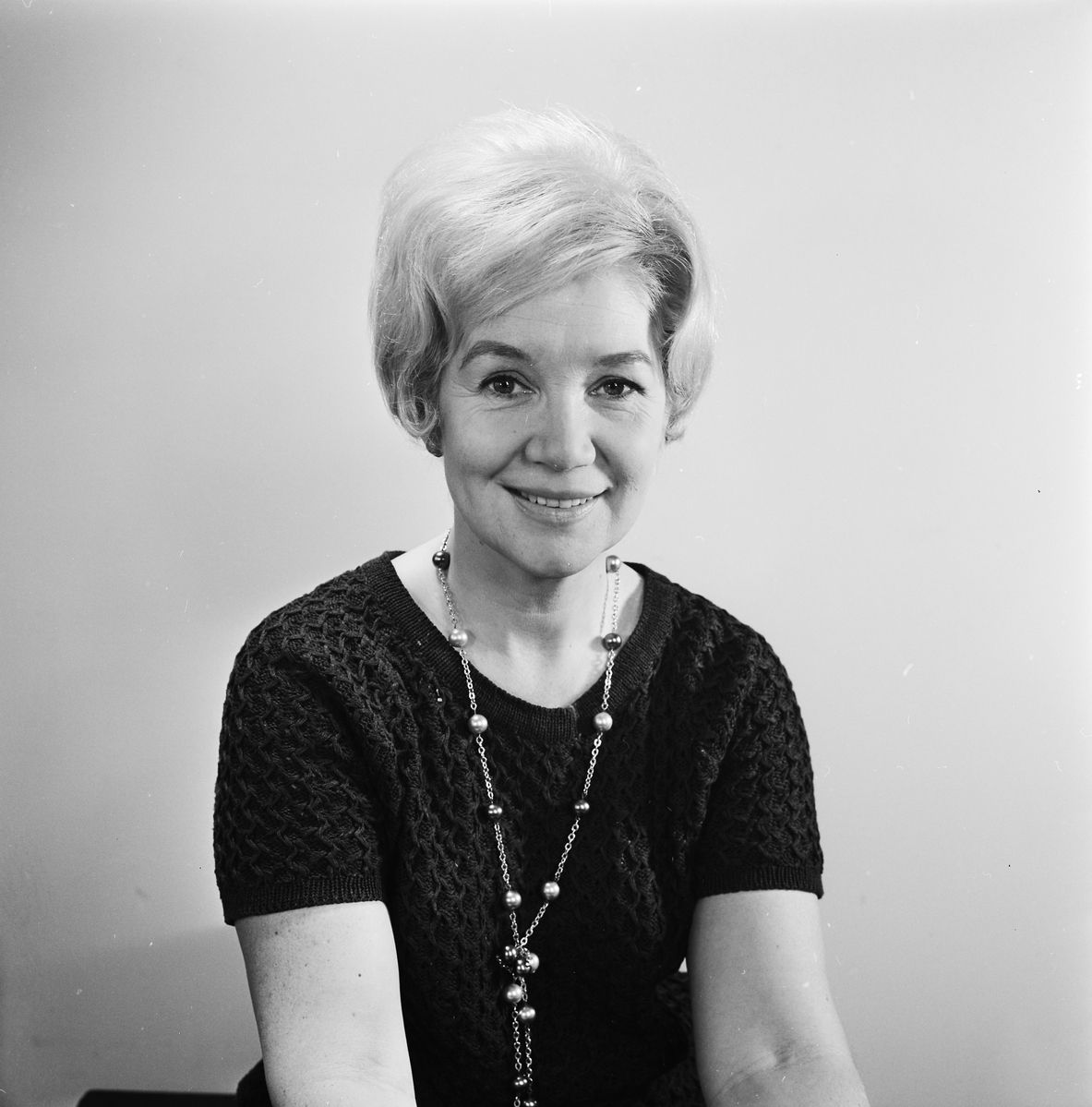
- Britta Lech-Hanssen in 1966
- Born: February 10, 1916; Narvik, Norway
- Died: February 22, 2007 (aged 91); Benalmádena, Spain
- Resting place: Western Cemetery (Vestre gravlund), Oslo
- Occupation: Actress

Britta Lech-Hanssen (born Karin Anna Britta Ericsson; February 10, 1916 – February 22, 2007) was a Norwegian actress.

== Career ==
Lech-Hanssen was engaged with the New Theater and then its successor, the Oslo New Theater, from 1947 to 1967. She also appeared in eight feature films between 1950 and 1970. She made her film debut in To mistenkelige personer.

== Family ==
Lech-Hanssen was born in Narvik, Norway. She was the daughter of the ship captain Arnold Halfdan Ericsson (1886–1954) and Karoline Johanna Blix (1894–1922). She married the opera singer Gerhard Lech-Hanssen (1916–1968) in 1939. She was the mother of the actor Gerhard Arnold Lech-Hansen (1941–1995).

== Filmography ==
- 1950: To mistenkelige personer as Anna
- 1953: Brudebuketten as the wife of the man traveling to Stockholm
- 1953: Den evige Eva as the maid
- 1955: Savnet siden mandag as Anna
- 1961: Et øye på hver finger as Mrs. Neslund
- 1961: Sønner av Norge
- 1964: Alle tiders kupp as Granlund's wife
- 1970: Døden i gatene
