= Per Skift =

Norwegian actor (1920–1994)

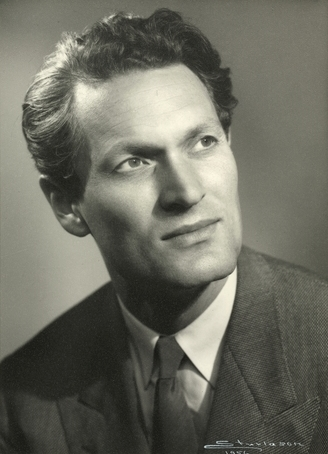
- Per Skift in 1956
- Born: May 10, 1920; Kristiania (now Oslo), Norway
- Died: January 10, 1994 (aged 73); Oslo, Norway
- Occupation: Actor

Per Skift (born Per Anker Christensen, May 10, 1920 – January 10, 1994) was a Norwegian actor.

== Career ==
Skift made his stage debut in 1944 at Chat Noir in Oslo. He was then engaged with the Oslo New Theater, Trøndelag Theater, and Rogaland Theater until he started performing for the National Traveling Theater in 1972. Skift is best known his performances in operettas and musicals such as Die Fledermaus, Annie Get Your Gun, and Carmen.

Alongside his stage career, Skift also appeared in eight films between 1946 and 1964. He made his film debut in Toralf Sandø's Englandsfarere.

== Filmography ==
- 1946: Englandsfarere as Arnfinn
- 1949: Aldri mer! (campaign film)
- 1952: Vi vil skilles as Leif
- 1954: Shetlandsgjengen as Bård Grotle
- 1957: Peter van Heeren as Peter van Heeren
- 1959: 5 loddrett as Jens
- 1962: Operasjon Løvsprett
- 1964: Nydelige nelliker
