= Kaare Sæther =

Norwegian musician

- Born: October 13, 1920; Bærums Verk, Norway
- Died: February 12, 1987 (aged 66); Harestua, Norway
- Occupation: Violinist

Kaare Sæther (October 23, 1920 – February 12, 1987) was a Norwegian violinist, philharmonic member, and violin teacher.

Sæther was born in Bærums Verk, Norway. In 1944 he married Ellen Ekelund, with whom he had three daughters. Sæther studied violin with Øivin Fjeldstad. He played as a violinist with the Oslo Philharmonic from 1945 to 1985. Sæther debuted as a soloist at the University Hall (Norwegian: Universitetets Aula) in Oslo in 1946 accompanied by Robert Levin.

Kaare Sæther died in Harestua, Norway. He and his wife Ellen Sæther are buried at Grua Church.

== Orchestral career ==
As a student of Øivin Fjeldstad, Sæther played in Fjeldstad's chamber orchestra, later the Youth Chamber Orchestra (Norwegian: De unges kammerorkester), and he began to play early in his career with the Philharmonic Society Orchestra, as the Oslo Philharmonic Orchestra was then called. After he married, to support his family he became involved in the orchestra at the German Theater (German: Deutsches Theater) at Stortingsgata 16. In the summer of 1945, he auditioned for a vacant position in the philharmonic, where he was placed in first chair in the second violin group next to the German violinist Walter Werner. Sæther led the second violin group for over 35 years, sharing first chair in alternation with Walter Werner, Bjørn Woll, Borghild Nygaard, Peter Hindar, Noralf Glein, and Kåre Fuglesang. For the last three seasons, from 1982 to 1985, he occupied second chair in the group and performed together with four former students in the first chair in both violin groups: Terje Tønnesen, John Arne Hirding, Jørn Halbakken, and Frode Hoff.

Sæther was a talented orchestral musician that could play everything placed on the music stand in front of him prima vista, regardless of difficulty. His musical memory was remarkable, and he was able to explain in detail the interpretations and technical solutions of both conductors and guest soloists during the forty years he worked in the orchestra. As the "orchestra's memory," he was a valuable source of knowledge about the philharmonic's inner workings and staff history. Via his teacher Øivin Fjeldstad—and his teacher Gustav Fredrik Lange—he could trace the Norwegian orchestral tradition back to the time of Iver Holter, Johan Halvorsen, and Johan Svendsen. Little of Sæther's knowledge about this tradition was written down or preserved for posterity.

== As soloist ==
Over the years, Sæther played many solo programs on NRK, where he premiered new Norwegian music and gave first-time performances in Norway of music by many foreign composers. He was the first Norwegian to played Alban Berg's Violin Concerto with the philharmonic, and as a soloist with the philharmonic in the Oslo Concert Hall he performed Klaus Egge's Concerto for Violin and Orchestra, which was also broadcast on radio. Sæther also played Igor Stravinsky's Violin Concerto in D with the philharmonic on NRK. Sæther and Bjarne Larsen received good reviews for a sweepingly beautiful performance of Johann Sebastian Bach's Concerto for Two Violins and Orchestra in D Minor. He also performed the great classical violin concertos by Beethoven, Mendelssohn, Bruch, Brahms, and Tchaikovsky. He performed these enthusiastically together with good amateur orchestras in Eastern Norway. Among Norwegian works, he premiered Leif Solberg's violin sonata on NRK Radio with Ebba Isene at the piano.

== Violin teacher ==
In 1959, the Veitvet Music School was established at Olav Selvaag's initiative and financed by him. The music school quickly developed into a vocational music school and conservatory, and Kaare Sæther was engaged by the conservatory as a violin teacher. For 28 years until his sudden death in February 1987, he was a valued educator first at Veitvet, and later at the school's locations in the Godlia neighborhood in Oslo's Østensjø borough. For a number of years, he and his colleague Leif Jørgensen contributed to making the Eastern Norway Conservatory of Music a vital and competitive supplement to the Norwegian Academy of Music for string instruments. Sæther taught solo performance and also conducted the conservatory's orchestra for many years with enthusiasm and extensive knowledge of the repertoire. Among his hundreds of students, many have had a strong presence in Norwegian music life. The philharmonic's first concertmaster Terje Tønnesen, second concertmaster John Arne Hirding, and violinists Jørn Halbakken, Frode Hoff, Tove Halbakken Resell, Lise Strandli, Hans Morten Stensland, and Vegard Johnsen all studied under Sæther. The Bergen Philharmonic Orchestra, Trondheim Symphony Orchestra, Stavanger Symphony Orchestra, Norwegian Radio Orchestra, and Norwegian National Opera and Ballet Orchestra also have musicians that studied under Sæther in their string sections. The composer and violinist Ole Henrik Moe studied violin with Sæther. Other prominent students of Sæther include Erik Fossum Svendsen, John Westbye, and Øivind Nussle. The violinist and ensemble leader Olaf Aasen is also a Sæther student.
