= Så møtes vi imorgen =

1946 film

- Directed by: Nils R. Müller
- Written by: Nils R. Müller
- Based on: Alex Brinchmann's novel Så møtes vi imorgen
- Produced by: Chris Ravn; Bjarne Stokland
- Starring: Georg Richter; Helen Brinchmann; Ola Isene
- Cinematography: Ragnar Sørensen
- Edited by: Titus Vibe-Müller
- Music by: Sverre Arvid Bergh
- Distributed by: UNO-Film A/S
- Release date: April 22, 1946
- Running time: 98 minutes
- Country: Norway
- Language: Norwegian

Så møtes vi imorgen (English: See You Tomorrow) is a 1946 Norwegian drama film directed by Nils R. Müller. It was Müller's debut film. It is based on the novel of the same name by Alex Brinchmann and it was adapted for film by Müller. The film tells the story of the young maladapted Steffen Berg, played by Georg Richter.

== Plot ==
The young student Steffen Berg has difficulty adapting to society's laws and rules. After interrupting his medical studies, he starts working in a shop to support his family together with his brother Jørgen and his sister Gerda, and to keep his mother from moving to a retirement home. One of Steffen's friends is going to America with his wife and needs money. Steffen takes 500 kroner from the store's cash register. The next day there is an audit, and Steffen's theft is discovered. His brother pays back the money in exchange for the store dropping the charges.

Steffen starts working in a greenhouse, and in the evenings he studies art history. A paper he writes about the Parthenon is well received. Steffen decided to continue his studies. His past, however, makes it impossible for him to receive a scholarship and, after a conflict with his brother, he wanders the streets of Oslo. When Steffen passes Henrik Storm's office, he hears a shot fired and sees a man leaving the place in a car. Some time later, Steffen saves a little girl from being run over by a car. The girl's parents are very grateful and, when they hear that he is unemployed, they offer him a job as a gardener.

At his new employer's, Steffen recognizes a man from Storm's office named Konrad. In the newspapers he reads that Storm has been murdered. Steffen wants to go to the police, but he changes his mind at the last minute after being persuaded by Konrad's wife Marit. Marit is much younger than her husband, and she is attracted to the young Steffen. Steffen also learns that Storm was attracted to Marit and that Konrad killed him out of jealousy.

One night Konrad unexpectedly finds Steffen and Marit together. He later takes Steffen on a trip to the mountains. It soon becomes clear to Steffen that Konrad intends to kill him. Steffen jerks the steering wheel of the car they are driving, and the vehicle drives off the road. Konrad dies and Steffen survives.

== Cast ==
- Georg Richter as Steffen Berg
- Ola Isene as Konrad Kraft
- Helen Brinchmann as Marit Kraft
- Harald Heide Steen as Jørgen Berg
- Unni Torkildsen as Gerda Berg
- Ellen Isefiær as Mrs. Berg, Steffen's mother
- Einar Vaage as Rasmussen
- Helge Essmar as the prison warden
- Alfred Helgeby as the museum director
- Stevelin Urdahl as the politician
- Jack Fjeldstad as the police inspector
- Alf Sommer as the warehouse manager
- Pehr Qværnstrøm as the office manager
- Pål Skjønberg as Erik, a friend of Steffen
- Elisabeth Bang as Erik's girlfriend
- Knut Yran as the pawnbroker
- Gudrun Heide as the bedsit landlady
- Knut Myrvold as the detective
- Bjarne Bø as a gardener
- Per Eigil Hansson as a gardener
