= Lydia Opøien =

Norwegian actress (1894–1961)

- Born: November 4, 1894; Trondheim, Norway
- Died: November 24, 1961 (aged 67)
- Occupation: Actress

Lydia Marie Opøien (November 4, 1894 – November 24, 1961) was a Norwegian actress.

Among other venues, Opøien was engaged with the Oslo New Theater, the Norwegian Theater in Oslo, and the Trøndelag Theater. She also worked with the NRK Radio Theater. Alongside her theater career she was also a film actress. Opøien appeared in twelve films between 1933 and 1957, with her screen debut in Jeppe på bjerget.

She was the lawyer Adam Hiorth's second wife.

== Filmography ==
- 1933: Jeppe på bjerget as Nille
- 1940: Godvakker-Maren as Mrs. Bjørn
- 1942: En herre med bart as Rosa Niehlsen
- 1942: Trysil-Knut as a servant girl
- 1946: Englandsfarere as Johanne Volden
- 1951: Kranes konditori as Mrs. Krane
- 1951: Storfolk og småfolk as Mari Smehaugen
- 1952: Vi vil skilles as Mrs. Dahl
- 1953: Selkvinnen as Dorothea, a servant at the Hammershaimb house
- 1953: Skøytekongen as Hellemo's wife
- 1954: Aldri annet enn bråk as Mrs. Ramberg
- 1957: Ni liv as Jordmoren (the midwife)
