= Skøytekongen =

1953 film

- Directed by: Nils R. Müller
- Written by: Sigbjørn Hølmebakk
- Based on: A concept by Bjørn Storberget
- Starring: Lasse Kolstad; Sidsel Meyer; Espen Skjønberg; Harald Heide Steen
- Cinematography: Sverre Bergli
- Edited by: Olav Engebretsen
- Music by: Maj Sønstevold
- Distributed by: Kommunenes Filmcentral
- Release date: October 1, 1953
- Running time: 91 minutes
- Country: Norway
- Language: Norwegian

Skøytekongen (The Skating King) is a black-and-white Norwegian drama film from 1953 directed by Nils R. Müller. The script was written by Sigbjørn Hølmebakk based on a concept by Bjørn Storberget. The film stars Lasse Kolstad and Sidsel Meyer.

== Plot ==
Skating king Hans Hellemo grew up under difficult conditions. His father's highest dream in life was for his son to go to college. Hans works as a truck driver, and the rest of the time he practices skating. His father watches with bitterness how his son's friends go off to college one by one, while his son is still working. Eventually it dawns on Hans that it is not enough to just be a skating king. He marries and has children. Hans wants to retire from the sport, but his fame prevents him: the people keep demanding that he show up. With the help of his wife, however, he takes the step and prepares for his last big race.

== Cast ==
- Lasse Kolstad as Hans Hellemo
- Sidsel Meyer as Kitten Slåttan
- Espen Skjønberg as Høye, a journalist
- Harald Heide Steen as Slåttan, a skating coach
- Eugen Skjønberg as Hellemo, a truck driver
- Lydia Opøien as Hellemo's wife
- Bjarne Andersen as a disabled sports fan
- Haakon Arnold
- Arne Bang-Hansen
- Bjarne Bø
- Joachim Calmeyer
- Edvard Drabløs
- Dan Fosse
- Bonne Gauguin
- Sverre Hansen
- Harald Heide-Steen Jr.
- Joachim Holst-Jensen
- Elsa Isefiær
- Torhild Lindal
- Alf Malland
- Maja Lise Rønneberg
- Pål Skjønberg
- Alfred Solaas
- Astrid Sommer
- Johan Sverre
- Axel Thue
- Einar Vaage
- Ottar Wicklund
