= Berit Kullander =

Norwegian actress (born 1938)

- Born: March 23, 1938 (age 86); Oslo, Norway
- Occupation: Actress

Berit Kullander (born March 23, 1938) is a Norwegian actress, dancer, and singer.

Kullander performed in the Norwegian Opera Company's productions of the ballets Swan Lake and La Sylphide. After that she danced at Chat Noir from 1954 to 1965. At the Norwegian Theater from 1965 to 1967, her roles included Anita in West Side Story and the secretary in the stage adaptation of Franz Kafka's The Trial. For six seasons she was at the National Swedish Touring Theatre (1967–1972), Intimate Theater, and Oscar Theater. She performed with the Norwegian National Traveling Theater from 1976 to 2005. In addition, she toured with Jens Book-Jenssen.

== Filmography ==
- 1956: Gylne ungdom as a dancer
- 1962: Operasjon Løvsprett as Goggen's girlfriend
- 1965: Klimaks
- 1966: Kontorsjef Tangen (television) as the lady at the information desk
- 1968: Festival i Venedig (television) as a starlet
- 1971: Gråt elskede mann as Helen
