= Folkman Schaanning =

Norwegian actor (1886–1964)

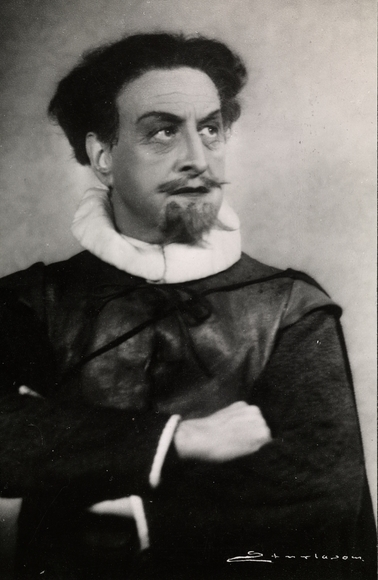
- Folkman Schaanning in 1944
- Born: August 17, 1886; Trondheim, Norway
- Died: January 1, 1964 (aged 77)
- Occupation: Actor

Folkman Schaanning (August 17, 1886 – January 1, 1964) was a Norwegian actor. He appeared in several films.

== Filmography ==
- 1934: En stille flirt (Norwegian version) as Swanson, a photographer
- 1938: Bør Børson Jr. as the office manager
- 1940: Tante Pose as the provost
- 1940: Tørres Snørtevold as Anton Jessen
- 1941: Gullfjellet as the professor
- 1942: Det æ'kke te å tru as the master barber
- 1943: Den nye lægen as Pastor Reimers
- 1943: Sangen til livet as Storm, a doctor
- 1946: Et spøkelse forelsker seg as the admiral
- 1948: Trollfossen as the impresario
- 1948: Kampen om tungtvannet as the civil engineer
- 1949: Vi flyr på Rio as Hazel, a professor
- 1952: Nødlanding as the frightened painter
- 1952: Andrine og Kjell as a bank manager
- 1954: Portrettet as Johansen, an editor
- 1954: Heksenetter as the theater director
