= Adam Hiorth (barrister) =

Norwegian barrister and playwright

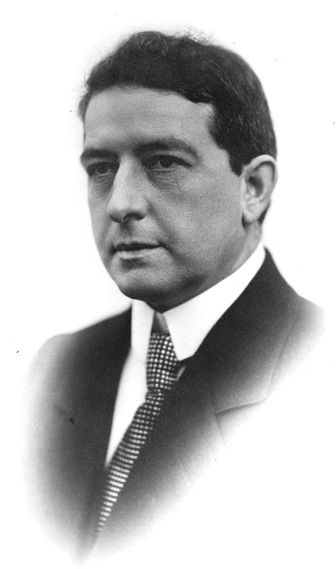
Adam Hiorth, 1922

Adam Hiorth (5 January 1879 – 1961) was a Norwegian barrister and playwright.

He was born in Spydeberg as a son of director Wilhelm Fredrik Hiorth (1850–1923) and Konstanse Hansen (1856–1943). He was married to stenographer Dagny Munthe Aalheim from 1915, later to actress Lydia Marie Opøien.

== Career ==
He finished his secondary education in 1897, finished training as a conscript officer in 1898 and graduated from the Royal Frederick University with the cand.jur. degree in 1904. He was a deputy judge from 1904 to 1905, attorney in Gjøvik from 1905, and manuduktør from 1907 to 1917, especially in Roman law. He practiced as a barrister in Kristiania from 1914 to 1954. He was also known as public defender during the legal purge in Norway after World War II.

He was interested in theatre, and wrote the children's comedy Peik og stortrollet which was staged at Nationaltheatret in 1922. He also translated several plays. Peik og stortrollet premiered on 23 December 1922, and run for a total of 29 performances until 18 February 1923. Gunvor Arntzen played the princess, and Aagot Nissen played the sister of the troll.

He became secretary of the board in the Norwegian Students' Society while Bille Aubert was the society's leading figure. His student's comedy Paa Hybelen, first staged in Spring 1900, was met with enthusiasm from the public, but not by the critics. The comedy was again staged in 1906, and at the society's 100th anniversary in 1913. Hiort was regarded as one of the two leading songwriters of the society in the early 1900s, along with Leif Rode. Among his popular songs was "Nøff, nøff", written for the 50th anniversary of the Order of the Golden Pig in 1909. Hiorth himself chaired the Norwegian Students' Society in 1907, and served as the society's economist from 1927 to 1929. He died in 1961.
