= Randi Kolstad =

Norwegian actress (1925–1999)

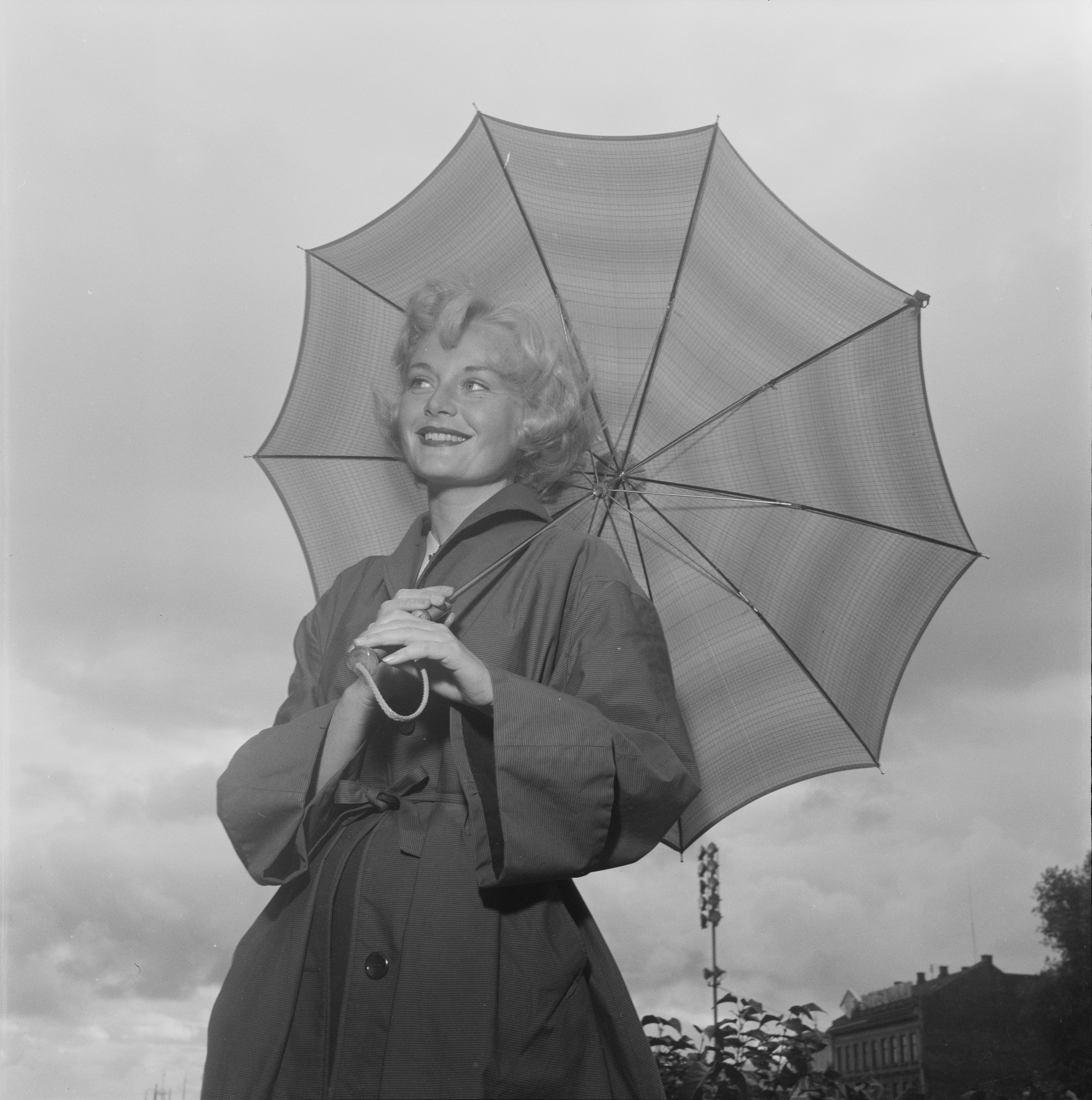
- Kolstad in 1954
- Born: Randi Ballestad; May 23, 1925; Skien, Norway
- Died: October 6, 1999 (aged 74); Oslo, Norway
- Occupation: Actress
- Spouse: Lasse Kolstad (1946–1955)

Randi Kolstad (born Randi Ballestad, later known as Randi Borch, May 23, 1925 – October 6, 1999) was a Norwegian theater and screen actress.

Kolstad made her film debut in 1951 in Kranes konditori. She appeared in 14 films. She participated in preparing the script for the 1954 film Portrettet.

== Family ==
Randi Kolstad was the daughter of the associate professor Thor Ballestad (1891–1970) and Hjørdis Marie Ruud (1902–1973). She was married to the actor Lasse Kolstad from 1946 to 1955. She later married Hans Jacob Astrup Borch (1924–1996) and took the surname Borch.

== Filmography ==
- 1951: Kranes konditori as Borghild Stordal
- 1952: Nødlanding as Kristin
- 1952: Vi vil skilles as Bitten Dahl
- 1953: Brudebuketten as Siv Blom
- 1955: The Summer Wind Blows as Eivor, engaged to Klaus
- 1956: På solsiden as Ester Riibe, Hartvig's wife
- 1957: Seventeen Years Old as Lydia Hennert, a singer
- 1958: Lån meg din kone as Anita (credited as Randi Borch)
- 1962: Sønner av Norge kjøper bil as Anette Winkelbo
- 1964: Klokker i måneskinn as the wife (credited as Randi Borch)
- 1966: Hurra for Andersens as Mrs. Hermansen (credited as Randi Borch)
- 1969: Himmel og helvete as Berit, Eva's mother (credited as Randi Borch)
- 1971: Gråt elskede mann (credited as Randi Borch)
