= Englandsfarere =

- Directed by: Toralf Sandø
- Written by: Sigurd Evensmo (novel); Victor Borg; Toralf Sandø (script)
- Starring: Knut Wigert; Jørn Ording
- Cinematography: Per G. Jonson
- Release date: 22 April 1946
- Running time: 107 minutes
- Country: Norway
- Language: Norwegian

Englandsfarere (English: We Leave for England) is a 1946 Norwegian war film directed by Toralf Sandø, starring Knut Wigert and Jørn Ording.

== Plot ==
The film follows the Norwegian resistance fighters Harald (Wigert) and Arild (Ording) in their flight from the Gestapo.

== Cast ==
- Knut Wigert as Harald Silju
- Jørn Ording as Arild Jørn
- Ola Isene as Peder
- Elisabeth Bang as Hilde, sykepleierske
- Ingeborg Cook as Torild
- Sigurd Magnussøn as Skipperen
- Johannes Eckhoff as Bjørn Hjelm
- Per Skift as Arnfinn
- Claus Wiese as Normann
- Bjarne Larsen as Jonas
- Gudmund Vold as Knut, skipperens sønn
- Pål Skjønberg as Torbjørn Dalsberg
- Gunnar Jakobsen as Torkild
- Kåre Wicklund as Espen Stordalen
- Per Røtvold as Knotten
- Harald Aimarsen as Josef
- Kåre Johansen as Tønnes
- Erik Løchen as Eivind
- Lydia Opøien as Johanne Volden
- Elsa Sandø as Mor til Bjørn Hjelm
- Oscar Egede-Nissen as Cramer
- Helge Essmar as Mörner
- Stevelin Urdahl as Drømmeren
- Kristen Dahl as Suggen, fangevokteren
- Karl Eilert Wiik as Kommandanten på Grini
- Leif Enger as Jacob Vollen
- Thorleif Reiss as Advokaten
- Finn Mehlum as Femtemann
- Per Sunderland as Den navnløse
- Øivind Berne as Tysk vaktsjef
- Knut M. Hansson as Gustav Karlsen
- Arne Christian Magnussen as Den sivile
- Knut Thomassen as NS-politimann
- Roy Bjørnstad as Arne
- Rolf Paulsen as Bernt
- Vilhelm Lund as Ingeniør Hamar
- William Nyrén as Heydner
- Torbjørn Narvestad as Crause
- Einar Rudaa as Drosjesjåføren
