= Bjarne Bø =

Norwegian actor (1907–1998)

- Born: 3 April 1907
- Died: 9 August 1998 (aged 91)

Bjarne Bø (April 3, 1907 – August 9, 1998) was a Norwegian actor.

Bø was born in Skjeberg in the municipality of Sarpsborg in Østfold county, Norway. He debuted in 1939 in the role of Sjur in the play Hu Dagmar by Ove Ansteinsson (1884–1942) at the Bjørnevik Theater. From 1935 to 1939 he acted at the National Theater, mostly playing minor roles. In 1951 he moved to the new People's Theater. This merged with the Oslo New Theater in 1959, and he played the rest of his career there. His most important work was at the Children's Theater, where he wrote, taught, and played in over 1,000 performances together with children. He was a recognized poetry reciter and was often engaged as a reader for NRK radio and television. For generations, he was known as a great storyteller, and especially his narration of the Norwegian folk tale Reve-enka (The Fox's Widow) is remembered by many.

He debuted as a film actor in the role of a strikebreaker in Det drønner gjennom dalen (A Boom through the Valley) in 1938. He appeared in over 20 Norwegian films.

Bø was awarded the King's Medal of Merit in gold for his contribution to Norwegian theater.

== Filmography ==
- Det drønner gjennom dalen (A Boom through the Valley, 1938)
- Ungen (The Child, 1938)
- Gryr i Norden (Dawn in the North, 1939)
- Godvakker-Maren (Good Pretty Maren, 1940)
- Gullfjellet (Gold Mountain, 1941)
- Kjærlighet og vennskap (Love and Friendship, 1941)
- En herre med bart (A Gentleman with a Moustache, 1942)
- Trysil-Knut (Knut from Trysil, 1942)
- Den nye lægen (The New Doctor, 1943)
- Så møtes vi imorgen (So We Meet Tomorrow, 1946)
- Vi vil leve (We Will Live, 1946)
- Svendsen går videre (Svendsen Goes On, 1949)
- To mistenkelige personer (Two Suspects, 1950)
- Alt dette og Island med (All This and Iceland Too, 1951)
- Storfolk og småfolk (Important People and Common People, 1951)
- Skøytekongen (The Skating King, 1953)
- Savnet siden mandag (Missing since Monday, 1955)
- Jakten (The Chasers, 1959)
- Musikanter (The Musicians, 1967)
- Smuglere (The Smugglers, 1968)
- Olsenbanden (The Olsen Gang, 1969)
- Fleksnes fataliteter (The Fleksnes Fatalities, TV): Uncle Knut
