= Lauritz Falk =

Swedish-Norwegian actor and film director

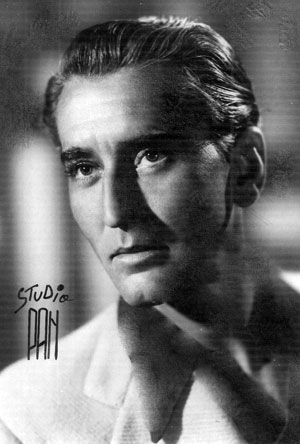
- Born: 15 November 1909; Brussels, Belgium
- Died: 1 February 1990 (aged 80); Stockholm, Sweden
- Occupations: Actor; Film director
- Years active: 1923–1989

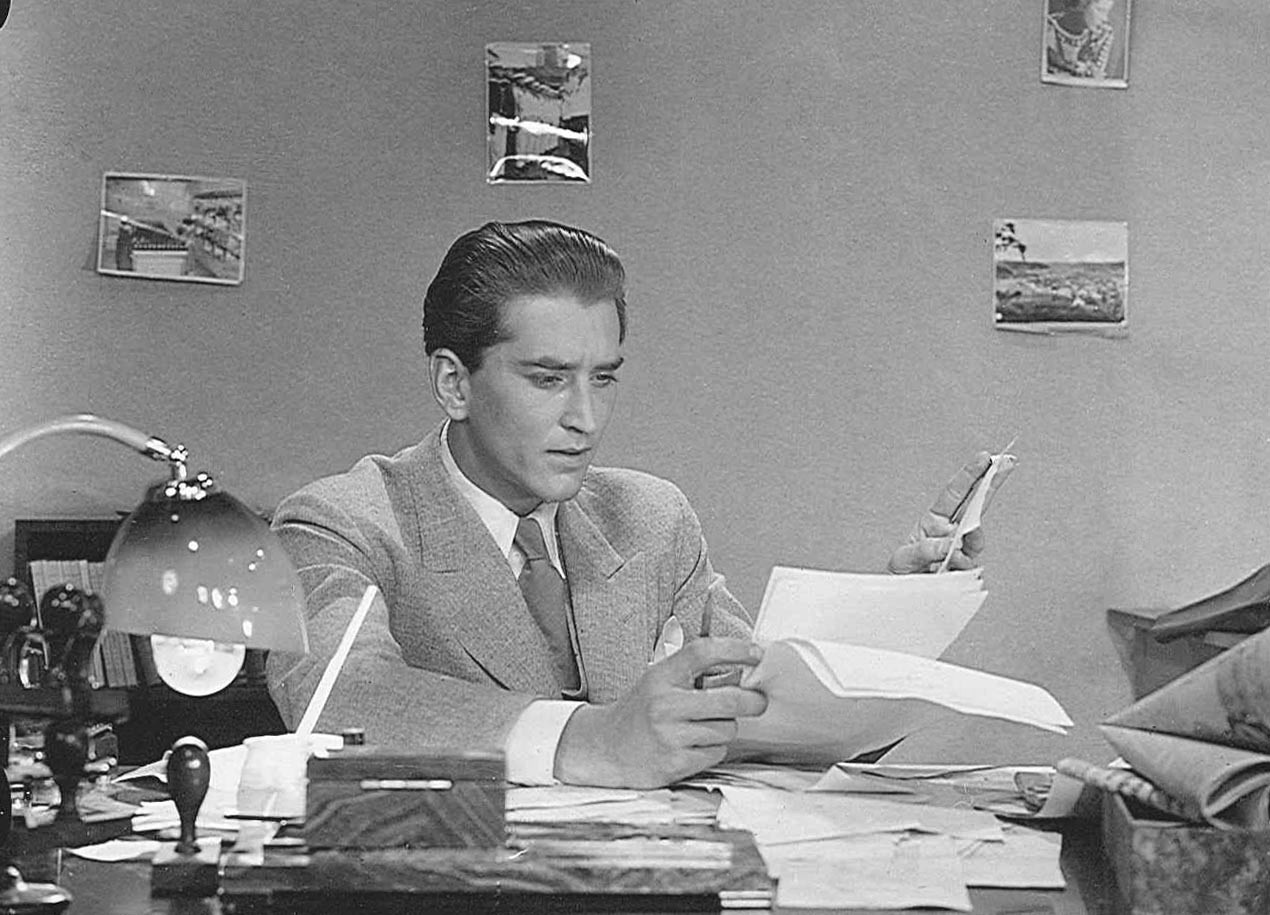
Falk in The Girls at Uppåkra (1936).

Lauritz Falk (15 November 1909 – 1 February 1990) was a Swedish-Norwegian actor, film director, singer and painter. He appeared in about 60 roles in films and TV between 1923 and 1989. He is the cousin of the Swedish artist Bertram Schmiterlöw. He was married to actress Vibeke Mowinckel 1937–1950. From 1955 until his death he was married to the singer Birgit Lennartsson.

== Selected filmography ==
- Norrtullsligan (1923)
- The Girls of Uppakra (1936)
- To levende og en død (1937)
- Gjest Baardsen (1939)
- The Dangerous Game (1942)
- Som du vill ha mej (1943)
- Det brinner en eld (1943)
- There's a Fire Burning (1943)
- Kungajakt (1944)
- The Old Clock at Ronneberga (1944)
- Live Dangerously (1944)
- Oss tjuvar emellan eller En burk ananas (1945)
- How to Love (1947)
- One Swallow Does Not Make a Summer (1947)
- The Key and the Ring (1947)
- The Sixth Commandment (1947)
- Wedding Night (1947)
- Vi flyr på Rio (1949)
- Singoalla (1949)
- Selkvinnen (1953)
- Foreign Intrigue (1956)
- The Koster Waltz (1958)
- Rider in Blue (1959)
- Hans Nielsen Hauge (1961)
- Pärlemor (1961)
- Night Games (1966)
- Lockfågeln (1971)
- Andersson's Kalle on Top Form (1973)
- The Assignment (1977)
- Hedebyborna (1978–82) (TV-series)
- Amorosa (1986)
