= Ivar Svendsen =

Norwegian actor

- Born: November 4, 1929; Norway
- Died: October 9, 2015 (aged 85)
- Resting place: Eastern Cemetery (Østre gravlund), Oslo
- Occupation: Actor

Ivar Svendsen (November 4, 1929 – October 9, 2015) was a Norwegian actor.

== Filmography ==
- 1950: To mistenkelige personer as Gustav
- 1955: Savnet siden mandag as Gunnar Holm
- 1960: Omringet as Per
