= Edith Ottosen =

Norwegian actress (1928–1990)

- Born: June 18, 1928; Levanger, Norway
- Died: January 17, 1990 (aged 61)
- Resting place: Hundvåg, Stavanger
- Occupation: Actress

Edith Charlotte Ottosen (June 18, 1928 – January 17, 1990) was a Norwegian actress.

Ottosen was born in Levanger Municipality, Norway. She grew up in Copenhagen, and in 1951 she debuted at the Aarhus Theater. From 1954 to 1984, she was engaged with the Rogaland Theater, where she was a driving force and played a wide repertoire, including Evelinde in Arne Garborg's Læraren, Elmire in Molière's Tartuffe, Maria in Anton Chekhov's Uncle Vanya, and the locally popular Bertine in Leiv Isaksen's Maktå på Straen.

== Filmography ==
- 1954: Heksenetter as a woman in a nightclub
- 1958: I slik en natt as an informer
- 1974: Kimen as Åshild
