= Vinje (village) =

Village in Vinje Municipality, Norway

Vinje Vinjesvingen
- Village
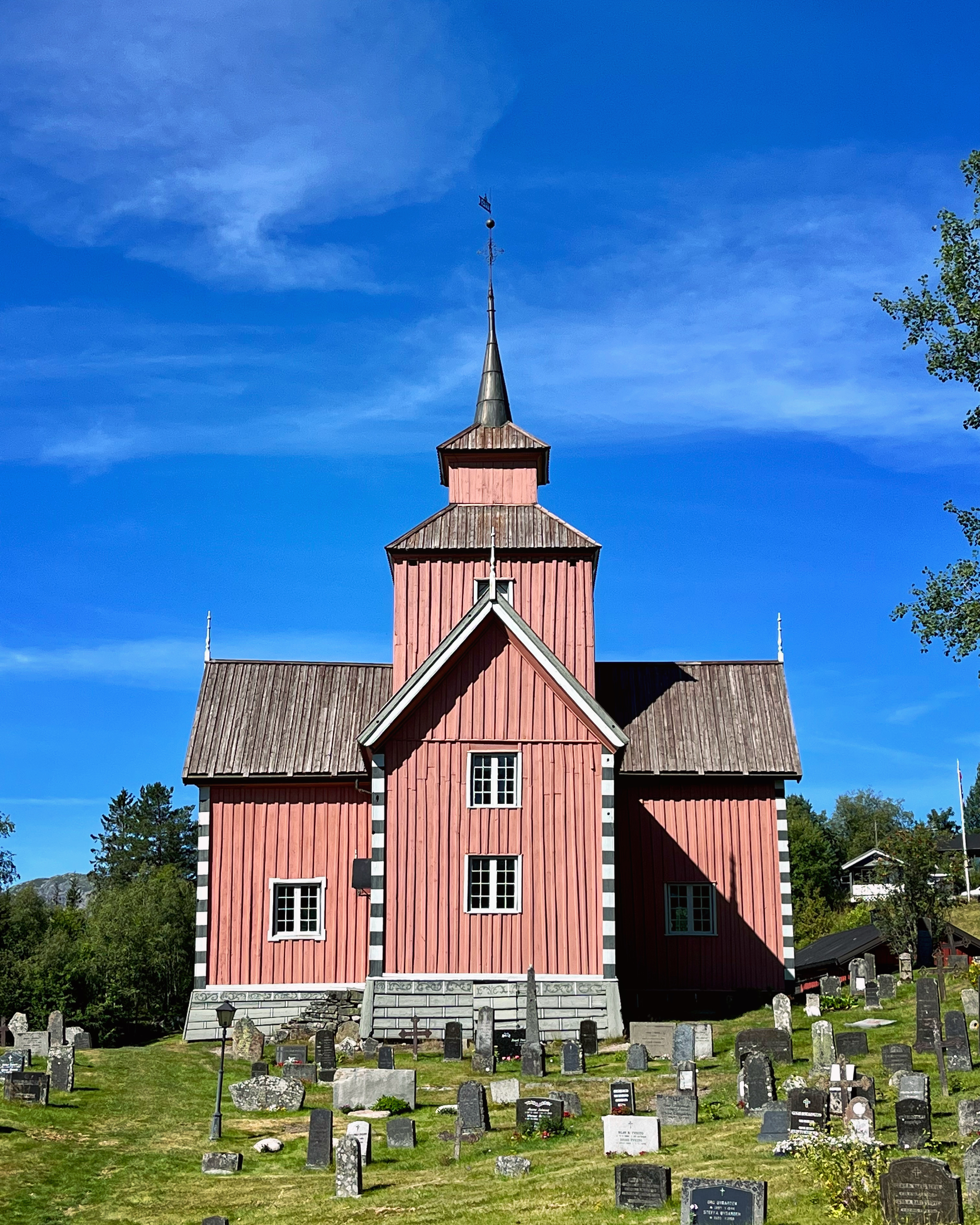
- View of the village church
- Interactive map of Vinje
- Coordinates: 59.61933°N 7.84319°E
- Country: Norway
- Region: Eastern Norway
- County: Telemark
- District: Vest-Telemark
- Municipality: Vinje Municipality
- Elevation: 485 m (1,591 ft)
- Time zone: UTC+01:00 (CET)
  - Summer (DST): UTC+02:00 (CEST)
- Post Code: 3890 Vinje

Vinje is a village in Vinje Municipality in Telemark county, Norway. The village is located near the northwest end of the lake Vinjevatn. The European route E134 highway runs through the village, right past Vinje Church on its way towards the village of Åmot about 10 kilometres (6.2 mi) to the southeast.

Vinjesvingen is the name of a particular area in the northwest part of the village. This is a road fork where the European route E134 highway meets the Norwegian County Road 3408 which goes to Tokke Municipality. The Battle of Vinjesvingen took place at this site during World War II.
