= Bjørn Storberget =

Norwegian writer

- Born: July 5, 1921; Langesund, Norway
- Died: September 29, 1999 (aged 78)
- Occupation: Writer

Bjørn Storberget (July 5, 1921 – September 29, 1999) was a Norwegian writer.

Storberget was born in Langesund. Storberget's career was connected with the Norwegian postal service. He started working for the postal service in 1938, and in 1939 he worked as a student at the Langesund post office. He also performed postal work in Larvik and Kristiansand. He took the postal examination in 1941. In 1942 he was employed as the head postal assistant in Vadsø, and on January 1, 1947, at the post office in Asker.

Storberget took over editing of the magazine POST in 1956 in addition to his usual work in Asker. Alongside his job as an editor, Storberget was also responsible for external information, such as preparing brochures and maintaining contact with the press. Gradually, the information service or editor's office was expanded, and Storberget became involved in the stamp service, among other things.

With the reorganization of the Norwegian Postal Administration in 1974 and 1975, its information and market function was strengthened. A separate information section (TI) was placed under the Traffic Department with Storberget as the head. The section had a separate information office (TII), a sales office (TIS), and a philately office (TIF). Under the philately office were also the Postal Museum and the Postal Library. In 1985, the information office was placed under the marketing department (MMI).

Storberget's interests included journalism, and he wrote short stories that were published in the weekly press and had several books published. He was also a member of the Norwegian Post Organization's district board and an auditor, a member of the civil servant committee, and the treasurer of the vacation home board in the Norwegian Post Organization's Telemark district.

Storberget received the King's Medal of Merit in gold in recognition of his services in 1991.

== Books ==
- 1943: Gutteklubben i kamp
- 1945: Den usynlige fronten
- 1945: Sleipner
- 1946: Hjemløs
- 1948: På farlige eventyr
- 1949: Rømlingene
- 1953: Alle gutters fotballbok (with Kristian Henriksen)
- 1963: Postmannen og postdikteren Knut Hamsun
- 197?: Postens virksomhet i Norge
- 1980: Ord om brevet
- 1990: En tur gjennom Postens historie
- 1994: Postens OL-bok
- 1995: Posten får vinger
- 1997: Mennesker i Posten gjennom 350 år

== Television and film ==
- 1953: Skøytekongen, concept for the film script
- 1955: Frimerket jubilerer, film script
- 1976: Nynytt as himself
