= Stevelin Urdahl =

Norwegian actor (1899–1967)

- Born: September 21, 1899; Kristiania (now Oslo), Norway
- Died: August 14, 1967 (aged 67)
- Occupation: Actor

Stevelin Urdahl (born Stevelin Urdahl Foss, September 21, 1899 – August 14, 1967) was a Norwegian stage and screen actor.

Urdahl was born in Kristiania (now Oslo), Norway. In the 1940s and 1950s, he worked at the New Theater, and in the 1960s at the Oslo New Theater. He was also a screen actor, and he appeared in 13 films and television series between 1946 and 1966. Urdahl made his film debut in Nils R. Müller's Så møtes vi imorgen in 1946.

Urdahl is buried at Vestre Gravlund in Oslo.

== Filmography ==
- 1946: Så møtes vi imorgen as the police commissioner
- 1946: Englandsfarere as Drømmeren
- 1948: Kampen om tungtvannet as a military engineer
- 1949: Gategutter as the police commissioner
- 1952: Det kunne vært deg as the taxi driver
- 1954: Portrettet as Anders
- 1957: På slaget åtte
- 1958: I slik en natt as an SS officer
- 1958: Pastor Jarman kommer hjem as a ship's officer
- 1959: Herren og hans tjenere
- 1961: Hans Nielsen Hauge as the neighbor
- 1964: Klokker i måneskinn as a sailor
- 1966: Broder Gabrielsen as Olsen

== Television ==
- 1966: Lille Lord Fauntleroy as the office clerk
