= Bjørn Woll =

Norwegian musician, conductor and composer (1927–1996)

- Born: May 30, 1927; Oslo, Norway
- Died: February 13, 1996 (aged 68); Stavanger, Norway
- Occupations: Musician, conductor, composer

Bjørn Norman Woll (May 30, 1927 – February 13, 1996) was a Norwegian violinist, conductor, and composer.

== Biography ==
In his youth, Woll studied violin under Leif Halvorsen. As a young man, he was employed by the Oslo Philharmonic Orchestra, where he eventually advanced to the second violin group's concertmaster. For a number of years he shared the first chair with Kaare Sæther, who was also a very active violin teacher. Woll was active as a film composer during the same period, and he wrote the music for several Norwegian films of the time, among which Sønner av Norge (Sons of Norway) and Ugler i mosen (Mischief Afoot) are the best known. As a studio musician, he participated in a number of recordings in which the violin group consisted of Kai Angel Næsteby, Arne Monn-Iversen, Jan Ulf Jacobsen, and himself.

Woll succeeded Karsten Andersen in 1963 as the conductor and artistic director of the Stavanger Symphony Orchestra and as the performing conductor of the Stavanger Ensemble, a chamber ensemble that had morning broadcasts on radio until 1970 (not to be confused with the later rock group of the same name). Woll led the Stavanger Symphony Orchestra until 1989. He was also briefly involved with the Sandnes Orchestra Association toward the end of his career.

Bjørn Woll lived his last years as a pensioner in Stavanger. He was the last of the state-employed Norwegian city orchestra conductors.
