= To mistenkelige personer =

- Directed by: Tancred Ibsen
- Written by: Tancred Ibsen
- Based on: Gunnar Larsen's novel To mistenkelige personer
- Produced by: Sigval Maartmann-Moe
- Starring: Peter Lindgren; Ivar Svendsen; Brita Lech-Hanssenn; Bjarne Andersen; Bjarne Bø; Kari Diesen
- Cinematography: Kåre Bergstrøm
- Edited by: Tancred Ibsen
- Music by: Pauline Hall
- Distributed by: Norenafilm
- Release date: 1950
- Running time: 101 minutes
- Country: Norway
- Language: Norwegian

To mistenkelige personer (Two Suspects) is a Norwegian crime drama from 1950 directed by Tancred Ibsen. The film is about the murder of two sheriffs in Norway and the subsequent hunt for the criminals. The script is based on Gunnar Larsen's 1933 novel of the same name. The novel is loosely based on a real incident that happened in Ådal in 1926. The film was banned from being shown in Norway for reasons of privacy. The verdict was upheld until the end of the 1990s.

== Background ==
The film adaptation of the book is based on the true story of the sheriffs' murders at Vågård, an event that took place at Vågård in Ytre Ådal on August 22, 1926, when two sheriffs from Ringerike tried to arrest two safe blowers and robbers. Both sheriffs were killed, and the double murder triggered a large-scale hunt for the perpetrators.

== About the film ==
To mistenkelige personer holds a special place in Norwegian film history. Already during the filming, one of the two criminals from 1926 contacted the authorities in an attempt to stop the film, which was successful. First in the Oslo City Court and then in the Norwegian Supreme Court, the film was banned from being shown in public. This resulted in a large financial loss for the production company Norsk Film A/S. The verdict against To mistenkelige personer was unparalleled in Europe, and it is central to Norwegian legal life. The right to privacy was set higher than that of freedom of expression.

As recently as 1997, Norsk Film refused to show the film to the Norwegian Editors' Association out of consideration for the descendants of a deceased killer. In March 1998, the film was released in a decision by the board of Norsk Film. Earlier that year, the Norwegian Editors' Association held a mock trial on showing the film. The "judges' panel" of Jon Bing, John Stanghelle, and Anne Lise Ryel concluded that the film should be released. This "judgment" had no real significance, but it was considered important in principle. On November 25, 1998, the film was shown publicly at the Cinematheque in Bergen. It was not until 2003 that Norsk Filmstudio, which had the rights to the film, took up the case again, and two years later Jon Bing reconsidered the ban. Here it was stated that the film could be made available to the public. The main character was no longer alive. The film was shown to the public in 2007, and the same year it was shown on NRK.

== Cast ==
- Peter Lindgren as Ekstrøm
- Ivar Svendsen as Gustav
- Britta Lech-Hanssen as Anna
- Bjarne Andersen as Ekstrøm's father
- Bjarne Bø as the sheriff
- Kari Diesen as the neighbor's wife
- Einar Vaage as a tramp
- Henki Kolstad as a tramp
- Joachim Holst-Jensen
- Edvard Drabløs as a tramp
- Arvid Nilssen as a tramp
- Grace Grung
- Nils Hald
- Sverre Hansen
- Turid Haaland
- Per Kielland
- Gunnar Skar
- Merete Skavlan
- Eugen Skjønberg
