= Battle of Vinjesvingen =

Part of the Norwegian Campaign of World War II (May 1940)

Coordinates: 59°37′13″N 7°48′23″E

- Part of the Norwegian campaign
Date	3–5 May 1940
Location	Vinjesvingen in Telemark, Norway
Result	The forces at Vinjesvingen capitulated May 5 after all other Norwegian forces in southern Norway had laid down their arms.

Belligerents
Norway	Germany

Commanders and leaders
Thor O. Hannevig (POW)	?

Strength
~300 soldiers	?

The Battle of Vinjesvingen was a battle of the Norwegian campaign and took place in May 1940 in the Telemark county, Norway. It became one of the two last strongholds of Norwegian resistance in southern Norway during World War II, the other being Hegra Fortress.

== Background ==
Under the command of Second Lieutenant Thor O. Hannevig, the Norwegians held their position against superior German forces until 5 May 1940. Hannevig managed to sneak great loads of arms, equipment and fuel from depots right in front of the German forces. The equipment was brought to Vinje and Vågsli in Telemark, where Hannevig established a unit which came to be known as Telemark Infantry Regiment. This included Krag–Jørgensen bolt action rifles, Madsen light machine guns, Colt M/29 heavy machine guns, 81 mm (3.19 in) mortars as well as mines and explosives to destroy bridges and roads. The plan was to prevent German advance westward through Telemark and Setesdal, and to support Allied reinforcements from the west.

== Battle ==
A full mobilization was carried out in the area, and at most the force totaled around 300 men, but the number changed constantly. Several small battles were fought, mostly involving Norwegian ambushes on advancing German formations, using small arms and IEDs. The Norwegian defenders often destroyed and/or damaged bridges and roads in the area to delay the German advance.

The main battle took place from 3–5 May. Large German forces were eventually deployed to the area, and the German losses were considerable. When it was realized that the entire south of Norway was lost, and that the Allied Åndalsnes task force would not break through from the west, Hannevig initiated negotiations for surrender. The battles of Vinjesvingen had a great symbolic effect during the occupation, and provided a moral boost to a rather depressing occupation. It was however not known to the rest of the country while the battles were fought.

== See also ==
- List of Norwegian military equipment of World War II
- List of German military equipment of World War II
