= Eugen Skjønberg =

Norwegian actor

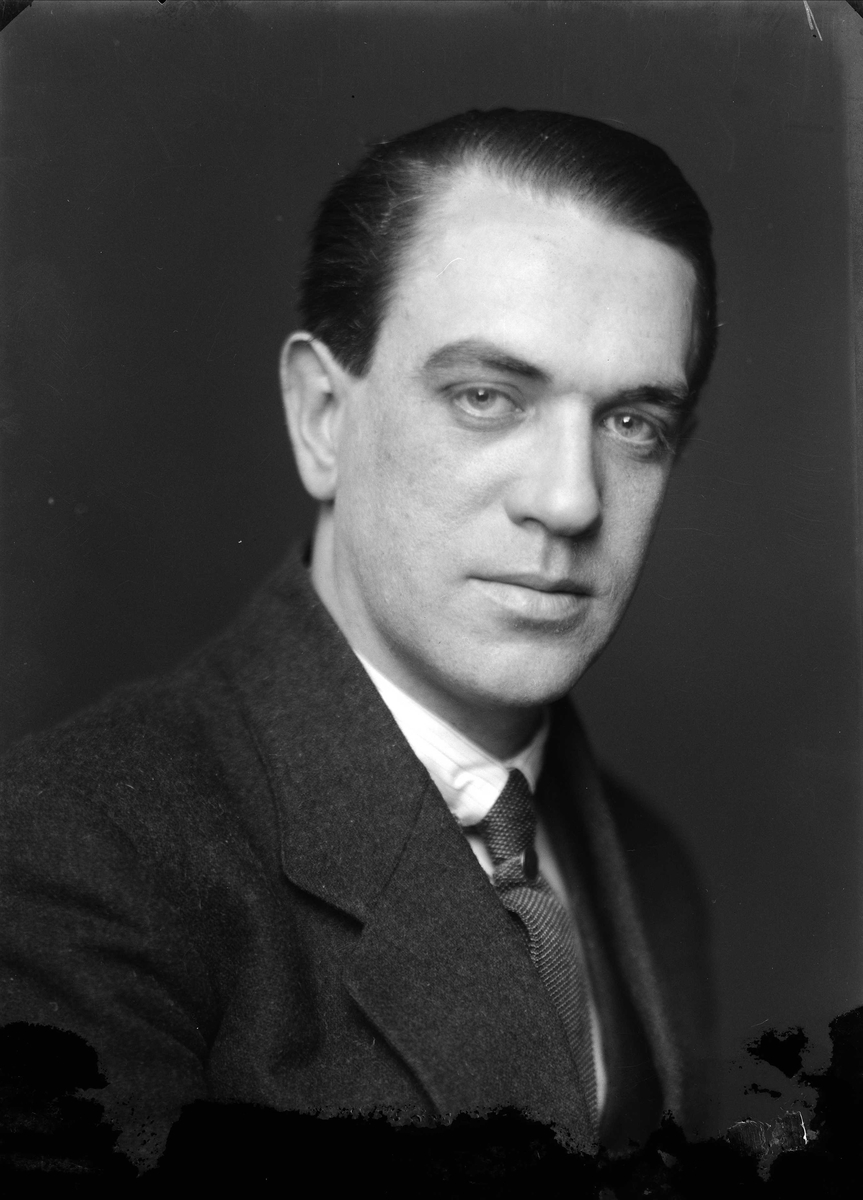
- Born: Conrad Eugen Skjønberg; March 27, 1889; Kragerø, Norway
- Died: July 25, 1971 (aged 82); Oslo, Norway
- Occupation: Actor
- Spouse: Henny Skjønberg
- Children: 3, including Pål and Espen

Conrad Eugen Skjønberg (March 27, 1889 – July 25, 1971) was a Norwegian actor.

Eugen Skjønberg was married to the actress Henny Skjønberg. They resided at Ramstad. He was the father of Per Skjønberg, Pål Skjønberg, and Espen Skjønberg, and the grandfather of Hennika Skjønberg, Siv Skjønberg, and Jo Skjønberg, all of whom were actors and actresses.

Skjønberg started his career in the banking industry in Kragerø and Skien, but in his twenties he was discovered in the amateur theater by a dance teacher, who recommended him to Alma Fahlstrøm in 1913. Fahlstrøm referred him to Sophie Reimers for training, as well as for singing lessons with Maja Flagstad. Then he received a job at the Stavanger Permanent Theater (Stavanger faste scene) with Thora Hansson, and he made his debut as Johan Tønnessen in Henrik Ibsen's The Pillars of Society. He remained there until 1920.

He was then engaged with the National Theater from 1920 to 1924 before he went to Chat Noir to work under Victor Bernau, where he remained until 1929. After this he joined the newly opened Oslo New Theater, where he worked from 1929 to 1962, except for his years at the Trøndelag Theater, from 1937 to 1946.

Skjønberg participated in a number of recordings for NRK's Radio Theater, and among other things can be heard in the series about Dickie Dick Dickens and Ibsen pieces such as The League of Youth.

He was also a sought-after film actor and appeared in nearly 30 films in Norway and Sweden. Among the best known are Fant (1937), the banned film To mistenkelige personer (1950), and Vi gifter oss (1951).

Skjønberg received the King's Medal of Merit in gold in 1959.

== Filmography ==
- 1921: Felix as the doctor
- 1921: Jomfru Trofast as Peder Flotten
- 1923: Iron Wills as Ove Rolandsen
- 1925: Himmeluret as Andresen, a general store operator
- 1927: Den glade enke i Trangvik as Sivert, a sailor
- 1927: Madame besøker Oslo as Albert
- 1932: En glad gutt as Øyvind's father
- 1932: Fantegutten as Christian
- 1932: Prinsessen som ingen kunne målbinde as Per
- 1934: Op med hodet!
- 1936: Morderen uten ansikt as Andresen, a manager
- 1936: Vi vil oss et land... as Kåre Fjell, a bookkeeper
- 1937: Fant as a bailiff
- 1940: Tørres Snørtevold as Koren
- 1948: Trollfossen as the foreign company representative
- 1949: Døden er et kjærtegn as a city court official
- 1949: Svendsen går videre
- 1949: Vi flyger på Rio
- 1950: To mistenkelige personer
- 1951: Vi gifter oss as Mr. Gran
- 1952: Det kunne vært deg as Westberg
- 1953: Selkvinnen as Trondur Våg
- 1953: Skøytekongen as Hellemo, a truck driver
- 1954: Portrettet as a watchman
- 1955: Arthurs forbrytelse as a constable
- 1955: Hjem går vi ikke
- 1955: Savnet siden mandag
- 1955: The Summer Wind Blows as Tönne, the chairman
- 1956: Ektemann alene as Stenersen
- 1956: Kvinnens plass
