= Pål Skjønberg =

Norwegian actor

- Born: 20 October 1919; Stavanger, Norway
- Died: 3 February 2014 (aged 94)
- Occupation: Actor
- Years active: 1946–1991
- Parents: Eugen Skjønberg (father); Henny Skjønberg (mother)
- Relatives: Espen Skjønberg (brother)

Pål Eugen Bucher Skjønberg (20 October 1919 – 3 February 2014) was a Norwegian actor.

He was born in Stavanger to actors Eugen (1889–1971) and Henny Skjønberg (1886–1973). He was the older brother of actor Espen Skjønberg. They grew up in Bærum and Oslo. In 1946 he married actress Elisabeth Bang (1922–2009).

He made his stage debut for Bærum Studiescene during World War II. Both his brother and future wife were involved here too. He was later employed at the theatre Det Norske Teatret from 1945 to his retirement in 1989, except for the years 1951 to 1952 when he worked at Den Nationale Scene. His film debut came in 1946 in the film Englandsfarere. Another notable appearance was the film Ut av mørket, which was entered into the 8th Berlin International Film Festival. He appeared in at least 23 films and television shows between 1946 and 1991. Skjønberg was also a board member of Riksteatret from 1968 to 1976. He has received numerous awards, including the King's Medal of Merit.

He died in February 2014.

== Selected filmography ==
- 1946: Englandsfarere
- 1946: Så møtes vi imorgen
- 1953: Skøytekongen
- 1957: Stevnemøte med glemte år
- 1958: Ut av mørket
- 1966: Hunger
- 1969: Himmel og helvete as Hermansen, a policeman
- 1991: For dagene er onde
