= Mona Hofland =

Norwegian actress (1929–2010)

- Born: 24 November 1929; Oslo, Norway
- Died: 11 February 2010 (aged 80); Oslo, Norway
- Occupation: Actress
- Spouse: Espen Skjønberg (m. 1959)

Mona Hofland (24 November 1929 – 11 February 2010) was a Norwegian theatre and television actress.

== Biography ==
Mona Hofland was born in Oslo, Norway. She studied at the Norwegian National Academy of Craft and Art Industry in Oslo and was a student at Studioteatret from 1949 to 1950. She had her stage debut at Studioteatret in 1949 and then built a reputation as a solid versatile actress. She performed numerous prominent roles, including Lady Macbeth, and the title roles in Hedda Gabler and The Lady of the Camellias. She was also the first Norwegian Eliza Doolittle in a production of My Fair Lady.

She was married to the actor Espen Skjønberg, and the two co-starred in several productions, most notably as husband and wife in the popular soap opera Familiesagaen De syv søstre (1996–2000).
