= Espen Skjønberg =

Norwegian actor (1924–2022)

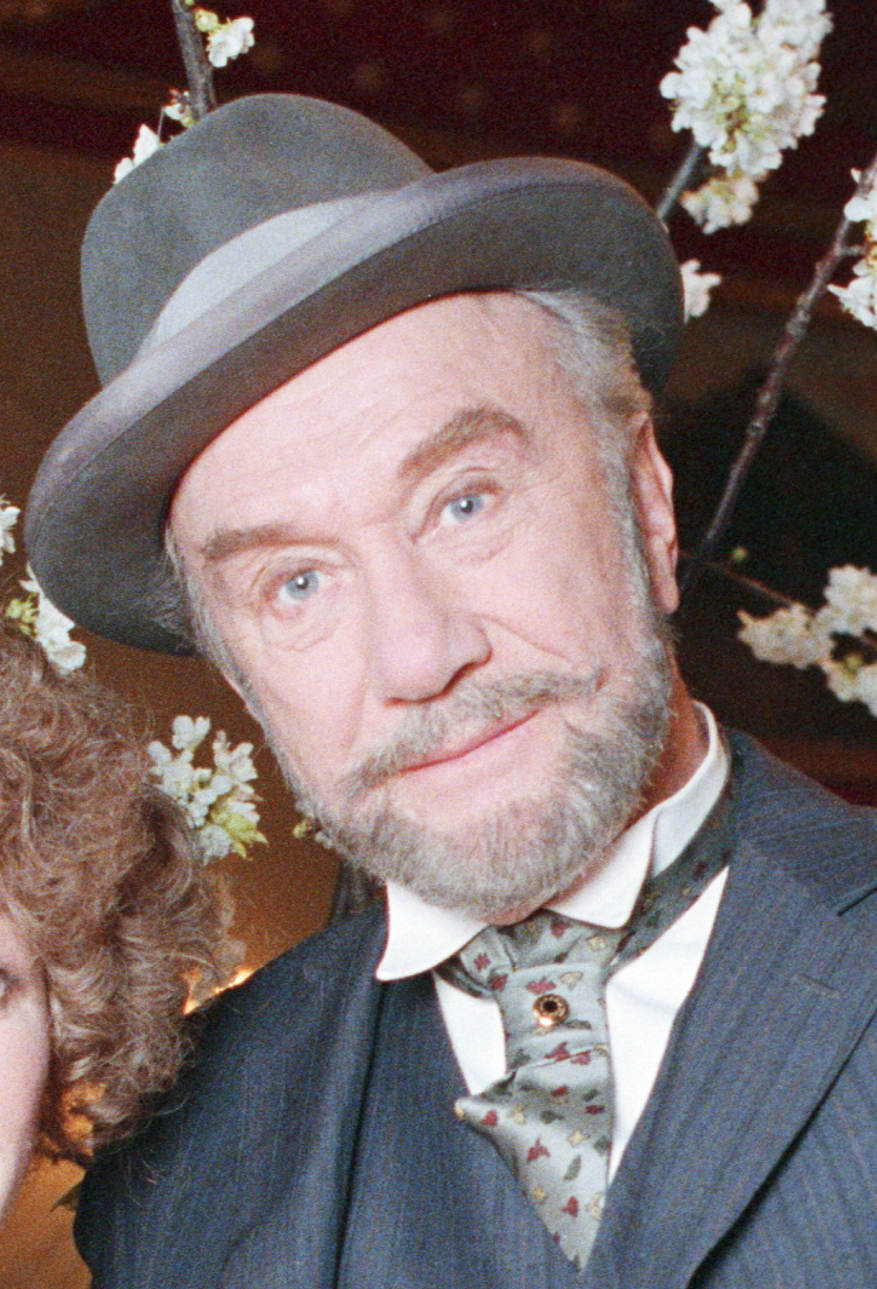
- Skjønberg in 1988
- Born: Espen Skjønberg; 7 April 1924; Oslo, Norway
- Died: 26 August 2022 (aged 98)
- Occupation: Actor
- Years active: 1937–2022
- Spouse: Mona Hofland (m. 1959; died 2010)
- Parents: Eugen Skjønberg (father); Henny Skjønberg (mother)
- Relatives: Pål Skjønberg (brother)

Espen Henrik Skjønberg (7 April 1924 – 26 August 2022) was a Norwegian actor of stage, screen, and television.

== Career ==
Skjønberg made his first movie appearances as a child in the 1932 film En glad gutt and in the 1937 Norwegian classic Fant, in which his mother also appeared. His stage debut came reciting poetry at the Norwegian theatre Chat Noir in 1945. He joined the Norwegian National Theatre in 1946 and became one of its most prominent figures, appearing in 64 different roles in the next 60 years. As late as 2006 he co-starred with Toralv Maurstad (who also appeared in Fant) in an adaptation of Waiting for Godot.

Skjønberg's first starring role in films was in 1951's Vi vil skilles. Throughout the years he has acted alongside Tom Courtenay, Nigel Hawthorne, Susannah York, Edward Woodward, Gérard Depardieu, and co-starred with Hollywood veterans Cliff Robertson and Robert Mitchum in the 1995 movie Pakten. In England, he was particularly associated with the Royal Exchange Theatre in Manchester and appeared there many times.

He also found popularity with new generations heading the cast of Familiesagaen De Syv Søstre (1996–2000), one of Norway's first major soap operas. In the show Skjønberg co-starred with his real-life wife, actress Mona Hofland. He was also popular as the old mountain gnome Erke in the widely successful children's series Jul i Blåfjell (1999).

Skjønberg received several awards throughout his career. Most notably the Norwegian Arts Council's Honorary Award in 1989, the Norwegian film award Amanda for best actor in 1994 (for the World War II drama The Last Lieutenant) and its Honorary Award in 2004. In 2008 he also won an Amanda for his supporting role in the movie O' Horten. He has also received the British Theatre Association's Drama Award and was made a Knight, First Class of the Royal Norwegian Order of St Olav by the King of Norway.

== Personal life and death ==
Skjønberg was born in Oslo on 7 April 1924, to actress Henny Skjønberg and actor Eugen Skjønberg. His older brother, Pål Skjønberg, was also a successful actor and stage instructor. He was married to actress Mona Hofland from 1959 until her death in 2010.

Skjønberg died on 26 August 2022, at the age of 98.

== Filmography ==
=== Film ===
Year	Film	Role	Notes
1937	Fant	Fantebarn #2	
1939	De vergeløse	Schoolboy	
1951	Dei svarte hestane	Ola Nordbø	
1951	The Stranger	Bokselgeren	
1952	Vi vil skilles	Ola Berg	
1952	Andrine og Kjell		
1953	Ung frue forsvunnet	Einar Møller, pharmacist	
1953	Skøytekongen	Høye, journalist	
1954	Kasserer Jensen	Svensen	
1954	Portrettet	Nilsen, pharmacist	
1955	Arthurs forbrytelse	Arthur Sellman	
1956	Roser til Monica	Egil Ek, pianist	
1957	Stevnemøte med glemte år		
1961	Hans Nielsen Hauge	Mikkel Nielsen Hauge	
1970	One Day in the Life of Ivan Denisovich	Tiurin	
1971	Gråt elskede mann		
1972	Motforestilling		
1973	Knut Formos siste jakt	Presten	
1976	Vårnatt	Hjalmar	
1979	Blood of the Railroad Workers	Spelol	
1979	Heritage	Jon Skaug	
1981	The Witch Hunt	Kristoffer Klomber	
1982	Krypskyttere	Tandberg	
1984	On the Threshold	Kalle	
1989	A Handful of Time	Old Martin	
1990	Twice Upon a Time	Smykkehandleren	
1990	Wayfarers	Knoff	
1990	Svampe	Trym	
1991	The Polar Bear King	Fortelleren	voice
1993	The Last Lieutenant	Thor Espedal	Amanda for Best Actor
1994	Dreamplay	Faren	
1994	Trollsyn	Fortelleren	voice
1995	Waiting for Sunset	Carl Berner	
1996	Syndig sommer		
1999	Sofies verden	Leonardo da Vinci	
1999	Frozen Heart	Nansen	voice
2001	Guggen: The Big Cheese		voice
2002	I Am Dina	Merchant 2	
2004	My Jealous Barber	Bents father	
2007	O' Horten	Trygve Sissener	Amanda for Best Supporting Actor
2008	Fiin aargang		
2008	I et speil i en gåte	Grandfather	

=== Television ===
Year	Programme or series	Role	Notes
1962	Prosessen	Josef K	
1969	Faderen	Captain	
1969	Taxi		TV mini-series
1970	Vildanden	Gregers Werle	
1981	Medmenneske	Didrik Dale	TV mini-series
1985	Kong Lear		TV mini-series
1988	Codename: Kyril	Michaelov	
1994	Vestavind	Algot Engan	
1994	Seier'n er vå	Bestefar	
1996	Familiesagaen de syv søstre	Haakon	(unknown episodes)
1999	Jul i Blåfjell	Erke	
2000	Sofies verden	Leonardi Da Vinci	TV mini-series
2004–2005	Seks som oss	Prest	3 episodes
2007	Berlinerpoplene	Tormod Neshov	TV mini-series
2009	Casper och den förbjudna filmen	Himself	

== Selected theatre performances ==
- Ulrik Brendel in Rosmersholm by Henrik Ibsen. Directed by Casper Wrede at the Royal Exchange, Manchester. (1981)
- Odysseus in Philoctetes by Sophocles. Directed by Michael Elliott at the Royal Exchange, Manchester. (1982)
- Old Ekdal in The Wild Duck by Henrik Ibsen. Directed by Casper Wrede at the Royal Exchange, Manchester. (1983)
- Dr Chebutykin in Three Sisters by Anton Chekhov. Directed by Casper Wrede at the Royal Exchange, Manchester. (1985)
- Shylock in The Merchant of Venice. Directed by Braham Murray at the Royal Exchange, Manchester. (1987)
- Theseus in Oedipus by Sophocles. Directed by Casper Wrede at the Royal Exchange, Manchester. (1987)
- Button Moulder in Peer Gynt by Henrik Ibsen. Directed by Braham Murray at the Royal Exchange, Manchester. (1999)
- Firs in The Cherry Orchard by Anton Chekhov. Staged at the Nationaltheatret, Oslo. (2017)

Awards
Preceded by Arne Skouen	Recipient of the Norsk kulturråds ærespris 1989	Succeeded by Arne Nordheim
