= Henny Skjønberg =

Norwegian actress and stage director

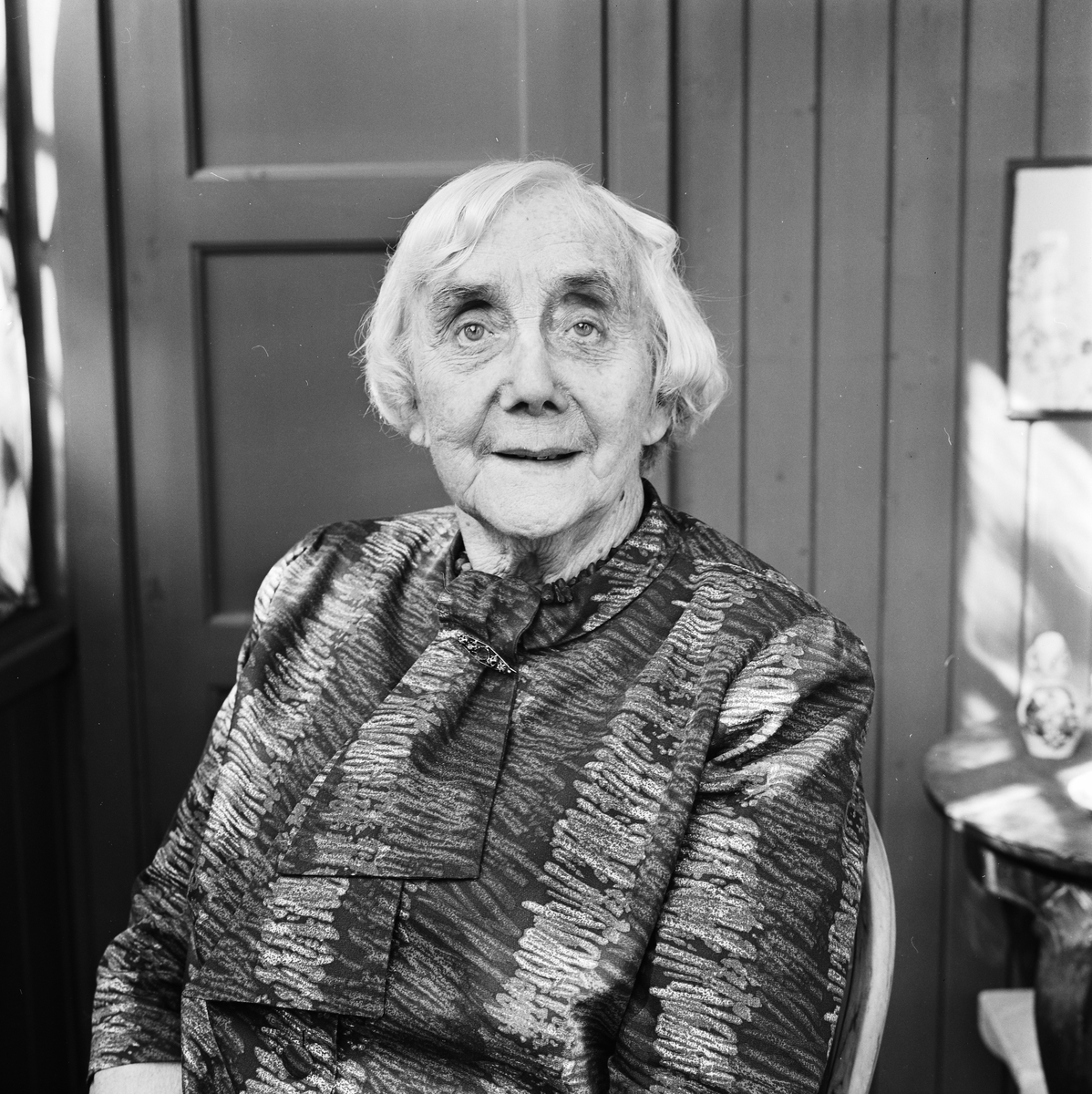
- Born: 6 August 1886
- Died: 5 January 1973 (aged 86)

Henny Kristin Skjønberg (6 August 1886 – 5 January 1973) was a Norwegian actress and stage director.

== Biography ==
Hennika Bucher Eide was born in Stavanger, Norway. She was the daughter of Henrik Eide and Ingeborg Sofie Bucher. She attended upper secondary school at Kongsgård in Stavanger, after which she traveled to London.

She made her debut at the newly established Stavanger Faste Scene (later Rogaland Teater) in 1914. She was mainly employed at the Norwegian Theater in Oslo, where with humour and irony she specialized as a character comedian. She also acted in movies from 1920 to 1967. Skjønberg's most famous role came as the cranky old aunt Tante Pose in the 1940 movie of the same name. For years it has been a staple of Christmas entertainment, shown on Norwegian television every December.

Skjønberg also wrote several stage-comedies for children performed at the Norwegian Theater and was an active instructor, mainly for children's plays. She received the Hulda Garborg stipend in 1934 and the Norwegian Dramatic Association's honorary medal (Norsk Dramatikerforbunds æresmedalje) in 1953.

== Personal life ==
She was married to actor Eugen Skjønberg and was the mother of leading Norwegian actors Pål Skjønberg and Espen Henrik Skjønberg. She was the grandmother of actors Hennika Skjønberg, Siv Skjønberg, and Jo Skjønberg.
