= Operasjon Løvsprett =

- Directed by: Knut Andersen
- Written by: Bias Bernhoft; Rolf Sand
- Produced by: Knut Bohwim
- Starring: Rolf Just Nilsen; Arve Opsahl; Odd Borg; Sølvi Wang; Tore Foss; Erik Lassen; Sverre Holm; Unni Bernhoft; Arne Bendiksen; Anita Thallaug; Rolf Sand; Egil Hjorth Jensen; Per Asplin; Synnøve Strigen; Kari Sundby; Elisabeth Granneman; Leif Enger; Kari Diesen; Carsten Byhring; Arvid Nilssen; Ulf Wengård; Per Lekang; Oddvar Sanne; Gustav Adolf Hegh; Grynet Molvig; Berit Kullander; Ray Adams; Torgils Moe
- Cinematography: Mattis Mathiesen
- Music by: Egil Monn-Iversen
- Distributed by: Norenafilm
- Release date: 1962
- Running time: 86 minutes
- Country: Norway
- Language: Norwegian

Operasjon Løvsprett (Operation Leafing) is a Norwegian military comedy from 1962. It mostly takes place at the Lahaugmoen military base. A funny script, familiar situations, and good actors in all of the roles made the film a great success. The film also had a sequel in 1964 called Operasjon Sjøsprøyt (Operation Sea Spray). The film was released on DVD on February 11, 2004.

== Plot ==
A number of very different men are called in for three weeks of training exercise at the Haglemoen military base, one just as odd as the next. They include the jolly salesman Goggen Rask (Rolf Just Nilsen), the car repairman Bottolph Johansen (Arve Opsahl), who is nicknamed Dreamer, and the shipowner Rieber-Larsen Jr. (Odd Borg). An unruly gang with characters like Major Kampstrup (Tore Foss) has a hard time keeping order—and keeping them—in the camp as they get sick and are taken care of by nurses Bitten (Anita Thallaug) and Florence (Sølvi Wang). The men do their best and make it through the big field maneuver after countless complications and comic situations.

== Songs ==
- "Brother Bill" (by Tony Hatch and Per Gunnar Jensen), performed by Ray Adams
