= Nydelige nelliker =

- Directed by: Knut Andersen
- Written by: Bjørn Bergh-Pedersen
- Based on: Egil Lian's novel Drevne karer og viltre jenter på strøket
- Produced by: Knut Bohwim
- Starring: Arve Opsahl; Odd Borg; Erik Lassen
- Cinematography: Mattis Mathiesen
- Edited by: Knut Andersen, Knut Bohwim
- Music by: Egil Monn-Iversen
- Distributed by: Teamfilm
- Release date: 1964
- Running time: 84 minutes
- Country: Norway
- Language: Norwegian

Nydelige nelliker (The Misfits) is a Norwegian comedy film from 1964, directed by Knut Andersen. The screenplay was written by Bjørn Bergh-Pedersen, who based it on Egil Lian's novel Drevne karer og viltre jenter på strøket (Shrewd Guys and Wild Girls in the Neighborhood). Knut Andersen and Knut Bohwim edited the shooting script.

== Plot ==
Lerka and his two sidekicks Slegga and Proffen have been convicted of cheating people out of money and housing fraud. When they are released from prison after six months, they realize that it is not easy to get work after "graduating" from the Oslo Penitentiary. Society does its part to undermine the good intentions of the "misfits," including Dråpan, who has stopped drinking and has been given a painting job by Colonel Ruud and his wife. His thirst—and a thoughtlessly poured glass of liqueur—are enough to drive him off the wagon. Nelly—who is working the Oslo City Hall neighborhood—gets the upper hand over Harald Drangeid. With the help of the money in his well-stocked wallet, Lerka realizes his dream of buying a boat. Lerka's girlfriend Maja is hauled off to jail at the same time as her boyfriend is released.

== Cast ==
- Arve Opsahl as Slegga
- Odd Borg as Lerka
- Erik Lassen as Proffen
- Arvid Nilssen as Dråpan
- Ingerid Vardund as Nelly
- Vigdis Røising as Maja
- Kari Simonsen as Lizzie
- Willie Hoel as Gjermund Sillejord
- Siri Rom as Mrs. Thorvaldsen
- Tore Foss as Colonel Ruud
- Else Heiberg as Mrs. Ruud
- Henki Kolstad as Harald Drangeid
- Torgils Moe as Store-Jens
- Ove Kant as Per Albertson
- Carsten Byhring as the boat salesman
- Leif Enger as the hairdresser
- Aud Schønemann as the hairdresser's fiancé
- Sverre Holm as Harry
- Hans Stormoen as the sales manager
- Rolf Søder as Lieutenant Sem
- Per Hagerup as Lieutenant Viker
- Dagmar Myhrvold as Maja's friend
- Sigrun Otto as the milk lady
- Per Gjersøe as the district court judge
- Erling Lindahl as the actor
- Ola Isene as the trial judge
- Lars Nordrum as the narrator
- Per Skift
