= Odd Borg =

Norwegian actor

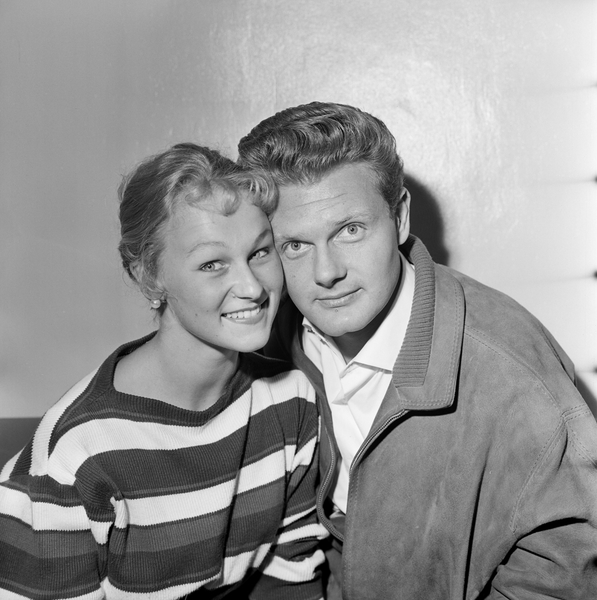
- Odd Borg with his wife Anne in 1959
- Born: May 26, 1931; Oslo, Norway
- Died: November 13, 1965 (aged 34); Oslo, Norway
- Resting place: Western Cemetery, Oslo, Norway
- Occupation: Actor
- Spouse: Anne Borg (1957-1965, divorced)

Odd Carl Arthur Borg (May 26, 1931 – November 13, 1965) was a Norwegian actor. Initially a dramatic actor in theater, he later became one of the most popular comedic actors in Norway in the 1950s and 1960s, best known for his leading straight man characters who often became the unintentional comedic foil in everyday situations.

Borg died by suicide on November 13, 1965, aged 34.

== Career ==
Borg debuted in 1953, playing Vincent in a production of Dear Ruth at the Central Theater in Oslo, showcasing his dramatic capabilities. He soon became a popular staple at the theater, where he performed from 1953 to 1959, playing both dramatic and comedic roles, often the leading men or supporting straight men, but in his own words preferred the dramatic roles that gave him a chance to play interesting characters with deeper stories. After the closure of the Central Theater in 1959, Borg continued performing at the nearby National Theater, which took over most of its productions and actors, where he was given a permanent engagement that lasted from 1959 until his death. During this period he worked closely with both Henki Kolstad and Ingerid Vardund, and she later described him as one of the finest theater actors in Norway. While engaged at the National Theater, Borg alternated between theater productions and films because his on-screen career took over more of his time.

After seeing him in a theater performance in 1955, the director Edith Carlmar offered Borg one of the roles in Bedre enn sitt rykte, a coming-of-age comedy film that featured many young and unknown actors at the time, including Unni Bernhoft and Borg's cousin Knut Bohwim. Although the film itself failed to become a hit, it became the springboard for Borg as a film actor, giving him the lead role in several films in the coming years, including the dramatic lead in Gylne ungdom (1956), often regarded as the Norwegian equivalent of Rebel Without a Cause (1955). As was common for many other popular actors at the time, Borg had a brief foray into music, recording the song "Jeg plystrer hvor jeg går" (I Whistle Where I Walk) in 1957, which sold moderately well in Norway. He also took part in musical numbers for several of the films he played in.

Borgs breakthrough came soon after with a string of hit comedies; Støv på hjernen (1959), Sønner av Norge (1961), and most famously Operasjon Løvsprett (1962). The first two films saw Borg establish his typical straight man character who served as the unintentional comedic foil in relatable everyday situations, while the latter film, which also reunited him with Knut Bohwim, saw Borg portray the pretentious shipping millionaire Riiber-Larsen Jr., again serving as the comedic foil. The films were all record-breaking at the time of their releases, with Operasjon Løvsprett remaining the second most seen film in cinemas in Norwegian history (behind Flåklypa Grand Prix).

Borg, somewhat unwillingly, continued playing these types of characters for the rest of his career; comedic foils drawing large crowds, unbeknown to whom the fact that the comedic roles Borg was loved for were causing him deep distress. Wanting to establish himself as a primarily dramatic actor, he felt he was no longer taken seriously because of his comedic roles, but he continued playing comedies nonetheless, something his then-wife Anne Borg later attributed to his "chronic and obsessive need to please others" and fear of rejection. After spending most of 1962 and 1963 doing theater work, Borg had leading roles in two major films in 1964 and one in 1965. To på topp (1965) was his final leading role, in which he starred alongside Rolf Just Nilsen and Inger Marie Andersen, both of whom he had also performed with in the theater and films multiple times. The film came out on August 30, 1965, ten weeks before his death. His final on-screen appearance was a smaller role as a teacher in Stompa forelsker seg (1965), released on November 7, 1965, less than a week before his death.

On November 13, 1965, Borg performed in the premiere of the comedy play Hva skal vi gjøre? at the National Theater, in what was his final performance. In her memoir released nearly four decades later, his former wife Anne Borg recalled that he had called her just before the premiere, reluctant to take part in the play, calling it "blasphemous and disgusting" and expressing his desire to withdraw from the production. Borg relented, however, after she asked him to consider the other actors and directors, many of whom were their close friends.

== Personal life and death ==
Borg was the cousin of the actor and director Knut Bohwim, whom he also worked with frequently.

Borg met the dancer Anne Nicolaisen in 1956, and they married in August 1957. Their first and only child, Jannicke, was born in 1958. Although the marriage was initially happy, Borg's personal problems eventually caused a rift, leading to their divorce in 1965. Borg remarried shortly before his death.

Despite his on-stage charisma, outgoing personality, and humorous presentation, Borg struggled heavily with his mental and physical health, especially in the later part of his career. He suffered from anxiety and was "extremely introverted and obsessive," often spending entire days alone in his room reading or obsessing over news items, scripts, or finances. In her 2001 memoir, Anne Borg revealed that his popular comedic roles, especially his performance in Sønner av Norge, had caused him great personal grief because he felt he was no longer taken seriously as an actor, contributing to his anxiety, self-esteem issues and growing depression, all of which was kept secret from the public. In 1964, Borg was hospitalized with bleeding stomach ulcers, partially caused by his hectic work schedule and stress, requiring surgery and blood transfusion. The illness and press coverage of his hospitalization, combined with his pre-existing health issues, worsened his distress and isolation, eventually leading to his divorce the following year.

On November 13, 1965, just a few hours after his final play premiered, Borg was found dead behind the Amphitheater Stage at the National Theater, having committed suicide by hanging. He was found by his fellow actor Alfred Maurstad, who became worried when he failed to show up at the afterparty. Borg's sudden death was met with shock and an outpouring of grief because his mental health struggles and physical ailments had been unknown to the public. Because suicide was still a very taboo subject in Norway, the events surrounding his death was not widely reported, with some news outlets even falsely attributing his death to a heart attack and one paper reporting that he died at his home. His death happened late in the evening on a Saturday, and so some papers ran reviews of the play with no mention of his death because the news broke after the papers had been sent to the presses.

Borg was buried at Vestre gravlund in Oslo on November 18, 1965, with the actors Frank Robert, Henki Kolstad, and Knut Bohwim among the pallbearers. At the time of his death and funeral, his two final films were still playing in cinemas.

== Filmography ==
- 1955: Bedre enn sitt rykte
- 1956: Kvinnens plass
- 1956: Gylne ungdom
- 1956: Ektemann alene
- 1957: Peter van Heeren
- 1957: Selv om de er små
- 1959: 5 loddrett
- 1959: Støv på hjernen
- 1961: Line
- 1961: Sønner av Norge
- 1962: Operasjon løvsprett
- 1964: Operasjon sjøsprøyt
- 1964: Nydelige nelliker
- 1965: To på topp
- 1965: Stompa forelsker seg
