= Sønner av Norge (film) =

- Directed by: Øyvind Vennerød
- Written by: Jørn Ording; Øyvind Vennerød
- Produced by: Anne Vennerød
- Starring: Inger Marie Andersen; Odd Borg; Ingerid Vardund; Turid Balke; Arne Bang-Hansen; Willie Hoel
- Cinematography: Sverre Bergli (interior scenes); Ragnar Sørensen (outdoor scenes)
- Edited by: Øyvind Vennerød
- Music by: Bjørn Woll
- Distributed by: Contact Film A/S
- Release date: August 28, 1961
- Running time: 90 minutes
- Country: Norway
- Language: Norwegian

Sønner av Norge (Sons of Norway) is a Norwegian comedy film from 1961 directed by Øyvind Vennerød. The script was written by Jørn Ording and Vennerød. Among others, Inger Marie Andersen, Odd Borg, Turid Balke, Arne Bang-Hansen, and Willie Hoel appear in the roles of the residents of Solbråten. The film was followed by the sequel Sønner av Norge kjøper bil.

== Plot ==
In Solbråten, the men are so busy with the residents' association, community work, and the Norwegian Home Guard that they hardly have time to eat before they take a nap in the middle of the day. The fact that they also have to show up at work does not make life any easier. The acting dispatcher at the Solbråten post office, Gunnar Sørensen, is chairman of the main committee. He is assisted by the tax appraisal secretary Baltzersen (who has a telephone) and the master butcher Anton Andersen. The latter is also chairman of the name committee for Solbråtendagen, while Baltzersen is chairman of the entertainment, awards, and ribbon committee. Gunnar Sørensen is also quite interested in the "weaker sex." His wife Randi does not accept this. She allies herself with her school friend Eva Wikdahl, Solbråten's new dentist. Under Randi's determined leadership, the dentist sets her sights on Mr. Sørensen.

== Cast ==
- Inger Marie Andersen as Gunnar's wife
- Odd Borg as Gunnar Sørensen, the postal dispatcher
- Ingerid Vardund as Eva Wikdahl, the dentist
- Turid Balke as Mrs. Baltzersen
- Arne Bang-Hansen as Baltzersen, the tax appraisal secretary
- Willie Hoel as Anton Andersen, the butcher
- Ingvald Bredangen as Gunnar's doctor
- Wilfred Breistrand as the client at the tax appraisal office
- Ellen Bugge as Baltzersen's secretary
- Aagot Børseth as a customer at the post office
- Lalla Carlsen as Gunnar Sørensen's mother
- Kari Diesen as Alfhild Andersen, the butcher's wife
- Tore Foss as Urias Ulm, a customer at the post office
- Elisabeth Granneman as the screaming woman
- Gustav Adolf Hegh
- Egil Hjorth-Jenssen as Setermoen, the editor of the newspaper Solbråten tidende
- Knut Hultgren as a member of the Norwegian Home Guard
- Ole Langerud as Michelsen on the committee
- Britta Lech-Hanssen
- Erling Lindahl as the Nynorsk proponent at the newspaper editorial office
- Grynet Molvig as Ingrid Mollbakken, an employee at the post officer
- Arvid Nilssen as a car owner in Solbråten
- Randi Nordby as Mrs. Jørgensen
- Arve Opsahl as Evensen, the caretaker
- Knut Risan as a former subscriber with impermissible language
- Rolf Sand as Berg, a hairdresser
- Ragnar Schreiner
- Aud Schønemann as a resident of Solbråten
- Liv Uchermann Selmer
- Arne Torvik as a member of the Norwegian Home Guard
- Annema Trosdahl
- Arild Trønnes as a man in line at the tax appraisal office
