= Lalla Carlsen =

Norwegian singer and actress (1889–1967)

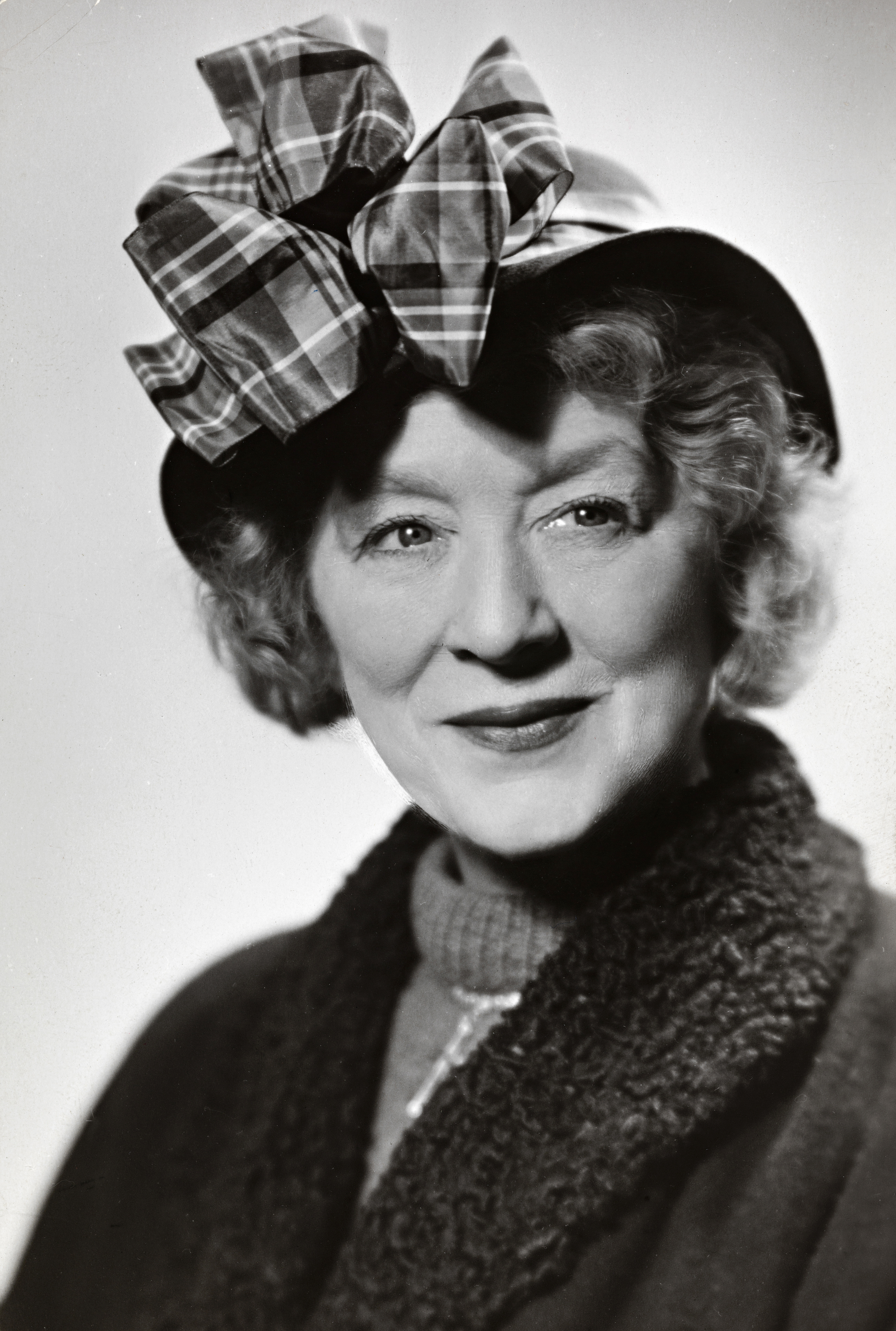
- Lalla Carlsen
- Born: Haralda Petrea Christensen; 17 August 1889; Svelvik, Norway
- Died: 23 March 1967 (aged 77); Oslo, Norway
- Resting place: Oslo Western Civil Cemetery
- Occupations: Singer and actress
- Years active: 1914–1965
- Spouse: Carsten Carlsen (m. 1917–1961)
- Children: 2

Lalla Carlsen (née Haralda Petrea Christensen) (17 August 1889 – 23 March 1967) was a Norwegian singer and actress. She was a very popular singer in Norway.

== Personal life ==
Lalla Carlsen was born in Svelvik as the daughter of shipmaster Carl Alfred Christensen and Laura Nilsson. The family moved to Christiania (now Oslo) when she was ten years old. She married composer, pianist and kapellmeister Carsten Carlsen (1892 –1961) in 1917 and was known by the stage name Lalla Carlsen.

Their daughter Gjertrud Carlsen (1919–2007) was also a pianist on Chat Noir, wrote several children's songs and was the mother of NRK media personality Vibeke Sæther (born 1943). Their son Arne-Carsten Carlsen (born 1922) became an author, journalist and editor at Aftenposten.

== Career ==
Carlsen studied at the Oslo Conservatory of Music from 1909 to 1913, as a soprano singer. She made her professional debut in the musical comedy Høstmanøver in 1914. She performed at the cabaret Chat Noir from 1915 to 1947, and also appeared at the revue stages Casino and the Carl Johan Theater. Her husband Carsten Carlsen was kapellmeister at Chat Noir, and her regular accompanist.

Her breakthrough performance came with Per Kvist's song "Å blei d'a dei (din blei)?" from the 1925 revue Summetonen.

Her film début was in the silent film Den glade enke i Trangvik from 1927, and she starred as the singer in the film Lalla vinner from 1932. Between 1928 and 1931 she recorded about forty songs and sketches. During the Second World War Carlsen performed at the Carl Johan Theater, and her husband composed melodies for several of her songs. Her introduction of Finn Bø and Arild Feldborg's song Norge i rødt, hvitt og blått in 1945 was met with wild enthusiasm. After the war she played minor character roles in twenty films, between 1947 and 1965, such as in I slik en natt from 1958, and in the 1961 film Bussen by Arne Skouen. She performed for radio, television, at the revue theatres Edderkoppen and Chat Noir, and at traditional theatres. She acted in O'Neill's Skjønne ungdom at Rogaland Teater, played the character "Mrs. Peachum" in an adaptation of Brecht/Kurt Weill's musical The Threepenny Opera at Riksteatret, the character "Aase" in Ibsen's verse drama Peer Gynt, and played in O'Neill's drama Anna Christie.

Carlsen died in Oslo on 23 March 1967.

== Legacy ==
Lalla Carlsen was awarded the King's Medal of Merit in gold in 1949. She became an honorary member of the Norwegian Actors' Equity Association in 1958. She was honoured with a statue at her birthplace Svelvik in 1989, sculptured by Per Palle Storm. The street Lallakroken at Briskeby in Oslo, where she lived from 1930, is named in her honour.

The biography Lalla og hennes verden (Oslo: Gyldendal Forlag. 1989) was written by her son Arne-Carsten Carlsen.

== Filmography ==
- Den glade enke i Trangvik (1927), as "Bergtora"
- Lalla vinner! (1932), as "Lalla Hansen"
- Op med hodet! (1934), as "actress"
- Sankt Hans fest (1947), as "Madam Blomgreen"
- Ukjent mann (1951), as old lady
- Ung frue forsvunnet (1953), as the maid
- Brudebuketten (1953), as "Berthe"
- Blodveien (1955), as "Ane"
- Bedre enn sitt rykte (1955), as "Miss Hansen"
- Kvinnens plass (1956), as "boardinghouse hostess"
- På solsiden (1956), as "boatwoman"
- I slik en natt (1958), as "Maren"
- Høysommer (1958), as "Oline"
- Hete septemberdager (1959), as "Lindby's sister"
- Støv på hjernen (1959), as "Mrs. Svenkerud"
- Millionær for en aften (1960), as owner of Maison Stellas
- Sønner av Norge (1961)
- Bussen (1961), as "Klara Tallerud"
- Tonny (1962), as newspapercarrier
- Freske fraspark (1963)
- Alle tiders kupp (1964), as aunt "Sara"
- Hjelp - vi får leilighet! (1965)
- To på topp (1965), as "Josephine Hansen"
