= Klokker i måneskinn =

- Directed by: Kåre Bergstrøm
- Written by: André Bjerke
- Based on: André Bjerke's book Enhjørningen
- Starring: Henny Moan; Lars Nordrum; Frank Robert; Rolf Søder; Hans Stormoen
- Cinematography: Hans Nord
- Edited by: Bjørn Breigutu
- Music by: Gunnar Sønstevold
- Distributed by: Kommunenes filmcentral
- Release date: September 21, 1964
- Running time: 92 minutes
- Country: Norway
- Language: Norwegian

Klokker i måneskinn (Bells in the Moonlight) is a Norwegian anthology film from 1964 directed by Kåre Bergstrøm. The film is about four men that meet for an evening of bridge. Three of them relate accounts of supernatural events they have encountered, while the fourth is skeptical of their stories. The main roles are played by Lars Nordrum, Frank Robert, Rolf Søder, and Hans Stormoen. The film is based on the 1963 André Bjerke novel Enhjørningen. Bjerke also wrote the screenplay.

== Plot ==
Four men gather for an evening of bridge, but soon the conversation turns to mysterious events: mind transfer, occult phenomena, and not least all the bells that behave so strangely in the moonlight. The group around the bridge table consists of a writer, a director, and a journalist, who all tell their own stories during the evening about supernatural experiences they believe they have been exposed to. The fourth man, a psychiatrist, believes that everything like that has a natural explanation. He tries to analyze the stories of the others to convince them that there were natural causes behind their experiences.

=== The Author's Tale ===
The author engages a young female actor to play the lead role in his play. It is based on a real drama that occurred 150 years ago, when a young and beautiful socialite disappeared without a trace after playing a party game that involved making herself invisible. No one has been able to solve the mystery until the author, the female actor, and a male actor travel to the lady's old home. Over the course of two eerie days, they discover that the female actor identifies with the dead wife and sense the solution to the mystery.

=== The Director's Tale ===
The director experiences a crisis in his marriage. He has been completely bewitched by his wife's cousin and is tormented by guilt, but he still cannot get out of the relationship. However, mysterious things happen, caused by the director's daughter's doll. It has magical power and, among other things, can dance on moonbeams.

=== The Journalist's Tale ===
The journalist experiences something very strange when he decided to investigate an old shipwreck. The ship's pilot had steered directly onto a dangerous reef, and he was convicted and stripped of his pilot's license despite the fact that he had seen the beacons that were supposed to guide them around. The journalist has some strange dreams, and he believes that evil forces were behind the shipwreck. The journalist goes to the pilot's hometown, where he experiences several mysterious things.

== Reception ==
Reviews in the newspapers Verdens Gang, Dagsavisen, and Aftenposten gave the film a "die throw" of four.

== Cast ==
=== The Bridge Party ===
- Henny Moan as the hostess
- Lars Nordrum as the author
- Frank Robert as the director
- Rolf Søder as the journalist
- Hans Stormoen as the psychiatrist

=== The Author's Tale ===
- Erling Lindahl as Hamel the chamberlain
- Henny Moan as the chamberlain's wife
- Sverre Wilberg as Preben Berle
- Erna Schøyen as the cook's maid
- Liv Uchermann Selmer as the chambermaid
- Turid Balke as the kitchen maid
- Bjørg Engh as the maid
- Andreas Diesen as the kitchen boy
- Henny Moan as the actress
- Sverre Wilberg as the actor

=== The Director's Tale ===
- Randi Kolstad as the lady
- Madeleine Borch as the daughter
- Anita Thallaug as the model
- Tore Foss as the pediatrician

=== The Journalist's Tale ===
- Leif Enger as the art dealer
- Stevelin Urdahl as a sailor
- Knut Hultgren as a sailor
- Alf Malland as the mate
- Berit Søder as the journalist's wife
- Vegard Hall as Zaubermann thepainter
- Rønnaug Alten as Miss Fuhre
- Henny Skjønberg as Mrs. Kjos
- Egil Lorck as Hogne, the ship's captain
