= Svendsen går videre =

- Directed by: Nils R. Müller
- Written by: Carsten Byhring
- Produced by: Rolf W. Popp
- Starring: Carsten Byhring; Henki Kolstad; Kari Diesen
- Cinematography: Per G. Jonson; Tore Breda Thoresen
- Edited by: Olav Engebretsen
- Release date: 1949
- Country: Norway
- Language: Norwegian

Svendsen går videre (Svendsen Goes On) is a Norwegian film from 1949 directed by Nils R. Müller. It is the story of one man's struggle against bureaucracy. It was a campaign film partially financed by Norway's Conservative Party.

== Plot ==
Svendsen is played by Carsten Byhring, who wrote the script. He goes out to buy tobacco and meets various people. Through these meetings, it is clear that the state, with its taxes and fees, is the only party that benefits from the transactions.

== Cast ==
- Carsten Byhring as Svendsen
- Henki Kolstad as Henrik, a member of the Labor Party
- Kari Diesen as Ophelia Andersen
- Arvid Nilssen as Christian Andersen
- Carsten Winger as a bookstore clerk
- Erna Schøyen
- Einar Vaage
- Helge Essmar
- Bjarne Bø
- Hans Bille
- Johannes Eckhoff
- Sophus Dahl
- Arve Opsahl
- Gaselle Müller
- Eugen Skjønberg
- Erik Lassen
- Dan Fosse
- Finn Mehlum
- Sigurd Werring
