= Selv om de er små =

- Directed by: Nils-Reinhardt Christensen
- Written by: Nils-Reinhardt Christensen
- Produced by: Per Gunnar Jonson
- Starring: Odd Borg; Liv Wilse; Lille Grethe; Bab Christensen; Henki Kolstad; Lars Nordrum
- Cinematography: Nils-Reinhardt Christensen
- Edited by: Olav Engebretsen
- Music by: Finn Ludt
- Distributed by: Syncron-film AS
- Release date: December 26, 1957
- Running time: 81 minutes
- Country: Norway
- Language: Norwegian

Selv om de er små (Even If They Are Little) is a Norwegian family film starring Lille Grethe. The film premiered on December 26, 1957.

== Plot ==
Brit's mother and father are divorced. Brit lives with her mother in Oslo, but she feels strongly attracted to her father. She is no longer allowed to visit him because he has remarried to a cabaret singer. Her father is a composer, and her mother wants to keep her daughter away from this artistic environment. However, Brit wants to go to her father. During her summer vacation, she escapes from the children's camp. She hikes along a country road and gets a ride with a scrap dealer. He understands that something is troubling Brit and wants to help her. Brit leaves him, and she gets a ride from an engineer. After that, she trudges alone on a shortcut through the forest, experiences strange things, and finally reaches her father's somewhat remote cottage. Her father's new wife is not the kind of person that Brit's mother said she is. Brit's problems with adults become increasingly complex.

== Cast ==
- Odd Borg as Einar Helle, Brit's father
- Liv Wilse as Rita Helle, Einar's new wife
- Lille Grethe as Brit Helle, 10 years old
- Bab Christensen as Haldis Helle, Brit's mother
- Henki Kolstad as Tallaksen, a scrap dealer
- Lars Nordrum as Bernt Friis
- Åsta Hjelm
- Dan Fosse
- Kari Sundby
- Anne Borg as Turid Ås, a dancer
- Rolf Just Nilsen
