= Gylne ungdom =

- Directed by: Leif Sinding
- Written by: Leif Sinding
- Produced by: Martin S. Knutsen
- Starring: Odd Borg; Urda Arneberg; Tom Tellefsen; Tore Foss; Gretelill Fries; Randi Brænne
- Cinematography: Ragnar Sørensen
- Edited by: Olav Engebretsen
- Music by: Frank Cook
- Distributed by: Elite-Film
- Release date: August 20, 1956
- Running time: 86 minutes
- Country: Norway
- Language: Norwegian

Gylne ungdom (Golden Youth) is a Norwegian drama film from 1956. It was directed by Leif Sinding, who also wrote the screenplay.

== Plot ==
The high school student Tom Polden does not have it easy at home. His mother lives in the memories of her husband, the lawyer Ernst Polden. Her hat shop is doing poorly, and her finances are meager. Tom constantly hears about his great father, and it therefore comes as a shock to him when one day he hears that his father shot himself because he had embezzled a substantial amount of money. At the same time, his mother is threatened with eviction from the apartment because she has not paid rent for several months. In his despondency, Tom break into a grocery store in desperation to obtain money. Then the web starts tightening around him. A cynical young boy gets Tom in his power, and against his will he is forced into theft, stealing from cottages, and brazen burglary. However, Tom's bright spot in life is Eva, a girl in his class that he is infatuated with. The film was seen as the Norwegian version of Rebel Without a Cause with James Dean.

== Cast ==
- Odd Borg as Tom Polden
- Urda Arneberg as Eva
- Tom Tellefsen as Carl-Otto Harling
- Randi Brænne as Dagny Polden, Tom's mother
- Turid Haaland as Carl-Otto's mother
- Joachim Calmeyer as Lorang
- Tore Foss as Jørgen Sommervoll, a doctor
- Gretelill Fries as Constance, Sommervoll's wife
- Dan Fosse as Olaf Vestby, a shopowner
- Egil Hjorth-Jenssen as Christian Dahl, a farm owner
- Willie Hoel as Halvor Nesset, a farmer
- Ella Hval as a saleswoman
- Berit Kullander as a dancer
- Per Lillo-Stenberg as Per Callier
