= Ragnar Sørensen =

Norwegian cinematographer (1915–1998)

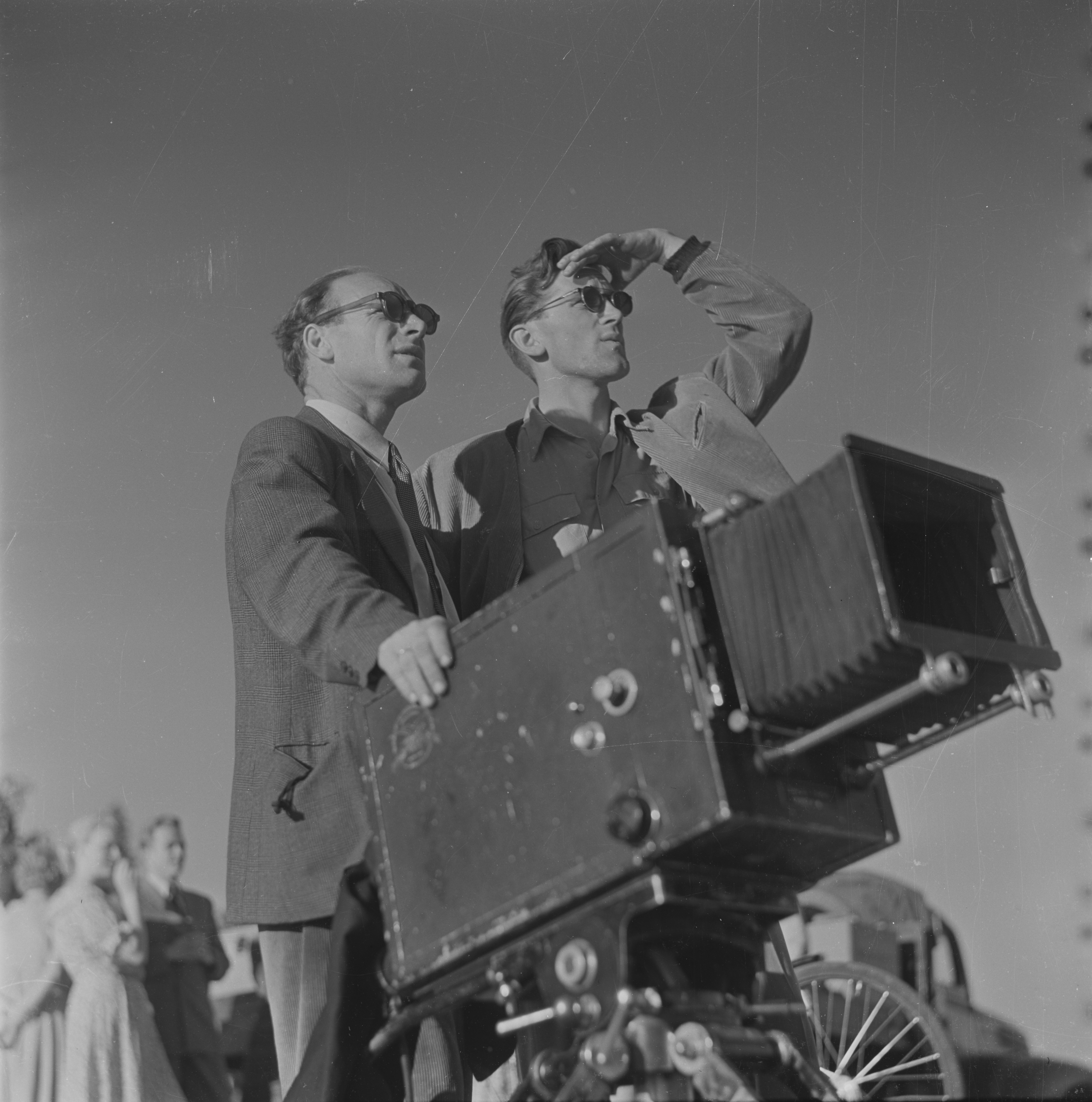
- Director Kåre Bergstrøm and cameraman Ragnar Sørensen during the filming of Andrine og Kjell (1952)
- Born: February 16, 1915; Oslo, Norway
- Died: February 3, 1998 (aged 82); Bærum, Norway
- Occupation: Cinematographer
- Awards: Filmkritikerprisen (1958)

Ragnar Sørensen (February 16, 1915 – February 3, 1998) was a Norwegian cinematographer.

Sørensen made his debut as a camera assistant for the Norwegian film comedy Den forsvundne pølsemaker (1941) and as a focus puller for the comedy En herre med bart (1942). He made his debut as chief photographer with Nils R. Müller's Så møtes vi imorgen (1946). He soon became one of Norway's leading photographers with major assignments for directors such as Arne Skouen, Kåre Bergstrøm, Rasmus Breistein, and Tancred Ibsen. He particularly excelled in the black-and-white medium, and his most famous assignments were Arne Skouen's debut film Gategutter (1949), Tancred Ibsen's Storfolk og småfolk (1951), Kåre Bergstrøm and Radoš Novaković's Blodveien (1955), and Bergstrøm's De dødes tjern (1958, which was also the first Norwegian film created with CinemaScope). In the 1960s, he was the cinematographer for Tancred Ibsen's Venner (1960), Nils Reinhardt Christensen's Line (1961), and Arne Skouen's Om Tilla (1963). In 1969 he was the cinematographer for Himmel og helvete, which was also his last feature film.

Sørensen was the cinematographer for 26 feature films, and he also directed some of the short documentary films about Oslo (collectively known as the Oslo films): Klipp fra Oslo kinematografers arkiv (1955), Nye forstadsbaner i Oslo (1958), and Oslo havn (1957).

In 1961 he received the Aamot Award (Norwegian: Aamotstatuetten) for his work.

== Filmography ==
- 1941: Den forsvundne pølsemaker
- 1942: En herre med bart
- 1943: Den nye lægen
- 1946: Så møtes vi imorgen
- 1948: Den hemmelighetsfulle leiligheten
- 1949: Gategutter
- 1950: Det store varpet
- 1951: Storfolk og småfolk
- 1952: Andrine og Kjell
- 1952: Det kunne vært deg
- 1955: Blodveien
- 1956: Gylne ungdom
- 1956: Toya
- 1957: Ni liv
- 1957: Toya & Heidi
- 1958: De dødes tjern
- 1959: Støv på hjernen
- 1960: Millionær for en aften
- 1960: Venner
- 1961: Line
- 1961: Sønner av Norge
- 1962: Kalde spor
- 1962: Prozor u svet
- 1962: Sønner av Norge kjøper bil
- 1963: Om Tilla
- 1964: Pappa tar gull
- 1969: Himmel og helvete
