= Vi flyr på Rio =

- Directed by: Henki Kolstad (Norwegian version); Åke Ohberg (Swedish version)
- Written by: Sigurd Hoel, Rune Lindström
- Produced by: Åke Ohberg
- Starring: Åke Ohberg; Lars Nordrum; Lauritz Falk; Per Oscarsson; Helen Brinchmann; Henki Kolstad
- Cinematography: Hilmar Ekdahl
- Edited by: Ragnar Engström
- Music by: Gunnar Sønstevold
- Distributed by: AB Svea Film; Europa Film A/S
- Release dates: October 26, 1949 (Sweden); November 17, 1949 (Norway)
- Running time: 100 minutes
- Countries: Sweden, Norway
- Languages: Swedish, Norwegian

Vi flyr på Rio (Swedish: Vi flyger på Rio, We're Flying to Rio) is a Swedish–Norwegian drama film from 1949.

== Plot ==
When airline captain Curt Åhs comes home one day, he discovers that his wife has been unfaithful. Curt gets to know the flight attendant Berit. They experience adventure together during a flight to Rio de Janeiro.

== Background and reception ==
The film had its Norwegian premiere on November 17, 1949 and was about Scandinavian Airlines' long-haul flights on the new route to South America. The film included an authentic crash scene, which was originally shown in the Swedish film Ungdom av idag (Youth of Today). The critics gave the film mixed reviews. On the one hand, they one praised the actors but, on the other hand, they considered the story to sometimes be hackneyed and lacking depth.

== Cast ==
- Åke Ohberg as Curt Åhs, the captain
- Inger Juel as Karin Åhs, his wife
- Lars Nordrum as Frans Hauge, the pilot
- Per Oscarsson as Helmer Wallberg, the co-pilot
- Margareta Fahlén as Berit Thorsson, a stewardess (Swedish version)
- Helen Brinchmann as Berit Thorsson, a stewardess (Norwegian version)
- Urda Arneberg as Li Arnessen, a stewardess
- Lauritz Falk as Eyvind Lynge, the radio man
- Åke Söderblom as Fridolf, the mechanic
- Henki Kolstad as Bonzo, the purser
- Sonja Wigert as Irene Gruwe
- Brita Bigum as the English-speaking cabaret singer
