= Erna Schøyen =

Norwegian actress (1887–1968)

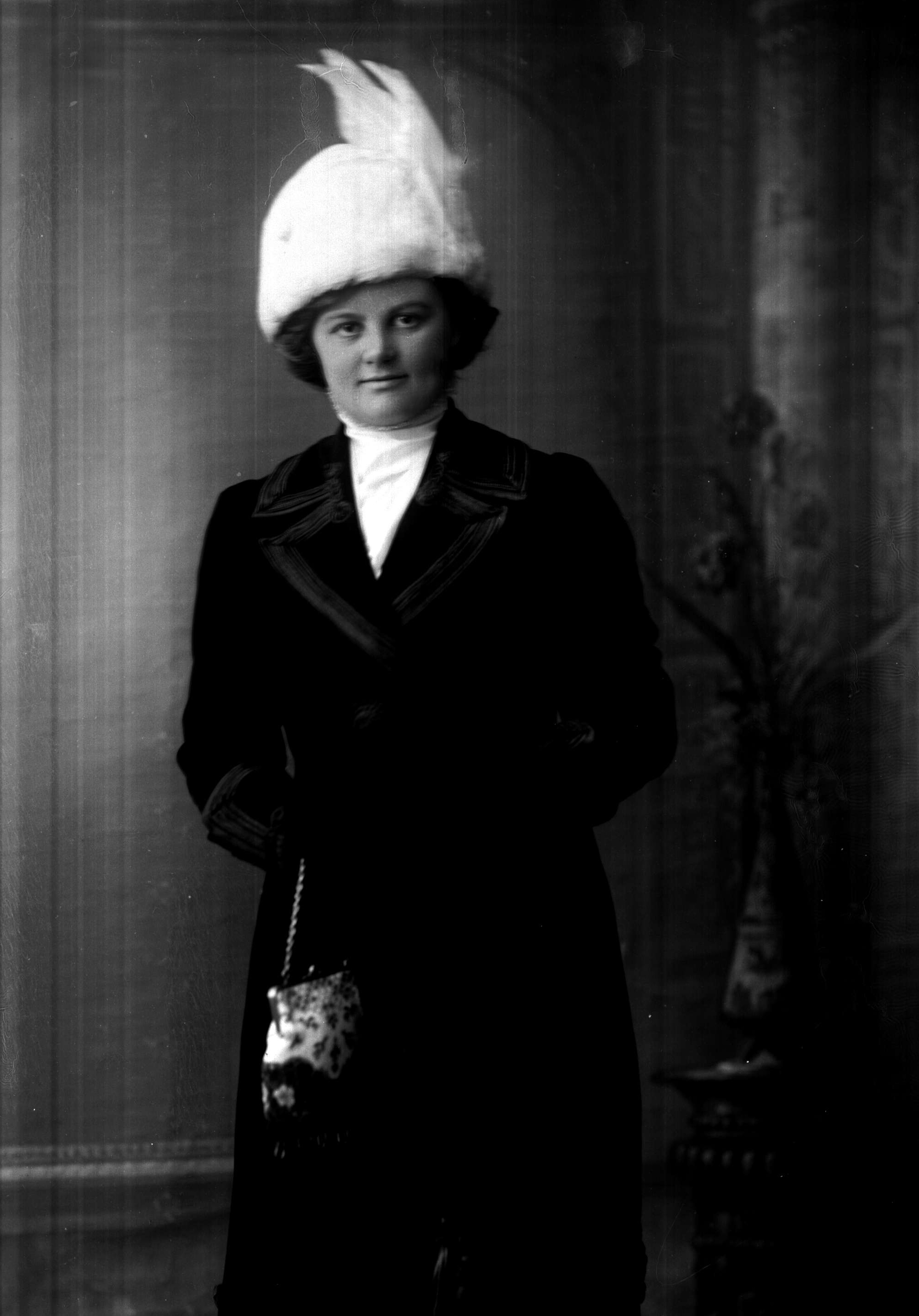
- Born: March 1, 1887; Kabelvåg, Norway
- Died: December 21, 1968 (aged 81); Oslo, Norway
- Occupation: Actress
- Years active: 1906–1965

Erna Kamilla Schøyen (born Erna Kamille Berg, March 1, 1887 – December 21, 1968) was a Norwegian actress.

== Career ==
Schøyen trained as an actress at the National Theatre from 1905 to 1906, and she had her debut at the Fahlstrøm Theater in 1906. She remained there until she relocated to the Central Theater in 1911, where she worked until 1959. Schøyen was also engaged with Chat Noir from 1920 to 1924.

Schøyen also appeared in dozens of films, including some of Norway's first silent films. When Alice in Wonderland was dubbed into Norwegian in 1951, Schøyen played one of the voices. She was a master of the Northern Norwegian dialect and played the grandmother of Bodø (nicknamed after a town in northern Norway) in one of the Stompa films, based on the Jennings novels. Schøyen continued working until she was almost 80 years old.

== Family ==
Schøyen was born Erna Kamille Berg in Kabelvåg to the bookseller Ørger Johannes Berg (1860–?) and Kamilla Hamine Benjaminsen (1865–1938). She married the entomologist Thor Hiorth Schøyen (1885–1961) on June 19, 1910. Their daughter was the actress Vivi Schøyen (1918–2014), who was the mother of the journalist Hege Duckert (born 1962).

== Filmography ==
- 1916: Under kjærlighedens aak
- 1917: Synd skal sones
- 1917: Livets gøglespil
- 1917: Hjertetyven
- 1936: Vi vil oss et land...
- 1940: Tørres Snørtevold
- 1941: Hansen og Hansen
- 1943: Sangen til livet
- 1943: Den nye lægen
- 1944: Kommer du, Elsa?
- 1946: Om kjærligheten synger de
- 1946: To liv
- 1948: Trollfossen
- 1949: Svendsen går videre
- 1951: Vi gifter oss
- 1952: Trine!
- 1956: Kvinnens plass
- 1959: Hete septemberdager
- 1960: Venner
- 1961: Den store barnedåpen (TV)
- 1961: Et øye på hver finger
- 1962: Stompa & Co
- 1963: Kranes konditori (TV)
- 1964: Alle tiders kupp
- 1964: Klokker i måneskinn
- 1965: Hjelp – vi får leilighet!
