= Støv på hjernen =

Støv på hjernen can refer to the following:

- Støv på hjernen (1959 film), a 1959 Norwegian film
- Støv på hjernen (1961 film), a 1961 Danish film, a remake of the above film
