= Wilfred Breistrand =

Norwegian actor and film director (1921–2007)

- Born: April 29, 1921; Trondheim, Norway
- Died: August 3, 2007 (aged 86); Asker, Norway
- Occupations: Actor and film director
- Children: Ulf Breistrand

Wilfred Breistrand (April 29, 1921 – August 3, 2007) was a Norwegian actor and film director.

== Biography ==
Breistrand made his debut in 1941 at the Trøndelag Theater as Amund in Til Sæters by Claus Pavels Riis. He performed there until 1944, at the New Theater from 1944 to 1948, at the National Theatre in Oslo from 1948 to 1970, with NRK's Television Theater from 1970 to 1973, and with the Norwegian theater after 1973. Among other roles, he played Elias in Bjørnstjerne Bjørnson's Over ævne I, Gustav in Helge Krog's Konkylien, Lebcau in Arthur Miller's Incident at Vichy (Norwegian title: Det hendte i Vichy), various roles in Shakespeare plays (Bottom in A Midsummer Night's Dream, Banquo in Macbeth, and Horatio in Hamlet), and the title role in Ambassador (Norwegian title: Ambassadøren) by Sławomir Mrożek. He appeared in a large number of Norwegian films, debuting in Ni liv in 1957. He also played leading roles in the television drama De hvite bussene (1989), Anton (1973), and Åpenbaringen (1977). Breistrand received the Amanda Award for best actor in 1992 for the role of Thomas F in the television drama Th. F's siste nedtegnelser til almenheten, based on the novels of Kjell Askildsen.

Breistrand was the father of the film director and writer Ulf Breistrand.

== Filmography ==
=== As actor ===
- 1956: Kvinnens plass as an editorial staff member
- 1957: Ni liv as a sled puller
- 1960: Den fjerde nattevakt (TV) as David Finne
- 1960: Venner as the senior resident attending physician
- 1961: Den store barnedåpen (TV) as Storm, a curate
- 1961: Hans Nielsen Hauge as a lieutenant in Fredrikstad
- 1961: Sønner av Norge as the client at the tax appraisal office
- 1962: Sønner av Norge kjøper bil as a car mechanic
- 1964: Alle tiders kupp as Berg, a police officer
- 1964: Husmorfilmen høsten 1964
- 1965: De kalte ham Skarven as Lecturer Marbo
- 1966: Før frostnettene as Jens Gunnerus
- 1966: Kontorsjef Tangen (TV series)
- 1966: Sult
- 1968: Smuglere
- 1968: Unge helter as Captain Kantzeler
- 1970: Balladen om mestertyven Ole Høiland as Enger the watchmaker
- 1972: Motforestilling
- 1973: Anton as Anton's father
- 1973: Kirsebærhaven (TV) as Simjeonov Pistsjik
- 1974: Olsenbanden møter Kongen & Knekten as the crime boss
- 1975: Faneflukt as a German officer
- 1975: Skraphandlerne as Arthur Hagen
- 1976: Bør Børson II as Olsen Jammerdal
- 1976: Den sommeren jeg fylte 15 as the father
- 1976: Vårnatt as the father
- 1977: Åpenbaringen as Walter
- 1977: Olsenbanden & Dynamitt-Harry på sporet as the crime boss
- 1982: Fleksnes fataliteter (TV series, episode: "Villmarkens sønn") as the doctor
- 1983: Hockeyfeber as Mr. Big
- 1983: Piratene as Dr. Bakke
- 1988: De hvite bussene (TV) as Niels Christian Ditleff
- 1989: Fedrelandet (TV drama) as Old Eggen
- 1989: Thomas F's siste nedtegnelser til almenheten as Thomas F
- 1996: Markus og Diana as the father
- 1996: Spor as man no. 1
- 1996: Syndig sommer
- 2000: Før stormen as Sander's father
- 2001: Nini (TV series, episode: "Den kalkulerte risiko") as Hanzen

=== As director ===
- 1965: De kalte ham Skarven
