= Peter van Heeren =

- Directed by: Sigval Maartmann-Moe
- Written by: Alf Bonnevie Bryn; Sigval Maartmann-Moe
- Based on: Alf Bonnevie Bryn's novel Peter van Heeren tar skeen i den anden haand
- Produced by: Martin S. Knutsen
- Starring: Per Skift; Liv Wilse; Ernst Diesen; Knut Mørch Hansson; Odd Borg
- Cinematography: Per G. Jonson
- Edited by: Olav Engebretsen
- Music by: Egil Monn-Iversen
- Distributed by: Kommunenes Filmcentral
- Release date: February 21, 1957
- Running time: 95 minutes
- Country: Norway
- Language: Norwegian

Peter van Heeren is a Norwegian crime film from 1957. It is based on Alf Bonnevie Bryn's debut crime novel, Peter van Heeren tar skeen i den anden haand (Peter van Heeren Holds His Spoon in His Other Hand). The novel was adapted for film by Sigval Maartmann-Moe, who also directed the film.

== Plot ==
The film is about the rich, eccentric, and amiable idler Peter van Heeren (played by Per Skift) and his many companies. He is persuaded to help his friend, Mrs. Kathie Winter (Liv Wilse), who is exposed to a certain appellate court attorney Halmer, who tries to win her favor though blackmail and other unorthodox methods. Peter van Heeren receives help from his inimitable butler Jeremias (Ernst Diesen).

== Cast ==
- Per Skift as Peter van Heeren
- Liv Wilse as Käthie Winther
- Ernst Diesen as Jeremias, van Heeren's butler
- Knut M. Hansson as Halmer
- Ola Isene as the police chief
- Helge Essmar as the director
- Willie Hoel as a close friend of van Heeren
- Per Lillo-Stenberg as a friend of van Heeren
- Lillebil Nordrum as Miss Lyng
- Leif Enger as an auctioneer
- Erik Melbye Brekke as a night-shift worker
- Dan Fosse as a criminal
- Per Theodor Haugen as an office clerk
- Aud Schønemann as a customer
- Gustav-Adolf Hegh as a car rental employee
- Odd Borg as a taxi driver
- Tore Ween as a jeweler
- Berit Kullander as a spectator
