= Kvinnens plass =

- Directed by: Nils R. Müller
- Written by: Nils R. Müller; Eva Seeberg
- Produced by: Nils R. Müller; Bjarne Stokland
- Starring: Lars Nordrum; Inger Marie Andersen
- Cinematography: Per Gunnar Jonson
- Edited by: Nils R. Müller
- Music by: Egil Monn-Iversen; Bjørn Woll
- Distributed by: Kommunenes Filmcentral
- Release date: 1956
- Running time: 94 minutes
- Country: Norway
- Language: Norwegian

Kvinnens plass (A Woman's Place) is a Norwegian drama film from 1956 directed by Nils R. Müller. The script was written by Müller and Eva Seeberg.

== Plot ==
The journalist Tore Haugen returns to Norway from the United States. He falls in love with the journalist Tore Næss and soon discovers that he has a job with the same newspaper as her. Næss shows outstanding qualities and develops into a star reporter, whereas Haugen is mediocre. When they have children together, the question arises which of them will sacrifice their career to be at home with the child. Haugen soon finds himself comfortable in the role of a stay-at-home father.

== Cast ==
- Lars Nordrum as Tore Haugen
- Inger Marie Andersen as Tore Ness
- Harald Aimarsen as a newspaper employee
- Haakon Arnold
- Pål Bang-Hansen as a newspaper employee
- Odd Borg as Per, a journalist
- Wilfred Breistrand as an editorial staff member
- Hilde Brenni
- Lalla Carlsen as the boardinghouse operator
- Kari Diesen
- Oscar Egede-Nissen as a man that saw a UFO
- Helge Essmar as the director's secretary
- Jack Fjeldstad as the insurance agent
- Dan Fosse as a man that saw a UFO
- Hilde Grythe as Tore and Tore's child
- Turid Haaland as the mother
- Knut M. Hansson as a newspaper employee
- Willie Hoel as Teodor
- Ella Hval as Mrs. Steffensen
- Mette Lange-Nielsen
- Erik Lassen as a newspaper employee
- Per Lillo-Stenberg as a newspaper employee
- Erling Lindahl as an editorial staff member
- Fridtjof Mjøen as the editor
- Kari Neegård
- Siri Rom as a waitress
- Aud Schønemann as Miss Stjernhol
- Erna Schøyen
- Eugen Skjønberg
- Rolf Søder as a man that saw a UFO
- Kirsten Sørlie
