= Lars Nordrum =

Norwegian actor

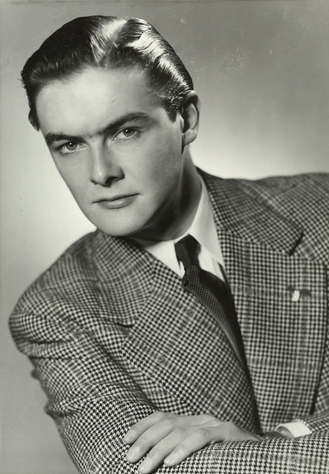
- Born: October 28, 1921; Oslo, Norway
- Died: January 25, 1973 (aged 51); Oslo, Norway
- Occupation: Actor
- Years active: 1940–1973

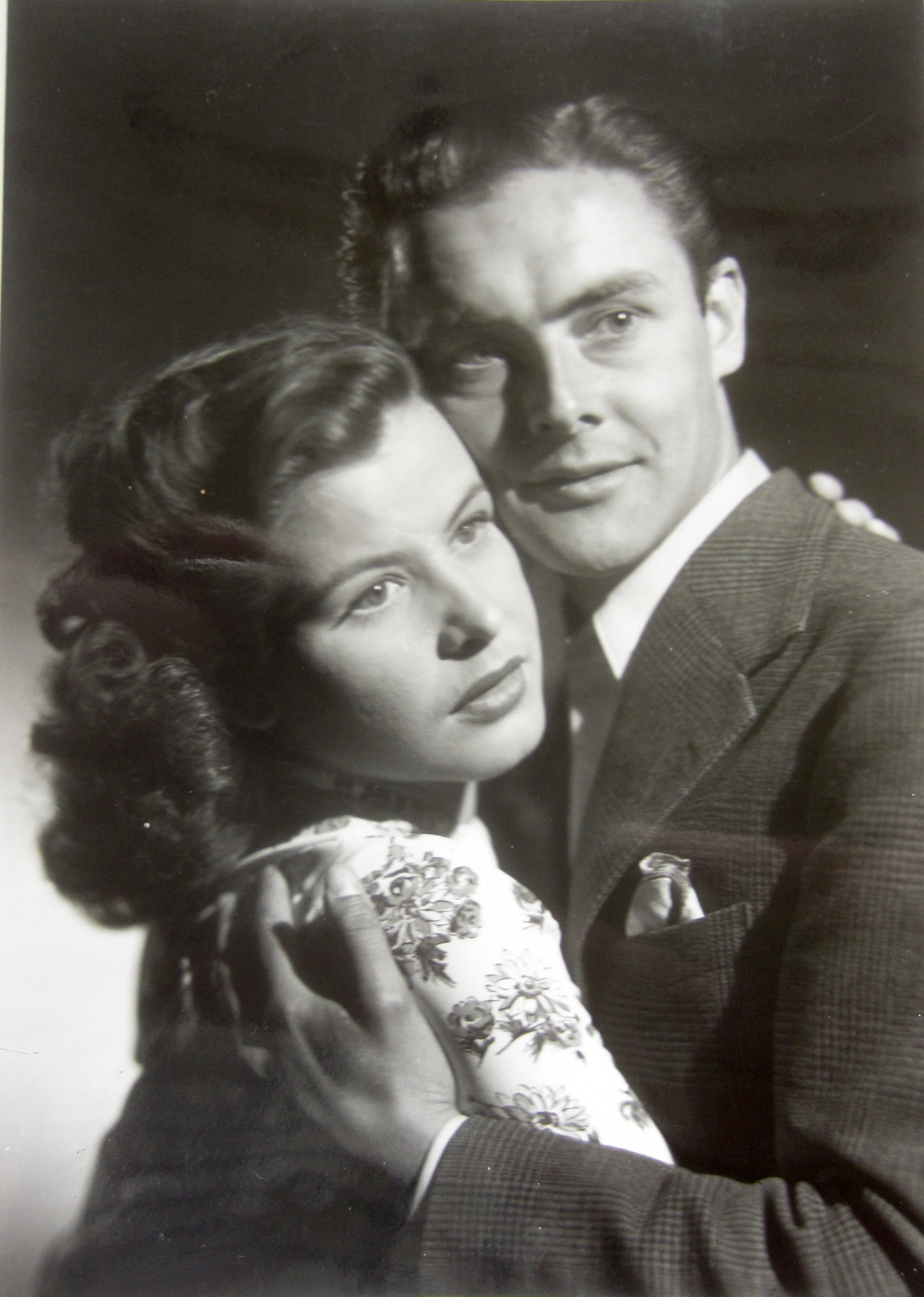
Maj-Britt Nilsson and Lars Nordrum in Resan bort from 1945. Photo by Louis Huch.

Lars Einar Nordrum (October 28, 1921 – January 25, 1973) was a Norwegian theater and film actor. He is especially remembered for acting the voice of Jennings (Norwegian: Stompa) in a series of Norwegian radio plays in the 1950s and 1960s.

== Biography ==
Nordrum debuted in 1935 at the Central Theater, and from 1938 onward was engaged with the National Theater, except for two seasons at the People's Theater. He also played roles in film and on radio. Nordrum was a gifted character artist that created unique stage characters with a strong personal pithiness. He was noted for his comic characters in works by Shakespeare and Holberg, his strong stage presence in The Merry Widow, and his performances in the musical Fantasticks at Chat Noir. As an artist, however, he had his greatest impact in tragic roles, such as the title role in Strindberg's Erik XIV, Oswald in Ghosts, and Earl Harald in Sigurd Slembe.

Nordrum had his film debut with a minor role in Tante Pose (1940), and he played notable roles in films including Vi gifter oss (1951), Vildanden (1963), and Liv (1967). Nordrum also made a strong impression as a pianist in Sverre Udnæs's Aske on NRK's Television Theater in 1973.

Nordrum was married to the Norwegian-born Swedish actress Lillebil Kjellén.

== Filmography ==
- 1940: Tante Pose as Olaf, the dean's son
- 1945: The Journey Away as Ole
- 1948: Hvor fartøy flyte kan (documentary)
- 1949: Vi flyr på Rio as Frans Hauge
- 1951: Vi gifter oss as Einar
- 1954: I moralens navn as Rolf Hagen
- 1955: The Summer Wind Blows as Klaus Aare
- 1956: Kvinnens plass as Tore Haugen
- 1956: Ektemann alene as Per Sande
- 1957: Selv om de er små as Bernt Friis
- 1960: Veien tilbake as Øyvind Dahl, a violinist
- 1963: Onkel Vanja (TV)
- 1964: Vildanden as Gregers Werle
- 1964: Elskeren (TV)
- 1964: Klokker i måneskinn as the author "Bridgepartiet"
- 1964: Nydelige nelliker as the narrator
- 1965: De kalte ham Skarven as Pastor Bardal
- 1965: Klimaks as Krister's father
- 1966: Sult as Hertugen (not credited)
- 1967: Liv as the fashion designer
- 1968: Festival i Venedig as Prince Luigi Bourbon Corieli (TV)
- 1970: Døden i gatene
- 1973: Anton as Dr. Fuchs
- 1973: Aske as the pianist (TV)
- 1974: Sommerfuglene as Mr. Zimmler
