= Erling Lindahl =

Norwegian actor and director (1903–1973)

- Born: June 23, 1903; Bergen, Norway
- Died: August 8, 1973 (aged 70)
- Occupations: Actor and stage director

Erling Lindahl (Juni 23, 1903 – August 8, 1973) was a Norwegian actor and stage director.

Lindahl debuted in 1933 at the Comedy Theater (Norwegian: Komediateatret) in Bergen and later performed at the National Theater. He appeared in many films and performed at various theaters. Lindahl played several strong character roles. He frequently appeared on NRK's Radio Theater. From 1967 until his death in 1973, Lindahl was engaged with the National Traveling Theater.

== Filmography ==
- 1955: Hjem går vi ikke
- 1956: Kvinnens plass as an editorial staff member
- 1956: Toya as a doctor
- 1957: På slaget åtte as Haugen, a journalist
- 1957: Stevnemøte med glemte år as J. L. Ruud, a gynecologist
- 1957: Toya og Heidi as Uncle Erling
- 1958: De dødes tjern as Kai Bugge, a psychologist
- 1958: I slik en natt as the interrogator
- 1958: Pastor Jarman kommer hjem
- 1958: Ut av mørket as the physician
- 1961: Den anstendige skjøgen (TV) as the senator
- 1961: Hans Nielsen Hauge as Hoffgaard, the bailiff in Smålenene
- 1961: I faresonen
- 1961: Sønner av Norge as the man in the newspaper editorial office
- 1962: Eurydike (TV)
- 1963: Fuglen i La Plata (TV)
- 1963: Kranes konditori (TV) as Buck
- 1964: Alle tiders kupp as Iversen the office manager
- 1964: Klokker i måneskinn as the chamberlain in The Author's Tale
- 1964: Nydelige nelliker as the actor
- 1966: Broder Gabrielsen as the judge
- 1968: Smuglere as Toller
- 1970: En Hanske (TV) as Hoff
