= Dan Fosse =

Norwegian actor

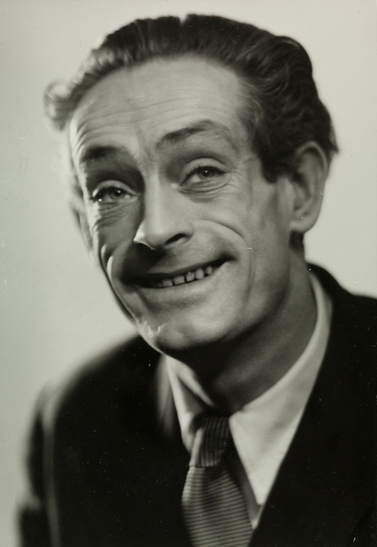
- Dan Fosse c. 1965
- Born: February 26, 1918
- Died: December 6, 1987 (aged 69)
- Occupation: Actor
- Children: Veslemøy Fosse Ree

Dan Fosse (February 26, 1918 – December 6, 1987) was a Norwegian actor. He is best known for his role as the housemaster Haukås in the Stompa films and as the voice of Bodø in the radio plays about Stompa & Co.

== Family ==
Dan Fosse was the father of the teacher Dan Harald Fosse and the makeup artist Veslemøy Fosse Ree.

== Career ==
Fosse performed at the Edderkoppen Theater in 1962 and 1963 in the productions Skikk og bruk and Julebokken 1961. He also performed as an actor at the National Theater in 1968 and 1969 and participated in productions of The Memorandum (Norwegian title: Sirkulæret) and Rosencrantz and Guildenstern Are Dead (Norwegian title: Rosenkrantz og Gyldenstern er døde).

Fosse was a language phenomenon ahead of some in Norwegian revue because he mastered many different dialects, which served him well in the interpretation of his many role types. He is also known from five films about the Olsen Gang, in which he played a guard and a butler.

Radio was also an important medium for Fosse. In addition to the Stompa radio plays, which were a great success in the Saturday children's program, he also contributed to many NRK Radio Theater plays in the 1970s. Some of his best-known contributions can be found in the series Dickie Dick Dickens and God aften, mitt navn er Cox.

== Filmography ==
- 1949: Svendsen går videre
- 1953: Skøytekongen
- 1956: Bjørnepatruljen
- 1956: Gylne ungdom as Olaf Vestby, a shopowner
- 1956: Kvinnens plass as the man that saw a UFO
- 1957: Peter van Heeren
- 1957: Selv om de er små
- 1957: Smuglere i smoking
- 1958: På tokt med Terna
- 1960: Veien tilbake
- 1962: Stompa & Co as Haukås the housemaster
- 1963: Stompa, selvfølgelig! as Haukås the housemaster
- 1964: Alle tiders kupp as the clerk at the alcoholic beverage retailer
- 1964: Husmorfilmen høsten 1964
- 1964: Pappa tar gull as Nille
- 1965: To på topp as the galley boy
- 1966: Kontorsjef Tangen
- 1967: Min kones ferie as the reindeer driver
- 1968: Skipper Worse
- 1969: An-Magritt as Gørr-Ola
- 1969: 22. november – den store leiegården as the ticket seller
- 1970: Balladen om mestertyven Ole Høiland as Emanuel
- 1970: Olsenbanden og Dynamitt-Harry as the guard at the state bank
- 1974: Under en steinhimmel as Emanuel
- 1975: Olsenbandens siste bedrifter as the guard with a dog
- 1976: Olsenbanden for full musikk as Joachim
- 1977: Olsenbanden og Dynamitt-Harry på sporet as the guard with a dog
- 1978: Olsenbanden og Data-Harry sprenger verdensbanken as the traffic warden
- 1981: Fleksnes fataliteter as the man in the national library archives
