= Knut Hultgren =

Norwegian actor (1910–1985)

- Born: March 22, 1910; Helsingborg, Sweden
- Died: October 20, 1985 (aged 75)
- Resting place: Nordre gravlund
- Occupation: Actor

Knut Edvard Hultgren (March 22, 1910 – October 20, 1985) was a Norwegian actor.

Hultgren was born in Helsingborg, Sweden. He performed at the New Theater and its successor, the Oslo New Theater, the People's Theater, and the National Theater in Oslo. Hultgren made his film debut in 1961 in Sønner av Norge, and he appeared in nine films altogether until 1977.

== Filmography ==
- 1961: Sønner av Norge as a member of the Norwegian Home Guard
- 1961: Den anstendige skjøgen (TV)
- 1964: Klokker i måneskinn as a sailor
- 1965: To på topp
- 1967: De blanke knappene (TV)
- 1968: Rettssaka mot Leroi Jones (TV)
- 1975: Olsenbandens siste bedrifter as the watchman at the East Railway Station
- 1976: Den sommeren jeg fylte 15 as the priest
- 1977: Karjolsteinen as the shopkeeper
