= Hegh =

Hegh is a Norwegian surname. Notable people with the surname include:

- Anita Hegh (born 1972), Australian actress
- Emilie Hegh Arntzen, Norwegian handball player
- Gustav Adolf Hegh (1927–2010), Norwegian actor
- Hanne Hegh (born 1960), Norwegian handball player
