= Støv på hjernen (1959 film) =

- Directed by: Øyvind Vennerød
- Written by: Jørn Ording; Eva Ramm; Øyvind Vennerød
- Starring: Inger Marie Andersen
- Cinematography: Ragnar Sørensen
- Edited by: Øyvind Vennerød
- Music by: Maj Sønstevold; Magne Soone; Reidar Thommessen
- Release date: 16 August 1959
- Running time: 94 minutes
- Country: Norway
- Language: Norwegian

Støv på hjernen is a 1959 Norwegian comedy film directed by Øyvind Vennerød and starring Inger Marie Andersen and Odd Borg. It was based on a novel by Eva Ramm, and shot on location in Lambertseter.

The film's title translates into "dust on the brain" and the story centers around the busybody housewives of a modern Norwegian working-class neighbourhood of the 1950s. It became an immediate smash hit, was seen by 1.5 million people in Norwegian cinemas, making it one of the most successful Norwegian movies in history (the population of Norway at the time was under 4 million). It has since been repeated often on television. It was followed by two sequels, Sønner av Norge (1961) and Sønner av Norge kjøper bil (1962), and remade in Denmark as Støv på hjernen.

== Cast ==
- Inger Marie Andersen as Randi Svendsen
- Odd Borg as Gunnar Svendsen
- Kari Diesen as Fru Hansen
- Willie Hoel as Herr Hansen
- Lalla Carlsen as Fru Svenkerud
- Unni Bernhoft as Fru Sørensen
- Wenche Foss as Edna Grindheim
- Per Theodor Haugen as Herr Sørensen
- Sverre Holm as Ole Berg
- Liv Wilse as Bitten Helgesen
- Turid Balke as En husmor
- Arne Bang-Hansen
