= Ektemann alene =

- Directed by: Nils R. Müller
- Written by: Nils R. Müller
- Starring: Lars Nordrum; Eva Strøm Aastorp; Karen Randers-Pehrson
- Release date: 8 November 1956
- Running time: 98 minutes
- Country: Norway
- Language: Norwegian

Ektemann alene (English: Husband Alone) is a 1956 Norwegian comedy film written and directed by Nils R. Müller, starring Lars Nordrum, Eva Strøm Aastorp and Karen Randers-Pehrson.

== Plot ==
It is high summer in Oslo. There is an intense bustle on protrusion just before the fjord boat leaves. There is a throng of people on the pier: families who will travel in the country and fathers who will stay at home. Mrs. Rigmor Sande and the two children Vesleper and Titten are all on board and standing by the line. Dad Per Sande, the future lawnmower, is frantically looking for the family's suitcase that has gone astray.

The moorings go and the boat is ready for departure. "Her husband can travel from, but not a suitcase," exclaims the healthy 21-year-old Ellen Stenersen. She and Per are left on the pier. They are old acquaintances and neighbors in the country. Per does not think it's that bad to be a grasshopper. He and his friend Stoffer throw themselves into Oslo's temptations. The guys are also joined by Ellen. Per and Ellen get warm feelings for each other.
