= Karen Randers-Pehrson =

Norwegian actress and stage director (1932–2019)

- Born: 16 August 1932; Oslo, Norway
- Died: 4 February 2019 (aged 86)
- Occupations: Actress and stage director

Karen Randers-Pehrson (16 August 1932 − 4 February 2019) was a Norwegian actress and stage director. She was born in Oslo. She was assigned with the theatres Riksteatret, Trøndelag Teater and Den Nationale Scene. She chaired the Norwegian Actors' Equity Association from 1977 to 1980, and was rector at the Norwegian National Academy of Theatre from 1981 to 1985.

Randers-Pehrson made her film debut in Arne Skouen's Barn av solen in 1955, and played in the comedy Ektemann alene in 1956. Her later films include Kjærleikens ferjereiser (1979), At dere tør! (1980), Krypskyttere (1982), Hard Asphalt (1986), and The Polar Bear King (1991).
