= Turid Haaland =

Norwegian actress

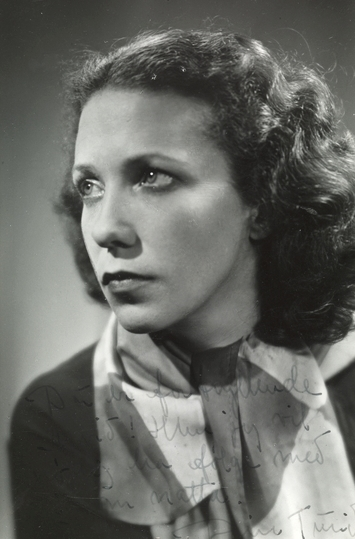
- Turid Haaland c. 1945–1950
- Born: June 23, 1908; Kristiania (now Oslo), Norway
- Died: October 12, 1979 (aged 71)
- Occupation: Actress
- Parents: Ingjald Haaland (father); Mally Carenius Haaland (mother)

Turid Haaland (June 23, 1908 – October 12, 1979) was a Norwegian actress.

Haaland debuted in 1926 at the Norwegian Theater. She played the daughter in Runar Schildt's play Den store rolla, and the character's parents were played by her real parents, Mally Carenius Haaland and Ingjald Haaland, who were both actors. She was later mainly associated with the New Theater (and its successor, the Oslo New Theater), mainly in comedy roles, such as Nille in Jeppe på Bjerget.

Haaland was also active as a film actress. She made her debut in Familien på Borgan in 1939. She was particularly active on the screen in the 1950s, and she starred in several of Arne Skouen's films. She had one of the lead roles in Aldri annet enn bråk.

Haaland performed the voice of Karius in the animated film Karius og Baktus.

== Filmography ==
- 1939: Familien på Borgan as Gurine Plassen
- 1941: Kjærlighet og vennskap as Hulda
- 1943: Vigdis as Nordby's sister
- 1949: Gategutter as Reidar's mother
- 1950: To mistenkelige personer
- 1951: Kranes konditori as Mrs. Fosnes
- 1952: Nødlanding as the telephone operator's wife
- 1954: Aldri annet enn bråk as Hulda Bråten
- 1954: Cirkus Fandango as Carmen
- 1954: Karius og Baktus as Karius (voice)
- 1956: Gylne ungdom as Carl-Otto's mother
- 1956: Kvinnens plass as the mother
- 1957: På slaget åtte
- 1957: Slalåm under himmelen as Mrs. Riesing
- 1958: Bustenskjold as Bernt's wife
- 1958: Pastor Jarman kommer hjem as the waitress
- 1975: Fru Inger til Østråt as the maid
- 1975: Glade vrinsk
