= Carsten Carlsen =

Norwegian pianist and composer

- Born: Carsten Marensius Carlsen; 5 June 1892; Kristiania, Norway
- Died: 28 August 1961 (aged 69)
- Occupations: Pianist and composer
- Spouse: Lalla Carlsen (m. 1917)
- Children: 2

Carsten Marensius Carlsen (5 June 1892 – 28 August 1961) was a Norwegian pianist and composer.

== Biography ==
Carsten Marensius Carlsen was born in Oslo, Norway. His parents were Anton Carlsen (1862–1943) and Louise Larsen (1876–1957). In 1917, he married singer and actress Lalla Carlsen.

He was educated at the Oslo Conservatory of Music from 1909 to 1913, where he studied with Gustav Fredrik Lange (1861–1939) and Per Winge (1858–1935). He was awarded a state composer scholarship to study in Paris from 1921 to 1923. He was appointed kapellmeister at Chat Noir from 1914 to 1938. He worked at the National Theatre of Norway from 1938 to 1941, followed by the Carl Johan Theater from 1941 to 1945.
