= Elisabeth Granneman =

Norwegian actress, writer and musician

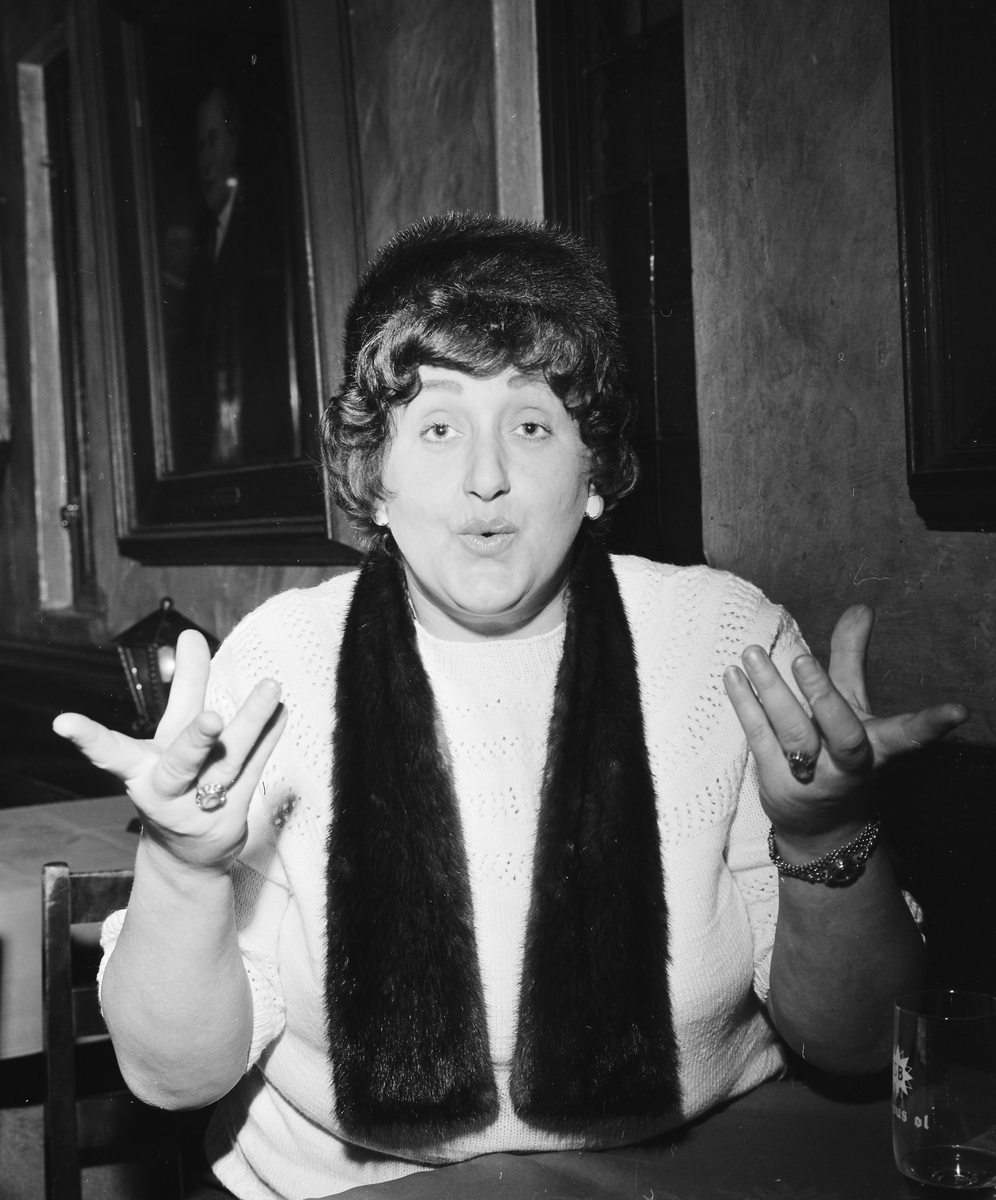
- Elisabeth Granneman in 1963
- Born: Inger Elisabeth Fauk; 11 May 1930; Bergen, Norway
- Died: 28 March 1992 (aged 61); Bærum, Norway
- Occupations: Singer, songwriter, children's writer and actress
- Awards: Leonard Statuette

Elisabeth Granneman (born Inger Elisabeth Fauk; 11 May 1930 – 28 March 1992) was a Norwegian singer, songwriter, children's writer and actress.

== Biography ==
Granneman was born as Inger Elisabeth Fauk in Bergen, Norway to Karl O. Fauk (1909–1976), a sailor and chef, and his wife, Ruth (1896–1980). In her youth, she was a student of classical pianist Robert Riefling (1911–1988) in Lørenskog. She played at the revue theatre Chat Noir from 1960, where she first achieved popularity with Bias Bernhoft's song "Omatt og omatt" in 1961. She married a Dutchman, Johannes Gerardus "Jan" Granneman, with whom she had a son.

Her film debut was in Sønner av Norge from 1961. In 1964, she won the National Final of the Eurovision Song Contest 1964 with the song "Spiral" (which was performed by Arne Bendiksen in the Eurovision Final). From 1976 on, she regularly played at Chat Noir for many years. Among her film appearances is her role in Hud from 1986.

On the television show Here's Elisabeth (1962), she launched the duet "En torsdagskveld i Drøbak" with Rolf Just Nilsen. She was the author of several books including God gammeldags mat which she wrote together with her son, Jan, in 1989. She was awarded the Leif Justers ærespris in 1984 and the Leonard Statuette in 1986. Illness and poor health in general made her professional appearances only occasional from the fall of 1991. She died on 28 March 1992, aged 61.
