= Troll i ord =

- Directed by: Jon Lennart Mjøen; Olav Engebretsen
- Written by: Paal Roschberg; Jon Lennart Mjøen; Eiliv Odde Hauge
- Produced by: Jack Hald
- Starring: Jytte Ibsen; Henki Kolstad; Inger Marie Andersen; Ib Schønberg; Guri Stormoen; Marius Eriksen Jr. Joachim Holst-Jensen; Liv Wilse
- Cinematography: Sverre Bergli
- Edited by: Olav Engebretsen
- Music by: Egil Monn-Iversen
- Distributed by: Kommunenes filmcentral
- Release date: September 13, 1954
- Running time: 92 minutes
- Country: Norway
- Language: Norwegian

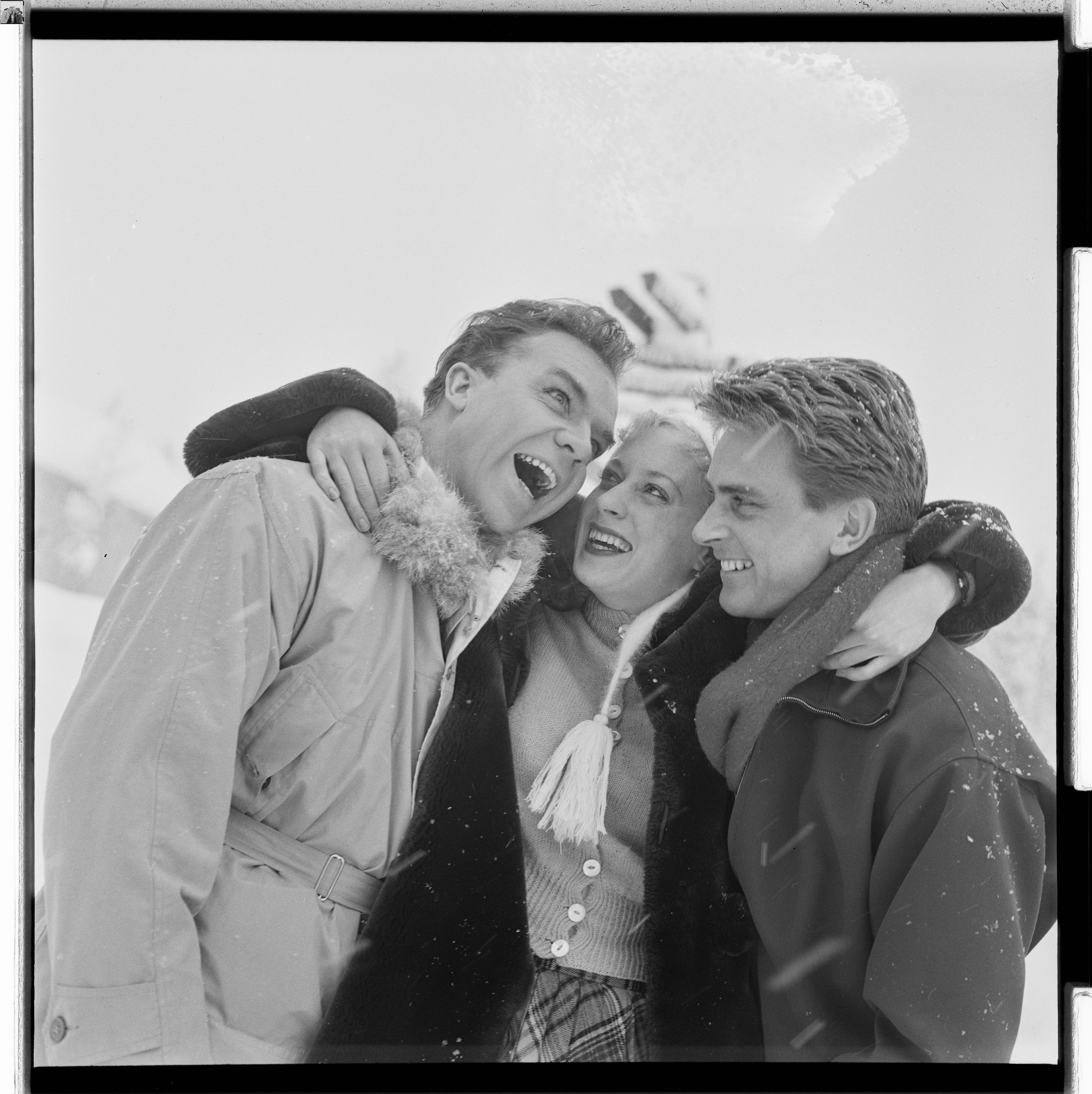
Still of Troll i Ord, courtesy of the National Archives of Norway

Troll i ord (English: Watch What You Say) is a Norwegian comedy film from 1954. The film was directed by Jon Lennart Mjøen and Olav Engebretsen.

The action in the film takes place at a hotel in the high mountains just before Easter. The main roles are played by the Norwegian actors Henki Kolstad, Inger Marie Andersen, and Guri Stormoen and the Danish actors Ib Schønberg and Jytte Ibsen. The alpinist Marius Eriksen Jr. plays a ski trainer, and the Marius sweater was featured in the film. Troll i ord also contains several song numbers, including the hit "Vinter i eventyrland" (Winter in Wonderland) with The Monn Keys. The outdoor scenes were filmed at Skeikampen in Gausdal Municipality.

== Cast ==
- Inger Marie Andersen as Ebba Winger
- Ib Schønberg as Ib Fjeldstrup
- Henki Kolstad as Knut Bakke
- Marius Eriksen Jr. as Ola Bervik
- Joachim Holst-Jensen as Joachim Tønnesen
- Jytte Ibsen as Mette Werner
- Guri Stormoen as Alvilde Tønnesen
- Per Asplin as a singing voice
- Nora Brockstedt as a singing voice
- Fredrik Conradi as a singing voice
- Oddvar Sanne as a singing voice
- Sølvi Wang as a singing voice
- Liv Wilse as a singer
