= Øyvind Vennerød =

Norwegian film director and producer

- Born: 22 July 1919; Kristiania, Norway
- Died: 27 September 1991 (aged 72)
- Occupations: Film director and producer
- Children: Petter Vennerød

Øyvind Vennerød (22 July 1919 – 27 September 1991) was a Norwegian film director and producer. He was born in Kristiania, and was the father of Petter Vennerød.

== Filmography ==
- 1959: Støv på hjernen
- 1960: Millionær for en aften
- 1961: Sønner av Norge
- 1964: Alle tiders kupp
- 1965: To på topp
- 1969: Himmel og helvete
