= Bjørnepatruljen =

1956 film

- Directed by: Carsten Byhring
- Written by: Carsten Byhring; Gunnar Kaspersen
- Starring: Carsten Byhring; Dan Fosse; Einar Vaage; Jannike Falk; Bente Lindbeck
- Release date: 24 March 1956
- Running time: 48 minutes
- Country: Norway
- Language: Norwegian

Bjørnepatruljen (English: The Bear Patrol) is a 1956 Norwegian family film written and directed by, and starring Carsten Byhring, as well as Dan Fosse, Einar Vaage, Jannike Falk and Bente Lindbeck. The film is about a scout patrol on vacation who encounter a group of thieves on the run.

== Plot ==
Journeying through 1957, the year Bergman released two of his most acclaimed features (The Seventh Seal and Wild Strawberries), made a TV film and directed four plays for theatre, Magnusson has amassed a wealth of archive and contemporary interviews, along with a fantastic selection of clips from his vast body of work.
