= Eva Ramm =

Norwegian writer (1925–2026)

- Born: 23 November 1925; Bergen, Norway
- Died: 7 April 2026 (aged 100)
- Occupations: Psychologist; essayist; novelist; children's writer
- Known for: Inspiration for Støv på hjernen

Eva Ramm (23 November 1925 – 7 April 2026) was a Norwegian psychologist, essayist, novelist and children's author.

== Background ==
Born in Bergen, Ramm was married twice, first to Wilhelm Ernst Ramm, and second time to Trygve Alfarnæs.

== Career ==
Ramm made her literary debut in 1958 with the novel Med støv på hjernen ("With dust on the brain"). The novel was translated into several languages, and was basis for the successful film Støv på hjernen in 1959, as well as a Danish remake from 1961. She went on to write other crime novels.

She wrote 22 books, and edited the magazine Sykepleien ("Nursing") from 1973 to 1977. She advocated the theory of a plural ego in her 1995 book Det plurale jeg. Normalt å være spaltet?, and wrote other books on religion and psychiatry.

== Partial bibliography ==
- Med støv på hjernen ("With dust on the brain"), 1958
- Engel på vidvanke ("Angel on a whim"), 1962
- Kvinnekall og mannefall ("Feminine and masculine"), 1965
- Noe må gjøres ("Something has to be done") (for young people), 1968
- Mors tre hoder ("Mother's three heads"), 1973
- Ærlig talt ("Frankly") (for young people), 1975
- Fra tro til virkelighet (From belief to reality"), 1976
- Kjære Sokrates ("Dear Socrates"), 1981
- Elskeren Jeshua ("The lover Jeshua"), 1985
- Skynd deg, min elskede ("Hurry, my beloved"), 1986
- Mord i prestens hage ("Murder in the priest's garden"), 1992
- Det plurale jeg. Normalt å være spaltet? ("The plural I. Normally to be split?"), 1995
- Psykiatri til å bli gal av ("Psychiatry to drive you crazy"), 2002
- Livssyn uten religion ("View of life without religion"), 2008
