= Åsta Hjelm =

Norwegian composer and lyricist

- Born: December 21, 1919; Horten, Norway
- Died: April 4, 2003 (aged 86); Larvik, Norway
- Occupations: Composer and lyricist

Gerd Åsta Hjelm Arnesen (December 21, 1919 – April 4, 2003) was a Norwegian composer and lyricist. She wrote a number of Lille Grethe's hits, including "Teddyen min" (My Teddy). Hjelm also wrote songs for other artists, such as "Brevet jeg aldri sendte" (The Letter I Never Sent) for Åse Wentzel and "Flyktningegutten" (The Refugee Boy) for Harald Dyrkorn. She was appointed honorary ambassador of Horten in 1997.

== Filmography ==
- 1957: Selv om de er små
- 1957: Far til fire og onkel Sofus as Karin, Lille Grete's mother
