= Arne Bang-Hansen =

Norwegian actor

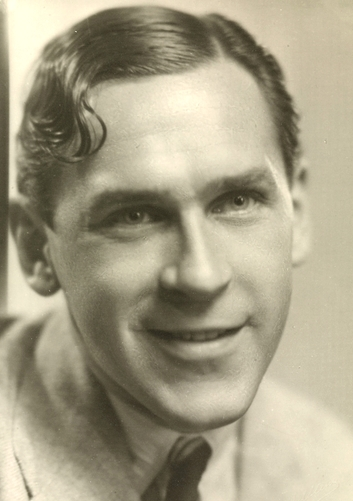
- Born: September 8, 1911; Kristiania (now Oslo), Norway
- Died: February 23, 1990 (aged 78)
- Occupation: Actor

Arne Bang-Hansen (September 8, 1911 – February 23, 1990) was a Norwegian actor that performed at the National Theater in Oslo for many years.

== Acting career ==
Arne Bang-Hansen played a total of 155 roles at the National Theater, where he worked from 1932 to 1982. For many, he is better known as the voice actor for Chief of Police Bastian in the audiobook version of Thorbjørn Egner's When the Robbers Came to Cardamom Town. Many also know him from the role of Professor Slatters in the TV series Brødrene Dal og spektralsteinene (The Dal Brothers and the Spectral Stones).

At the National Theater, Bang-Hansen already made a name for himself as a student in August Strindberg's To Damascus. In addition to the National Theater, he was at times employed at venues such as the National Theater in Bergen (1934–1938), Carl Johan Theater (1941–1945), Central Theater (1945–1948), and Trøndelag Theater (1948–1949). After that he worked again at the National Theater from 1948 until his death. His moody comedy art came to fruition in Holberg comedies such as Henrich og Pernille and as Styver in Henrik Ibsen's Love's Comedy. He proved to be an astute humanist in the role of Gibbs in T. S. Eliot's The Cocktail Party, Leonid in Anton Chekhov's The Cherry Orchard, and Kroll in Ibsen's Rosmersholm. One must also mention his role as the lecturing monkey in Franz Kafka's monologue "A Report to an Academy." In his farewell role, he played the concierge in Macbeth by William Shakespeare.

Bang-Hansen also appeared in several films; among them he played the lead roles in Hu Dagmar (1939) and Alle tiders kupp (1964). He had supporting roles in films such as Kasserer Jensen (1954), Støv på hjernen (1959), and Sønner av Norge (1961). On television, he is remembered for his role as Professor Slatters in the series Brødrene Dal og spektralsteinene in 1982, and as the groom's father in the episode "Hjem, kjære hjem" (Home, Dear Home) from 1981 in the Norwegian comedy series Fleksnes Fataliteter.

Arne Bang-Hansen received the Order of St. Olav for his achievements as an actor.

== Personal relationships ==
Arne Bang-Hansen was openly gay, and he described his life in his autobiography Fra mitt skjeve hjørne (From My Queer Corner) in 1985.

== Filmography ==
- 1934: Sangen om Rondane as Greta's brother Arne
- 1939: Hu Dagmar as Sjur
- 1953: Brudebuketten as Stockholmsfarer
- 1953: Skøytekongen
- 1954: Kasserer Jensen as the ferryman
- 1955: Den standhaftige tinnsoldat as the narrator
- 1959: Støv på hjernen
- 1960: Millionær for en aften as the commercial director of the Phoenix Theater
- 1961: Sønner av Norge as Baltzersen, a tax official
- 1962: Sønner av Norge kjøper bil as Baltzersen, a tax official
- 1964: Alle tiders kupp as Teodor Halvorsen, a writer
- 1969: An-Magritt as Filip Degn
- 1969: Himmel og helvete as chief physician Trosdahl
- 1970: Skal vi leke gjemsel? as the station master
- 1975: Skraphandlerne as Uncle Arne
- 1978: Autumn Sonata as Uncle Otto
- 1979: Lucie as Pastor Brandt
- 1982: Leve sitt liv as Hilmar
- 1985: Smugglarkungen as Slemdal

== Television ==
- 1973: Benoni og Rosa (NRK Television Theater)
- 1978: Twigs (miniseries) (NRK Television Theater)
- 1979: Ridder Runde og hans kamp mot drager og baroner as Sir Enebær, Skippo, and Skjære
- 1980: Herfra til Haglemoen as Colonel Flammerød
- 1981: "Fleksnes Hjem, kjære hjem" as the groom's father
- 1982: Brødrene Dal og spektralsteinene as Professor Slatters
