= Bjørg Engh =

Norwegian actress (1932–2009)

- Born: June 4, 1932; Oslo, Norway
- Died: December 21, 2009 (aged 77); Oslo, Norway
- Occupation: Actress

Bjørg Engh (June 4, 1932 – December 21, 2009) was a Norwegian actress from Oslo.

== Career ==
Engh acted in several films. In 1958 she played the role of Sonja, Bernhard's wife, in De dødes tjern. Later she appeared in films such as Klokker i måneskinn and television series such as Skipper Worse. Engh also performed at the National Theater in Oslo in performances of Marcel Aymé's Clérambard in 1960 and Elektra in 1964.

== Filmography ==
- 1958: De dødes tjern as Sonja, Bernhard's wife
- 1964: Klokker i måneskinn as the maid
- 1965: Smeltedigelen (TV) as Mercy Lewis
- 1966: Lille Lord Fauntleroy (TV) as Lady Fauntleroy
