= Liv Wilse =

Norwegian actress and singer (1931–1994)

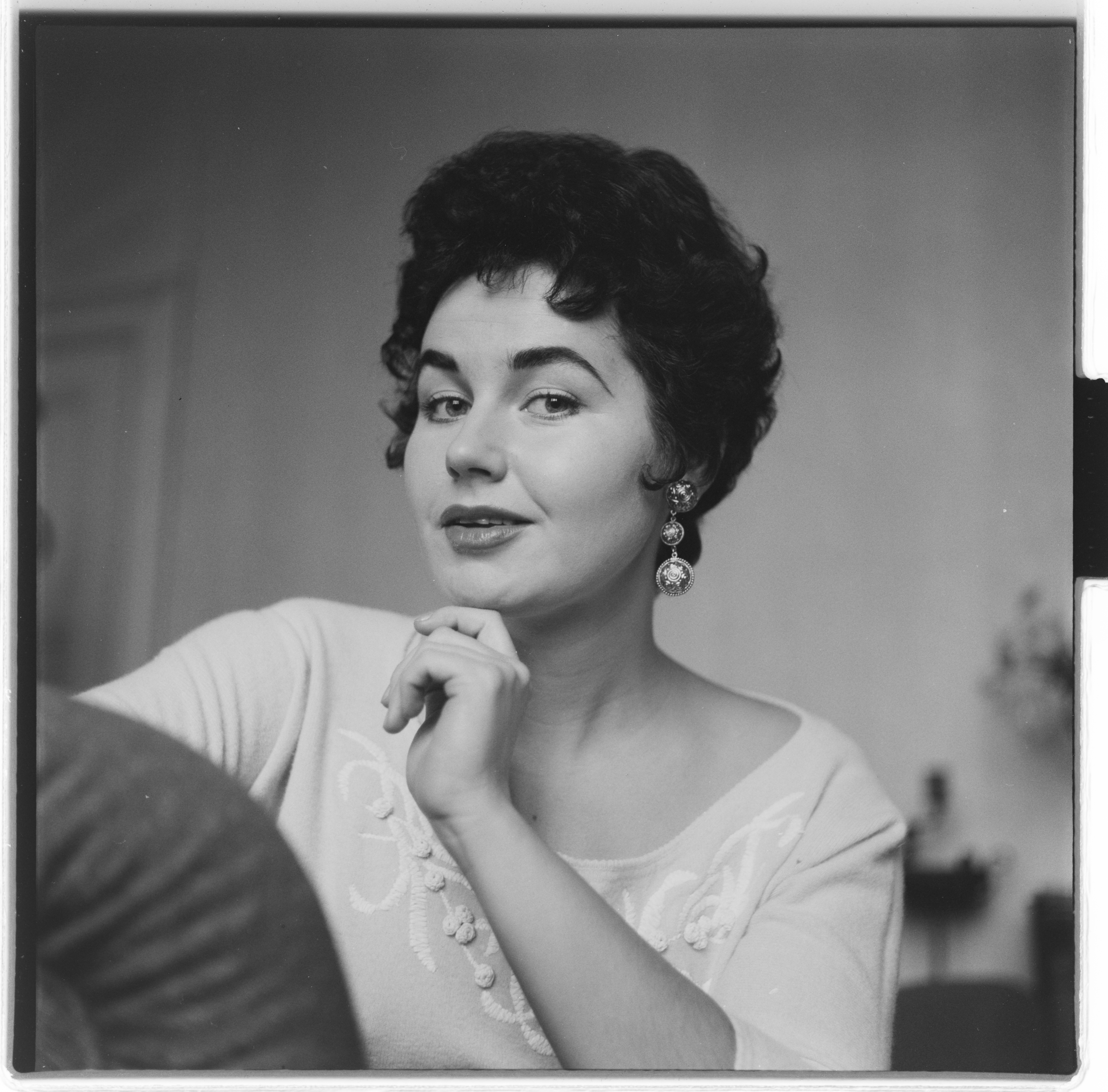
- Liv Wilse (Liv Opsahl) in 1954
- Born: May 27, 1931
- Died: August 17, 1994 (aged 63)
- Occupations: Actress, singer
- Spouse: Arve Opsahl

Liv Wilse (née Liv Ingebrigtsen, May 27, 1931 – August 17, 1994) was a Norwegian actress and singer. In the 1950s, she was briefly married to Arve Opsahl and was known as Liv Opsahl; she and Opsahl had a daughter together, Line Janiche Opsahl. She then married Anders Beer Wilse (1930–1990), with whom she ran a photography business.

In the film Troll i ord she performed the song "Elskling" (melody: Jocke Johanson, lyrics: Egil Hagen, arranged by: Egil Monn-Iversen). The song was also recorded by Liv Opsahl with an orchestra conducted by Øivind Bergh, and it was released on the 78-rpm disc Musica A 5009.

== Filmography ==
- 1954: Troll i ord
- 1954: Kasserer Jensen
- 1955: Arthurs forbrytelse
- 1957: Peter van Heeren
- 1957: Selv om de er små
- 1958: Bustenskjold
- 1959: Støv på hjernen

== Television (Swedish) ==
- 1990: Den svarta cirkeln
