= Per G. Jonson =

Norwegian cinematographer and ski jumper

Per Jonson
- Born: April 11, 1910; Kristiania, Norway
- Died: October 16, 1975 (aged 65)
- Occupations: Filmmaker, ski jumper, cinematographer, film editor, photographer
- Years active: 1934–1968

Per Gunnar Jonson (11 April 1910 – 16 October 1975) was a Norwegian cinematographer and ski jumper.

== Cinematography ==
Jonson shot a short film about skiing in Karpathos, which impressed German director Leni Riefenstahl, and she hired him as an assistant director for the 1936 Winter Olympics in Garmisch-Partenkirchen. He primarily worked as a cinematographer on Norwegian films, in addition to occasionally working as a director and producer. At the end of his career he established his own film production company.

== Ski jumping ==
In 1934, Per Jonson participated in an international competition at the Bloudek Giant in Planica, making a jump 80 meters (260 ft) long. In another jump, outside the competition, he landed at 88.5 meters (290 ft) with a fall.

His was one of the best ski jumpers of his time, competing together with legends such as Birger Ruud and his brother Sigmund Ruud. In 1933, he coached the Polish national ski jumping team in Zakopane.

== Filmography ==
- 1939: De vergeløse
- 1939: Valfångare
- 1939: Gjest Baardsen
- 1940: Vildmarkens sång
- 1940: Mannen som alla ville mörda
- 1940: Tante Pose
- 1941: Kjærlighet og vennskap
- 1941: Gullfjellet
- 1946: Englandsfarere
- 1947: Sankt Hans fest
- 1947: 5 år – som vi så dem
- 1948: Trollfossen
- 1949: Svendsen går videre
- 1950: Marianne på sykehus, short film
- 1950: Oslo 24 timer av byens liv
- 1951: Flukten fra Dakar
- 1951: Skadeskutt
- 1951: Kranes konditori
- 1952: Trine!
- 1952: Nødlanding
- 1953: Selkvinnen
- 1954: Heksenetter
- 1954: Selkvinnen
- 1954: Shetlandsgjengen
- 1954: Savnet siden mandag
- 1955: Hjem går vi ikke
- 1956: Kvinnens plass
- 1956: Roser til Monica
- 1957: Peter van Heeren
- 1957: Smuglere i smoking
- 1958: Selv om de er små
- 1958: I slik en natt
- 1958: På slaget åtte
- 1959: Hete septemberdager, producer
- 1959: Ugler i mosen, producer
- 1961: Vår i Skandinavia, short advertising film
- 1964: Marenco
- 1968: Planica, juče, danas, sutra ..., short film from Yugoslavia
