= Vi gifter oss =

- Directed by: Nils R. Müller
- Written by: Nils R. Müller
- Produced by: Knut Yran
- Starring: Henki Kolstad; Inger Marie Andersen
- Cinematography: Finn Bergan
- Edited by: Olav Engebretsen
- Music by: Jolly Kramer-Johansen
- Release date: 1951
- Running time: 103 minutes
- Country: Norway
- Language: Norwegian

Vi gifter oss (We're Getting Married) is a Norwegian black-and-white film from 1951 directed by Nils R. Müller. Müller also wrote the screenplay for the film. The film starred Henki Kolstad and Inger Marie Andersen.

== Plot ==
It is summer and the composer Petter Gran is on vacation when he suddenly hears a scream from Miss Hermansen. The brakes on her bicycle fail, and she ends up in the water. He helps her out of the water, but the bicycle is broken and so they continue spending the summer together. They return to Oslo and soon afterwards get engaged. She is introduced to Petter's parents. His mother is not enthusiastic about her, but his father welcomes her into the family.

The couple soon get married. They have difficulty finding their own place to live, and so they have to live with Petter's parents. His mother's dislike of Kari eventually becomes such a big problem that the couple is forced to move to Kari's former apartment. However, they have bought a site where they are building a house, and every Sunday they work frenetically to finish the building. Kari gets pregnant, and when the landlady learns about this she forces the couple to move. The house is not finished, so they have to rent rooms in Mrs. Rønne's house at an exorbitant price.

Their house is almost finished when a building inspector pays a visit. He says they cannot move in because they do not have a building permit for the house. The couple have already canceled their lease for Mrs. Rønne's room, so they cannot stay there. Instead, they rent a dilapidated place to stay on a farm far out of town. Petter needs money and signs up for a song competition. Initially he fails to compose anything, but when he sees some swallows sitting on a telephone line it comes to him. The swallows look like notes on a staff, and suddenly he knows what the tune should be. Petter submits his contribution to the competition and at the same time he and his wife receive the building permit to complete the house. Many people visit on the day they move in, and when they turn on the radio they hear Petter's song "What Was Life without You?" which won the competition.

== Cast ==
- Henki Kolstad as Petter Gran
- Inger Marie Andersen as Kari Hermansen
- Nanna Stenersen as Babben
- Lars Nordrum as Einar
- Erna Schøyen as Mrs. Gran
- Henny Skjønberg as Miss Tangen
- Eugen Skjønberg as Mr. Gran
- Sonja Mjøen as Mrs. Rønne
- Edvard Drabløs as Hansen
- Jack Fjeldstad as a song composer
- Margit Brataas as Hansen's housekeeper
- Haakon Arnold as an agent
- Lauritz Falk
- Ingebjørg Sem as the nurse (uncredited)

== Song ==
"Hva var vel livet uten deg?" (What Was Life without You?) was the film's signature song. The music was written by the Swedish composer Ernfrid Ahlin and the lyrics were written by the Norwegian lyricist Gunnar Kaspersen. In the film it is sung by Henki Kolstad and Astrid Herseth. Herseth's voice was dubbed for that of Inger Marie Andersen. Arne Sveen, Jens Book-Jenssen, and Aage Braarud sang in the version of the song released on vinyl.
