= To på topp =

- Directed by: Øyvind Vennerød
- Written by: Øyvind Vennerød; Jørn Ording
- Starring: Rolf Just Nilsen; Inger Marie Andersen; Odd Borg; Lille Grethe Kausland; Alf Malland; Kari Simonsen; Henki Kolstad
- Cinematography: Hans Nord
- Edited by: Øyvind Vennerød
- Music by: Bjarne Amdahl
- Distributed by: Ara-Film AS
- Release date: August 30, 1965
- Running time: 82 minutes
- Country: Norway
- Language: Norwegian

To på topp (Two on Top) is a Norwegian feature film from 1965. It was directed by Øyvind Vennerød, who also wrote the script together with Jørn Ording. It is a comedy about pop music. The film stars Rolf Just Nilsen. The cast also included the Oslo band the Beatnicks, with guitarist Freddy Lindquist and vocalist Kåre Haugen among others. The film music was composed by Bjarne Amdahl.

The film's theme song, performed by the Beatniks, was "Jeg husker den gangen jeg var i Buenos Aires!!" (I Remember the Time I Was in Buenos Aires!!).

== Plot ==
The ordinary seaman Nils, played by Rolf Just Nilsen, is mistaken for the pop singer Dickie Dons, also played by Rolf Just Nilsen, on board the car ferry from Kiel to Oslo. Nils quickly settles into his new role and is delighted to be able to drink champagne with the captain. However, it becomes more difficult as time goes on—not least because Dickie Dons turns out to be secretly married to his secretary.

== Cast ==
- Rolf Just Nilsen as Nils Nilsen and Dickie Dons
- Inger Marie Andersen as Miss Evelyn
- Odd Borg as August Knappen
- Lille Grethe Kausland as Mette, a fan
- Alf Malland as an extortioner
- Kari Simonsen as Vera Schultz, Dickie's girlfriend
- Henki Kolstad as Captain Madsen
- Bjarne Thomsen as a galley boy
- Ole Hammerstrøm as an extortioner
- Willie Hoel as the cook
- Dan Fosse as a galley boy
- Arne Aas as the chief mate
