= Olav Engebretsen =

Norwegian film editor and director

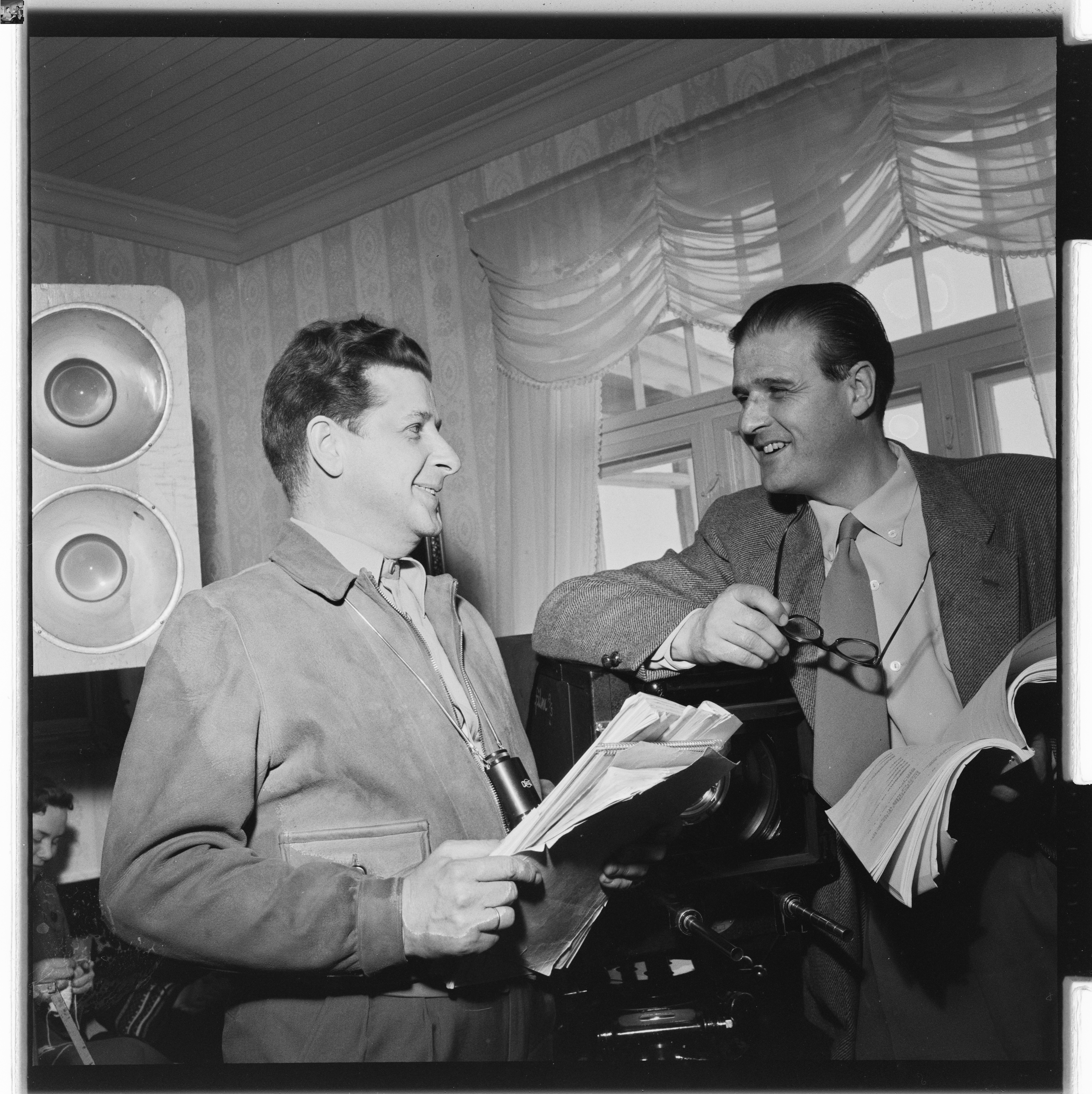
- Directors Olav Engebretsen (left) and Jon Lennart Mjøen during the filming of Troll i ord in 1954
- Born: December 25, 1905
- Died: March 30, 1988 (aged 82)
- Occupation(s): Film editor and director

Olav Engebretsen, also Olaf Engebretsen (December 25, 1905 – March 30, 1988) was a Norwegian film editor and director.

Engebretsen was primarily active as a film editor from 1941 to 1962. The films that he edited include Den forsvundne pølsemaker (1941), Jeg drepte!, (1942), and Line (1961). He received the Norwegian Film Critics Award (Filmkritikerprisen) in 1961 for his editing of Line. In 1954 he directed the films Troll i ord and I moralens navn.

Engebretsen is buried in the Cemetery of Our Saviour in Oslo.

== Filmography ==
=== Editor ===
- 1941: Den forsvundne pølsemaker
- 1942: Jeg drepte!
- 1942: Det æ'kke te å tru
- 1943: Vigdis
- 1943: Sangen til livet
- 1944: Kommer du, Elsa?
- 1946: Om kjærligheten synger de
- 1947: Sankt Hans fest
- 1948: Trollfossen
- 1949: I takt med tiden
- 1949: Jorden rundt på to timer
- 1951: Vi gifter oss
- 1951: Skadeskutt
- 1952: Haakon VII – Norges konge i krig og fred
- 1952: Andrine og Kjell
- 1952: De VI olympiske vinterleker Oslo 1952
- 1952: Jorden rundt på to timer
- 1952: Det kunne vært deg
- 1952: Trine!
- 1952: Vi vil skilles
- 1954: Kasserer Jensen
- 1956: Gylne ungdom
- 1957: Peter van Heeren
- 1957: Selv om de er små
- 1959: 5 loddrett
- 1961: Et øye på hver finger
- 1961: Line
- 1970: Skulle det dukke opp flere lik er det bare å ringe

=== Director ===
- 1954: Troll i ord
- 1954: I moralens navn
