= Anne Borg (dancer) =

Norwegian ballet dancer

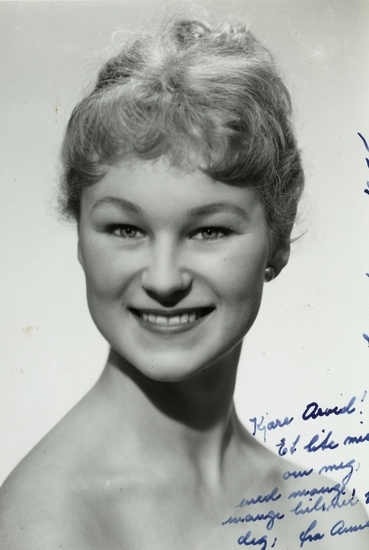
- Born: 28 September 1936; Oslo, Norway
- Died: 19 December 2016 (aged 80)
- Occupation: Ballet dancer
- Spouse: Odd Borg
- Awards: Order of St. Olav; Arts Council Norway Award

Anne Borg (née Nicolaisen; 28 September 1936 – 19 December 2016) was a Norwegian ballet dancer and choreographer.

She was appointed ballet director at the opera from 1970 to 1977, and a second period from 1983 to 1988. She served as rector at the Norwegian National Academy of Ballet from 1991 to 1995. In 1988 she was decorated Knight, First Class of the Order of St. Olav.

Borg received the Oslo City art award in 1978 and the Arts Council Norway Honorary Award in 2013.
