= De kalte ham Skarven =

- Directed by: Wilfred Breistrand; Erik Folke Gustavson
- Written by: Erik Folke Gustavson; Roar Petersen
- Starring: Per Christensen; Liv Ullmann
- Release date: 4 February 1965
- Running time: 85 minutes
- Country: Norway
- Language: Norwegian

De kalte ham Skarven (English: They Called Him Skarven) is a 1965 Norwegian drama film directed by Wilfred Breistrand and Erik Folke Gustavson, starring Per Christensen and Liv Ullmann. The film is about a fisherman who has to face judgement on his life after an accident.
