= Inger Marie Andersen =

Norwegian actress (1930–1995)

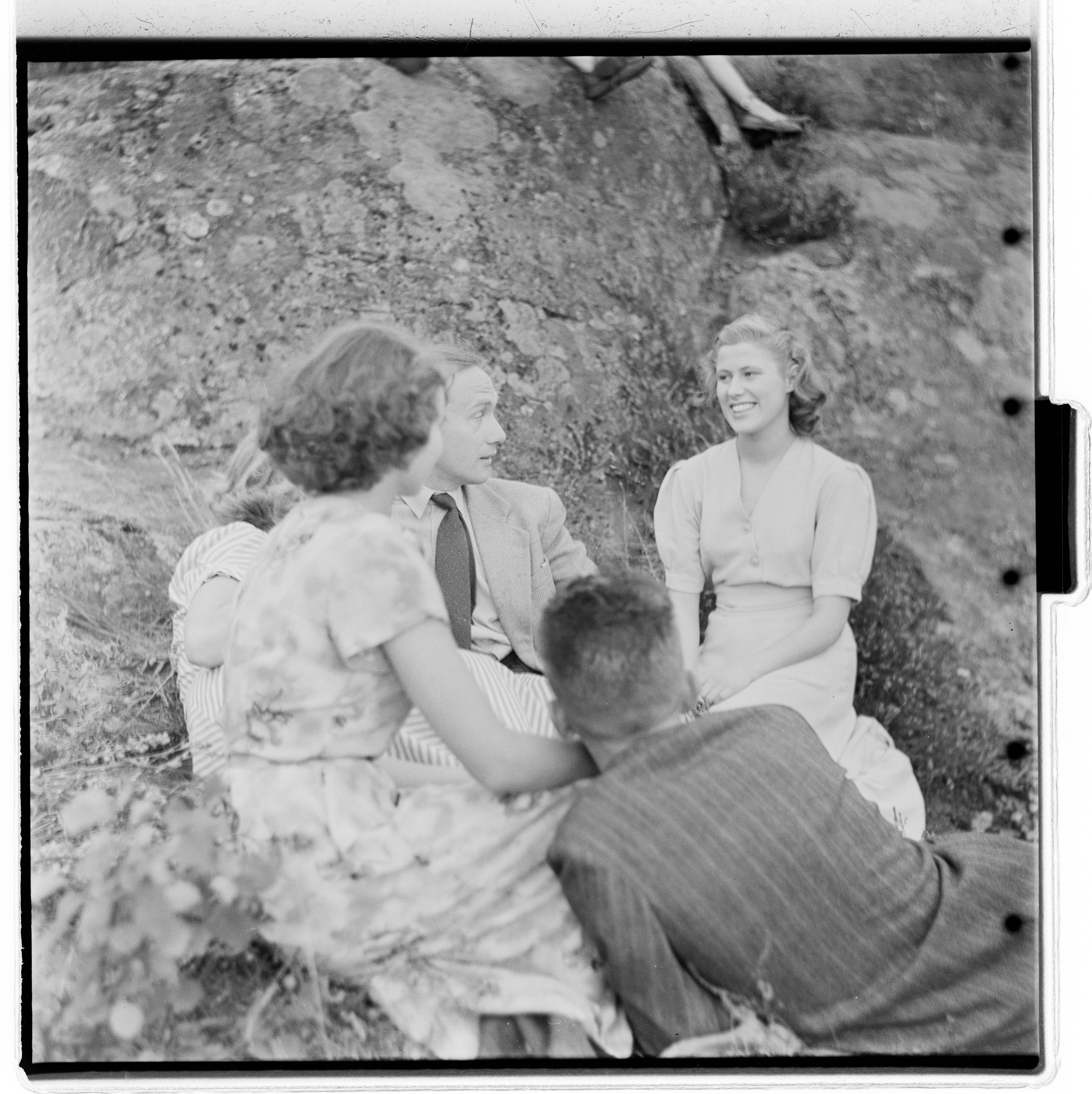
- Born: 25 November 1930; Glemmen, Norway
- Died: 29 April 1995 (aged 64); Bergen, Norway
- Occupation: Actress
- Years active: 1951–1982

Inger Marie Andersen (25 November 1930 – 29 April 1995) was a Norwegian actress who was the most popular female film star in her native country during the 1950s. Starring as both romantic and comedic leads, she appeared in 17 films, between 1951 and 1982. Her first film was as the leading actress in Nils R. Müller's critically lauded comedy Vi gifter oss (1951); which made her an instant celebrity. She was also a stage actress at the National Theatre in Oslo where she began her career in 1950. She starred in Stevnemøte med glemte år (1957), which was entered into the 7th Berlin International Film Festival. After the early 1960s, her film appearances became more sporadic and her fame diminished.

== Selected filmography ==
- Vi gifter oss (1951)
- Troll i ord (1954)
- Kvinnens plass (1956)
- Stevnemøte med glemte år (1957)
- Støv på hjernen (1959)
- Sønner av Norge (1961)
- To på topp (1965)
- Før frostnettene (1966)
- Vårnatt (1976)
