= Turid Balke =

Norwegian actress, playwright and artist

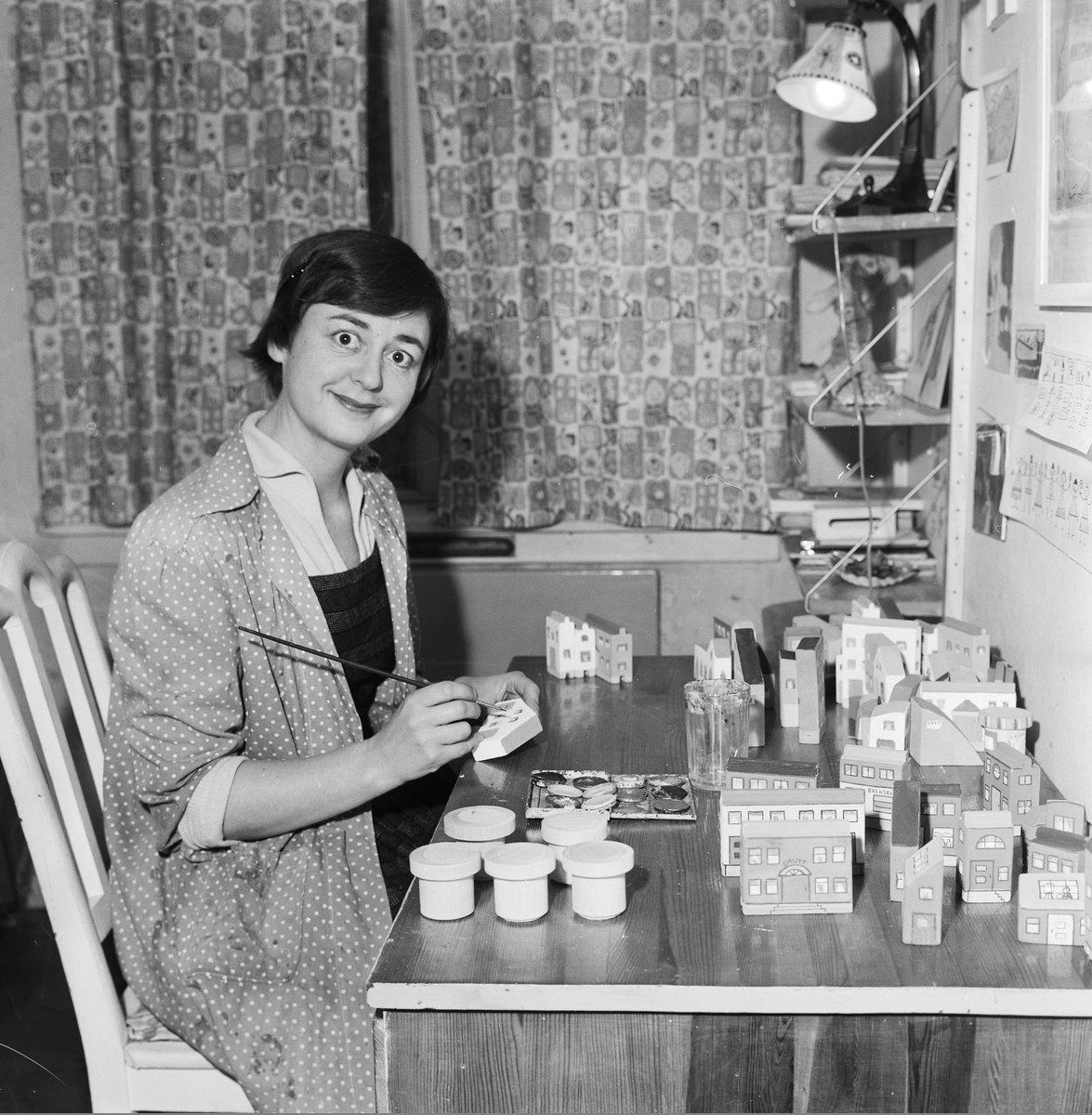
- Balke in 1958
- Born: 25 July 1921; Kirkenes, Norway
- Died: 5 January 2000 (aged 78); Oslo, Norway
- Occupations: Actress, playwright, artist
- Years active: 1949-2000
- Relatives: Peder Balke (great-grandfather)

Turid Balke (25 July 1921 – 5 January 2000) was a Norwegian actress, playwright and artist.

== Biography ==
Born in Kirkenes, she started her professional career at Trøndelag Teater in 1949. She would spend many of her years as an actress at Folketeatret and the famous Norwegian revue-stage Chat Noir. She was also an artist and a designer, even designing "proper" toys for children, but more importantly she would become one of the pioneers in Norwegian children's theatre. She wrote and staged several plays for children and is also remembered for creating Balkeby (Balke-town), a miniature-town with puppets and their stories performed by Balke.

Her first film appearance came as a secretary in the 1953-comedy Brudebuketten. Throughout the years she would appear in classic Norwegian films such as Støv på hjernen, (1959), its sequels Sønner av Norge and Sønner av Norge kjøper bil, and other popular titles like Olsenbanden for full musikk (1976) and Kamilla og tyven (1988). After close to 30 movies her film-career finished off on a high-note, appearing in a small but prominent role as the oracle woman in The 13th Warrior opposite Antonio Banderas. Balke admitted in an interview shortly after that for her, the greatest thrill was not working with Banderas but meeting his co-star, Omar Sharif.

Balke also had numerous roles on television, even gaining new fans in the sit-com Karl & Co, where she played the title-character's nosy old neighbour from 1998 to 1999.

In 1974 she received the Norwegian Arts Council's award for her illustrations to the children's book Det begynte en fredag i Finvik.

Known for her characteristic bulging eyes, Balke lived in Oslo throughout most of her life and kept active until her sudden death in 2000, at the age of 78.

Her great-grandfather was famous Norwegian painter Peder Balke.
