= Alle tiders kupp =

1964 film

- Directed by: Øyvind Vennerød
- Written by: Øyvind Vennerød; Jørn Ording
- Starring: Rolf Just Nilsen; Arne Bang-Hansen; Henki Kolstad; Inger Marie Andersen
- Release date: 17 August 1964
- Running time: 87 minutes
- Country: Norway
- Language: Norwegian

Alle tiders kupp is a 1964 Norwegian comedy film directed by Øyvind Vennerød, starring Rolf Just Nilsen, Arne Bang-Hansen, Henki Kolstad and Inger Marie Andersen. Three men rob an outlet of the government owned alcoholic beverage retailer Vinmonopolet. They then run into problems getting rid of the 50,000 bottles of liquor they have stolen.
