= Carsten Byhring =

Norwegian actor (1918–1990)

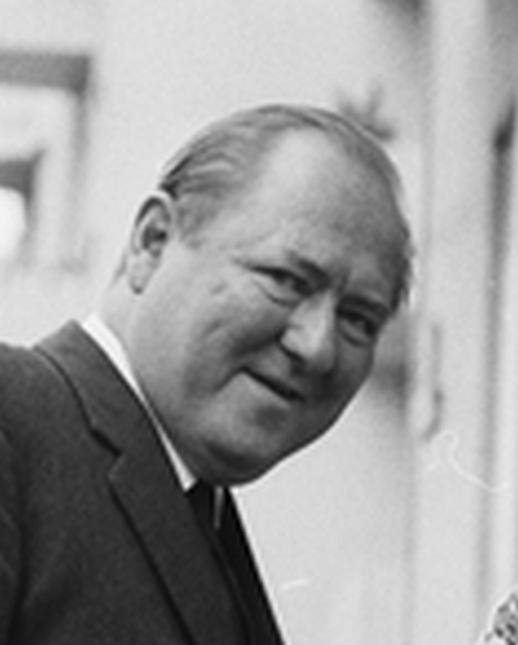
- Carsten Byhring i 1967
- Born: 8 December 1918
- Died: 5 April 1990 (aged 71)
- Resting place: Vestre gravlund
- Spouse(s): Ingerid Vardund
- Awards: King's Medal of Merit in Gold

Carsten Byhring (8 December 1918 – 5 April 1990) was a Norwegian actor. He is probably best known for playing Kjell in the Olsen Gang movies. He is the brother of actor Svein Byhring.

He died from cancer in Oslo at the age of 71, in 1990.

== Selected filmography ==
- 1949: Svendsen går videre
- 1955: Hjem går vi ikke
- 1956: Bjørnepatruljen
- 1959: The Chasers
- 1963: Freske fraspark
- 1966: Før frostnettene
- 1966: Hurra for Andersens!
- 1967: Musikanter
- 1968: Smuglere
- 1968: Sus og dus på by'n
- 1970: Skulle det dukke opp flere lik er det bare å ringe
- 1972: Lukket avdeling
- 1974: Bobby's War
- 1974: Ungen
- 1977: Kosmetikkrevolusjonen
