= Gustav Adolf Hegh =

Norwegian actor

Gustav Adolf Hegh (22 October 1927 – 18 November 2010) was a Norwegian actor.

He was born in Oslo. He made his stage debut at Sommerteatret in 1953, and was employed at Chat Noir from 1954 to 1963, Rogaland Teater from 1968 to 1972 and then Riksteatret. Between 1963 and 1968 he was a freelancer in Norway and abroad.
