= Henki Kolstad =

Norwegian actor (1915–2008)

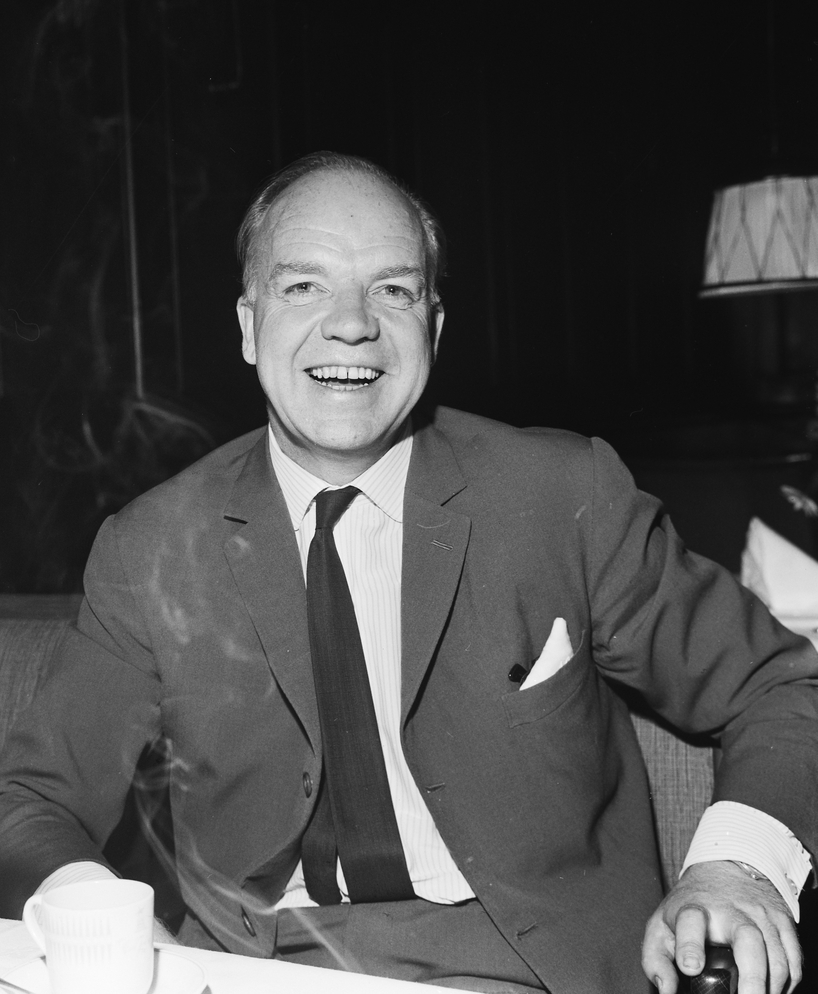
- Henki Kolstad (1964)
- Born: 3 February 1915; Kristiania, Norway
- Died: 14 July 2008 (aged 93); Oslo, Norway
- Years active: 1928–2001
- Spouse: Else Kolstad (1938–2008)

Henki Kolstad (3 February 1915 – 14 July 2008) was a Norwegian actor and pop-cultural national treasure. With his debut at the Oslo national theater, he was known for his appearances in Olsenbanden, the children's series Jul i Skomakergata, Herr Klinke in Den Spanske Flue, and Vi gifter oss. Notable mentions include the Amanda and the Order of St. Olav awards.

Kolstad and his wife Else were together for 76 years. They had one son and two daughters.

Henki was also known for voicing several local Disney characters such as the Sheriff of Nottingham in Robin Hood, Grumpy in the 1982 dub of Snow White and the Seven Dwarfs, Maurice in Beauty and the Beast and the Sultan of Agrabah in Aladdin.

Henki's younger brother, Lasse Kolstad, was also a well-known actor. His older brother Knut Kolstad was a politician.

== Selected filmography ==
- 1930: Eskimo
- 1932: The White God
- 1943: Vigdis
- 1948: Kampen om tungtvannet
- 1949: Svendsen går videre
- 1950: To mistenkelige personer as a tramp
- 1951: Alt dette og Island med
- 1951: Vi gifter oss
- 1952: Emergency Landing
- 1954: Troll i ord
- 1957: Selv om de er små
- 1957: Stevnemøte med glemte år
- 1958: De dødes tjern
- 1959: 5 loddrett
- 1960: Millionær for en aften
- 1961: Et øye på hver finger
- 1961: Line
- 1963: Freske fraspark
- 1963: Vildanden
- 1964: Pappa tar gull
- 1965: Skjær i sjøen
- 1965: To på topp
- 1967: Gutten som kappåt med trollet
- 1967: Musikanter as Bille, the ship owner
- 1974: Fleksnes Fataliteter: Trafikk og panikk (#2.6) (TV)
- 1979: Jul i Skomakergata (TV)
- 1985: Deilig er fjorden!
- 1986: Teodors Julekalender (TV)
- 1988: Folk og røvere i Kardemomme by
- 1990: Spanske flue, Den (TV)
- 1999: Olsenbandens siste stikk
