= Nils R. Müller =

Norwegian film director (1921–2007)

- Born: 17 January 1921; Shanghai, China
- Died: 6 March 2007 (aged 86); Oslo, Norway
- Occupation: Film director
- Years active: 1946-1975

Nils R. Müller (17 January 1921 – 6 March 2007) was a Norwegian film director.

He was born in Shanghai. His debut was Så møtes vi imorgen (1946), and he broke through with the comedy Vi gifter oss (1951). Later films include Vi vil skilles (1952), Skøytekongen (1953), Kasserer Jensen (1954), Kvinnens plass (1956), Det store varpet (1960), Tonny (1962), Elskere (1963), Broder Gabrielsen (1966), De ukjentes marked (1968), and Min Marion (1975). Det store varpet was entered into the 2nd Moscow International Film Festival.

He directed 21 films in total, and was awarded the Amanda Committee's Honorary Award in 1996.

Nils R. Müller was the brother of the Stalag Luft III POW escapee Jens Müller.
