= Tore Foss =

Norwegian singer, actor and theatre director

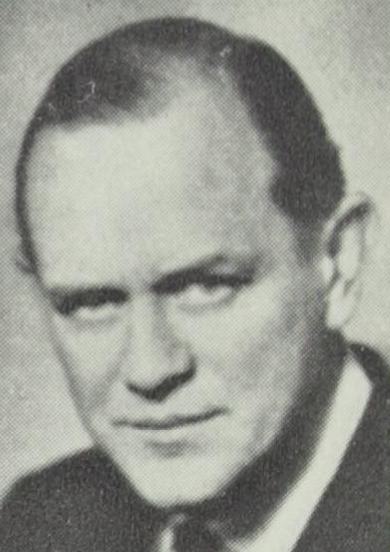
- Born: 21 February 1901
- Died: 6 August 1968

Tore Foss (21 February 1901 – 6 August 1968) was a Norwegian singer, actor and theatre director. He made his stage début at Chat Noir in 1927. He played at Balkongen from 1927 to 1928, and later worked for the National Theatre, Det Nye Teater, Centralteatret and Folketeatret. He participated in several films. Before his acting career, Foss had military training and became a reserve officer in the Norwegian Army. He married the actress Gunvor Hall in 1934.
