= Rolf Just Nilsen =

Norwegian singer and actor

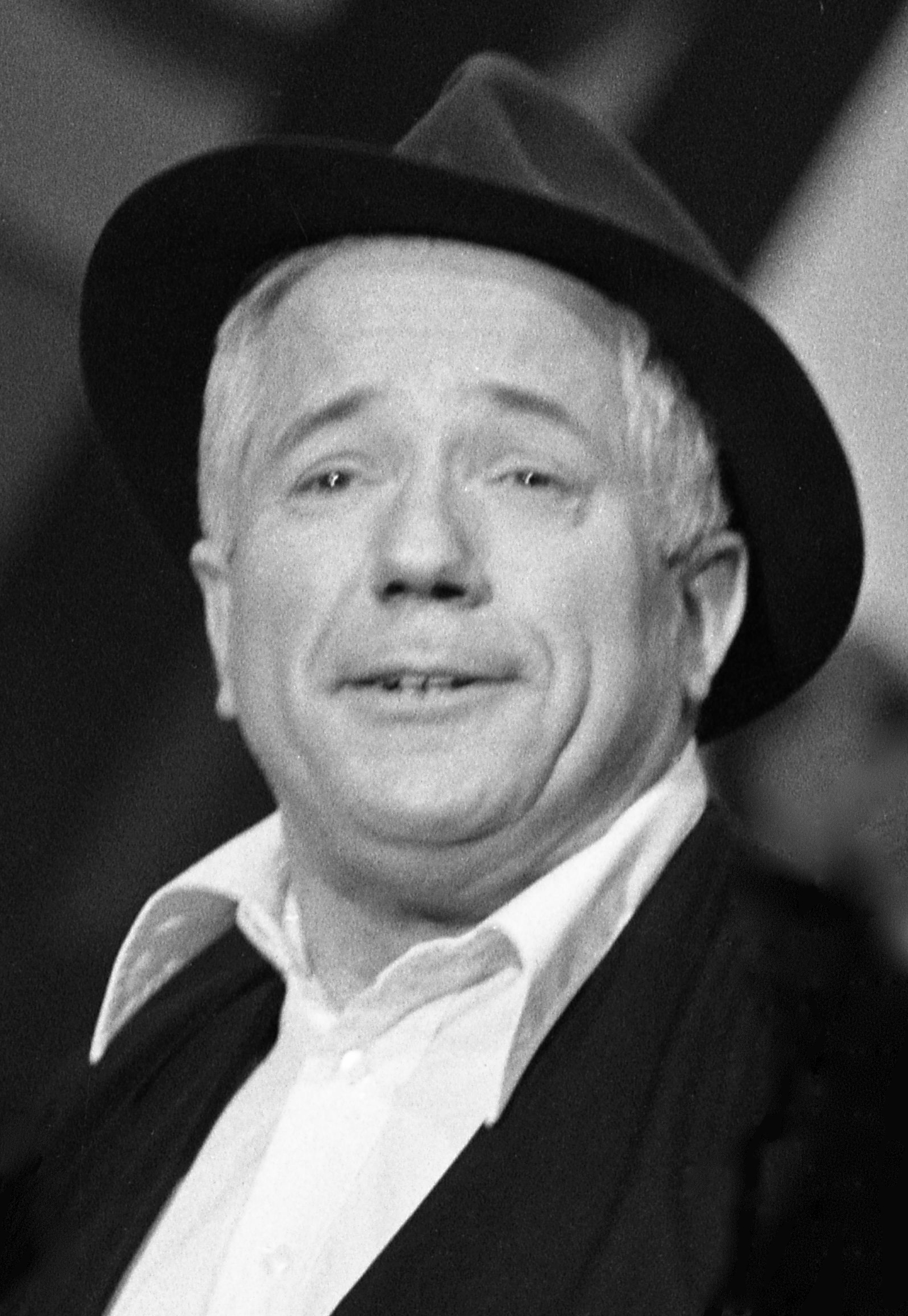

Background information
- Born: 31 August 1931
- Died: 9 May 1981 (aged 49)
- Instrument: vocals

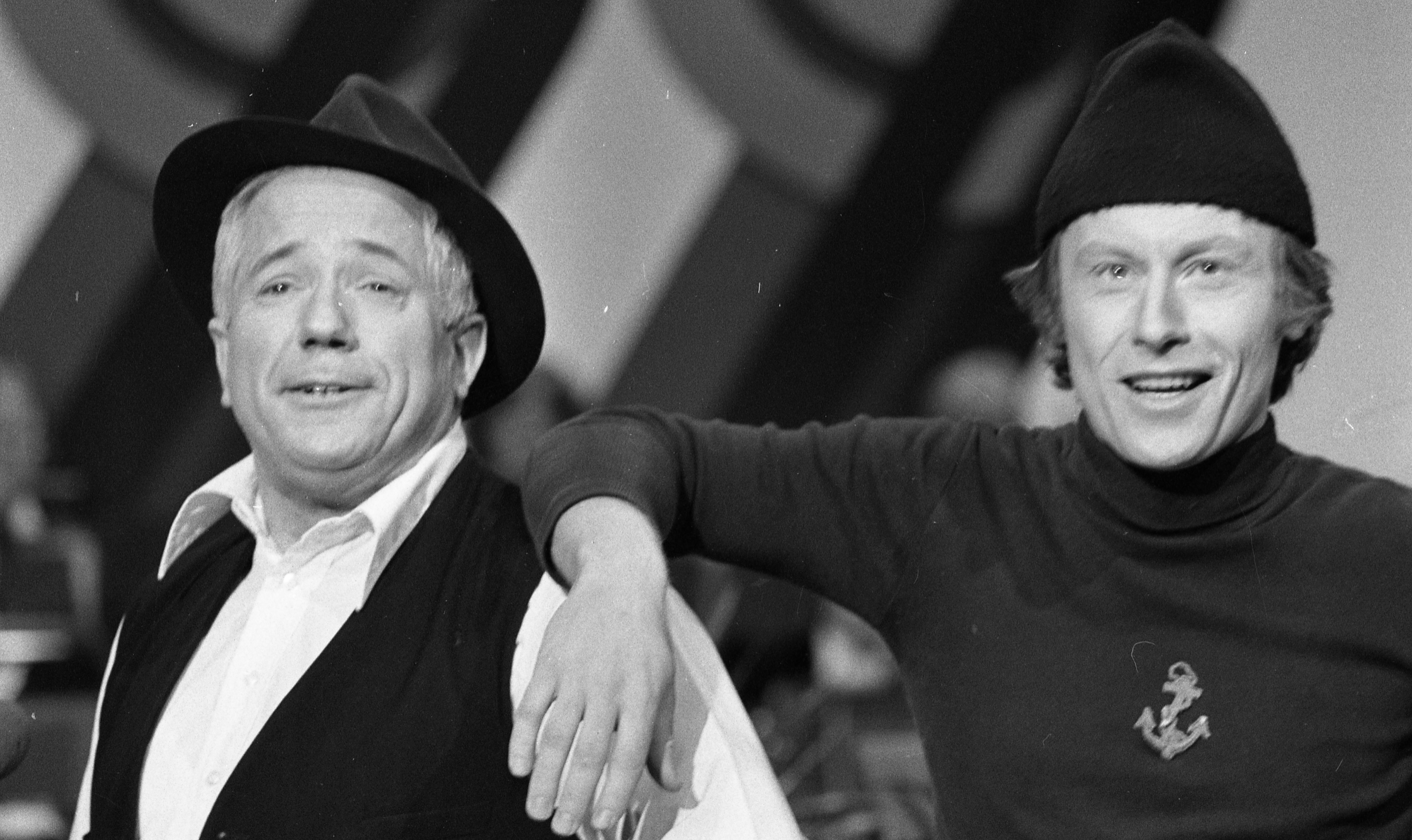
Rolf Just Nilsen (left) in 1980

Rolf Just Nilsen (31 August 1931 – 9 May 1981) was a Norwegian singer, impressionist and actor. He was particularly known for his imitations of famous comedians at the time. He worked for the theatres Studioteatret, Chat Noir, Edderkoppen Theatre, Oslo Nye Teater and Det Norske Teatret, and for radio and television.

== Personal life ==
Just Nilsen was born in Oslo as the son of Bjarne Olav Just Nilsen and Magnhild Herland. He was a nephew of actor Leif Juster. He married Arna Aukland) in 1954 and they had two children.

In the mid 1970s, Rolf had a heart attack and spent 6 weeks in hospital. Despite this, he did not decrease his work load. Rolf suffered another, this time fatal, heart attack on May 9, 1981, during a performance of the show L/L Wang & Nilsen, which he co-starred alongside Sølvi Wang, at Det Norske Teatret, Oslo. He was 49 years old at the time of his death.

== Career ==
Just Nilsen made his stage debut in 1947 at Studioteatret in the play Vintersolverv. He was assigned at Studioteatret until 1950, when he was called for military service. From 1952 to 1959 he worked at Chat Noir. His breakthrough was in Feldborg's "Operasangeren" in the 1958 revue Så lenge lykken varer.

From 1959 to 1965 he worked at the Edderkoppen Theatre, from 1965 to 1968 at Chat Noir, from 1968 to 1970 at Det Norske Teatret, from 1970 to 1976 at Oslo Nye Teater, and from 1976 to 1981 at Det Norske Teatret.

His film debut was in the 1958 film Bustenskjold, based on the comic strip Jens von Bustenskjold. He played the leading character in the film comedies Operasjon Løvsprett from 1962 and Operasjon Sjøsprøyt from 1964, and played in Stompa forelsker seg from 1965, To på topp from 1965 and Reisen til julestjernen from 1976.

Among his best known songs are "Pappa'n til Tove Mette" and "Julekveld i skogen". He was particularly known for his voice imitations, and recorded several monologues parodying leading Norwegian politicians. He recorded songs for children, including the album Superoptikjempefantafenomenalistisk from 1965. He recorded four albums for children from 1977 to 1980, and was awarded Spellemannprisen in 1980.

He was awarded the Leonard Statuette in 1976.
