= Willie Hoel =

Norwegian actor and comedian

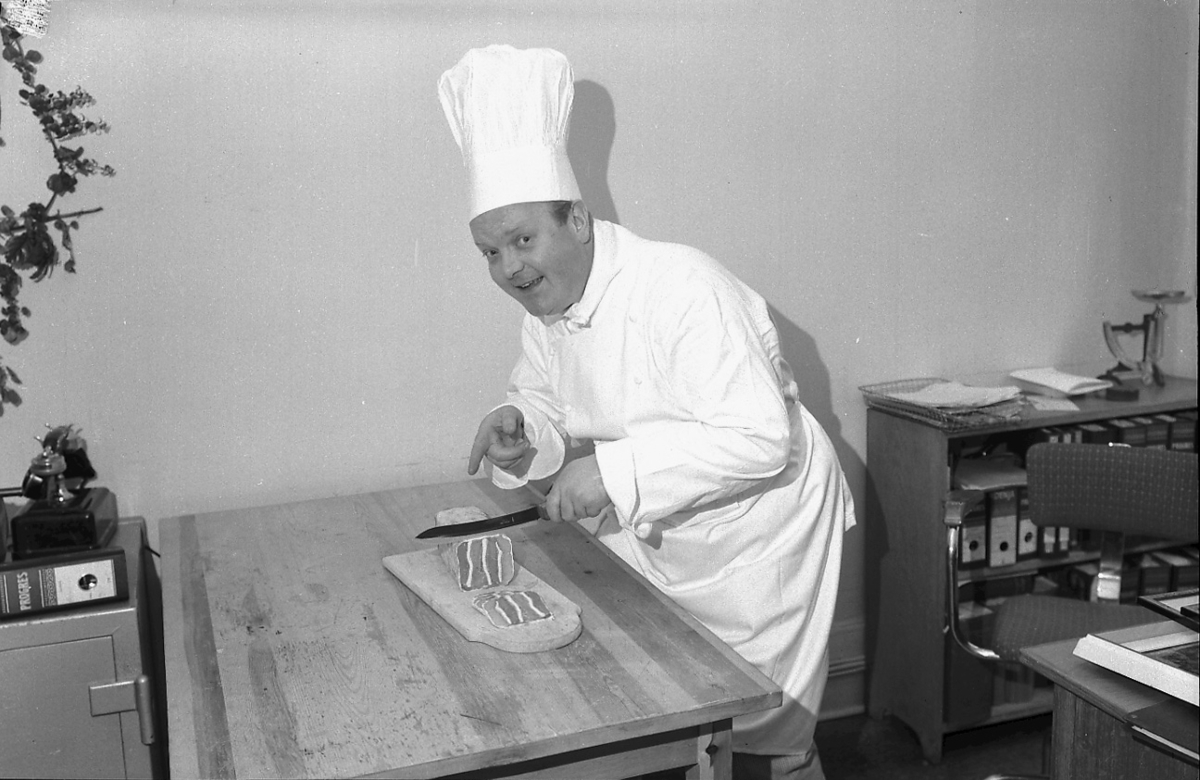
Willie Hoel in 1960

Willie Hans Karsten Hoel (16 June 1920 – 15 June 1986) was a Norwegian actor and comedian.

He is best known for on-stage performances and for numerous roles, mainly comedic, in Norwegian movies, including the Olsenbanden movies.
