= Ninas barn =

- Directed by: Nina Grünfeld
- Written by: Nina Grünfeld
- Produced by: Nina Grünfeld
- Cinematography: Torstein Nodland; Hilde Malme
- Edited by: Svein Olav Sandem
- Music by: Gaute Storaas
- Distributed by: Euforia Film
- Release date: September 24, 2015
- Running time: 66 minutes
- Country: Norway
- Language: Norwegian
- Budget: NOK 4.6 million

Ninas barn (Nina's Children) is a 2015 documentary film about the Jewish Children's Home in Oslo during the Second World War. The film was written and directed by Nina Grünfeld, and it was produced by her company Gründer Film. A book containing the story was also written by Espen Holm and Nina Grünfeld, and it was published by Kagge Forlag in 2015.

== Story ==
The Jewish Children's Home was located on Holtegata in the Homansbyen neighborhood of Oslo. A group of Austrian Jewish children had been invited by Nansen Relief to Norway for a summer camp, and they arrived in the summer of 1938. While they were staying in Norway, the situation for Jews in Austria became increasingly difficult, and the parents were offered to let the children stay in Norway. Fourteen children remained in Norway. The German-Russian child psychologist Nina Hasvoll (1910–1999) was persuaded to start an orphanage where the refugee children could be cared for. When the German occupation authorities began arresting Jewish residents in the fall of 1942, the orphanage manager received a tip that the children she was responsible for were in great danger. They had to be smuggled out of the country and into Sweden. She received help from a number of people to carry out the rescue operation. All fourteen children at the orphanage were rescued and transferred to Sweden.

Seven of those that helped bring the children to safety were honored in 2006 by being named Righteous Among the Nations. These seven were Sigrid Helliesen Lund, Gerda Tanberg, Martin Solvang, Ola Rauken, Ola Breisjøberget, Nina Hasvoll, and Nic Waal. Filmmaker Nina Grünfeld's father, the psychiatrist Berthold Grünfeld, was one of the refugee children saved in this operation. In gratitude to Nina Hasvoll, he later named his daughter after her.

== Cast ==
- Milla Olin
- Maiken Ostermann
