= I slik en natt =

- Directed by: Sigval Maartmann-Moe
- Written by: Sigval Maartmann-Moe; Colbjørn Helander
- Starring: Anne-Lise Tangstad; Joachim Holst-Jensen; Lalla Carlsen
- Cinematography: Per G. Jonson
- Edited by: Sølve Kern
- Music by: Øivin Fjeldstad
- Distributed by: Kommunenes filmcentral
- Release date: January 23, 1958
- Running time: 98 minutes
- Country: Norway
- Language: Norwegian

I slik en natt (On a Night Like This) is a Norwegian war film from 1958 directed by Sigval Maartmann-Moe. It stars Anne-Lise Tangstad. The music was composed by Øivin Fjeldstad.

The title I slik en natt is taken from Henrik Wergeland's poem "Juleaftenen" (Christmas Eve) in his poetry collection Jøden (The Jew), and the film deals with the Gestapo's search for a group of Jewish children in Oslo and bold action to bring the children to safety.

== Plot ==
=== In the film ===
In November 1942 in occupied Norway, a group of Jewish refugee children are in danger, and a young doctor tries to save them from the Germans. They engage in a dramatic escape to Sweden.

=== Historical event ===
Colbjørn Helander's film script is based on an actual event, although it is not a documentary. In the fall of 1942, the Nazis had begun sending Norwegian Jews to concentration camps in Germany. The film shows German soldiers carrying out the arrests of the Jews, but in reality, only Norwegians did it. Several people helped with the escape, but the film combines them in the character of the young female doctor. Two Norwegian women gathered the orphaned Jewish children at an orphanage in Oslo. However, they were also not safe there. Just minutes before the Gestapo arrived, the children had been moved. The real rescue operation was led by the German-Russian child psychologist Nina Hasvoll and the Norwegian Sigrid Helliesen Lund when the children at the Jewish orphanage in Oslo were smuggled into Sweden in the fall of 1942, thus escaping the Holocaust. Filmmaker Nina Grünfeld's documentary film Ninas barn is about this rescue operation.

== Cast ==
The young doctor is played by Anne-Lise Tangstad. Two other important roles are played by Lalla Carlsen as Maren the housekeeper and Joachim Holst-Jensen as a composer and the young doctor's uncle. Together they manage to keep the young refugees hidden for a few nerve-wracking weeks before they can be sent across the border to Sweden and safety. Something that helped give the film more realism were the two Germans that portrayed SS officers. The director, Sigval Maartmann-Moe, had himself experienced SS men at uncomfortably close range, and he believed that Germans were needed to portray this type. He was able to "borrow" Günther Hüttmann and Ottakar Panning from the German theater and, according to Maartmann-Moe, this German–Norwegian collaboration worked perfectly.

- Lalla Carlsen as Maren
- Joachim Holst-Jensen as Goggen
- Anne-Lise Tangstad as Liv Kraft
- Freddie Aronzon as a child refugee
- Yvonne Aronzon as a child refugee
- Hilde Brenni as the home front contact
- Per Christensen as a railway employee
- André Deloya as a child refugee
- Nili Deloya as a child refugee
- Victor Deloya as Lehmann, a doctor
- Stig Egede-Nissen as the janitor
- Knut M. Hansson as an SS officer
- Günther Hüttmann as von Feldhofen, an SS adjutant
- Øivind Johnssen as the driver's brother
- Willy Kramer-Johansen as a doctor
- Anne-Rita Leimann as a child refugee
- Leonard Levin as a child refugee
- Erling Lindahl as the interrogator
- Jon Lennart Mjøen as an SS officer
- Arve Opsahl as a policeman
- Edith Ottosen as an informer
- Ingrid Øvre as a nurse
- Ottokar Panning as Kranz
- Thorleif Reiss as the chief physician
- Georg Richter as an SS officer
- Arne Riis as a man at the border
- Harry Rødner as a child refugee
- Jan Rødner as a child refugee
- Ethel-Liv Selikowitz as a child refugee
- Harry Sam Selikowitz as a child refugee
- Rolf Søder as a driver
- Tor Stokke as a policeman
- Stevelin Urdahl as an SS officer
- Aasta Voss
