= Bohwim =

Bohwim is a surname. Notable people with the surname include:

- Alexia Bohwim (born 1969), Norwegian writer and feminist, daughter of Knut
- Knut Bohwim (1931–2020), Norwegian film director
