= List of Norwegian Righteous Among the Nations =

During the occupation of Norway by Nazi Germany, its Jewish community was subject to persecution and deported to extermination camps. Although at least 764 Jews in Norway were killed, over 1,000 were rescued with the help of non-Jewish Norwegians who risked their lives to smuggle the refugees out of Norway, typically to Sweden. As of 1 January 2018, 67 of these individuals have been recognized by Yad Vashem as being Righteous Among the Nations. Yad Vashem has also recognized the Norwegian resistance movement collectively.

== List ==
Name	Number	Year	Comment
Bonnevie, Alfhild	8611.2	1999	
Breisjøberget, Ola	10816.5	2006	For the rescue of children at the Jewish Children's Home in Oslo
Bryn, Harald & Nanti	8611.3	1999	
Faye-Hansen, Per	11021	2007	
Follestad, Einar & Agnes	8611	1999	For rescuing the Raskow family in Oslo
Hasvold, Nina (Hackel)	10816	2006	For the rescue of children at the Jewish Children's Home in Oslo
Helliesen-Lund, Sigrid	10856	2006	For the rescue of children at the Jewish Children's Home in Oslo
Hougen, Bjørn & Torbjørg	9750	2002	
Hougen, Helga (1)	9750.1	2002	
Hougen, Helga (2)	9750.2	2002	The two Helga Hougens were cousins.
Kleivan, Kåre	10764.2	2006	
Malm, Erling	5881	1994	Committed suicide rather than reveal network that smuggled Jews out of Norway
Mamen, Hans Christen	1248	1979	Lutheran minister who acted as a border pilot, bringing small groups of refugees from his home municipality of Asker across the border to Sweden, and ended up fleeing himself.
Michelsen, Bjørn & Astrid & his father August	9493	2001	
Nielssen, Finn & Valdis	8611.4	1999	
Nilsen, Nikolai & Anny, children Edmund, Nordal, Jenny, Pauline	10764	2006	For the rescue of Smith family in Tromsø
Norwegian Underground Movement	616.1	1977	Awarded collectively, among other things for Carl Fredriksens Transport
Rauken, Ola	10816.4	2006	For the rescue of children at the Jewish Children's Home in Oslo
Alice Resch Synnestvedt	2142.1	1982	A Norwegian citizen, but active in France with the American Friends Service Committee (Quakers).
Roth, Per	6267	1994	For assisting Jewish boys in Sachsenhausen concentration camp
Rotvold, Markus	10764.1	2006	For the rescue of Smith family in Tromsø
Sjølie Oscar & Frida	10565	2005	
Sletten-Fosstvedt, Ingebjørg	70	1967	Helped the family of rabbi Julius Samuel escape to Sweden
Solvang, Martin	10816.2	2006	For the rescue of children at the Jewish Children's Home in Oslo
Tanberg, Gerda	10816.3	2006	For the rescue of children at the Jewish Children's Home in Oslo
Tosterud (Limbodal), Margit	9069	2000	
Waal, Caroline ("Nic")	10816.1	2006	For the rescue of children at the Jewish Children's Home in Oslo
Wellen, Einar	6846	1995	For arranging for the escape of the Rosenberg family, and others.
Wilhelmsen, Agnes & Carl	8611.1	1999	

== See also ==
- Rescuers of Jews during the Holocaust
