= Ester Samuel-Cahn =

Israeli statistician and educator (1933–2015)

- אסתר שמואל-כחן
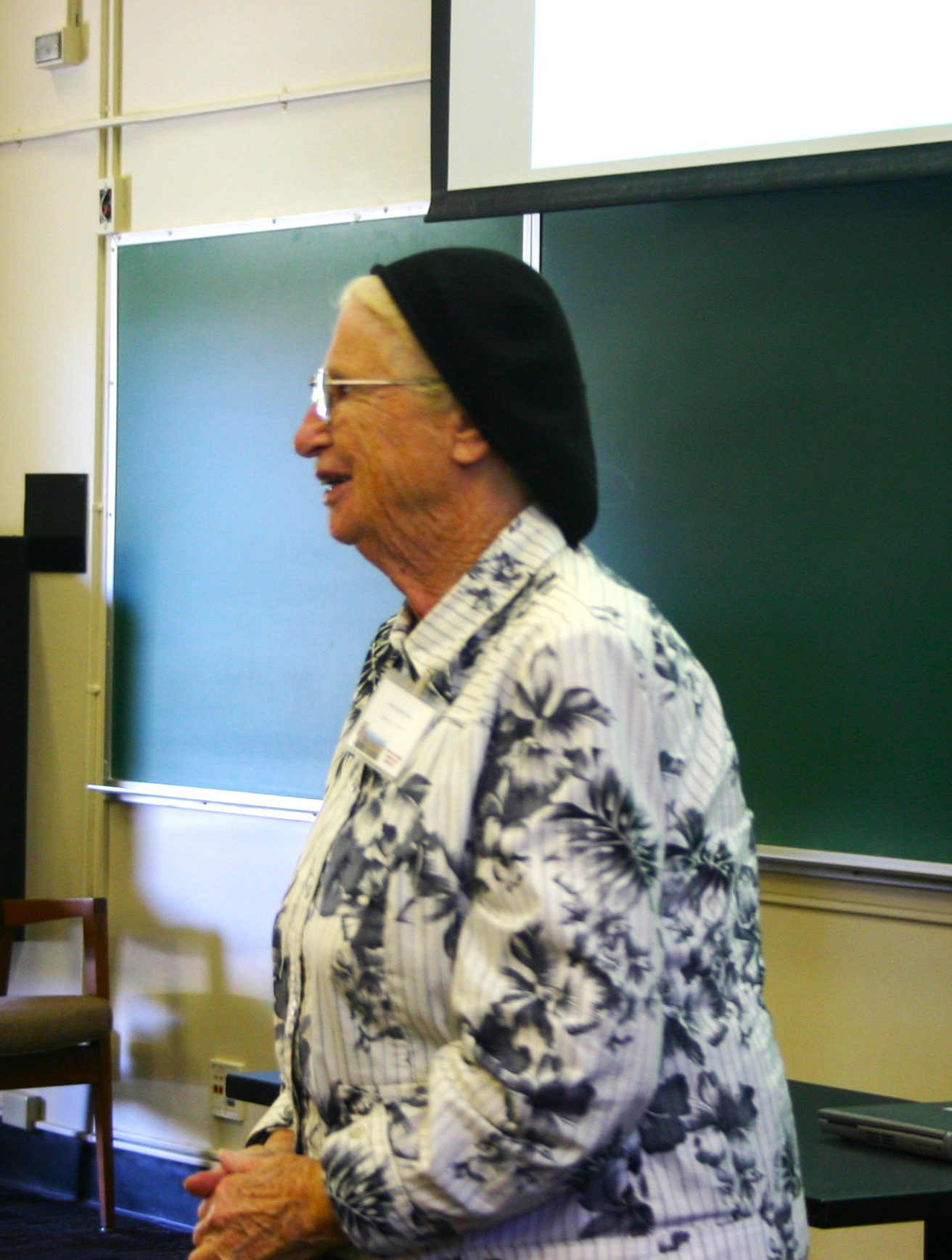
- Born: Ester Samuel; May 16, 1933; Oslo, Norway
- Died: November 20, 2015 (aged 82)
- Education: Columbia University
- Scientific career
- Fields: Statistics
- Workplaces: Hebrew University of Jerusalem

Ester Samuel-Cahn (Hebrew: אסתר שמואל-כחן; May 16, 1933 – November 20, 2015) was an Israeli statistician and educator. She was a professor emeritus at the Hebrew University of Jerusalem.

== Biography ==
Samuel-Cahn was born in Oslo, Norway. During the Nazi occupation of Norway, in 1942, her father, a rabbi, was warned that he would be arrested by the Germans. He refused to leave in order to try to support his community. In September, her father was ordered to report to the Gestapo office, where he was questioned and later sent to Auschwitz. Later that year, the Nazis were going to arrest the other Jews in Oslo, however, Samuel-Cahn's family were moved by members of the underground, Ingebjørg Sletten-Fosstvedt and Sigrid Helliesen Lund, to safety and later to a refugee camp in neutral Sweden. In order to cross the border, Samuel-Cahn and the rest of her family had to hide in trucks used to transport potatoes. In Stockholm, Samuel-Cahn's family found out that her father had been killed in Auschwitz. In 1946, Samuel-Cahn, her mother, and brothers moved to Mandatory Palestine (part of which later became Israel).

Samuel-Cahn received her Ph.D. from Columbia University in 1961. From 1993 to 1995, she was the president of the Israel Statistical Association. In 1989, she was elected as a Fellow of the American Statistical Association. She was also a fellow of the Norwegian Academy of Science and Letters from 1989, and of the Institute of Mathematical Statistics.

In 2004, Samuel-Cahn won the Israel Prize for her work in statistics. In 2012, she spoke at a memorial ceremony in the Martyrs' Forest in Jerusalem Hills, commemorating Norwegian Jews murdered in the Holocaust and remembering those who helped hide and protect Jews in Norway.

She died in November 2015.

== Selected publications ==
- Bartroff, Jay; Samuel-Cahn, Ester (2011). "The Fighter problem: Optimal allocation of a discrete commodity". Advances in Applied Probability. 43: 121–130. arXiv:1107.5066. doi:10.1239/aap/1300198515.
- Bartroff, Jay; Goldstein, Larry; Rinott, Yosef; Samuel-Cahn, Ester (2010). "On optimal allocation of a continuous resource using an iterative approach and total positivity". Advances in Applied Probability. 42: 795–815. arXiv:1103.0308. doi:10.1239/aap/1282924063.
- Krieger, Abba M.; Pollak, Moshe; Samuel-Cahn, Ester (2010). "Extreme(ly) mean(ingful): Sequential formation of a quality group". The Annals of Applied Probability. 20 (6): 2261–2294. arXiv:1011.3320. Bibcode:2010arXiv1011.3320K. doi:10.1214/10-AAP684. S2CID 119318513.
- Bartroff, Jay; Goldstein, Larry; Samuel-Cahn, Ester (2009). "The spend-it-all region and small time results for the continuous Bomber problem". Sequential Analysis. 29: 275–291. arXiv:1007.3025. doi:10.1080/07474946.2011.539920.
- Krieger, Abba M.; Pollak, Moshe; Samuel-Cahn, Ester (2007). "Select Sets: Rank and File". The Annals of Applied Probability. 17 (1): 360. arXiv:math/0703032. Bibcode:2007math......3032K. doi:10.1214/105051606000000691. S2CID 14486113.
- Assaf, David; Goldstein, Larry; Samuel-Cahn, Ester (2002). "Ratio Prophet Inequalities When the Mortal Has Several Choices". Annals of Applied Probability. 12 (3): 972–984. doi:10.1214/aoap/1031863177.
- Assaf, David; Samuel-Cahn, Ester (1998). "Optimal Multivariate Stopping Rules" (PDF). Journal of Applied Probability. 35 (3): 693–706. doi:10.1239/jap/1032265217. S2CID 121695795.
- Rinott, Yosef; Samuel-Cahn, Ester (1992-01-01). Stochastic inequalities. Institute of Mathematical Statistics Lecture Notes - Monograph Series. Hayward, California: Institute of Mathematical Statistics. pp. 343–358. doi:10.1214/lnms/1215461961. ISBN 978-0-940600-29-4. S2CID 117812808.
- Samuel-Cahn, Ester (1984). "Comparison of Threshold Stop Rules and Maximum for Independent Nonnegative Random Variables". The Annals of Probability. 12 (4): 1213–1216. doi:10.1214/aop/1176993150.
- Mertens, Jean-Francois; Samuel-Cahn, Ester; Zamir, Shmuel (1978). "Necessary and Sufficient Conditions for Recurrence and Transience of Markov Chains, in Terms of Inequalities". Journal of Applied Probability. 15 (4): 848–851. CiteSeerX 10.1.1.142.3519. doi:10.2307/3213440. JSTOR 3213440. S2CID 11893669.
