= Nina Hasvoll =

Russian–Norwegian psychoanalyst (1910–1999)

- Born: May 25, 1910; Saint Petersburg, Russian Empire
- Died: December 19, 1999 (aged 89)
- Occupation: Psychoanalyst
- Awards: Righteous Among the Nations

Nina Hasvoll (née Hackel, May 25, 1910 – December 19, 1999), surname also Hasvold and Hasvold Meyer, was a Russian–Norwegian psychoanalyst. She headed the Jewish Children's Home in Oslo during the Second World War, and she escaped to Sweden in 1942 with 14 children. The orphanage and the escape inspired the 1958 film I slik en natt by Sigval Maartmann-Moe and the 2015 film Ninas barn by Nina Grünfeld.

== Background ==
Hasvoll was born into a Jewish family in Saint Petersburg as Nina Hackel. Her father was a pharmacist and later a businessman, who became rich from a psoriasis ointment. As a result of the Russian Revolution, the family emigrated in 1918, like noblemen and other capitalists, to Germany, and settled in Berlin. She attended the social education seminar of the Youth Home Association (German: Verein Jugendheim) in Charlottenburg. From 1931 to 1936 she studied at the Berlin Psychoanalytic Institute. She attended analysis with Adelheid Fuchs-Kamp and was together with Nic Waal at the orphanage seminar led by Otto Fenichel and Harald Schultz-Hencke.

The developments after Hitler's rise to power resulted in Hasvoll fleeing to France. In 1936, she traveled to Oslo to study psychology. She joined the circle around Wilhelm Reich and studied character analysis with Nic Waal. The study of psychology offered a residence permit for only half a year. She therefore entered into a pro forma marriage with the socialist journalist Bertold Hasvoll (1912–2001) to obtain a permanent residence permit in Norway. The couple divorced in 1943.

== Escape to Sweden ==
In 1938 Hasvoll took over the management of an orphanage for the Jewish congregation in Oslo. The orphanage had taken in Jewish children from Austria and Czechoslovakia. After the persecution of Jews had started in Norway in 1942, she fled to Sweden with 14 children: six girls and eight boys 8 to 14 years old. It started on November 25, 1942, when Hasvoll received a warning from Nic Waal about rumors of what was going to happen that night. On November 26, 1942, 532 Norwegian Jews were transported from Norway on the SS Donau and onward to the Auschwitz concentration camp. The children in the orphanage were first taken to Gudrun and Ragnar Karlsen's apartment in Grorud. From there they were taken in two pools to Gerda Tanberg's apartment in Ullern. There they lay under cover until Waal and Tanberg had arranged transport to Sweden. The flight to Sweden took place in two groups; Hasvoll and only the boys traveled first, and then the others. The children took a taxi to a log cabin at Kongsvinger. From there they traveled on foot across the border. In Sweden, they moved into the Engabo house in Alingsås outside Gothenburg. For the escape and the rescue operation, Hasvoll and her helpers were awarded Yad Vashem's honorific of Righteous Among the Nations. Among the children that fled to Sweden was Berthold Grünfeld. His daughter Nina Grünfeld is named after Hasvoll.

After the Second World War, Hasvoll went to Denmark together with the German Jew Peter Meyer. The couple married in Copenhagen on April 5, 1950. In 1951 she became an honorary member of the Danish–Norwegian Psychoanalytical Association (Norwegian: Dansk-Norsk Psykoanalytisk Forening) and practiced as a psychoanalyst in Copenhagen. Hasvoll was employed as the first psychologist at a Danish hospital. Her appointment was first made as a preschool teacher. When the job title was changed to psychologist, it took time for her services to be recognized because psychologists were also regarded by university professors as charlatans (Danish: kloge koner 'cunning women').

Nina Hasvoll died on December 19, 1999.
