= Stolpersteine in Lomnice u Tišnova =

Memorial installations in Czech Republic

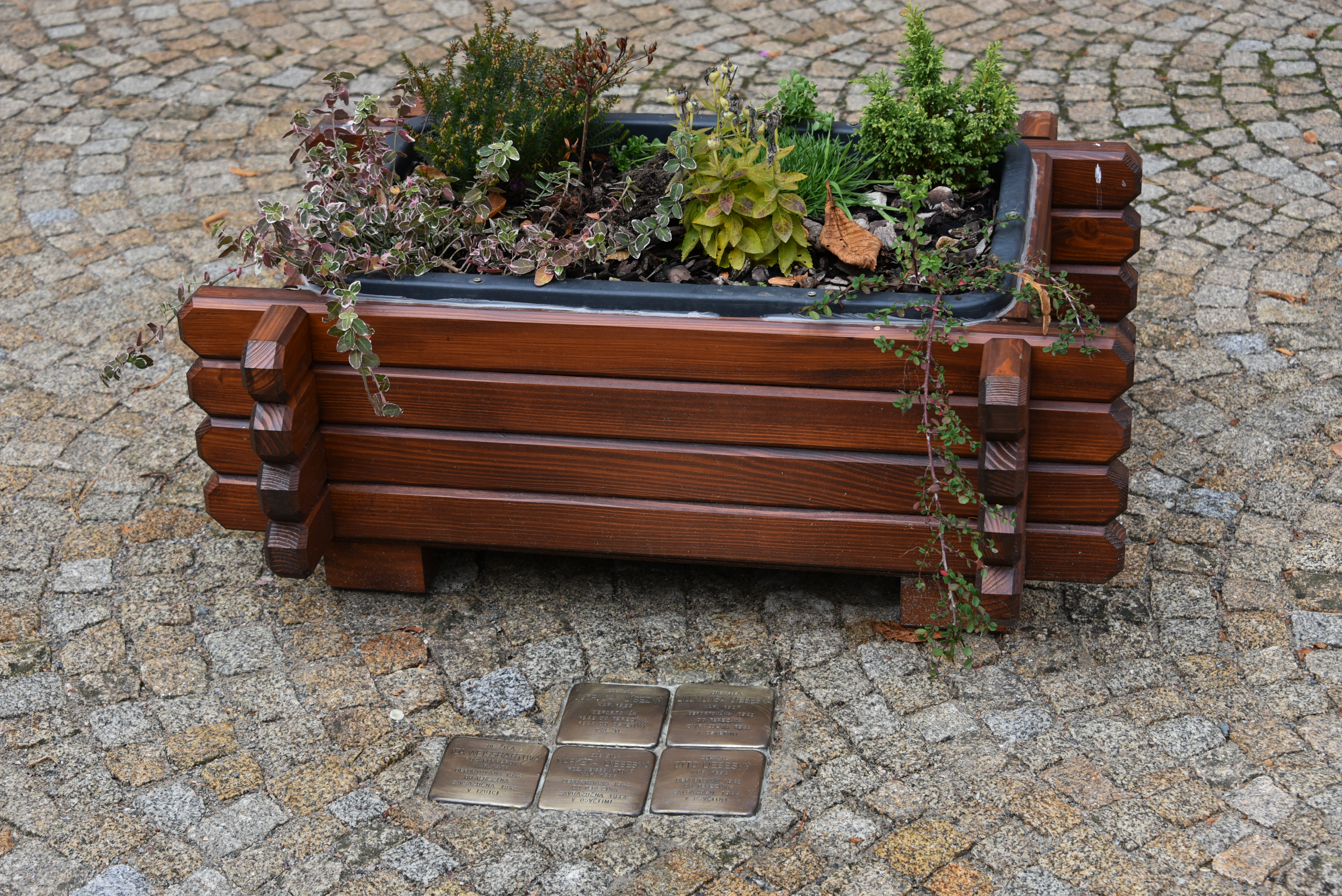
Stolpersteine in Lomnice u Tišnova for four Shoah victims of family Liebesný/Weissbart and for one survivor

This article lists the Stolpersteine in the town Lomnice (Brno-Country District) in the South Moravian Region (Czech: Jihomoravský kraj). Stolpersteine is the German name for stumbling blocks collocated all over Europe by German artist Gunter Demnig. They remember the fate of the Nazi victims being murdered, deported, exiled or driven to suicide.

Generally, the stumbling blocks are posed in front of the building where the victims had their last self chosen residence. The name of the Stolpersteine in Czech is: Kameny zmizelých, stones of the disappeared.

The lists are sortable; the basic order follows the alphabet according to the last name of the victim.

== Lomnice u Tišnova ==
The Jewish community of Lomnice u Tišnova existed since the beginning of the 18th century. But already in 1571 a "certain Jew" from Lomnice was mentioned, the first written evidence of the existence of Jewish population in the city. While in the 16th and 17th century there were only few Jews coming to Lomnice, this changed at the beginning of the 18th century. 708 Jews from Lysice were resettled in Lomnice. A first Jewish community with a prayer hall was established. Around 1800 about 80 Jewish families lived in Lomnice with about 611 persons, that was then at least half the inhabitants. In the first half of the 19th century there was also a Yeshiva, a Jewish university in the city. In 1830, the community consisted of 606 persons, more than a third of the population. Thereafter the Jewish portion of the population decreased continuously: in 1848 only 306 (20%), in 1900 merely 88 people (5%), 1930 only 30 persons (2%). A rabbi was active here until 1919. In 1929, the Jewish community was finally dissolved.

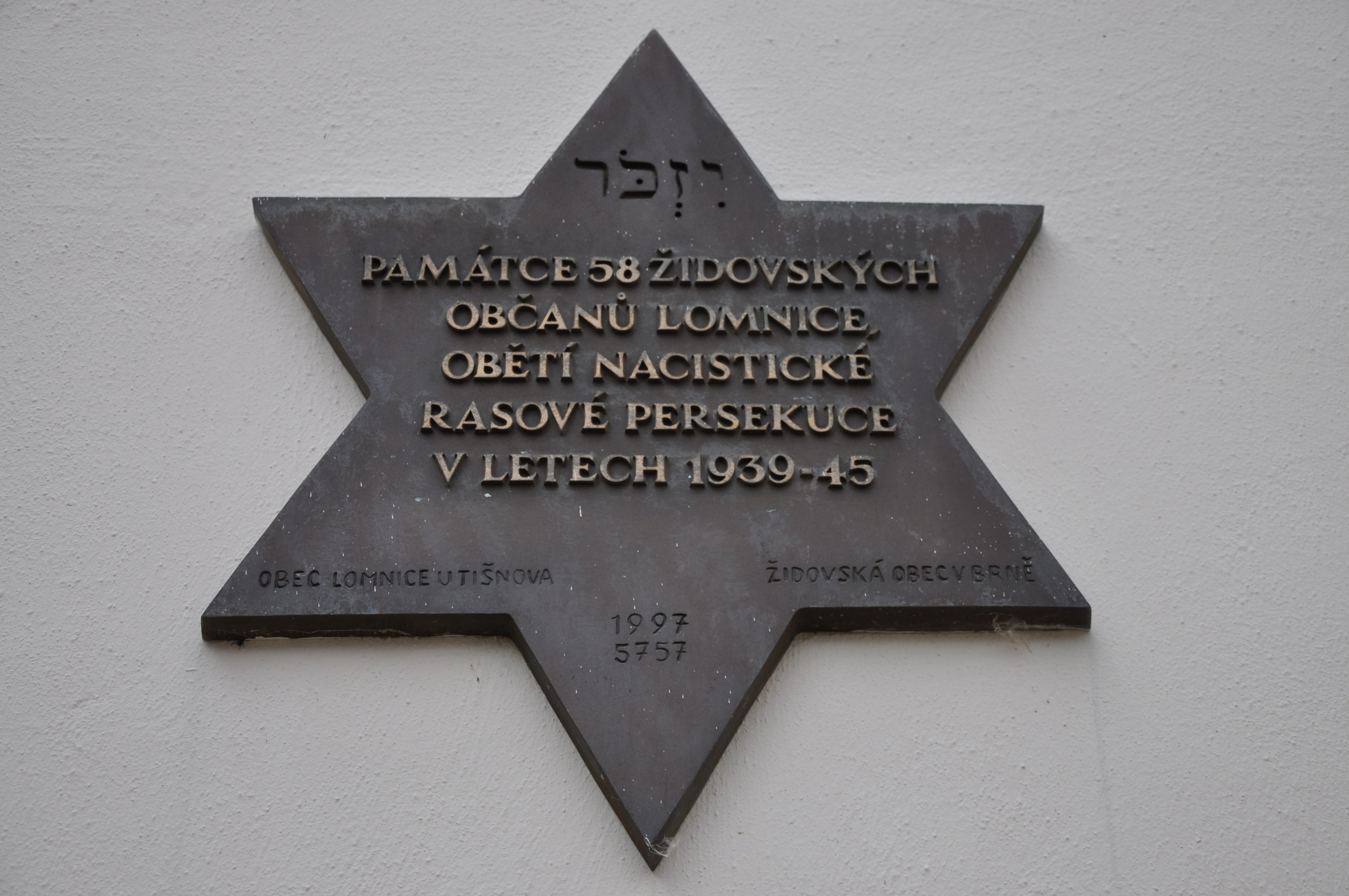
Memorial plaque, 1997

After the destruction of Czechoslovakia and the German occupation, about 35 Jews from other municipalities in the region sought refuge in Lomnice. Already in autumn of 1941, however, their property was confiscated, their freedom of movement was restricted. Deportations were carried out between December 1941 and April 1942. The first transport took place on 5 December 1941 (Transport K), the last and largest from Brno on 4 April 1942 (transport Ah). The oldest person on this train was Mrs. Schiller, 86 years old, the youngest was Libuška Tuliss, not even three years old. After the war, only one Jew, Jan Líbezný, returned to Lomnice. He had lost all his relatives in Nazi concentration camps. On the occasion of the reopening of the Lomnic Synagogue in 1997, a memorial plaque for 58 victims of the Shoah was unveiled. On 17 September 2011, the first collocation of Stolpersteine took place. They were dedicated to the Liebesny family.

Stone	Inscription	Location	Life and death
	HERE LIVED; ARNOŠT BLEIWEIS; BORN 1914; DEPORTED; 1942 JOINED THE ARMY; KILLED IN ACTION 8.3.1943; BATTLE OF SOKOLOVO	Josefa Uhra 198; 49°24′22″N 16°24′41″E	Arnošt Bleiweis was born on 17 August 1914 in Lomnice u Tišnova. In 1942 he entered the Czechoslovak exile army in the Soviet Union. He was killed in action on 8 March 1943 at Sokolov. Posthumously he received the Czechoslovak War Cross 1939–1945. In 1948 he received the Sokolovská Memorial Medal. His name is engraved on a monument in Lomnice u Tišnova.
	HERE LIVED; JINDŘICH BLEIWEIS; BORN 1879; DEPORTED; 1942 TO THERESIENSTADT; 1942 TO REJOWIEC; MURDERED	Josefa Uhra 198; 49°24′22″N 16°24′41″E	Jindřich Bleiweis was born on 25 May 1879. On 4 April 1942, he was deported - together with his wife and his daughter - with transport Ah from Brno to Theresienstadt concentration camp. His transport number was 564 of 1,001. Already two weeks later, on 18 April 1942, he and his family were deported by transport Ap to the ghetto of Rejowiec. His transport number was 559 of 1,000. Jindřich Bleiweisová became a victim of the Shoah.
	HERE LIVED; AUGUSTA; BLEIWEISOVÁ; BORN 1907; DEPORTED; 1942 TO THERESIENSTADT; 1942 TO REJOWIEC; MURDERED	Josefa Uhra 198; 49°24′22″N 16°24′41″E	Augusta Bleiweisová was born on 8 January 1907. On 4 April 1942, she was deported - together with mother and father - with transport Ah from Brno to Theresienstadt concentration camp. Her transport number was 566 of 1,001. Already two weeks later, on 18 April 1942, she and her parents were deported by transport Ap to the ghetto of Rejowiec. Her transport number was 561 of 1,000. Augusta Bleiweisová became a victim of the Shoah.
	HERE LIVED; BERTA BLEIWEISOVÁ; BORN 1880; DEPORTED; 1942 TO THERESIENSTADT; 1942 TO REJOWIEC; MURDERED	Josefa Uhra 198; 49°24′22″N 16°24′41″E	Berta Bleiweisová was born on 20 January 1880. She got transport no. 565 and was deported - together with husband and daughter - with transport Ah on 4 April 1942 from Brno to Theresienstadt concentration camp. Already two weeks later, on 18 April 1942, she and her family were deported by transport Ap to the ghetto of Rejowiec. Her transport number was 560. Berta Bleiweisová became a victim of the Shoah.
	HERE LIVED; DR. JUR. JAN LÍBEZNÝ; BORN 1923; DEPORTED; 1942 TO THERESIENSTADT; 1944 TO AUSCHWITZ; SURVIVED	Josefa Uhra 231; 49°24′23″N 16°24′43″E	Jan Líbezný (originally Liebesný) was born on 6 December 1923 as the son of Otto Liebesný and Markéta Liebesná in Lomnice u Tišnova. He had a younger sister, Lilly Luisa (born 1927). After visiting the municipal school in Tišnov, he worked in various professions. In 1942, he was deported to Theresienstadt concentration camp by the Nazi regime. In 1944, he was deported to Auschwitz concentration camp, and thereafter during the same year to Schwarzheide, an outpost of Sachsenhausen concentration camp. In April 1945 Jan Líbezný was transferred to Sachsenhausen and then liberated. As the only member of his family, he could survive the Nazi regime and the Shoah. After his return to Czechoslovakia in 1945 he had his name czechised. He met Zdenka Blahoňovská, married her in 1947 and moved to Tišnov. Together they had two daughters. In 1951, the family moved to Trutnov. Jan Líbezný studied law and became a lawyer. He died on 27 June 2006 in Trutnov, where he was also buried.
	HERE LIVED; LILLY LUISA LIEBESNÁ; BORN 1927; DEPORTED 1942; TO THERESIENSTADT; MURDERED 1944; IN AUSCHWITZ	Josefa Uhra 231; 49°24′23″N 16°24′43″E	Lilly Luisa Liebesná was born on 18 March 1927 in Lomnice u Tišnova. Her parents were Otto Liebesný and Markéta Liebesná. She had an older brother, Jan, born in 1923. Together with her parents and her brother, she was deported from Brno to Theresienstadt concentration camp with transport Ah on 4 April 1942. The family stayed there for two years. On 18 May 1944 they were deported to Auschwitz concentration camp with transport Eb. During the liquidation of the so-called Theresienstadt family camp in Auschwitz-Birkenau, she and per parents were murdered in the gas chamber. This took place between 10 July and 12 July 1944. Only her brother Jan Líbezný could survive the Nazi regime and the Shoah.
	HERE LIVED; MARKÉTA LIEBESNÁ; NÉE WEISSBARTOVÁ; BORN 1898; DEPORTED 1942; TO THERESIENSTADT; MURDERED 1944; IN AUSCHWITZ	Josefa Uhra 231; 49°24′23″N 16°24′43″E	Markéta Liebesná née Weissbartová was born on 13 November 1898 in Lomnice u Tišnova. Her mother was Ida Weissbartová born Popperová (1876-1942). She married Otto Liebesný, the couple lived in Lomnice and had two children: Jan and Lilly Luisa. In 1940, her mother Ida Weissbartová came to live with them in the family household. On 29 March 1942 Ida Weissbartová was deported to Theresienstadt concentration camp. A few days later also the other family members were arrested. Markéta Liebesná was deported with her husband and children on 4 April 1942, with transport Ah from Brno to Theresienstadt. Her transport number was 527. Her mother was forced to leave Theresienstadt at the end of the same month. She was deported to Izbica and murdered there. The other family members remained united in Theresienstadt until 18 May 1944. On this day they were deported by transport Eb to Auschwitz concentration camp. Her transport number was 2056. Markéta Liebesná, her husband and their daughter were murdered between July 10 and July 12 of 1944 by the Nazi regime in the gas chambers. Only her son could survive.
	HERE LIVED; OTTO LIEBESNÝ; BORN 1894; DEPORTED 1942; TO THERESIENSTADT; MURDERED 1944; IN AUSCHWITZ	Josefa Uhra 231; 49°24′23″N 16°24′43″E	Otto Liebesný was born on 6 January 1894 in Lomnice u Tišnova. He was one of two sons of Louisa (1861-1921) and Moritz Liebesný (1850-1925). His father was a merchant. The tombs of his parents are located in the Jewish cemetery in Lomnice. Otto Liebesný married Markéta Weisbartová, the couple had two children: Jan and Lilly Luisa. Parents and children were deported from Brno to Theresienstadt concentration camp on 4 April 1942, and from there on 18 May 1944 to Auschwitz concentration camp. Otto Liebesný, his wife and their daughter were murdered between July 10 and July 12 of 1944 by the Nazi regime in the gas chambers. Only their son could survive.
	HERE LIVED; IDA WEISSBARTOVÁ; NÉE POPPEROVÁ; BORN 1876; DEPORTED 1942; TO THERESIENSTADT; MURDERED 1942; IN IZBICA	Josefa Uhra 231; 49°24′23″N 16°24′43″E	Ida Weissbartová née Popperová was born on 6 February 1876 in Lomnice u Tišnova. She was the mother of Markéta Liebesná and the grandmother of Jan Líbezný (1923-2003) and Lilly Luisa Liebesná (1927-1944). In 1940 she moved to her daughter, her son-in-law and her grandchildren. On 29 March 1942, she was deported from Brno to Theresienstadt concentration camp by transport Ae. Her transport number was 321 of 1,000. On 27 April 1942, she was deported to Izbica Ghetto near Lublin by transport Aq. Her transport number was 762 of 999. There she was murdered in the same year. Also her daughter, her son-in-law and her granddaughter died.

== Dates of collocations ==
The Stolpersteine in Lomnice were collocated by the artist himself on the following dates:

- 6 November 2011: Josefa Uhra 231
- 14 September 2013: Josefa Uhra 198.

The Czech Stolperstein project was initiated in 2008 by the Česká unie židovské mládeže (Czech Union of Jewish Youth) and was realized with the patronage of the Mayor of Prague.

== See also ==
- List of places with Stolpersteine
- Stolpersteine in the Czech Republic
