= Salomea =

Salomea may refer to:

== People with the name ==
- Salomea of Berg (c. 1099/1101 – 1144), High Duchess of Poland
- Salomea Halpir (1718 – after 1763), Polish–Lithuanian medic and oculist
- Salomea of Poland (1211/1212 – 1268), Queen of Halych
- Salomea Kempner (1880–1940?), Polish psychoanalyst
- Salomea Andronikova (1888 – 1982), Georgian socialite of the literary and artistic world
- Solomiya Krushelnytska (1872 – 1952), Ukrainian lyric-dramatic soprano
- Salomea Deszner (1759 – 1806), Polish stage actress, opera singer, and theater director
- Salka Viertel (1889 – 1978), Austrian actress and Hollywood screenwriter
- Sally Fox (1929 – 2006), American photographer, art collector and editor

== Places ==
- Salomea, Warsaw, a neighbourhood in the city of Warsaw, Poland
