= Storaas =

Storaas is a Norwegian surname. Notable people with the surname include:

- Gaute Storaas (born 1959), Norwegian jazz musician (bass) and composer
- Vigleik Storaas (born 1963), Norwegian jazz pianist and composer
