= Hans Christen Mamen =

Norwegian resistance member and politician (1919–2009)

Hans Christen Mamen (20 April 1919 – 14 October 2009) was a Norwegian resistance member, local historian, priest and politician for the Christian Democratic Party.

== Biography ==
He hailed from the farm Vogellund in Asker. He started studies at the MF Norwegian School of Theology, and was a volunteer on the Finnish side in the Winter War, a war between the Soviet Union and Finland from 1939 to 1940. During the occupation of Norway by Nazi Germany he became involved in the Norwegian resistance movement and had to flee to Sweden. He continued his education and graduated from Uppsala University. He was a courier for the Norwegian legation in Stockholm's department IV from 1944, and was a border pilot for Jews who fled across the Norway-Sweden border. For this he was declared as a Righteous among the Nations.

After the war he returned to the MF Norwegian School of Theology and took the practical-theological education in 1946. He was a hospital priest at Dikemark Hospital from 1948 to 1969, and vicar in Oppegård from 1970 to 1978. From 1978 to 1988 he was the vicar in Ås besides being the dean in Follo.

He was a member of Asker municipal council from 1948 to 1951, representing the Christian Democratic Party. A prolific local history writer, he also co-founded Asker og Bærum Historical Association, and is an honorary member both here and in Follo Historical Association. He was also active in the Norwegian Association of Clergy, and in scouting.

He died in October 2009 in Asker.
