= Emergency Landing (1952 film) =

1952 Norwegian war film

- Promotional poster
- Norwegian: Nødlanding
- Directed by: Arne Skouen
- Written by: Colbjørn Helander; Arne Skouen
- Produced by: Rigmor Hansson
- Starring: Henki Kolstad
- Cinematography: Per G. Jonson
- Edited by: Jan Erik Düring
- Release date: 21 January 1952
- Running time: 100 minutes
- Country: Norway
- Language: Norwegian

Emergency Landing (Norwegian: Nødlanding) is a 1952 Norwegian war film directed by Arne Skouen. It was entered into the 1952 Cannes Film Festival. The film depicts the Norwegian resistance attempting to hide shot-down American aviators from the German occupation forces.

== Plot ==
An American bomber is shot down on the Norwegian coast during World War II. The airmen bail out and land at different locations. In spite of the German search for them, the Norwegian resistance picks them up and hides them in the attic of the local church, a center of operations. Things become tense, however, when the hideout is spotted by a notorious collaborator, and soon the protagonist, Hans (Henki Kolstad), has to get the airmen to Sweden.

== Cast ==
- Henki Kolstad - Hans
- Jack Kennedy - Eddie, captain
- Randi Kolstad - Kristin
- Bjarne Andersen - Stråmannen
- Jens Bolling - Knut
- Einar Vaage - Edvartsen, churchwarden
- Samuel Matlowsky - Leo, sergeant
- Lee Payant - Fiorello, 2nd lt.
- John Robbins - Don, sergeant
- Lee Zimmer - Steve, sergeant
- Chris Bugge - Mart, 1st lt.
- Joachim Holst-Jensen - Willie, the vicar (as J. Holst Jensen)
