= Per Faye-Hansen =

Per Faye-Hansen (1916 – 1992) was a Norwegian pastor who risked his life to save Jews during World War II, for which he was recognized by Yad VaShem as a Righteous Among the Nations.

== World War II ==
In October 1942, Faye-Hansen organized a temporary hiding place in a flower shop in Majorstuen for Jewish refugees. He meticulously arranged the escape of this group of Jews to Sweden with the utmost secrecy. They were transferred by lorry to Asker, outside Oslo, where they were hidden in a house that belonged to the underground. They were taken to several other hiding places, until they reached the Swedish border.

== Post-war ==
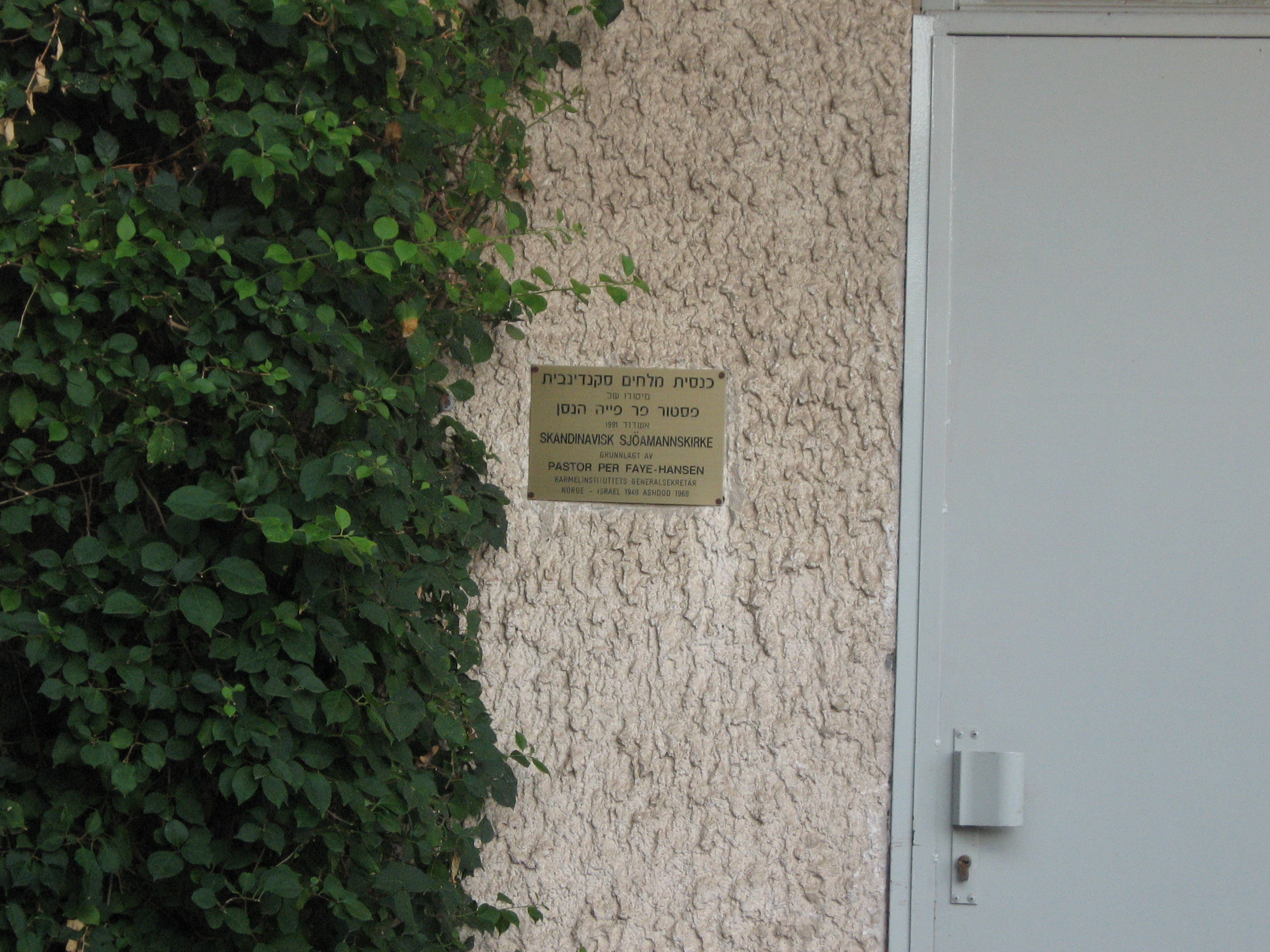
The sign on the wall of Seamen's Church in Ashdod regarding Per Faye-Hansen

After the war, Faye-Hansen founded the Scandinavian Seaman's Church in Haifa in 1949. In 1969, he did the same in Ashdod following the establishment of the port. He served for a number of years as priest for Norwegians in Israel. He subsequently published several books on Israel and religious themes. Throughout his life he remained committed to developing Norwegian-Israeli relations. He also founded the Carmel Institute (Karmel-Instituttet), an organization dedicated to "pointing out the fulfillment of prophecies in Israel today, and to proclaim it within the Nordic countries and in Israel."

== Righteous Among the Nations ==
On 11 March 2007, the Commission for the Designation of the Righteous Among the Nations at Yad Vashem reached the decision to award the title of Righteous Among the Nations to the late Per Faye-Hansen of Norway. According to a press release from Yad Vashem, Faye-Hansen was recognized for his efforts during World War II in hiding Jews in Norway and assisting in their escape to Sweden.
