= Colbjørn Helander =

Norwegian screenwriter and translator(1911–1962)

- Born: September 7, 1911
- Died: January 13, 1962 (aged 50)
- Resting place: Ullern Cemetery
- Occupations: Screenwriter and translator

Colbjørn Henry Helander (September 7, 1911 – January 13, 1962) was a Norwegian screenwriter and translator.

Helander was originally a publisher, but in 1949 he was employed as a literary consultant at Norsk Film. Two years later, he became its managing director. Helander debuted as a screenwriter in 1952 with the film Nødlanding. In addition to his screenplays, he worked as a translator. In 1960 he translated Jack Kerouac's novella The Subterraneans into Norwegian, publishing it as De underjordiske.

== Filmography ==
- 1952: Nødlanding
- 1958: I slik en natt
- 1959: Vår egen tid
- 1961: Hans Nielsen Hauge
- 1962: Lykke og krone
