= Leo Eitinger =

Norwegian psychiatrist (1912–1996)

Leo Eitinger (12 December 1912 – 15 October 1996) was a Norwegian psychiatrist, author and educator. He was a Holocaust survivor who studied the late-onset psychological trauma experienced by people who went through separation and psychological pain early in life only to show traumatic experience decades later. He devoted a long period studying posttraumatic stress disorder among Holocaust survivors, which had led Holocaust survivors including Paul Celan (1920–1970), Primo Levi (1919–1987) and many others to commit suicide several decades after the experience. Eitinger was a pioneer of research into psychological trauma among refugees, and also laid the foundation for Norwegian military psychiatry research with emphasis on psychological trauma among soldiers.

== Early life ==
Leo Eitinger was born in Lomnice, Austria-Hungary (today South Moravian Region, Czech Republic). He grew up as the youngest of six siblings in a Jewish middle class home as the son of Salomon Eitinger (1877–1942) and Helene Kurz (1885–1936).

He studied medicine at the Masaryk University of Brno, graduating in 1937. He fled Nazi persecution of Jews and came to Norway as a refugee with the help of a Nansen passport (Nansenhjelpen) after the German occupation of the Czechoslovak Republic in March 1939. Upon arriving in Norway, he arranged for Jewish children to escape from Czechoslovakia to settle in the Jewish orphanage in Oslo. He was given permission to work as a resident in psychiatry in Norway in Bodø, but the permission was revoked by the Nazis after the German invasion of Norway in 1940.

== During World War II ==
He stayed underground from January 1941 until he was arrested in March 1942. He was imprisoned in various places throughout Norway and was deported on 24 February 1943, arriving at the Auschwitz Concentration Camp. At Auschwitz, Eitinger served in the camp hospital. Towards the end of his confinement he was marched to Buchenwald. Of the 762 Jews deported from Norway to German concentration camps, only 23 survived, Leo Eitinger being one of them.

== Holocaust psychiatrist ==
After the liberation of Norway at the end of World War II, he resumed his medical practice in Norway, specializing in psychiatry. He was assistant physician at Rønvik Hospital in Bodø 1946-48. In 1950, he became associated with the psychiatric clinic of the University of Oslo in the neighborhood of Vinderen in Vestre Aker. In 1966 Leo Eitinger was appointed professor of psychiatry at the University of Oslo and became Head of the University Psychiatric Clinic. Leo Eitinger allocated all his time and efforts to the study of human suffering with emphasis on clinical psychiatry, in particular victimology and disaster psychiatry. He conducted several landmark studies about the long-term psychological and physical effects of extreme stress and also about being a refugee. His work confirmed that the rate of mental illness among refugees appeared much more frequently than in the general population. He published a number of works on the same subject.

Eitinger was a board member and served a chairman of the Norwegian Psychiatric Association (Norsk Psykiatrisk Forening) from 1963 to 1967. He served as chairman of the Psychiatric Section of the Forensic Commission and was President of the Nordic Psychiatry Congresse (Nordiske psykiaterkongresser) in 1962 and 1987. He was elected member of the Norwegian Academy of Sciences in 1971 and was a member of several foreign scientific and psychiatric associations. He received a number of Norwegian and foreign honors including the Fritt Ord Award (Fritt Ords pris) in 1988. In 1978, he was appointed Commander in the Order of St. Olav.

== Personal life ==
In 1946 he married Elisabeth (“Lisl”) Kohn (1914–1999). Leo and Lisl Eitinger devoted their lives to the promotion of human rights and the fight against injustice and racism. Leo Eitinger died in 1996. Lisl Eitinger died during 1999. In their honor, the University of Oslo established "The Lisl and Leo Eitinger Prize". The award has been granted annually since 1986 in recognition of commitment to human rights issues or performance of outstanding research in psychiatry.

== Selected works ==
- Psykiatriske undersøkelser blant flyktninger i Norge, (1958)
- Alkoholisme og narkomani i Norge (1970)
- Mennesker blant mennesker (1985)

Awards
Preceded by Nansen Academy	Recipient of the Fritt Ord Award; 1988	Succeeded by Erik Bye
