= Adelheid Koch =

German-Brazilian psychoanalyst

Adelheid Lucy Koch, née Schwalbe, (1896 – July 29, 1980) was a German-Brazilian psychoanalyst, who pioneered the institutionalization of psychoanalysis in Brazil. She was the first psychoanalyst in Brazil to be recognized by the International Psychoanalytic Association, and founded the Sociedade Brasileira de Psicanálise de São Paulo.

== Life ==
Born in Berlin to a Jewish family, Adelheid Schwalbe studied medicine, writing her medical dissertation on infant mortality among illegitimate children in Berlin. She became a candidate and later a member of the Berlin Psychoanalytical Society. She did training analysis under Otto Fenichel with Salomea Kempner as her supervisor. She married Ernst Heinrich Koch, a lawyer. Told by Ernest Jones of Brazilian interest in psychoanalysis, she left Germany for Brazil in 1936. She worked as a training analyst, supervisor and teacher for a group around Durval Marcondes. As a result of her work, the Brazilian Psychoanalytic Group was recognized by the IPA in December 1942, and in 1951 the Brazilian Psychoanalytic Association of São Paulo was ratified as an IPA member.

Koch published relatively little. An article on 'Omnipotence and sublimation' was based on Kleinian object relations theory: strong tendencies to omnipotence could be constructive if accompanied by equivalent ability to sublimate, and introjection of an object perceived as mostly good'; however, an object perceived as bad would promote destructive omnipotence and delay the ability to sublimate.

== Works ==
- 'Neurose dos pais—Neurose dos filhos' Neurosis of parents—Neurosis of children, Neurobiologia, Vol. 3, No. 1, 1939.
- 'Considerações psicanalíticas sobre simbolos e contos populares' [Psychoanalytic considerations on symbols and folktales], Revista de Neurología e Psychiatria de São Paulo, Vol. 6, No. 1, 1940.
- 'Elementos Básicos da Terapia Psicanalítica' [Basic Elements of Psychoanalytic Therapy], Arquivos de Neuro-Psiquiatria, Vol. 3, No. 4, 1945.
- 'Omnipotencia y sublimacion', Revista de Psicoanálisis, Vol. 4, No. 3, 1956. Translated from the Spanish by Ana Pieczanski as 'Omnipotence and sublimation', in Nydia Lisman-Pieczanski & Alberto Pieczanski, The Pioneers of Psychoanalysis in South America: An essential guide, 2014, ch. 22.
- (with F. H. Capisano) 'Influência Histórico Social na Atitude Analítica' [Influence of Social History on Analytical Attitude], Revista Brasileira de Psicanálise, Vol. 6, No. 3, 1972, pp. 344–356.
