= Gaute Storaas =

Norwegian musician (born 1959)

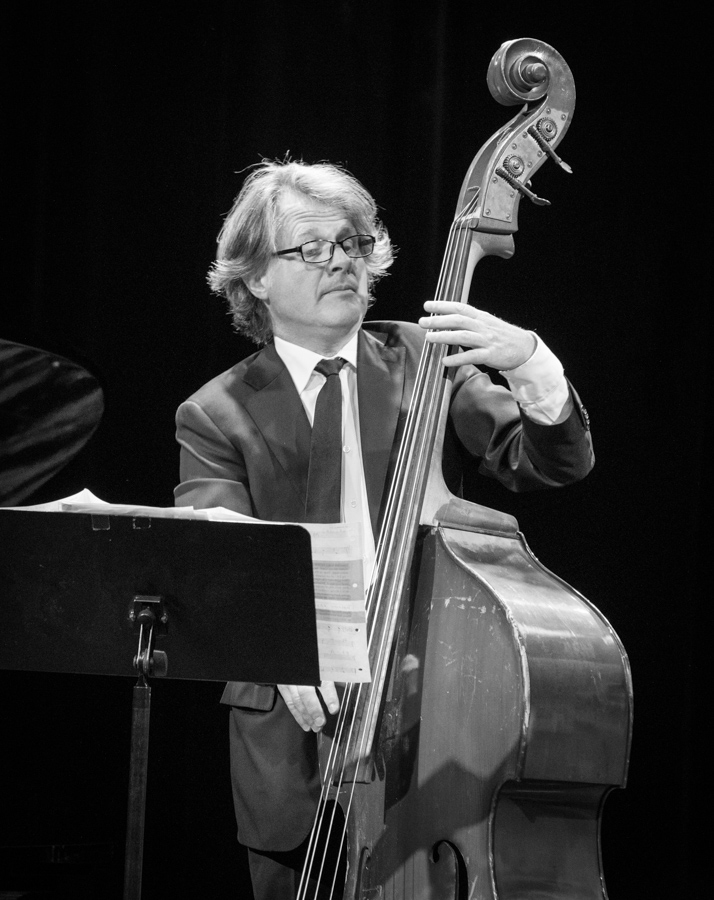
- Gaute Storaas performing at the 2017 Oslo Jazz Festival

Background information
- Born: 20 August 1959 (age 67); Bergen, Norway
- Origin: Norway
- Genres: Jazz
- Occupations: Musician, composer
- Instrument: Bass guitar
- Website: www.gautestoraas.no

Gaute Storaas (born 20 August 1959) is a Norwegian jazz musician (bass) and composer, and the older brother of jazz pianist Vigleik Storaas.

== Career ==
Storaas was born in Bergen and became well known for his innovative bass playing on the local rock and jazz scene. He started studies on the University of Bergen (political science and music). He attended Berklee College of Music, Boston, in 1984, and got his diploma in Arranging in 1986. Returned to Norway, (Oslo) and did all kinds of writing work. Arranging for shows, broadcasting, recording sessions, composing for commercials, commissioned films, TV idents, etc. Also found some time for music of his own, and won the Danish Radio Orchestra competition for younger composers in 1989, with the work "Ouverture #2".

The last decade, time has been split between composing for film and TV, and orchestral arranging for many of the most popular Norwegian artists. Internationally known are, among others, acts as diverse as the black metal band Dimmu Borgir, the singer Sissel Kyrkjebø, (the wordless voice of Titanic,) and young classical trumpet virtuoso Tine Thing Helseth.

Most recent film score is for the animated feature Elias and the Treasure of the Sea, which won the Nordic Film Composers Award 2011. The previous score, for The Royal PortKids and the TV series that it was based on, Abdias: The Little Tugboat, (nominated for Emmy 2006), was given the Edvard Prize 2007, TONOs prestigious composer award.

In 2007 Storaas composed a full-blown orchestral score for the animated feature Elias and the Royal Yacht. (Nominated for best Norwegian filmscore 2007) Prior to that, scored the TV series Elias, the little Rescue Boat, which was nominated for Emmy, and is sold to about 15 countries. The CD with music from the show was nominated for Spellemannprisen, (the Norwegian grammy) 2011. Scored movies as diverse as the romantic comedy The Woman of my Life, and the dark documentary Boomerang, (about police violence.)

Best known work is probably all the ident-music for the launch of TV2, the biggest commercial TV channel in Norway, back in 1992. Most of it ran for 12 years, and some is still on the air. A new, continuing series of high-profile idents started in 2003.

Music for a lot of short films, industrials, computer games, theatre music, occasional concert pieces and around 200 TV-commercials (most all of them in the first part of the 1990s).

Extensive arranging work, mainly string or orchestral, for the recordings of many of the most popular Norwegian artists. Some that may be known internationally are the rock acts Dimmu Borgir and Turbonegro, Sissel Kyrkjebø, M2M, Espen Lind and the musical Sophies World. A lot of arranging for the 52 member Norwegian Radio Orchestra, for concerts and TV-productions.

On TONO's (the Norwegian equivalent of PRS) board of musical experts from 1996 to 2005. Chairman for 4 years. Norwegian representative of FFACE (Federation of Film and Audiovisual Composers of Europe.)

== Honors ==
- Won the Danish Radio Orchestra competition for younger composers in 1989, with the work ouverture #2.
- Was awarded Edvard Prize 2007 fikk han Tonos for filmmusikken til Elias og kongeskipet
- Kanonprisen best Norwegian filmscore 2010
- Nordic Film Composers Award 2011
- Moët & Chandon Grand Scores 2017 for Best Orchestral Score for the film score to "En mann ved navn Ove"

== Works ==
Composer of music to films and TV-series
- Boomerang Cinema Documentary, directed by Trond Kvist/Gunnar Vikene. Montage film 1995
- Bak din Rygg (Cinema Documentary/TV-series, directed by Aslaug Holm) Rubicon/TV2, 1995
- Edle Dråper (Torkjel Berulfsens Documentary series on alcohol, directed by Truels Zeiner Henriksen.) NRK 2000. (Gullrutevinner x 2)
- Underveis (Series for young people, 4 episodes, directed Morten Hovland.) Fabelaktiv/NRK 2001
- Far & Sønn (TV-series, sitcom) Rubicon/TV2 2002
- Gnottene (Children's TV series, 23 episodes) Fabelaktiv/Nordmagi 2003 (shown on NRK, SR, DR)
- Drømmen om Norge (TV series the recent Norwegian history), directed by Truels Zeiner Henriksen NRK, 2005 (Nominated for the Gullruten)
- Kvinnen i mitt liv (Romantic comedy), regi Alexander Eik. Filmkameratene 2003
- Elias, den lille redningsskøyta (Animert TV-serie, 26 episodes), directed by Espen Fyksen. *Filmkameratene 2005 (Emmy nominated)
- Elias og kongeskipet (Animated film, director Espen Fyksen and Lise Osvoll) Filmkameratene 2007 (Nominated for Amandaprisen)
- Elias, den lille redningsskøyta (Series 2,13 episodes, director Lise Osvoll) Filmkameratene 2008
Composer of music to short films
- NY is for lovers (short film, 1988)
- The spirit of 94 (International presentation film for Lillehammer Olympics) Reel Image 1991
- Music for a part missions around 200 films and commercials, most between 1990 and 95
- Mal (director Hilde Rognskog) 1993
- Nils Klipper seg (director Bjørn Rørvik) 1996
- Hammerhaien (director Eva Dahr, part of the movie Pust på meg) Norsk Film 1997
- Millers bod (director Bjørn Rørvik) 2000
- Himmelstormeren (director Sara Johnsen) 2000
- Hormoner og andre demoner (director Sara Johnsen) 2001
- Hotellrommet (director Torstein Bieler Østtvedt) Filmkameratene 2002
- Elevkonsert (director Jan Otto Ertesvåg) 2008
- Ninas barn (director Nina Grünfeld) 2015
Composer of Program Profiles for TV
- Musikkprofil TV2 Music for all the TV2's own vignettes. 1992-2004 (the film vignettes and Document 2 are still on the air)
- Brennpunkt (Vignette musikk) magazine program, NRK 1995
- Sentrum (Vignette musikk) magazine program, TV2 1997
- Rikets tilstand (Vignette musikk) magazine program, TV2 1999
- Spillerom (Vignette musikk) magazine program, NRK2, 2000
- Lørdagskommisjonen (Vignette musikk) magazine program, TV2 2001
- Profilvignetter, TV2 (Series after every 100 small "stamps" in/out of advertising blocks) TV2. 2003,4,5,6...
- Kvitt eller Dobbelt total refurbishment of the old vignette, as well as new music, recorded with KORK, NRK 2006
- TV2 Filmkanalen Full channel profile, 2006
Composer of music to Multimedia and Computer games
- Norge etter Krigen VG in time and space, 1995
- Josefine, Pinjata 1996
- Josefine på ferie Pinjata 1997 (Nominated for Europrix 1998)
- Josefine på skolen Pinjata 1998
- Josefine og gjengen Pinjata AS 1999
- Vinter i Mummidalen prod. E-press/wsoy 2000 (Finnish award for best children's products in 2000, and the international multimedia award Prix Mobius)
- Ungene i gata Minimedia 2005
- Elias - Operasjon Lunvik Panvision 2006
- Reven og grisungen Minimedia 2007
Arranger and/or producer of Musical Records
- Egil Eldøen Egil Eldøen (arranger and co-producer) Sonet 1989
- Dronning Mauds Land Noe som har hendt (Strykearr, 3 låter) KKV 1992
- Kjell Karlsen "Seier´n er vår" OL-sang. Arrangør & produsent. 1994
- Dronning Mauds Land "Tiden kler seg naken" (Strykearr, 4 låter) KKV 1994
- Tim Scott McConnell. "Deceivers & Believers" (Stryk/båsearr, 4 låter Wea 1994
- Grethe Svendsen "Your beauty" (Strykearr, 1 låt) BMG, 1995
- Marit & Marion (senere M2M)""synger kjente barnesanger" arr 3 låter EMI 1996
- Elisabeth Andreassen "Bettans jul" Arr 2 låter Polygram 1996
- Baba Nation "Love Xpress" strykearr, 3 låter. Sony Music 1996
- Bretteville "In Time" Strykearr 3 låter Sonet 1996
- Di Derre "Gym" Strykearr, dirigent 3 låter Sonet 1996
- Josefine synger sanger. Fra de populære Josefinespillene. (Komponist, arrangør, produsent) Barneselskapet 1997
- Wenche Myhre Vannmann (arranger) Polygram 1997
- Elisabeth Andreassen Så skimrande varaldrig havet (arr, 2 låter) Polygram 1997
- Henning Kvitnes "Evig eies kun et dårlig rykte" (Strykearr, 2 låter) Norske Gram 1997
- Torhild Sivertsen "Out of the blue" (Strykearr, dirigent, 3 låter) Sony Music 1997
- Jan Werner "Inner Secrets" (Strykearr, dirigent, 6 låter. Polydor 1997
- Espen Lind "Red" (Strykearr, dirigent 4 låter, bla hiten "When Suzannah cries"). Trippel spellemannspris, Universal 1997
- Div Artister Ri stormen av Offisiell norsk OL-sang. (Strykearr) 1998
- Grace Grace (strykearr, 1 låt) Sony music 1998
- Babel Fish Babel Fish (Synth arr, 5 låter) Warner, 1998
- Odd Børretzen and Anita Skorgan "Våre beste barnesanger 4". (Arrangør, co-produsent.) Spellemannsnominert. Grappa 1998.
- Carola, Morten Harket and others, "Sophies World". Musikk Gisle Kverndokk. (8 av 9 orkesterarrangementer, produsent, 3 låter.) Universal 1998.
- Div artister Grease Cast-album fra Tom Sterris 99-produksjon.(Arrangør, co-produsent. Grappa 1999
- Lars Fredriksen "Pleased to meet you" (Strykearr, 3 låter) Universal 1999
- Baba Nation Too Bad (Strykearr, dirigent, 3 låter) Sony Music 1999
- Jan Werner Music of the night (Orkesterarr, dirigent, hele platen) Polydor 1999
- Jahn Teigen Magnet (String Arrangements, 3 låter, dirigent.) EMI 1999
- Jan Eggum Deilig (Strykearr 2 låter) Grappa 1999
- Bjørn Eidsvåg Tapt uskyld (String Arrangements, conductor, 3 låter) Metropol music1999
- Trøste og Bære Med promp og prakt Marching band arrangements Tylden 2000
- Emilia Emilia (Swedish artist). (String Arrangements, conductor 2 songs) Polar/Universal 2000
- Espen Lind This is pop music (Orchestra Arrangements, conductor, 3 songs) Universal 2000.
- Sissel Kyrkjebø "All good things" (String Arrangements, conductor, 4 låter) Universal 2000
- M2M "Shades of purple", (String Arrangements, conductor, 1 song) Warner music 2000
- New Jordal Swingers "Indigo" (String Arrangements, 1 song) Tylden 2001
- Sølvguttene with guests (Morten Harket, Ole Edvard Antonsen and others) Christmas choir (Arranger, 6 Christmas songs) Universal 2001
- Dimmu Borgir Puritanical Euphoric Misanthropia (String Arrangements, conductor) Nuclear Blast 2001. Spellemannspris.
- Dream Evil Dragonslayer (Swedish heavy metal) Strykearr, dirigent 2 låter Century Media records, 2001
- Lasse Kroner Lasse Kroner (Strykearr, dirigent 2 låter), 4 vision (Sverige), 2001
- Wenche Myhre Du & jeg & vi to og mange flere (Arranger, producer) nominated for the Spellemannpris, Golden record, Barneselskapet 2001
- Vidar Busk Venus, Texas. Strykearr, dirigent. Warner 2001 Spellemannsnominert
- Den norske operas kor & orkester Hjem til Jul. Arr 3 låter, Norske Gram 2002
- Finn Kalvik Klassisk Kalvik (Arrangør, fullt symfoniorkester 3 låter) DaWorks 2002
- Hot club de Norvege/Tromsø symfoniorkester "White Night Stories" Jon Larsens stringswingsuite, blåst opp fra 6 til 88 strenger av undertegnede. Hot club records 2002
- Lava Polarity (Strykearr, dirigent 2 låter) Tylden 2003.
- DDE Vi e konga (Strykearr, dirigent 3 låter) Buy buy records, 2003.
- Gnottene. Sangene fra serien (arranger and producer) Panvision 2003
- Notodden Bluesband with Torhild Sivertsen Soul Food (Strings arr, 1 tune) Bluestown Records 2003.
- Dimmu Borgir Death Cult Armageddon (Orchestral arrangements) Bone Hard rock band and a 50-man strong City of Prague Philharmonic. Nuclear Blast 2003. Spellemannpris.
- Jessica Fletchers Less sophistication (strykarr, 2 låter) Redeye Distribution, 2005
- Elias Musikken fra TV-serien. (Composer, arranger, producer). Barneselskapet 2005. Spellemannsnominert
- Turbonegro Party Animals (Arranger, 2 tunes) Full symphony orchestra. (KORK) Burning Heart Records, 2005
- Frelsesarmens (The Salvation Army) Christmas album 2006
- Christian Ingebrigtsen Paint Christmas White Arr 1 tune, Czech National Symphony Orchestra
- Lars Martin Myhre Stengetid? (Strings arr., 2 tunes) Tylden 2006.
- Di Derre Di beste med Di Derre (Strings arr., 1 new tune) Sonet/Universal 2006
- Elvira Nikolaisen Quiet Exit (Strings/winds arr., 4 tunes) Sony/bmg 2006. Spellemannsnominert.
- Jan Eggum Arranged 2 tunes for Bergen Philharmonic Orchestra, høsten 2007
- Ina Best Of Me (String Arrangement, conductor, 5 tunes) TVT records (USA) 2007
Composer of music for Theatre
- Trollmannen fra Oz Regi Kenneth Dean 1 ny sang. Oslo nye dukketeater 2007
- Tiggerprinen Rogaland Teaters hovedforestilling våren 2001
- Dr Irrwitzers testamente Nordland dukketeaterverksted 2000
- Sinbad sjøfareren Kenneth Dean Production, Det åpne teater 1999
- Grease Tom Sterri, regi Wayne mcKnight (Samtlige musikkarrangementer) 1999
- Sofies Verden (Så vidt innom som arrangør) 1999
- Frykt Nordland Dukketeaterverksted, 1998
- Aladdin Teater X, regi Kenneth Dean, premiere 1995, turnert i flere år, siste oppførelse var som gjestespill på DNS i Bergen, hele høsten 2000.
- Gengangere Kenneth Deans meget spesielle versjon av denne klassikeren, Teater X 1995
Composer of Concert music
- 16:30 bestilt av det norske brassensemble med Ole Edvard Antonsen som soloist, uroppført under festivalen "Farsund i konsert" 1998.
- Hymne for obo og orkester finalist i nordisk komposisjonskonkurranse i Helsinki, 1990
- Ouverture #2 for symfoniorkester & band. Vinner av Danmarks Radios "Komponisternes underholdningsmusikpris" 1989.
- Impressions, Bright of black, Karthago, Blustein, alle oppført av NRK´s radiostorband, 1987-90.
As arranger/orchestrator
- Arrangert Jon Erik Kaadas "Music for Moviebikers" for Rotterdam Chamber Orchestra, våren 2007.
- Mye arbeid for Kringkastingsorkesteret (KORK) bla ved nobelkonsertene i 99 (Espen Lind), og 2002, (Sissel)
- Jon Larsens "White Night Stories" for jazzkvintett og strykere, også innspilt på plate (2002)

== Discography ==
Solo
- 2007: Elias Og Kongeskipet (Barneselskapet)
With Jan Bang, Erik Honoré, and Arve Henriksen
- 2013: Victoria (Jazzland)
