= Nina Grünfeld =

Norwegian film director and author (born 19669)

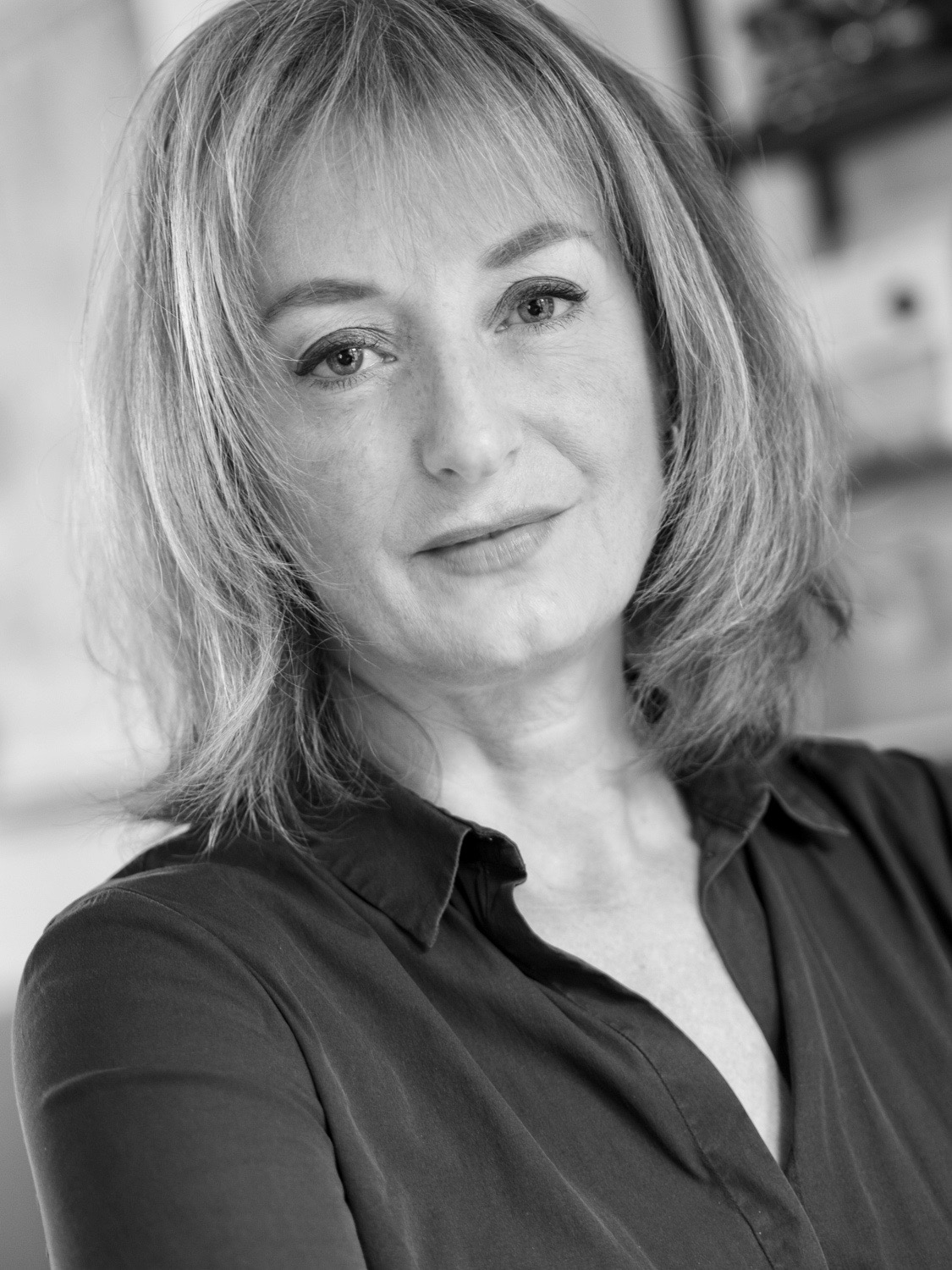
- Born: July 27, 1966 (age 59)
- Occupations: Film director and author
- Father: Berthold Grünfeld

Nina Frederikke Grünfeld (born July 27, 1966) is a Norwegian film director and author, and the former head of the Norwegian Film Directors (NFR) trade union.

== Career ==
Grünfeld studied mass communication, Eastern European studies, film, and TV in Oslo, and she has a bachelor's degree in film directing from the Swedish Institute of Dramatic Art in Stockholm. She is a professor at the Inland Norway University of Applied Sciences. She was previously head of research and development at the Westerdals School of Communication. Grünfeld has held board positions in a number of art and cultural institutions. She owns and runs the film production company Gründer Film in Oslo.

In 2015, Grünfeld launched the charitable jewelry project Coexista at the Nobel Peace Center in Oslo. The profit from sales went to combating Islamophobia, anti-Semitism, and extremism. On January 12, 2019, Nina Grünfeld received the Blanche Major Reconciliation Award for her work.

Two of Grünfeld's films are documentaries about her father, the psychiatrist Berthold Grünfeld. The first is about his childhood and background story, and the other about his last years of life. Her documentary film Ninas barn, which has also been published in book form, is about the Jewish Children's Home in Oslo during the Second World War. Her father was one of the children there. Nina Grünfeld is named after the manager Nina Hasvoll, who became like a mother to the children at the orphanage.

In her documentary series Alexia vs. verden (Alexia vs. the World), Grünfeld followed the controversial writer Alexia Bohwim. The film project started in 2014 and premiered on TV3 on June 11, 2018. The project was supported by the Norwegian Film Institute. Grünfeld has stated to the media that she aims to follow Bohwim for another 10 to 15 years. In 2019, she worked on a short documentary about a Jewish prayer book that disappeared during the Second World War, and was then found by a Christian priest and handed over in 2015 to the Jewish Community in Oslo. In 2020, she published the book Frida – Min ukjente farmors krig (Frida: My Unknown Grandmother's War). The book is about her grandmother, who was a poor Jewish woman and prostitute in Czechoslovakia, and who was deported to Auschwitz and killed at the Ravensbrück concentration camp in April 1945.

== Books ==
- Frida – Min ukjente farmors krig (Frida: My Unknown Grandmother's War; Aschehoug, 2020)
- Ninas barn – fortellingen om det jødiske barnehjemmet i Oslo (Nina's Children: The Story of the Jewish Children's Home in Oslo; Kagge Forlag, 2015)

== Films and television productions ==
- 1993: Lang og tro tjeneste, short film
- 1996: Syndig sommer, short film
- 1996–2000: Familiesagaen de syv søstre, TV drama series (as director of one of several episodes)
- 1998: Mellom min mors ben, short film
- 2002: Mens du står utenfor, short film
- 2005: Grünfeld – ukjent opphav, documentary (TV2)
- 2008: Den døende doktoren, documentary (TV2)
- 2015: Ninas barn, documentary (NRK)
- 2018: Alexia vs. verden, TV and web series (TV3/Viafree)
- 2021: Cheiderboken, animated short documentary
