= Lomnice (Brno-Country District) =

- Market town
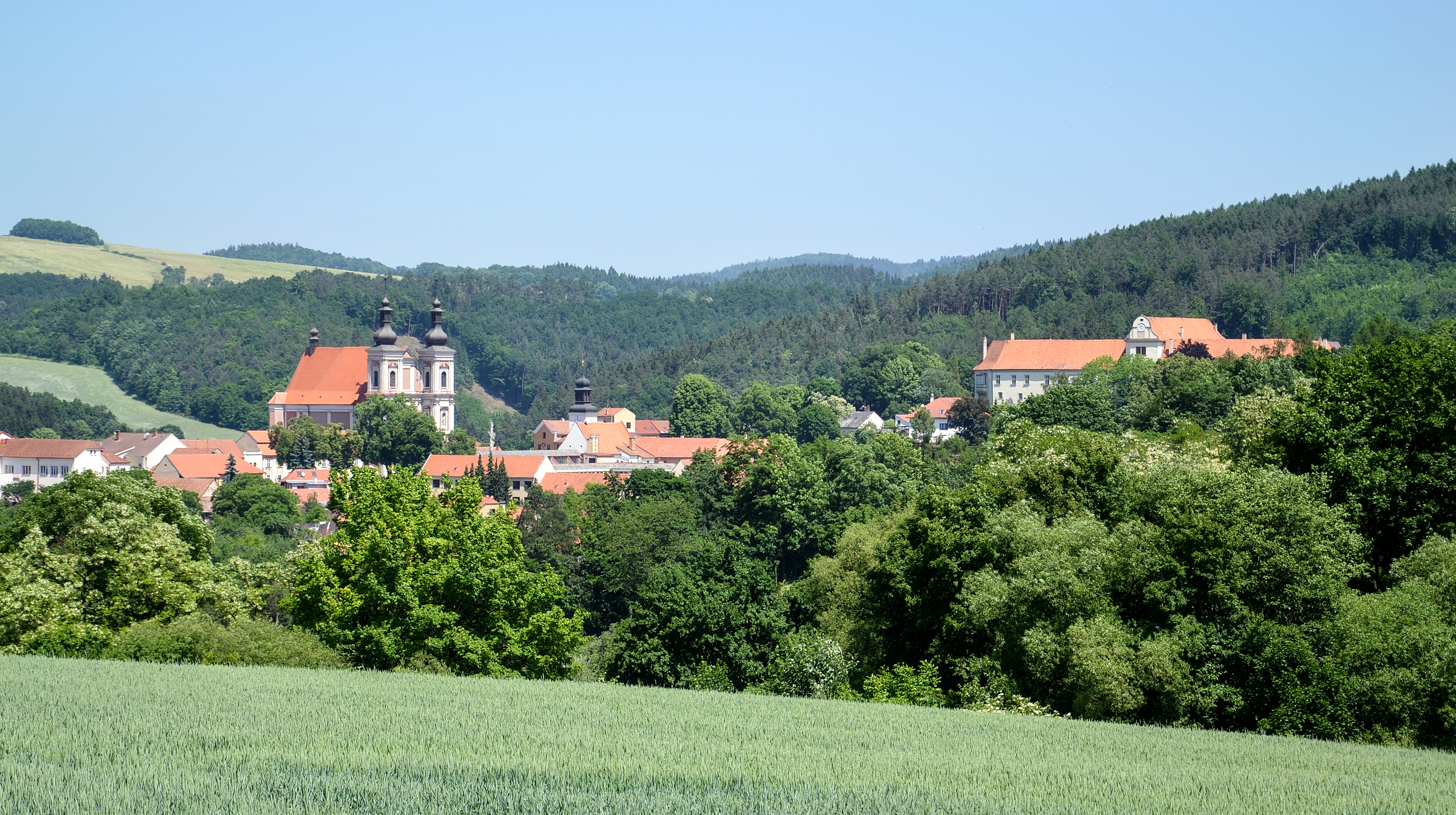
- Panorama of Lomnice

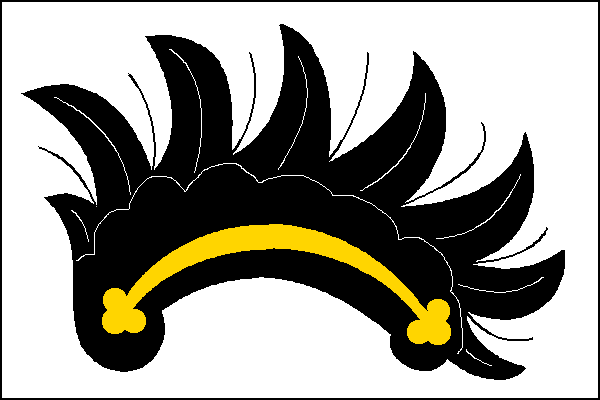
- Flag Coat of arms

- Location in the Czech Republic
- Coordinates: 49°24′17″N 16°24′49″E
- Country: Czech Republic
- Region: South Moravian
- District: Brno-Country
- First mentioned: 1265

Area
  - Total: 14.56 km^{2} (5.62 sq mi)
- Elevation: 368 m (1,207 ft)

Population (2026-01-01)
  - Total: 1,470
  - Density: 101/km^{2} (261/sq mi)
- Time zone: UTC+1 (CET)
  - Summer (DST): UTC+2 (CEST)
- Postal code: 679 23
- Website: www.lomnice.cz

Lomnice (Czech pronunciation: [ˈlomɲɪtsɛ]) is a market town in Brno-Country District in the South Moravian Region of the Czech Republic. It has about 1,500 inhabitants. The historic town centre is well preserved and is protected as an urban monument zone.

== Administrative division ==
Lomnice consists of four municipal parts (in brackets population according to the 2021 census):

- Lomnice (1,243)
- Brusná (74)
- Řepka (60)
- Veselí (48)

== Geography ==
Lomnice is located about 25 kilometres (16 mi) northwest of Brno. It lies in the Upper Svratka Highlands. The highest point is the hill Veselský chlum at 578 m (1,896 ft) above sea level. The built-up area lies above the Besének Stream, which flows across the municipal territory.

== History ==
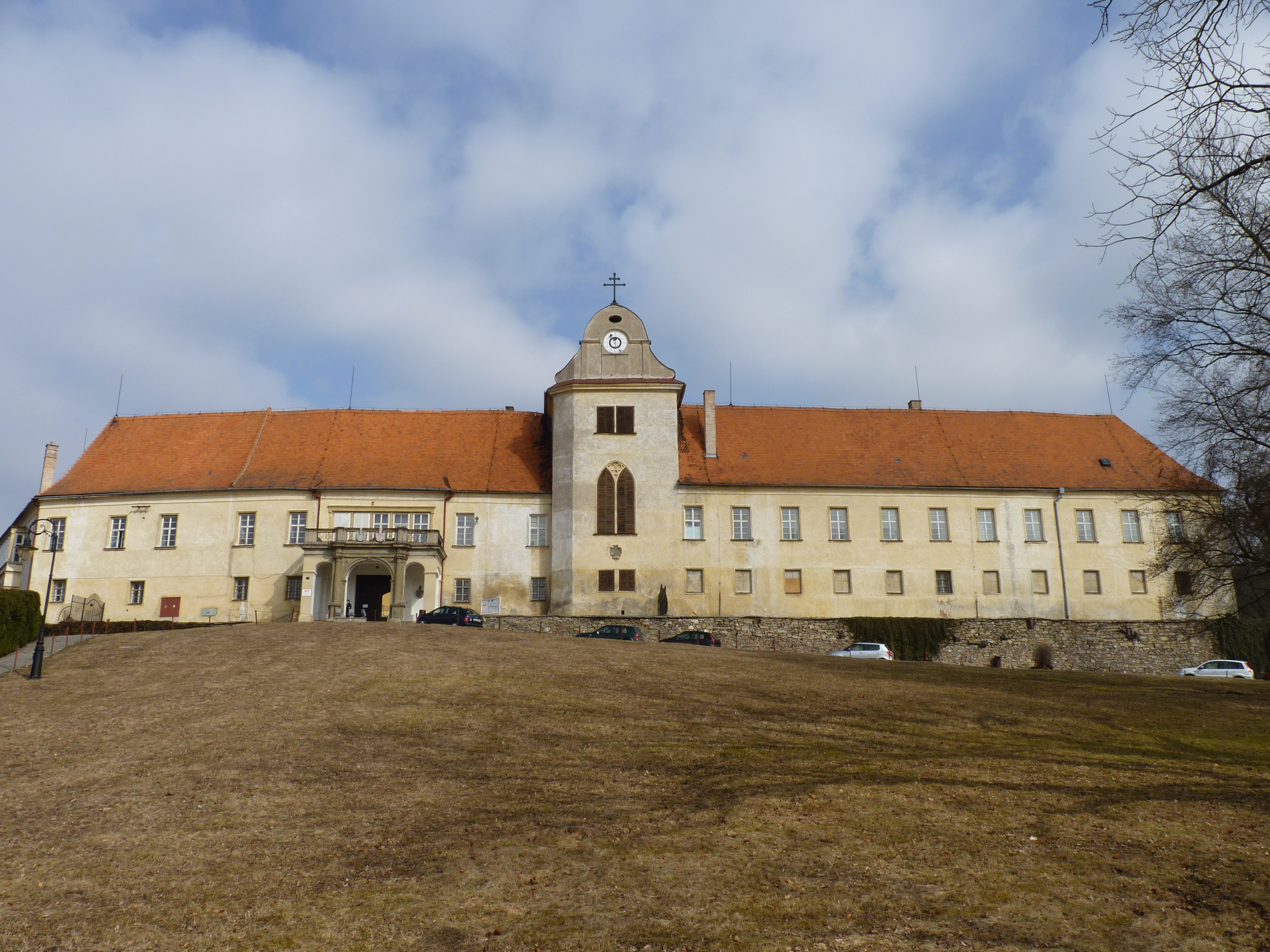
Lomnice Castle

The first written mention of Lomnice is from 1265 or 1281. A church consecrated to Saints John the Baptist and Vitus was mentioned here in 1407. In the 15th century, the settlement developed and in 1502, it was first referred to as a market town. Until 1570, Lomnice was ruled by the Lords of Lomnice.

Lomnice was inherited by the Zierotin family, who had rebuilt the Gothic castle from the 13th century into a Renaissance residence. In 1571, the Jewish population in Lomnice was first documented. After the manor changed hands several times in the following decades, it was bought by Count Gabriel Serényi in 1662. His son František Gabriel Serényi reorganised the economy, had completely rebuilt the castle in the Baroque style, had laid down a new planned urban concept, and had built a new large church and the town hall. The Serényi family owned Lomnice until the abolishment of manorialism. Properties of the Serényi family were confiscated in 1945.

== Demographics ==
Historical population

Year	Pop.	±%
1869	2,143	—
1880	2,063	−3.7%
1890	1,947	−5.6%
1900	1,872	−3.9%
1910	1,869	−0.2%

Year	Pop.	±%
1921	1,651	−11.7%
1930	1,629	−1.3%
1950	1,465	−10.1%
1961	1,407	−4.0%
1970	1,305	−7.2%

Year	Pop.	±%
1980	1,241	−4.9%
1991	1,202	−3.1%
2001	1,243	+3.4%
2011	1,317	+6.0%
2021	1,425	+8.2%

Source: Censuses

== Transport ==
There are no railways or major roads passing through the municipality.

== Sights ==
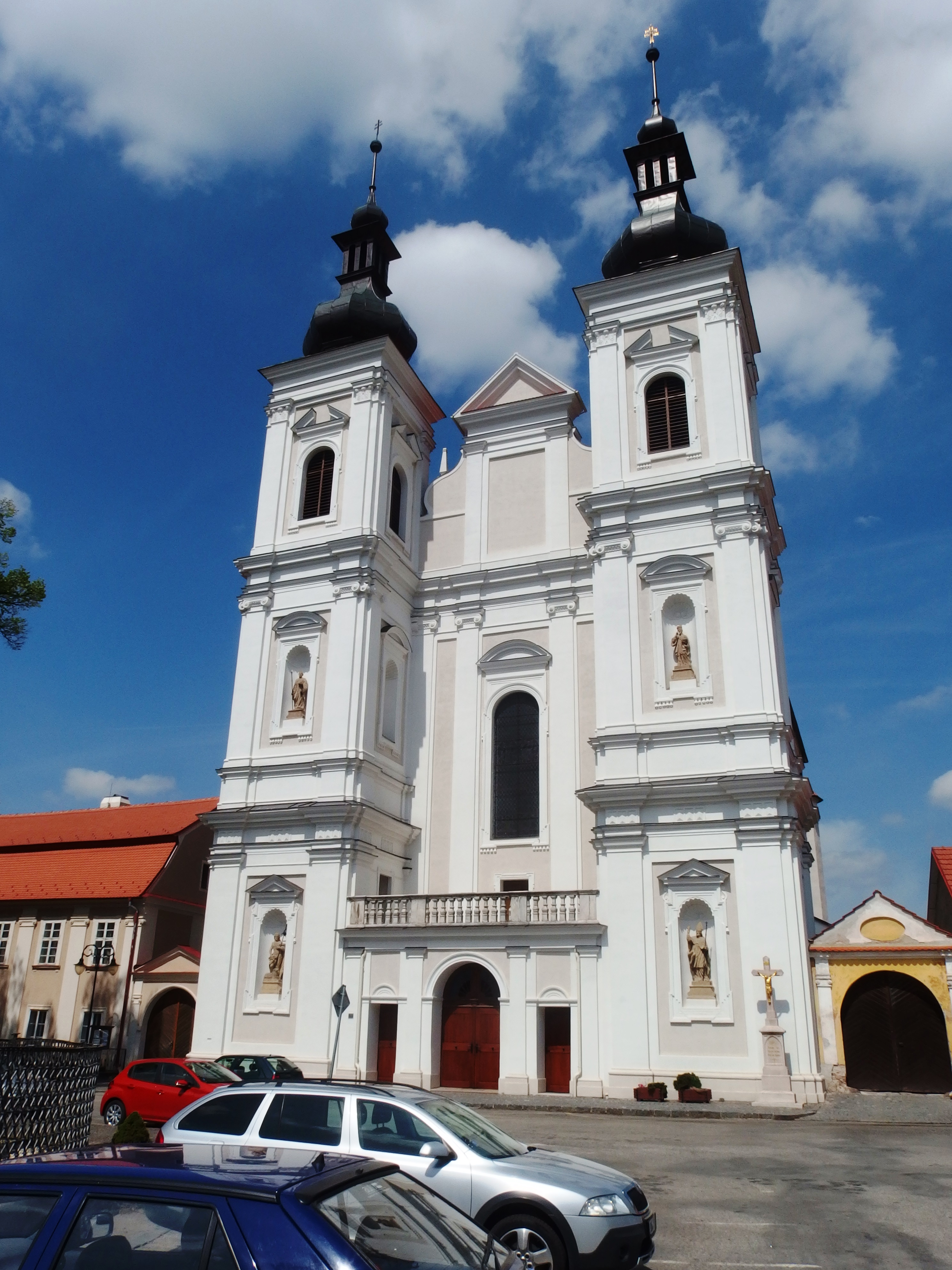
Church of the Visitation of Our Lady

The Church of the Visitation of Our Lady was built in the early Baroque style in 1669–1683. It is an architectonically valuable example of the Baroque style in Moravia.

The second notable landmark of the square is the town hall. It was built between 1669 and 1680. It has an advanced prismatic tower. In the middle of the town square there is a Marian column from 1709.

The castle is inaccessible to the public. It is surrounded by a forest, which is protected as a nature monument. The forest contains a unique neo-Gothic gazebo from the 19th century.

The synagogue was built in 1792–1794. Today it serves cultural and educational purposes.

== Notable people ==
- Leo Eitinger (1912–1996), Norwegian psychiatrist and author
