= Berthold Grünfeld =

Norwegian psychiatrist (1932–2007)

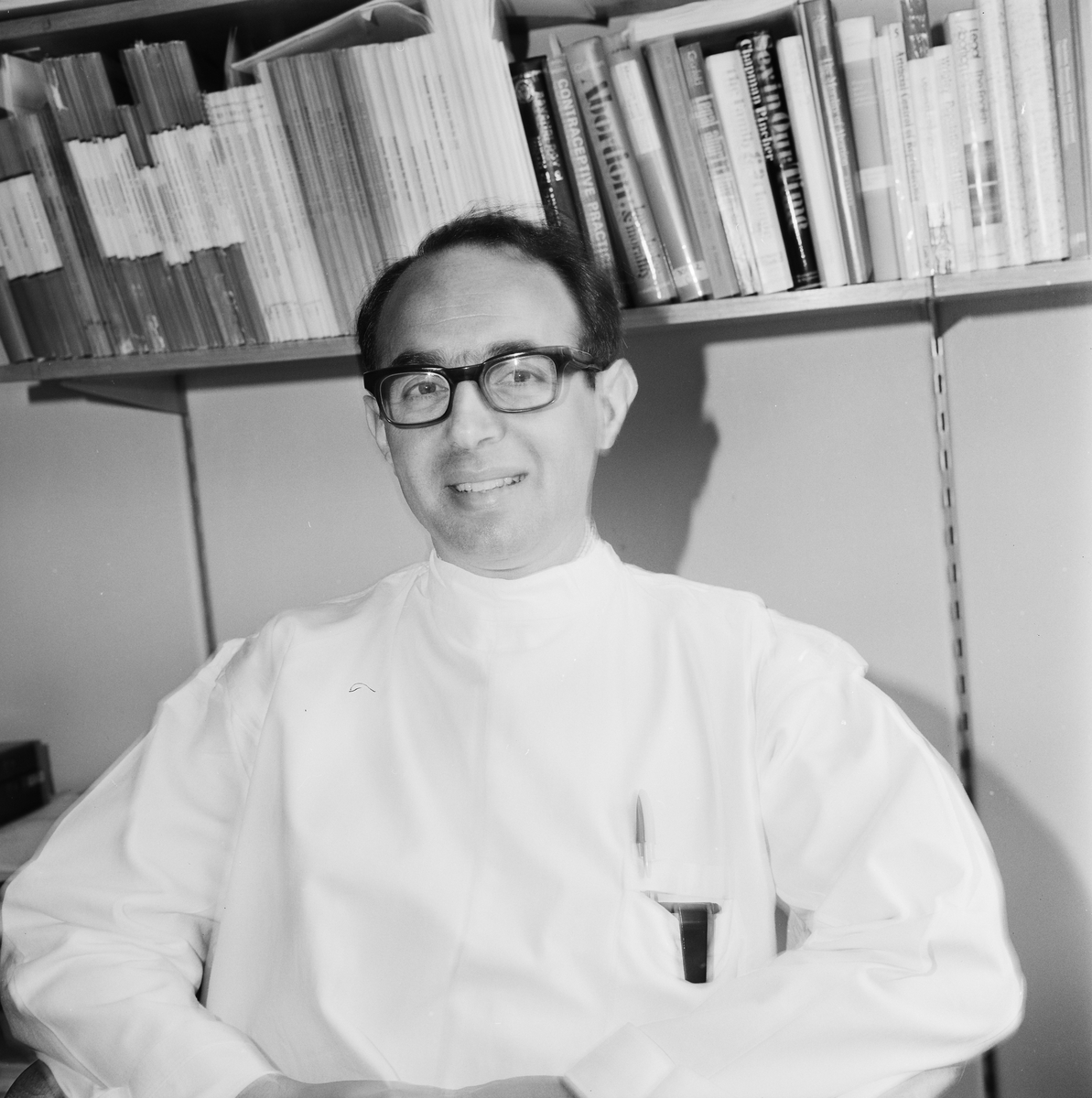
- Berthold Grünfeld in 1973
- Born: 22 January 1932; Bratislava, Czechoslovakia
- Died: 20 August 2007 (aged 75); Oslo, Norway
- Education: University of Oslo
- Scientific career
- Fields: Psychiatry and Sexology

Berthold Grünfeld (22 January 1932 – 20 August 2007) was a Norwegian psychiatrist, sexologist, and professor of social medicine at the University of Oslo. He was also a recognized expert in forensic psychiatry, often employed by Norwegian courts to examine insanity defense pleas.

== Biography ==
Grünfeld was born in Bratislava in what was then Czechoslovakia. In 1939, when he was seven, he and 34 other Jewish children were separated from their families in an attempt by Nansenhjelpen to rescue them from the early manifestations of the Holocaust. The group of children was sent by train to Norway via Berlin, after having been told they would never again see their parents.

Once in Norway, Grünfeld was first placed at the Jewish children's home in Oslo, then lived as a foster child with a Jewish family in Trondheim before returning to the orphanage. During the occupation of Norway, Grünfeld avoided capture and deportation by fleeing with members of the Norwegian Resistance in 1942 to neutral Sweden, where he stayed until the war ended. He returned to the children's home in 1946. The Jewish community funded his education.

Berthold Grünfeld earned his medical degree in 1960, when he also met his future wife Gunhild. He was awarded his doctorate in medicine in 1973 based on a dissertation on abortion. In 1993, he was made professor of social medicine at the University of Oslo.

Grünfeld was noted for his academic contributions within sexology, on the issues of abortion and euthanasia, and within forensic psychology. In addition to his advocacy and teaching, he acted as an expert witness in criminal cases, and as a consultant on human relations and sexology for Oslo Helseråd. His dissertation influenced the reform of abortion laws in Norway.

Grünfeld and his wife had three children and six grandchildren. In 2005, his daughter Nina Grünfeld made a film, Origin Unknown, about her efforts to research her father's background and heritage. Among other things, she found that his mother had worked as a prostitute and was murdered in the death camp at Sobibor.

== Awards and decorations ==
- Commander of The Royal Norwegian Order of St. Olav
