= Almanac X Alcron Prague =

Historic hotel in Czechia

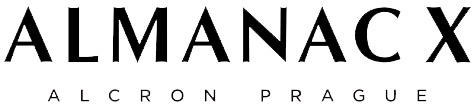

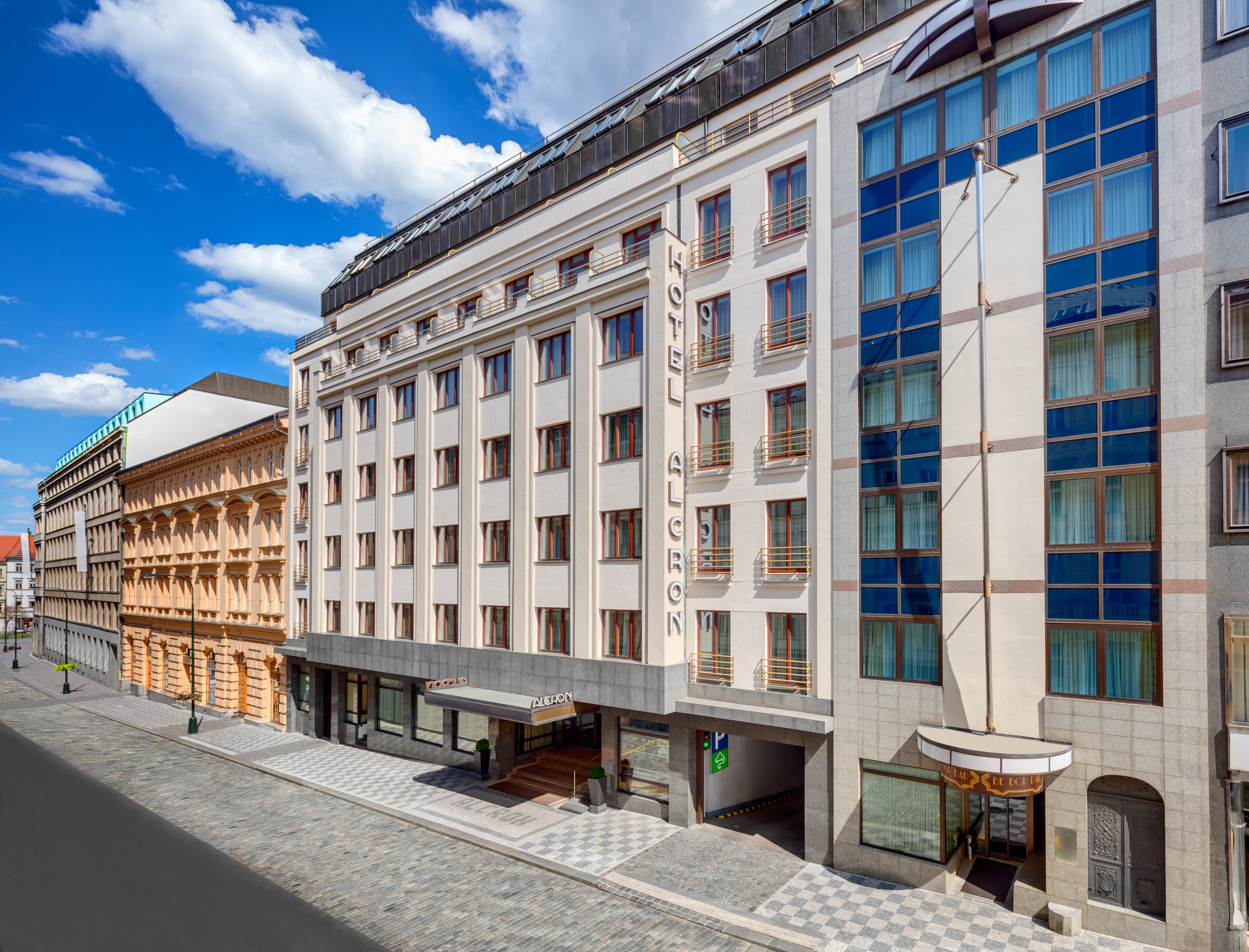
- Interactive map of the Almanac X Alcron Prague area
- Hotel chain: Almanac Hotels

General information
- Location: Štěpánská 623 /40, Prague, Czech Republic, 110 00
- Coordinates: 50°4′47″N 14°25′35″E
- Opening: 1932
- Owner: Crown WSF
- Operator: Almanac Hotels

Design and construction
- Architect: Alois Krofta

Other information
- Number of rooms: 204
- Number of suites: 26
- Number of restaurants: 2
- Number of bars: 1
- Parking: yes

Website
- almanachotels.com/praguex

The Almanac X Alcron Prague is a historic hotel opened in 1932 as the Hotel Alcron, located in the Czech capital of Prague on Štěpánská, just off Wenceslas Square.

== History ==
The Hotel Alcron was constructed by its owner/architect Alois Krofta, a local businessman, and opened in 1932. Krofta named the hotel after himself, taking the first two letters of his first and last names and adding an "n" to match the Alcron, a boat from Greek mythology. Pre-WWII guests included Charlie Chaplin and Winston Churchill, while Joachim von Ribbentrop and Karl Hermann Frank stayed at the hotel during the German occupation of Czechoslovakia. In 1948, the Alcron was nationalized by the new communist government.

Following the fall of communism, the hotel closed in 1990, and the Krofta family filed claims for restitution in 1992. A legal battle ensued between two of Krofta's ex-wives and one of their daughters. The three women were eventually each given 1/3 ownership, which they each sold in 1995 to an Austrian-based firm, Crown WSF Ltd. In 1996, the new owners contracted Radisson SAS Hotels to manage the property upon its reopening. It was completely rebuilt and modernized at great expense, with the historic public rooms restored to their original Art Deco style.

The hotel reopened on 1 August 1998 as the Radisson SAS Hotel Prague. Crown secured the right to use the Alcron name two years later, and the property was renamed Radisson SAS Alcron Hotel. It was again renovated in 2008. The hotel was renamed Radisson Blu Alcron Hotel in 2009, when the Radisson SAS partnership ended. After twenty years of management by Radisson, the Alcron Hotel became independent and was renamed Alcron Hotel Prague on 1 January 2019.

The hotel closed in January 2022 for a €20 million renovation and reopened in March 2023 as Almanac X Prague, part of the Barcelona-based Almanac Hotels chain. It regained its historic name as Almanac X Alcron Prague a few months later.
