= Jewish Children's Home in Oslo =

Historic children's home

The Jewish Children's Home in Oslo was established in 1939 under the auspices of Nansenhjelpen, the Nansen Aid, a humanitarian organization established in 1936 by Odd Nansen, the son of Nobel Peace Prize laureate Fridtjof Nansen. It was intended as a safe haven for Jewish children during the Holocaust, however all of the children eventually had to flee to avoid deportation when Norway itself was occupied by Nazi Germany during World War II.

== Origin ==
With the rise of the Nazi party, Nansenhjelpen, the Nansen Aid, was established in 1936 to help get vulnerable groups out of Central Europe and into Norway. Originally the group was stationed in Austria, but after Austria's annexation with Germany (the Anschluss), the group moved to Czechoslovakia.

Through the work of recently arrived psychiatrist Leo Eitinger and Nora Lustig (who was later detained, deported, and immediately murdered in Auschwitz concentration camp) from Brno, Nansenhjelpen applied on humanitarian grounds to admit 100 Czech Jewish children who otherwise faced a grim future under the Nazi regime. The ministry of justice only reluctantly approved the application for a 22 children, on the grounds that it would be "difficult to get rid of them."

The Nansen Aid brought 41 Jewish child refugees, aged 6–7 years old, from Vienna (known as Wienerbarna, "the Vienna children"), to Norway in June 1938 on the pretext of a 3-month summer vacation with the Norwegian Jewish community at the Jewish community's cabin at Skui in Bærum. After the summer, with the political situation in Austria not improving, a new plan was needed. 6 parents decided to bring their children back to Vienna, all of whom were killed. The remaining children were linked to local Jewish families as "foster children," (allowing them to stay in Norway) and moved into rented facilities in Industrigaten and finally into an apartment the Jewish community had acquired at Holbergsgate 21 in Oslo.

The first director of the orphanage, Nina Hasvoll (née Hackel), was recruited by Norwegian psychiatrist Nic Waal after they had become acquainted in Berlin while attending the Kinderseminar (Seminar on Children) run by Wilhelm Reich. Hasvoll lived with the children in the apartment. Nansen Aid board member Sigrid Helliesen Lund was also active in establishing the home.

== Children of the orphanage ==
In 1938 the apartment it was only the remaining 15 children from Vienna. Although, one of the children never lived in the orphanage as his foster family believed it was better for him to live privately. On November 26, 1942, he was arrested with his foster family, the Feinbergs, deported to Auschwitz on December 1, 1942, where he was immediately killed in the Auschwitz Gas chamber.

Later on, two boys from Czechoslovakia arrived to the orphanage, one of them was Berthold Grünfeld.

A Norwegian 16 year old also lived at the orphanage for a time due to difficult conditions at home. In the Fall he moved back with his parents. He was arrested with his father and sent to Auschwitz/Birkenau on November 26, 1942. Both the boy and his father were killed there.

By the time the Nazi authorities ordered the detention and deportation of all Jews in Norway in November 1942, there were nine boys and five girls in the home.

== Nazi occupation of Norway and escape ==
When Norway was occupied by Nazi Germany, conditions progressively worsened for the Norwegian Jewish community in general and also for the inhabitants of the Jewish children's home. Though Sigrid Helliesen Lund had the foresight to burn the entire list of Czech Jewish refugees on April 9, 1940, German and Quisling authorities eventually caught up with the home.

Hasvoll had a J in her identification papers, marking her as a Jew. After October 26, 1942, she reported to the Hegdehaugen Police Station every day. During this period, Hasvoll and Waal began to plan an escape. Waal sent the oldest boy at the orphanage, Siegmund Korn, with NOK 10,000 in his boots to the husband of the orphanage's housekeeper, Gudrun, to arrange the escape. Gudrun lived in Grorud and was part of the resistance network.

On November 25, 1942, Helliesen Lund received a tip that the Nazis were coming to take away Jewish Children in Norway, including in the orphanage. Waal also received a similar tip.

On November 26, 1942, Hasvoll woke up the children of the orphanage early telling them to wear 2 pairs of their finest clothing, including underwear, socks, jackets, etc. The group snuck out of the back stairs of the building, with Waal waiting for them in the street. The youngest children went with Waal and brought them to a friend Gerda Tanberg. Then Waal brought the older children, narrowly avoiding confrontation with the police.

14 children made it to Tanberg's house where they were on strict rations and had to crawl to move around, all the while keeping very silent as to not alert anyone to their presence. Helliesen Lund helped Tanberg receive ration cards and maintain communication with Hasvoll and Waal.

The children were then driven to Sweden by members of the resistance movement including Martin Solvang. When they arrived in Sweden they were taken to a military detention center, and then to a hospital.

All 14 children survived the Holocaust and subsequently found new homes in Norway, Sweden, Argentina, the United Kingdom, and the United States. In the summer of 2007, all were still alive.

== Recognition ==
Of those who participated in the rescue effort, seven were honored as being among the Righteous among the Nations through Yad Vashem in 2006:

- Caroline (Nic) Waal, who orchestrated the escape, relying on her personal network of friends and family.
- Nina Hasvoll, the director of the orphanage.
- Gerda Tanberg, who hid the children in her second floor apartment in Ullern.
- Martin Solvang, a taxi driver who was very active in the underground railroad to Sweden, and drove the children to Elverum.
- Ola Rauken, a border guide, who took the children into his farm and walked them 17 kilometers toward the border.
- Ola Breisjøberget, who took them across the border.
- Sigrid Helliesen Lund, a member of Sivorg who dedicated herself from the outset to saving the children's lives, planning the escape and arranging for provisions.

See Norwegian Righteous Among the Nations for a complete list of Norwegians recognized.

In 2015, a movie was created depicting Hasvoll's role in World War II called Ninas barn.
