= Nansenhjelpen =

Norwegian humanitarian organisation

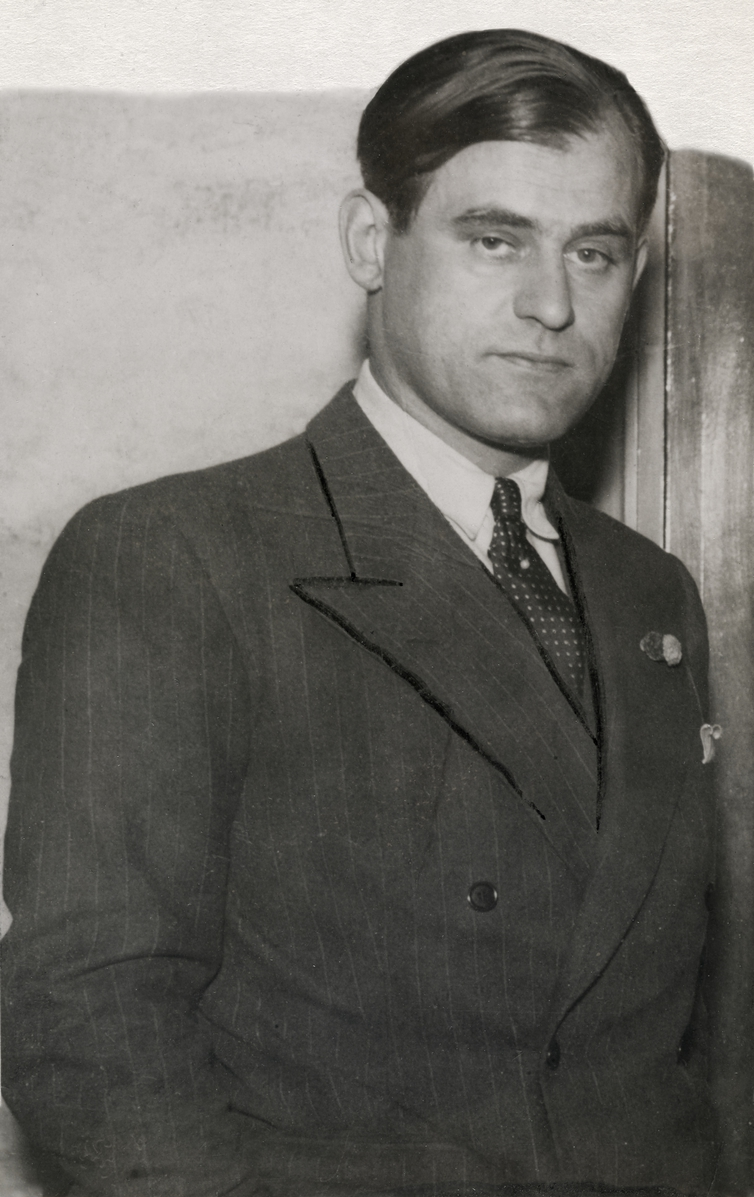
Photograph of Odd Nansen, founder

Nansenhjelpen (formally called Nansen Hjelp, variously called the Nansen Relief in English and Nansenhilfe in German) was a Norwegian humanitarian organization founded by Odd Nansen in 1936 to provide safe haven and assistance in Norway for Jewish refugees from areas in Europe under Nazi control. It was formally disbanded in 1945, but effectively ceased operations in late 1942, after all Jews in Norway had been deported, been murdered, or fled into Sweden.

== Founding ==
Although a few Norwegian individuals had made efforts to save Jews from Nazi persecution in Europe, Norwegian humanitarian organizations, such as that founded by Landsorganisasjonen and the Communist party had focused primarily on helping political refugees. It was a professor of German at the University of Oslo, Fredrik Paasche, who approached architect Odd Nansen, the son of famed scientific explorer and Nobel Peace laureate Fridtjof Nansen to lend his name to an organization dedicated to rescuing Jews. When another Nobel Peace laureate, Christian Lange and foreign minister Halvdan Koht added their voices to Paasche's, Nansen agreed to form the organization.

The organization was small from the onset: Tove Filseth became its full-time secretary, Sigrid Helliesen Lund was named board member and field operative, attorney Fredrik Helweg Winsnes, and professors Georg Morgenstierne and Edgar Schieldrop also became board members.

More than most organizations, the organization needed significant funds to be successful. The Norwegian government insisted on a NOK 1,000 deposit for each refugee to ensure that they wouldn't be a burden to the state, and refused to grant work permits for them. The labor unions similarly opposed any immigration of individuals who might accept employment. Some refugees nevertheless found unauthorized and secret employment.

== Campaign in Prague ==
Already in January 1939, Nansen sent Ms. Filseth and his own wife Kari to establish a field office in Prague. The head of the Norwegian passport office, Leif Ragnvald Konstad, accompanied them and issued entry visas for precisely the number of refugees the organization could afford to sponsor, excluding "weak and sick" individuals from consideration. Meanwhile, Nansen and Paasche continued their fund-raising activities, where they had to overcome both Depression-era frugality and considerable antisemitism. Several donors agreed to support the organization on the condition that their contribution would not benefit Jews. Nansen himself traveled to Prague with Konstad, once again, and quickly filled the quota provided for by the funds raised.

Konstad once again returned to Norway, but Nansen remained in Prague to pre-process applications and help in any other way he could. In addition to their office, the three did much work from the Hotel Esplanade. During this time, Czech army physician Leo Eitinger volunteered to help and soon became a refugee as well. The Nansens and Filseth also built contacts throughout the city, including with the Red Cross and Quaker relief organizations.

In March 1939, the three Norwegians responded to a call from contacts in Bratislava that antisemitic attacks in Slovakia had escalated with the independence from the Czech central government and ascent of Monsignor Jozef Tiso. On the day of their arrival, the Nansens and Filseth witnessed first hand brutality against Jews at the hands of the Hlinka Guard, and Odd Nansen managed to arrange a meeting directly with Tiso, whom Nansen characterized as "a fat thickset priest, in a floor length cassock, with a holy cross in gold dangling from a gold chain on his chest - and with a pair of staring dark eyes behind gold framed glasses." Impressed by Nansen's pedigree, Tiso assured him that the detention of Jews in concentration camp was merely a protective measure against "the agitated masses."

Nansen was unconvinced but traveled on to Vienna and back, all the while registering rampant riots, plundering and systematic persecution of Jews in the wake of Nazi supremacy. In transit through Bratislava, Nansen got exemption from the curfew and entered the Jewish quarter in the city where he witnessed firsthand that German, Austrian soldiers and paramilitary forces would nightly cross over from Austria and join with Hlinka Guard members to ransack and pillage the Jewish section of the city. Nansen tried in vain to register his alarm to Tiso and the chief of police, eventually giving up and returning to Prague where he hoped his efforts would bear more fruit.

While he was traveling, Filseth had returned to Norway to help refugees settle in there. Kari Nansen had joined efforts with, among others, the American and British Quaker organizations, to help Jewish refugees get across the border to Poland.

Operating under the conventional wisdom that Germany would invade Czechoslovakia on March 15, the Nansens joined forces with Red Cross and the high commissioner for refugees in Prague, Dr. Podajski in appealing to European governments to accept more refugees on an emergency basis and emergency relief funds to effect their departure. In cooperation with Vladislav Klumpbar, the Czech minister of social welfare and public health, the group worked through the night between March 14 and 15 to identify and secure the escape of the 8,000 - 9,000 refugees most in danger when and if the Nazis took over.

Having been told by Rudolf Kac, the leader of the Communist Refugee Group, that German forces had crossed the border, he managed to reach Klumpbar and Podajski in the early morning. Podajski told Nansen over the phone that the rumors were overblown, but Nansen actually saw German soldiers marching through the streets as the two were talking.

The Nansens had secured visas for about 80 refugees who were waiting outside the hotel that morning, awaiting their promised departure. Nansen made inquiries at several foreign missions in Prague before the Norwegian consul, Hribek, issued visas to all those whose passports were left with him. The Nansens were themselves evicted from the hotel to make room for Gestapo officials. They were able to find room in the Hotel Alcron, where they found one of their fellow guests was Erich Hoepner, a Germany army general. The Nansens sought out Hoepner and convinced him to allow exit for Jewish women and children, apparently behind the backs of the Gestapo. The Nansens helped the remaining male refugees across the border to Poland.

Tove Filseth returned to Prague shortly after this, and the organization resumed efforts to secure visas and both legal and illegal departures from Czech territories. Funds quickly ran out, though, as much of the travel had to be paid for with bribes. The refugee flow through Poland had become more organized, with the Norwegian ambassador Niels Christian Ditleff providing food, clothing, and transportation to Gdynia, where they could travel by sea to Norway.

On March 26, 1939, the Nansens traveled by train to Berlin and separated at Tempelhof airport, Odd Nansen flying to London to seek the assistance from Lord Herbert Emerson, the League of Nations high commissioner for refugees. Emerson had ignored all of Nansen's previous telegrams but was more receptive in person. He agreed to send an emissary to Warsaw to assess the situation. Nansen took his cause to the British parliament and the Soviet ambassador to St. James, Ivan Maisky, where he was rebuffed, though the ambassador expressed his profound appreciation for Nansen's father's efforts to alleviate the Ukrainian famine.

== Activities in Norway ==
Upon returning to Norway, Nansen approached Norwegian politicians to persuade his government to provide financial support for the refugees. Trygve Lie, the minister of justice at the time, agreed to support Nansen's request for financial support if he could persuade a majority of the Norwegian parliament to vote for the measure. Nansen persuaded every party in parliament to vote for such a grant, with the exception of the Agrarian party, which at least promised to abstain. This resulted in an infusion of NOK 500,000 to the cause, though Nansenhjelpen had to share it with the Labour Justice fund.

== Saving children ==
The organization's last project was to evacuate a number of Jewish children they had gathered in Bratislava, Prague, and Brno. After securing exit visas for them, they convened in Berlin, where they stayed at a synagogue and traveled together by train via Sweden to Norway. See Jewish Children's Home in Oslo.

== Conclusion ==
After Norway was invaded and occupied by Nazi Germany starting on April 9, 1940, there could be no more attempts to rescue Jews from the continent. Officials of the organization refocused their efforts on supporting the refugees already in Norway, well over 500. On January 13, 1942, Nansen was arrested by the Gestapo in Norway. He was kept in captivity at Møllergata 19, Grini concentration camp, and finally at Sachsenhausen, from where he returned in May 1945.
