= Kåre Kleivan =

Norwegian journalist (1917–1998)

Kåre Kleivan (13 June 1917 – 10 February 1998) was a Norwegian journalist.

He was from Tromsø, and started his journalistic career in Nordlys in 1937. During the German occupation of Norway he studied law at the University of Oslo and contributed to the illegal press before escaping to neutral Sweden, where he worked in the Norwegian legation in Stockholm. He is also known for escorting the Jewish family Smith from Northern Norway to Finland, away from German forces, in 1940. For this he was declared as a Righteous among the Nations in 2006.

He worked in Associated Press from 1945 to 1948, then in the newspaper Verdens Gang. From 1970 to 1984 he was a subeditor and leader of the political department in the newspaper. He chaired the local union Oslo Journalistklubb from 1972 to 1975 and was a national board member of the Norwegian Union of Journalists from 1962 to 1968. He was a member of the Workers' Youth League and the Norwegian Labour Party, and was also a member of the Norwegian Support Committee for Spain and chaired the Norway–Israel Association.

He settled in Kolbotn, was married to a Danish woman and had three children. He died in February 1998.
