= Alexia Bohwim =

Norwegian writer and activist (born 1969)

Alexia Bohwim or Alexia Knutsdatter Bohwim (born March 13, 1969, in Oslo) is a Norwegian writer, animal rights activist and feminist.

== Life ==
Bohwim made her debut in 2008 with the cult novel Frognerfitter. The book is about two girlfriends Billie and Susie, who live in Frogner, Oslo (where Bohwim grew up), and describes their lifestyle which includes a lot of drinking and sex, and addresses some of the myths that exist about people who live there. The book was published by Kagge Forlag and sold 40,000 copies.

Since then, Bohwim has written two books, MILF (2010) and Golddigger (2012), and has created a blog. This was later censored and banned. She has acquired the reputation of being outspoken and controversial. She has outspoken views about sex roles, life in Frogner and feminism.

For over four years, filmmaker Nina Grünfeld has followed Bohwim, and created a documentary about her life. The idea was to follow her for at least ten years, then to make a cinema documentary about living a different life. Over the years, she has been half-naked in several magazines, and describes herself as "a narcissist with empathy".

In 2018, a documentary series - also by Grünfeld - about her life called Alexia vs. Verden (Alexia vs. the world) ran on Norwegian TV3.

Bohwim has studied Norwegian movie history, movie history and is currently writing about the links between the deportation of the Norwegian jews and the cultural elite.

Frogner Babylon came September 2021 and is a sequel to Frognerfitter.

Bohwim is an animal rights activist and loves Fred Perry and tennis.

== Family ==
Bohwim's father is film director Knut Bohwim.

== Works ==
- Frognerfitter : roman Oslo : Kagge, 2008. ISBN 9788248907541
- MILF roman, Oslo Kagge 2010. ISBN 9788248909422
- Golddigger roman, Oslo Kagge 2012. ISBN 9788248912965
- Frogner Babylon, roman, Cappelen Damm 2021
