= Knut Bohwim =

Norwegian filmmaker (1931–2020)

- Born: 12 March 1931; Oslo, Norway
- Died: 16 June 2020 (aged 89)
- Occupation: Film director
- Known for: Directing twelve Olsen Gang films
- Notable work: Det største spillet (1967)
- Children: Alexia Bohwim
- Awards: Amanda Honorary Award (1997)

Knut Bohwim (12 March 1931 – 16 June 2020) was a leading Norwegian film director. He co-founded the company Teamfilm A/S in 1962. His debut as film director was Operasjon Sjøsprøyt from 1964. He directed the war drama Det største spillet from 1967, about the double agent Gunvald Tomstad. He directed twelve films of the Olsenbanden series, the largest commercial success in Norwegian film history. Bohwim was awarded the Amanda Honorary Award in 1997, shared with Aud Schønemann. He was awarded the Aamot Statuette in 2019, along with Arne Lindtner Næss.

Writer Alexia Bohwim is his daughter.
