= Nic Waal =

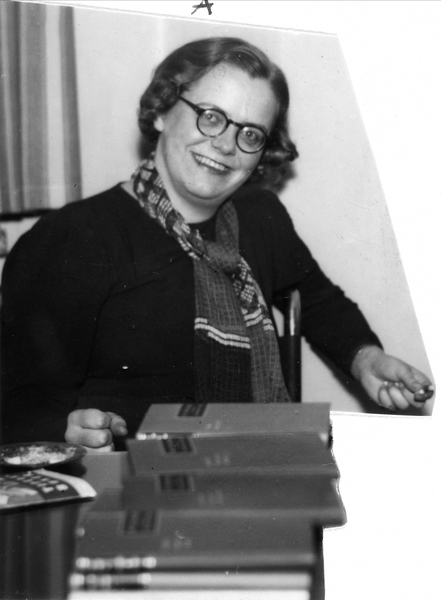
- Born: Caroline Schweigaard Nicolaysen; 1 January 1905; Kristiania
- Died: 28 May 1960 (aged 55)
- Other name: Nic Hoel
- Education: Cand.med.
- Alma mater: University of Oslo
- Occupation: Psychiatrist
- Years active: 1939-1960
- Employer: Nic Waal Institutt
- Known for: Pediatric and adolescent psychiatry, psychoanalysis, Righteous Among the Nations
- Spouse(s): Sigurd Hoel; Wessel Waal; Alex Helju
- Children: Helge Waal; Berit Waal
- Parent(s): Vilhelm Bernhoft Nicolaysen; Anna Horn

Nic Waal, born Caroline Schweigaard Nicolaysen in Kristiania, Norway (1 January 1905 – 28 May 1960) was a Norwegian psychiatrist, noted for her work among children and adolescents in Norway where she is known as "the mother of Norwegian pediatric and adolescent psychiatry". She was also active in the Norwegian resistance during World War II, and was named as one of the Righteous among the Nations by Yad Vashem.

== Biography ==
=== Early years ===
Caroline Schweigaard Nicolaysen (known in her childhood as Bitteba) was the youngest of four children born to Vilhelm Bernhoft Nicolaysen, an Army officer, and Anna Horn. She grew up in the section of Oslo known as Homansbyen, apparently an active and curious child, but also unusually sensitive. According to her son Helge Waal, she was prone to psychosomatic illnesses as a young child; and indeed she completed her first year of gymnasium at home, due to illness. She attended the Oslo Cathedral School starting in the fall of 1921, where her schoolmates included Trygve Bull, Karl Evang, and Trygve Braatøy.

She attended the University of Oslo, became politically active as a radical socialist, and finished her medical studies in 1930. She was associated with the Mot Dag movement and worked as an editor in the periodical Æsculap. The political convictions she developed as a student set the foundation for a lifelong engagement in social causes, especially related to the needs of children, adolescents, and women.

Plagued with her own emotional problems all her life, she first underwent psychoanalysis with Harald Schjelderup in Norway while she was a student. In 1927 she married the writer Sigurd Hoel. She continued her psychoanalysis in Berlin as a student under Salomea Kempner, and in 1933 and 1934 she was accepted in the German and Danish-Norwegian Psychoanalytic associations, respectively. In 1936, Sigurd Hoel and she divorced, and in 1937 she married Wessel Waal and took the last name Waal for good.

While in Berlin, Waal became associated with Wilhelm Reich and accompanied him when he fled Nazi persecution by moving to Norway. She continued her training first under another refugee from the Nazi regime, the Austrian Otto Fenichel, and then with Reich until 1939, when she opened her own psychoanalytic practice and joined the staff at Gaustad psychiatric hospital, where she remained on staff until 1947.

=== World War II and Norwegian resistance ===
During the German occupation from 1940 to 1945, Vaal was active in the Norwegian resistance. She was a key figure in the successful evacuation of children from the Jewish children from Oslo when it became known that they were about to be deportation to Auschwitz concentration camp. On 26 October 1942 a decree was issued for the arrest of all Jewish men in Oslo. Immediately thereafter, Nick and Nina Hasvold, the head mistress of the orphanage, began working on a rescue plan. On 25 November 1942, the head of the Nansen Committee Sigrid Lunn received a phone call from an unknown man, who warned them that "there would be another party, this time they would be collecting the smallest parcels". This meant the Nazi would start arresting children and women. Indeed, on 26 November 1942 a law was published, outlawing the residence of Jews in Norway. In the early morning of that day, 26 November 1942, Nick and Nina drove the 14 children of the orphanage, the oldest at the time 12 years old, to the villa of Waal's friend Gerde Tandberg in Ullern, a suburb of Oslo. Being a licensed doctor, Nick had a special driving permit and cards for gas. In the morning when they were getting ready, the children were told to put on two of each item of clothing, the eldest boy was instructed to hide 10,000 kronor in his boots - this money was to pay for a taxi to the Swedish border. They had to carry the boots in their hands - there was a woman who lived on the ground floor of their house who was sympathetic to the Nazis, and the children had to leave without attracting her attention. The children were carried on the floor of Nick's car - first the younger ones, then Waal went back for the older ones. On the second trip, the Germans blocked the crossing at Majorstua, but Vaal refused to stop the car and broke through the roadblock. The children were then taken one by one from the Tandberg house into homes of Vaal's relatives. For a week they stayed in hiding in the houses. During this week Sigrid Lunn helped a lot - she helped to look after the children and got ration cards so that they didn't have to starve. Seven days later all the children, hiding on the floor of a taxi, were taken to a hunting lodge near Elverum. The next morning Resistance members helped them walk three kilometres through the forest and to cross the border with Sweden. From the hut all the way to the border, the children followed each other's steps so that possible pursuers would not count their number by their footprints in the fresh snow. Until the end of the war, the children lived in a house on the outskirts of Gothenburg, funded by the Jewish community. One of the rescued children later recalled that the whole operation went very smoothly for them, as it was perfectly planned and the group was lucky. At the same time, all the children deported from Norway on the ship SS Donau (1929) ended up in the gas chambers of Auschwitz.

=== After war ===
Waal resumed her professional activities immediately after the war. She remained on the staff at Gaustad and also at Ullevål hospital, but also worked in Denmark, United States, Switzerland, and France, with Serge Lebovici. She was remembered by Cyrille Koupernik as "that Norwegian madwoman". In 1951, she was board certified as a psychiatrist, and in 1953, as one of the first in Norway, within paediatric and adolescent psychiatry.

Soon after her application to be the chief of staff at the newly formed Institute for Paediatric and Adolescent Psychiatry at Rikshospitalet was turned down (supposedly because her physical presentation was messy) in 1951, she started her own institute, named Nic Waals Institutt; first in her basement in the suburb Husebygrenda and eventually to the "blue house" in Munkedamsveien near Skillebekk.

Waal remained professionally active as the director of her institute until her death in 1960, also finding time to help juvenile offenders. She had two children with Wessel Waal, the psychiatrist Helge Waal (who also became her biographer) and the child psychologist Berit Waal Skaslien. She divorced Waal and married Alex Helju in 1951, who died in a boating accident in 1954.

== Professional contributions and legacy ==
In spite of her personal problems, Nic Waal maintained an active and passionate professional life, integrating advocacy on public health issues, a strong interest in teaching, and clinical discipline into a broad range of issues in her field. She made lasting contributions within the areas of:

- The practice of psychoanalysis and psychotherapy, usually within the context of Wilhelm Reich's framework but independently of his views. She did pioneering research and clinical work within the field of somatic psychiatric diagnostic techniques.
- Paediatric and adolescent psychiatry as a distinct field in Norwegian mental health
- Human sexuality, particularly among children and adolescents.
- Education - her institute provided educational programs for six distinct professions, including non-medical professionals such as psychologist, social workers, and clinical educators

When interviewed by the Norwegian radio shortly before her death, she said:

Many people think something with their heads and feel something different with their heart. Many close completely off their feelings when they think. This is often called being logical. But the heart also has its logic. It is said that women think with their hearts - as if this was something contemptible .... I am inclined to say that the restless and spontaneous heart behind opinions was and is the most important in opinions earlier, now, and in the future.

The Nic Waal Institute, though renamed for some time, now continues as a leading regional teaching and clinical institution in Oslo under the auspices of Lovisenberg Diakonale Sykhus.

== Literature ==
- Waal, Nic (1938). Filmen og barna (in Norwegian). Oslo: Tiden. - a book on the medium of film and its effect on children.
- Waal, Nic (1948). Vi og smårollingene våre i det første året (in Norwegian). Oslo: Tiden. - a book on parenting infants.
- Waal, Nic; Bjørn Christiansen; Bjørn Killingmo (1956). Personlighetsdiagnostikk med henblikk på strukturbeskrivelse : utkast til begrepssystem (in Norwegian). Oslo: Nic Waals Institutt. - "Personality diagnosis with the purpose of structural descriptions - a publication of her institute.
- Waal, Nic; Anne Grieg; Mogens Rasmussen (1957). Nic Waal's metode for somatisk psykodiagnostikk : beskrivelse av undersøkelsesmetoden med utkast til begrepssystem (in Norwegian). Oslo: Nic Waals Institutt. - an outline of Waal's somatic diagnostic methodology.
- Waal, Nic (1962). Er det foreldrenes skyld? (in Norwegian). Oslo: Cappelen. - published posthumously, but translated to several languages, on the role of parenting and sexual neuroses.
- Waal, Nic (1969). Anne-Marie Auestad, Borger Haavardsholm (ed.). Utvalgte faglige skrifter (in Norwegian). Oslo. - selected writings by Nic Waal.
- Waal, Helge (1991). Nic Waal : det urolige hjerte (in Norwegian). Oslo: Pax. ISBN 82-530-1530-5. - biography authored by her son, Helge Waal.
- Rottem, Øystein (1996). LystLesninger : åtte essays om kjønn og identitet i norsk litteratur (in Norwegian). Oslo: Cappelen akademisk forlag. ISBN 82-456-0034-2. - biographical essays of Henrik Ibsen, Knut Hamsun, Sigurd Hoel, Agnar Mykle, and others
- Waal, Nic; Einar Moe (2003). Nic Waals institutt : pioner og aktør i norsk barne- og ungdomspsykiatri gjennom 50 år. Oslo: Nic Waals Institutt. ISBN 82-991501-9-1. - anniversary publication for her institute.

== See also ==
- Ola Raknes
