= Salomea Kempner =

Polish psychoanalyst who practised in Switzerland

Salomea Kempner (1880–1940?) was a Polish psychoanalyst, assistant physician at the Cantonal Insane Asylum in Rheinau, Switzerland.

== Life ==
Salomea Kempner was from Płock, Poland. In 1921 she moved to Vienna, and in June 1922 was elected a member of the Vienna Psychoanalytic Society. In 1923 she moved to Berlin, where she worked at the Berlin Polyclinic, and became a member of the Berlin Psychoanalytic Society in January 1925. In 1935 she and Philipp Sarasin, with whom she had a longstanding relationship, visited Freud together. She became a training analyst in 1936. She supervised the training of Adelheid Koch. She continued conducting psychoanalytic control sessions in her apartment until 1937, but disappeared without trace in the Warsaw Ghetto.

== Works ==
- Versuche zum mikroskopischen Nachweis der Narkose der Nerven[Attempts at microscopic detection of nerve anesthesia]. Zürich, 1909.
- 'Beitrag zur Oralerotik'. Internationale Zeitschrift für Psychoanalyse, Vol. 11, p. 69-77, 1925
- 'Some remarks on oral erotism'. International Journal of Psycho-Analysis, Vol. 6, pp. 419–429, 1925
- (trans. with W. Zaniewicki) Wstęp do psychoanalizy by Sigmund Freud. Translation from the German Vorlesungen zur Einführung in die Psychoanalyse. Warsaw: J. Przeworski, 1935.
