= Sigrid Helliesen Lund =

Norwegian activist (1892–1987)

- Born: Sigrid Emilie Helliesen; 23 February 1892; Kristiania
- Died: 8 December 1987 (aged 95); Oslo
- Education: Music, vocalist
- Years active: 1927–1981
- Known for: Peace activist, prominent Quaker
- Spouse: Diderich H. Lund
- Children: 2, including Bernt H. Lund

Sigrid Helliesen Lund (23 February 1892 – 8 December 1987) was a Norwegian peace activist, noted for her humanitarian efforts throughout most of the 20th century, and in particular her resistance to the occupation of Norway during World War II. On 14 May 2006, Yad Vashem posthumously named her one of the Righteous Among the Nations for her work during the Holocaust.

== Biography ==
Sigrid grew up in a home hospitable to artists and intellectuals of her time, and she developed an independent spirit early in her life, refusing among other things to be confirmed in the Church of Norway. She earned her examen artium in 1911 and then took up studies in vocal music in Kristiania, Bayreuth, and Paris. She had her performance debut in 1918 in Oslo. However, she developed a respiratory ailment that made a singing career impossible.

She married Diderich Lund in 1923. They had two children; the younger, Erik, had Down syndrome. She started her humanitarian efforts in 1927 while she lived with her family in Odda Municipality. There she protested against what she perceived as unacceptable class differences. After she visited Germany in 1934, she joined the Women's International League for Peace and Freedom in 1935. She was also moved to start efforts on behalf of refugees. She became active with Nansenhjelpen and continued her efforts in occupied Norway during World War II. At the same time, she also started her efforts on behalf of children with special needs.

In the fall of 1939, she traveled to Prague to bring 37 Jewish children to Norway to save them from the Holocaust. She became active in the Jewish Children's Home in Oslo and played a central role in their rescue in 1942. Already a committed pacifist, she became involved with the Quakers during the war.

In February 1944, she had to flee Norway to Sweden, where she was made captain in charge of welfare services for Norwegians who had been repatriated from Nazi concentration camps. She continued this work after the war, extending her work to the merchant marine. She also held the first chair of Save the Children in Norway.

Sigrid Helliesen Lund formally joined the Quaker community in Oslo in 1947, and became a leading voice within the global Quaker community.

== See also ==
- Peter Morley, produced Women of Courage (1978) about Lund and three other women who defied the Nazis.
- Maria Rutkiewicz
- Hiltgunt Zassenhaus
- Mary Lindell
- List of peace activists
