= Unni Torkildsen =

Norwegian actress

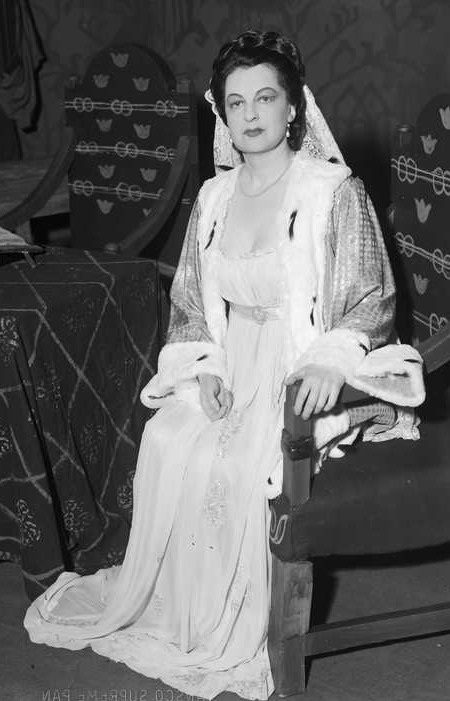
- Torkildsen in 1947
- Born: 14 August 1901; Kristiania, Norway
- Died: 20 June 1968 (aged 66)
- Occupation: Actress
- Spouse(s): Olafr Havrevold (divorced); Oscar Egede-Nissen

Unni Torkildsen (14 August 1901 – 20 June 1968) was a Norwegian actress.

== Biography ==
She was born in Kristiania (now Oslo), Norway. She was first married to actor Olafr Havrevold (1895–1972). Her second marriage was to the actor Oscar Egede-Nissen (1903–1976), the son of Adam Egede-Nissen and the brother of actresses Aud Egede-Nissen (1893–1974), Gerd Grieg (1895–1988), Ada Kramm (1899–1981) and Gøril Havrevold (1914–1992), who was also the ex-wife of Torkildsen's first hushand, Havrevold.

Torkildsen spent her entire career at the Nationaltheatret, until retirement in 1964. She made her stage debut at Nationaltheatret in 1925, as "Ophelia". She was later appointed at Nationaltheatret, where she played many leading roles over the years, with a total of 161 assigned tasks at the theatre.

== Filmography ==
- 1925: Fager er lien
- 1931: Den store barnedåpen as Georgine
- 1932: Prinsessen som ingen kunne målbinde as the princess
- 1937: To levende og en død as Helene Berger
- 1946: Så møtes vi imorgen as Gerda Berg
- 1954: Portrettet as Mrs. Hammer
- 1958: Ut av mørket
- 1959: Herren og hans tjenere
