= Havrevold =

Havrevold is a Norwegian surname. Notable people with the surname include:

- Finn Havrevold (1905–1988), Norwegian novelist
- Gøril Havrevold (1914–1992), Norwegian actress
- Odd Havrevold (1900–1991), Norwegian physician and psychiatrist
- Olafr Havrevold (1895–1972), Norwegian engineer and actor
