= Georg Richter =

German-Norwegian actor (1915–1972)

- Born: Georg Lüddeckens Alexander Richter; 27 December 1915; Berlin, German Empire
- Died: 10 May 1972 (aged 56); Oslo, Norway
- Occupation: Actor
- Spouse(s): Ingeborg Steffens; Bertha Smedsgaard; Vibeke Falk
- Parents: Georg Alexander (father); Aud Egede-Nissen (mother)
- Relatives: Adam Egede-Nissen (grandfather); Georga Wilhelma Ellertsen (grandmother); Gerd Grieg (aunt); Ada Kramm (aunt); Gøril Havrevold (aunt); William Steffens (father-in-law); Thorolf Beyer Mowinckel (father-in-law)

Georg Lüddeckens Alexander Richter (27 December 1915 – 10 May 1972) was a German-born Norwegian actor.

== Personal life ==
Richter was born in Berlin to German actor Georg Alexander and Norwegian actress Aud Egede-Nissen. His stepfather was the Austrian actor Paul Richter.

He was a grandson of politician Adam Egede-Nissen and Goggi Egede-Nissen. His aunts included actresses Gerd Grieg, Ada Kramm, Gøril Havrevold, and Lill Egede-Nissen, and his uncles included actors Oscar Egede-Nissen and Stig Egede-Nissen.

His first marriage was with actress Ingeborg Steffens, daughter of military officer William Steffens. His second marriage was to actress Bertha Smedsgaard. His third marriage was to actress Vibeke Falk, daughter of businessman Thorolf Beyer Mowinckel.

== Career ==
Following examen artium in 1935, Richter studied two years at the Carnegie Mellon School of Drama in Pittsburgh, United States. He made his stage debut at Søilen Teater in 1938. In 1938 he was appointed at Det Norske Teatret, where he played in adaptations of Kaj Munk's play I Brændingen and Maxwell Anderson's play High Tor. He further worked for Det nye Teater from 1940 to 1943 and from 1945 to 1950, primarily in comedies. From 1952 to 1956 he was assigned with Riksteatret, where his roles included "Mack the Knife" in The Threepenny Opera and "Nils Lykke" in Ibsen's play Lady Inger of Ostrat. He worked for Centralteatret from 1943 to 1945, and had assignments for both Folketeatret and Trøndelag Teater between 1957 and 1959. From 1960 to 1968 he was assigned with Den Nationale Scene in Bergen, and thereafter with Oslo Nye Teater.

He made his film debut in 1939, in Leif Sinding's film De vergeløse based on a book by Gabriel Scott, as the principal character "Albert". He also played leading roles in Så møtes vi imorgen (1946) and Himmel og helvete (1969), and minor roles in Et spøkelse forelsker seg, Tante Pose, I slik en natt, Lake of the Dead, and Olsenbanden.

Richter died in Oslo on 10 May 1972.
