= Christian Reim =

Norwegian jazz musician (1945–2025)

- Born: 30 September 1945; Porsgrunn, Norway
- Died: 14 April 2025 (aged 79)
- Occupation: Jazz musician

Christian Reim (30 September 1945 – 14 April 2025) was a Norwegian jazz musician, a pianist and organist, composer and orchestral leader.

== Life and career ==
Born in Porsgrunn on 30 September 1945, Reim settled in Oslo from 1965. He played with the Ditlef Eckhoff quintet from 1965 to 1966. He played in the rhythm and blues group Public Enemies from 1966 to 1967. He played with the psychedelic progressive rock group Dream from 1967 to 1969, along with Terje Rypdal, Hans Marius Stormoen and Tom Karlsen. The group played mostly at Club 7 in Oslo, and issued Norway’s first psychedelic album in 1967. He later mainly played in his own small musical groups, and also composed music for film, television and theatre. He chaired the Oslo jazz club Hot House from 1979 to 1985, and later the club Jazz Alive.

Reim died on 14 April 2025, at the age of 79.
