= Meyer Foshaug =

Norwegian politician (1868–1955)

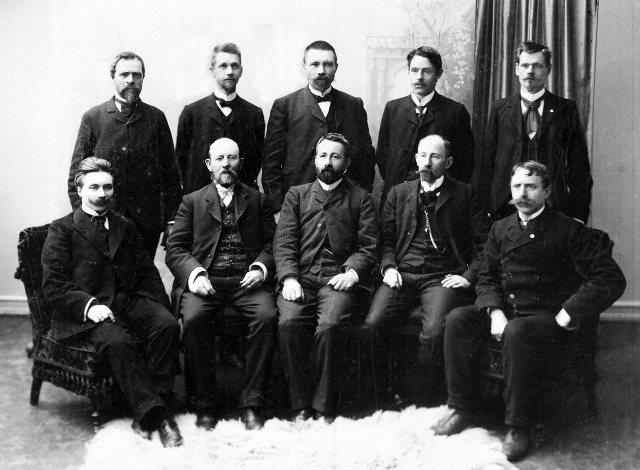
Labour parliamentary group 1906; Johansen second right in the upper row.

Meyer Nilssen Foshaug (15 June 1868 – 6 June 1955) was a Norwegian farmer and politician for the Labour and Social Democratic Labour parties. He served ten terms in the Parliament of Norway.

== Career ==
He was born at Foshaug in Målselv Municipality as a son of farmers Nils Johnsen Foshaug and Erikka Korneliusdatter. He worked on the family farm from an early age. He was a member of the Målselv municipal council from 1901 to 1904, and was elected to the Parliament of Norway already in the 1903 election, representing the constituency of Tromsø Amt. The Labour Party got its first four parliamentary seats after the 1903 election, all representatives of Northern Norway. In addition to Foshaug, they were Jørg Berge, Alfred Eriksen and John Lind Johansen; also, Adam Egede-Nissen was elected on the Liberal Party ballot. After Norway adopted single-member constituencies, Foshaug was re-elected from the constituency Senjen in 1906, 1909, 1912, 1915 and from Malangen in the 1918 election.

Norway reverted to multi-member constituencies, and Foshaug was elected from the constituency Troms. In 1921, when the Labour Party split in two because of disagreements over the Comintern membership, Foshaug disavowed the pro-Comintern faction and joined the new Social Democratic Labour Party of Norway. He was elected on their ballot in the 1921 parliamentary election. He was also elected as a national board member of the party. However, by the next election in 1924 the Social Democratic Labour Party had lost out in the political competition and he was not re-elected. His fifth seat was taken by the Liberal Party. Foshaug instead served as mayor of Målselv from 1925 to 1931. In 1927 the Labour and Social Democratic Labour parties reunited under the former name, and Foshaug was elected to Parliament in 1927, 1933 and 1936. During the intermittent term 1931–1933 he was a deputy representative.

He was a board member of Troms Fylkes Dampskibsselskap from 1926 to 1941 and of the Norwegian Water Resources and Energy Directorate from 1935. During the German occupation of Norway, specifically from 1942, he lost his political positions. After the occupation, in 1945, he briefly served as deputy mayor of Målselv. He did not return to national politics after the Parliament of 1936 had fulfilled its term. He died in 1955.

He was a Baptist.
