= Alfred Eriksen =

Norwegian politician (1864–1934)

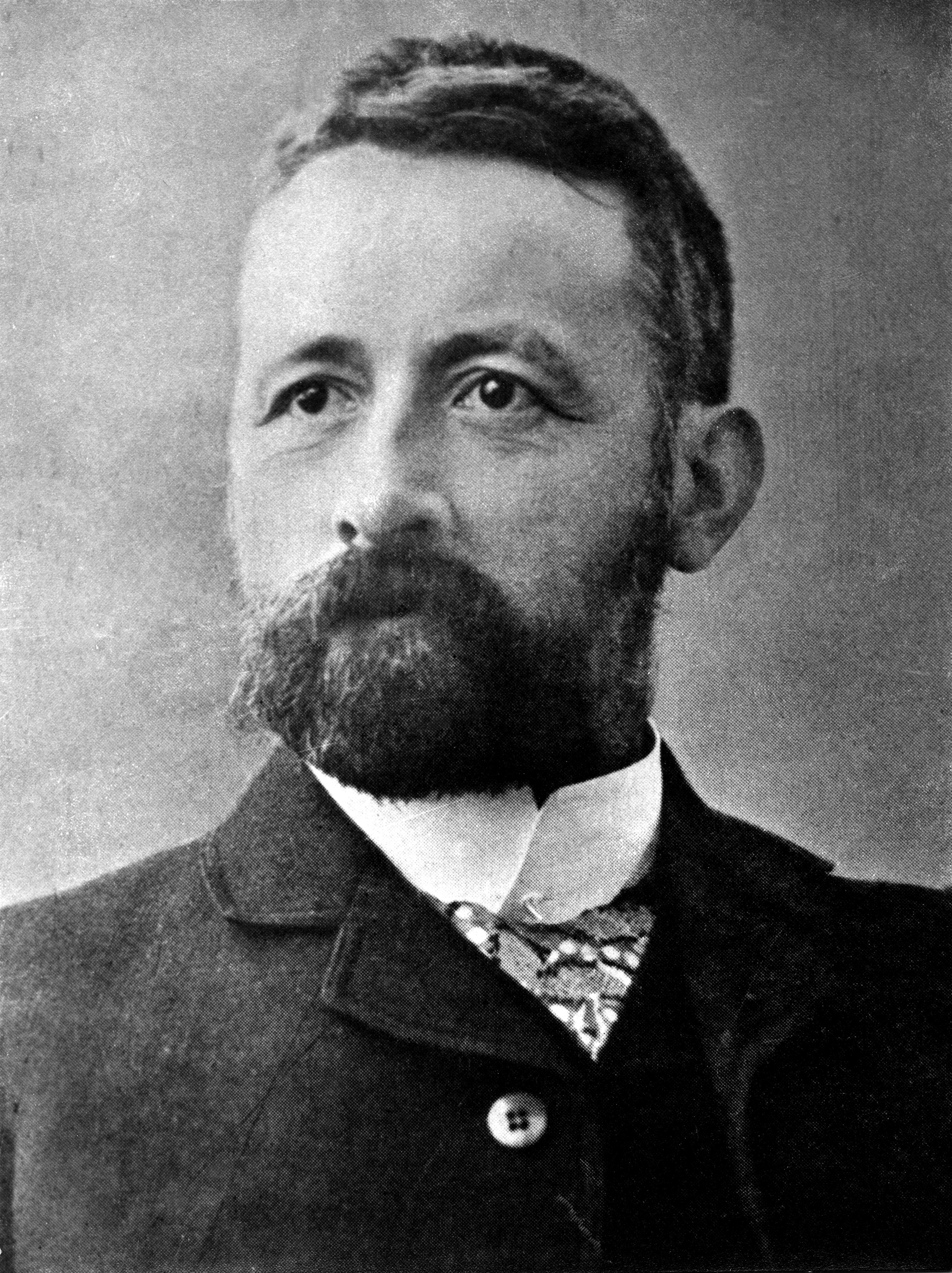
- Born: 30 August 1864; Christiania, Norway
- Died: 4 May 1934 (aged 69); Oslo
- Occupations: Priest, politician, newspaper editor and non-fiction writer
- Children: Solvejg Eriksen

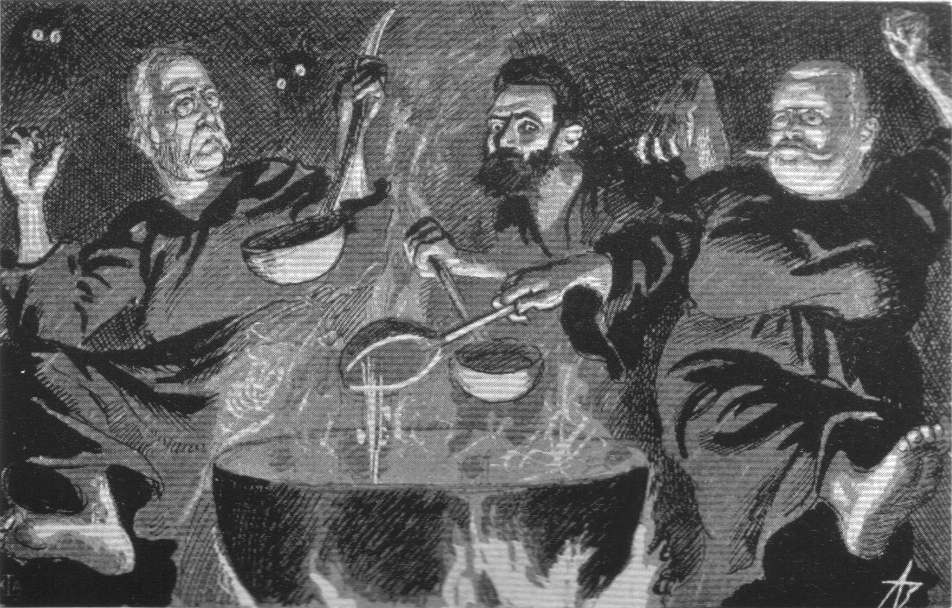
Caricature from 1905 in Korsaren by Andreas Bloch. Eriksen in the middle.

Alfred Eriksen (nicknamed "Karlsøypresten", 30 August 1864 – 4 May 1934) was a Norwegian priest, politician, newspaper editor, and non-fiction writer.

== Personal life ==
He was born as Alfred Eriksen in Christiania as the son of the watchmaker Henrik Erichsen (1825–1870) and Emilie Kathrine Christoffersen (1825–1902). He married the vicar's daughter Sigrid Marie Wexelsen (1866–1960) in August 1890. He was the brother of the painter and film director Adam Eriksen, and the father of the journalist and author Solvejg Eriksen.

== Career ==
Eriksen finished his secondary education at Kristiania Cathedral School in 1883. He then studied theology, graduating with the cand.theol. degree in theology in 1888. After working one year as a teacher in Ålesund he was appointed vicar for the parish of Karlsøy in 1891, and held this position until 1910, when he became vicar in Vålerengen Church. While being a priest he wrote his doctoral thesis, titled Vilje. En psykologisk afhandling. He was founder and first editor of the newspaper Nordlys from 1902, and edited Nordlys until 1911. In 1913 he founded the publication Dagens Liv, and edited it, but it soon became defunct. He published a popular book on the history of religion, Religionsbilleder og kulturskildringer, in 1901, and a book on jurisprudence for ordinary people, Lovbok for folket, in 1903.

He also became involved in politics, was elected mayor of Karlsøy Municipality for the Liberal Party in 1898, and re-elected in 1901 and 1904. He was a failed candidate for the 1900 general election; although his party swept the vote in Karlsøy, this was not enough to win the constituency of Tromsø Amt. In 1903 he was elected to the Parliament of Norway, representing the Norwegian Labour Party. This was the first time members of the organized labour movement were represented in Parliament. The Labour Party went from 0 to 4 seats after the 1903 election, all representatives of Northern Norway. In addition to Lind Johansen, they were Meyer Foshaug, John Lind Johansen and Jørg Berge; also, Adam Egede-Nissen was elected on the Liberal Party ballot. He was re-elected to Parliament in 1906 and in 1909 for the constituency of Tromsøsundet. He became known as one of the greatest speakers at the Parliament during this period, and his nickname "Karlsøypresten" became a well-known concept among the general public.

He was awarded the Medal for Outstanding Civic Service for his role as mediator in the 1911 lockout. Eriksen did not want to subordinate himself to the party discipline, and was eventually expelled from the Labour Party in 1912. Contributing to his downfall was his actions in the position as chairman of the society Riksmålsforbundet from 1911 to 1912. From then he was not politically active, but wrote numerous newspaper articles on cultural topics.

Eriksen died in Oslo on 4 May 1934, at the age of 69.

== Selected works ==
- Vilje. En psykologisk afhandling. 1896. (thesis)
- Religionsbilleder og kulturskildringer. 1901.
- Lovbog for folket. 1903.
- Slettensaken. 1906.
