= Hurra for Andersens! =

Hurra for Andersens
- Directed by: Knut Andersen
- Screenplay by: Sigbjørn Hølmebakk
- Based on: Sigbjørn Hølmebakk's novel Hurra for Andersens
- Produced by: Olof Thiel
- Starring: Arve Opsahl; Aud Schønemann; Rolv Wesenlund; Elsa Lystad
- Cinematography: Mattis Mathiesen
- Edited by: Knut Andersen
- Music by: Egil Monn-Iversen
- Production company: Teamfilm AS
- Distributed by: Nordisk Film Distribusjon AS
- Release date: September 1, 1966
- Running time: 108 minutes
- Country: Norway

Hurra for Andersens! (Hurrah for the Andersens!) is a 1966 Norwegian romantic comedy film directed by Knut Andersen. It stars Arve Opsahl, Aud Schønemann, Rolv Wesenlund, and Elsa Lystad. The film is based on Sigbjørn Hølmebakk's novel of the same name.

== Plot ==
Father and mother Andersen and their four children live in a closed country store on the outskirts of Oslo. They are thriving there, but many of the neighbors that live in the modern townhouse are outraged by the Andersen family and their lack of respect for the community's rules of order. The district committee chairman Alf Hermansen (Rolv Wesenlund) and neighbor Salvesen (Elsa Lystad) have had many pleasant times together over the years around the shared indignation they feel for the Andersen family. Matters do not improve when the Andersens win a large amount in betting and people find out that they are getting married. They therefore invite all the neighbors to the wedding party, but complications arise when they schedule it on the same date as the district committee's five-year anniversary. People in the housing association therefore start to form camps. The housing association's leader hires professional musicians in an attempt to sabotage the Andersens' event. Despite the strife, everything ends with a large wedding and peace and reconciliation.

== Reception ==
The film was well received by reviewers. The newspapers Dagbladet, Aftenposten, and Verdens Gang gave it four stars out of six, and Dagsavisen gave it three.

NRK wrote in connection with a broadcast of the film in 2003 that "Arve Opsahl and Aud Schønemann score high as a couple team in this film, with a screenplay by Sigbjørn Hølmebakk. So do Rolv Wesenlund and Elsa Lystad as the neighborhood's prestige seekers." The paper further wrote: "Hurra for Andersens! is definitely related to predecessors such as Støv på hjernen and Sønner av Norge."

== Music ==
The film contains a live musical performance by the Norwegian blues group Public Enemies. Wenche Sandnæs performs the song "Hurra for Andersens," composed by Egil Monn-Iversen and with lyrics by Alfred Næss. It was released on the single Nor-Disc NOR 146. The song was also released on the compilation album Norske filmklassikere (Norwegian Film Classics) by PolyGram in 1993.

Arve Opsahl performs the song "Carl Alfred Andersens vuggevise" (Carl Alfred Andersen's Lullaby), composed by Egil Monn-Iversen and with lyrics by Alfred Næss. The song was also released on the single Nor-Disc NOR 146.

== Cast ==
- Arve Opsahl as Carl Alfred Andersen
- Aud Schønemann as Hildur Evensen, Andersen's fiancée
- Wenche Sandnæs as Tone Andersen, 17 years old
- Kristine Reymert as Sylvi Andersen, 10 years old
- Peter Reymert as Roger Andersen, 7 years old
- Agnete Reymert as Vesla Andersen, 3 years old
- Rolv Wesenlund as Hermansen
- Elsa Lystad as Mrs. Salvesen
- Gard Øyen as Erik Hermansen
- Randi Kolstad as Mrs. Hermansen
- Kaare Zachariassen
- Carsten Byhring as Andersen's colleague
- Kari Diesen as the seamstress
- Tore Foss as the mayor
- Bernt Erik Larssen as the headmaster
- Rolf Sand as the board member
- Hans Stormoen as the priest
- Ottar Wicklund as the lighting engineer
- Hans Marius Stormoen as a musician (in Public Enemies)
