= Jørg Berge =

Norwegian politician (1854–1916)

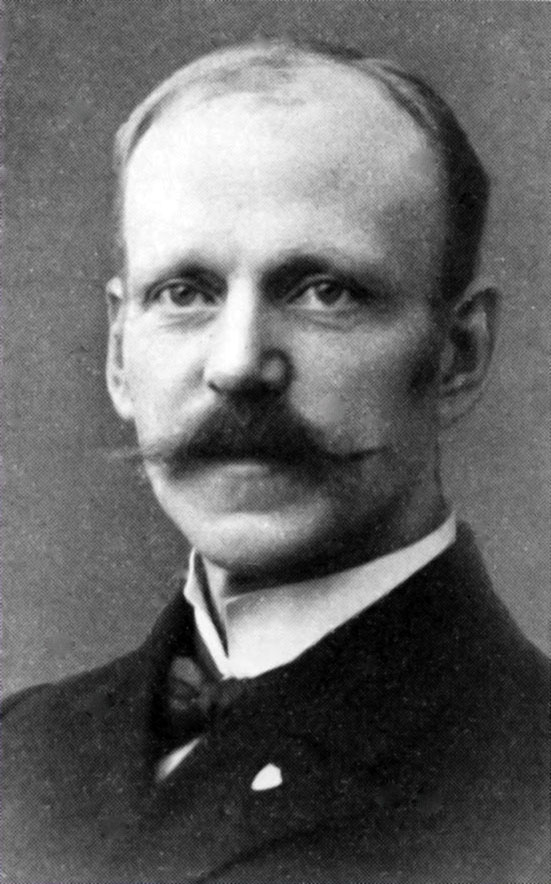
Jørg Berge

Jørg (Jørgen) Berge (3 September 1854 – 1916) was a Norwegian editor, temperance activist and politician for the Labour Party.

He was born in Arendal. He spent several years as a seaman, and studied and worked in Canada, Spain and several cities in France. He converted to Roman Catholicism while hospitalized in Montreal. Back in Norway he worked as a teacher at Catholic schools in Kristiania and Alten, and also a catechist in Harstad. He was briefly subeditor of the newspaper Finmarken in Vadsø, and from 1907 lighthouse keeper in Vikten. However, he is best remembered for his time in Narvik, where he moved with his family around 1900.

While living in Narvik he edited the Labour newspaper Fremover and was elected to the Parliament of Norway as early as in the 1903 election, representing the urban constituency of Tromsø, Bodø og Narvik. The Labour Party went from 0 to 4 seats after the 1903 election, all representatives of Northern Norway. In addition to Berge, they were Meyer Foshaug, Alfred Eriksen and John Lind Johansen; also, the socialist Adam Egede-Nissen won election on the Liberal Party ballot. Berge served only one term, as Narvik was deprived of having a candidate in Tromsø, Bodø og Narvik. He stood for re-election in Nord-Trøndelag in 1912 and 1915, but without succeeding.
