= En glad gutt =

1932 film

- Directed by: John W. Brunius
- Written by: Bjørnstjerne Bjørnson (short story)
- Produced by: Aud Egede-Nissen
- Starring: Tore Foss; Hauk Aabel; Gøril Havrevold
- Cinematography: Gunnar Nilsen-Vig
- Release date: 24 October 1932
- Running time: 96 minutes
- Country: Norway
- Language: Norwegian

En glad gutt (English: A Happy Boy) is a 1932 Norwegian drama film directed by John W. Brunius, starring Tore Foss, Hauk Aabel and Gøril Havrevold. The film is based on the story En glad Gut by Bjørnstjerne Bjørnson, published in 1860.

== Cast ==
- Tore Foss as Øyvind husmansgutt
- Gøril Havrevold as Marit
- Hauk Aabel as Ola Nordistua
- Eugen Skjønberg as Øyvind's father
- Harald Stormoen as Bård skolemester
- Ragnhild Hald as Øyvind's mother
- Andreas Bjarke as Jon Hatlen
- Hjørdis Bjarke as En bondejente
- Johannes Jensen as Presten
