= John Lind Johansen =

Norwegian politician

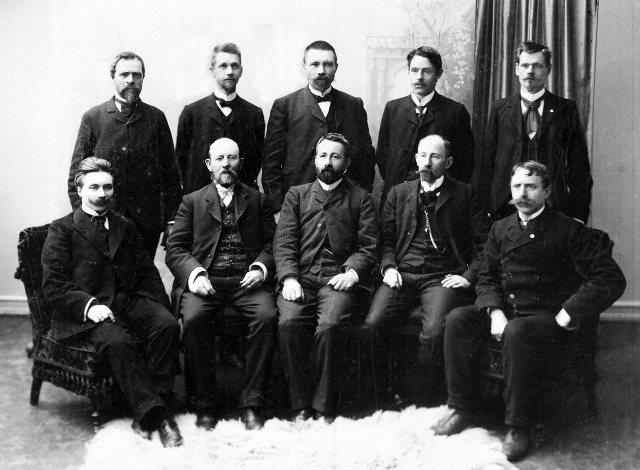
Labour parliamentary group 1906; Johansen left in the upper row.

John Lind Johansen (29 September 1852 – 31 January 1940) was a Norwegian politician for the Labour Party.

He was born at Aarstein in Ibbestad. He studies fisheries in France and Belgium, and spent his working career as a fisher and farmer. He was a member of Ibbestad municipal council, and served as deputy mayor, for some time. He was elected to the Parliament of Norway already in the 1903 election, representing the constituencies of Tromsø Amt. The Labour Party went from 0 to 4 seats after the 1903 election, all representatives of Northern Norway. In addition to Lind Johansen, they were Meyer Foshaug, Alfred Eriksen and Jørg Berge; also, Adam Egede-Nissen was elected on the Liberal Party ballot. Johansen was re-elected from the new single-member constituency for Trondenes Municipality in 1906 to serve one more term.
