= John Johansen =

John Johansen may refer to:

- John Johansen (athlete) (1883–1947), Norwegian sprinter
- John Anker Johansen (1894–1986), Norwegian gymnast
- John Christen Johansen (1876–1964), Danish-American portraitist
- John M. Johansen (1916–2012), American architect
- John Lind Johansen (1852–?), Norwegian politician for the Labour Party
