= Ugler i mosen =

- Directed by: Ivo Caprino
- Written by: Ivo Caprino
- Produced by: Per G. Jonson
- Starring: Grethe Nilsen
- Release date: 26 December 1959
- Running time: 94 minutes
- Country: Norway
- Language: Norwegian

Ugler i mosen is a 1959 Norwegian mystery and adventure family film directed by Ivo Caprino. The title, which literally means 'Owls in the Moss', is based on the idiom det er ugler i mosen 'I smell a rat; there is mischief afoot'.

The film was written by Caprino as an adaptation of Finn Havrevold's children's book Marens lille ugle (Maren's Little Owl). The leading role was played by 12-year-old Grethe Nilsen, and the film also featured Sverre Hansen, Turid Balke, Kjetil Bang-Hansen, Egil Hjorth-Jenssen and Aud Schønemann.

Animation figures also played central roles in the film.

== Plot ==
The Monsen family has inherited uncle Pavel's house in southern Norway. When listening to an old phonograph, the children hear uncle Pavel tell about a hidden fortune, but to find it they have to solve four mysteries.

== Cast ==
- Grethe Nilsen as Maren
- Kari Borg as Trine
- Turid Balke as Mrs. Monsen
- Sverre Hansen as Monsen
- Kjetil Bang-Hansen
- Egil Hjorth-Jenssen
- Ingolf Rogde
- Willie Hoel
- Aud Schønemann
- Amund Rydland
