= Sverre Hansen (actor) =

Norwegian actor

Sverre Hansen (24 August 1919 – 21 October 1995) was a Norwegian actor. He was born in Bergen. He made his stage debut at Studioteatret in 1945, and was later assigned at Det Nye Teater, Folketeatret, Nationaltheatret and Fjernsynsteatret. Among his films are minor roles in Ni liv from 1957, and Ugler i mosen from 1959, and his leading role in the film Eggs from 1995 earned him the Amanda Award.

== Filmography ==
Year	Title	Role	Notes
1950	To mistenkelige personer		
1953	Skøytekongen		
1957	Nine Lives	Skomakeren	
1959	The Master and His Servants	Statsadvokaten	
1959	Støv på hjernen		
1959	Ugler i mosen	Monsen, bokholder	
1961	Hans Nielsen Hauge	Handelsmann i Bergen	
1962	Stompa & Co	Stakan	
1966	Hunger	Painter	
1960	Hennes meget kongelige høyhet	Krantzman	
1970	Operasjon V for vanvidd	Fennmann	
1970	One Day in the Life of Ivan Denisovich		
1970	Ballad of the Masterthief Ole Hoiland	Peder Olsen Høiland	
1975	Min Marion	Forstander	
1978	Formynderne	Overlegen	
1980	Belønningen	Dommer	
1980	At dere tør!	Dommeren	
1987	På stigende kurs	Skipsreder	
1989	Viva Villaveien!	Sigurd Vatne / Torben Hansen	
1993	Kalle och änglarna	Erkeengel #1	
1995	Eggs	Moe	
1995	Kristin Lavransdatter	Håkon	
1996	Gåten Knut Hamsun	Medredaktør	
