= Ingolf Rogde =

Norwegian actor (1911–1978)

- Born: 14 May 1911
- Died: 4 June 1978; Oslo
- Resting place: Vestre gravlund
- Occupation: Actor
- Spouse: Siri Rom
- Awards: Knight First Class of the Order of St. Olav (1969)

Ingolf Rogde (14 May 1911 – 4 June 1978) was a Norwegian actor. He was born in Sande Municipality in Sunnmøre, and was married to actress Siri Rom. He was mainly known for his long-term period with the touring theatre Riksteatret. Rogde made his stage debut at Trøndelag Teater in 1937, and was later assigned with Det Nye Teater, Det Norske Teatret, Riksteatret and Rogaland Teater. He also worked for Radioteatret. Among his films are Rikard Nordraak (1945) and Ugler i mosen (1959). He was decorated Knight, First Class of the Order of St. Olav in 1969.
