= Goggi Egede-Nissen =

Norwegian politician (1871–1959)

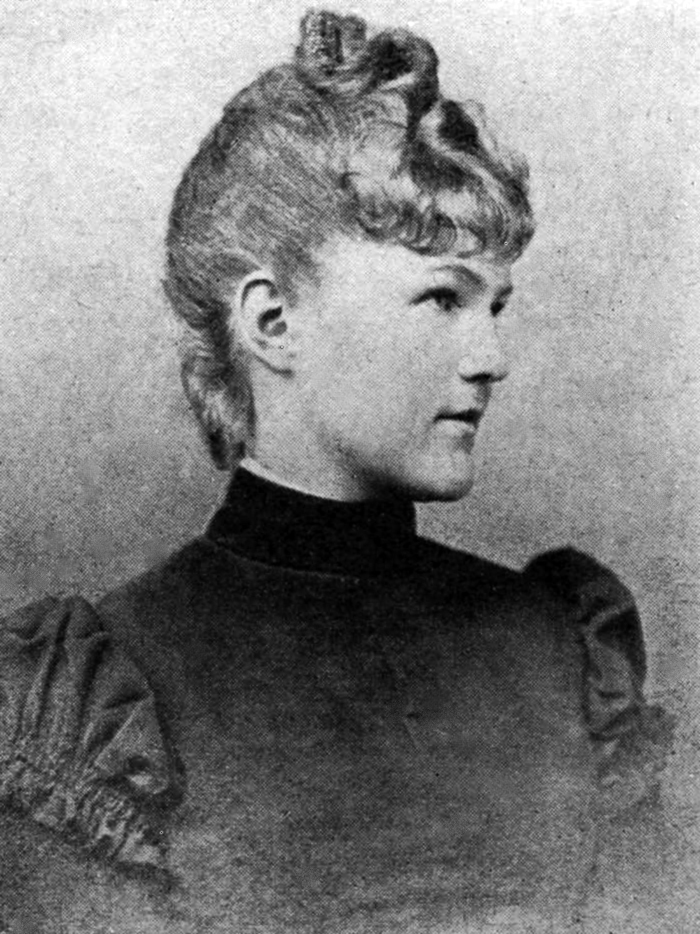
- Born: Georga Wilhelma Ellertsen; January 20, 1871; Bergen, Norway
- Died: August 15, 1959 (aged 88); Bærum, Norway
- Resting place: Vestre gravlund, Oslo
- Occupation: Politician
- Spouse: Adam Egede-Nissen (m. 1892; died 1953)
- Children: 11, including: Oscar Egede-Nissen; Ada Kramm; Aud Egede-Nissen; Gøril Havrevold; Gerd Grieg; Lill Egede-Nissen; Stig Egede-Nissen
- Relatives: Georg Richter (grandson)

Georga Wilhelma "Goggi" Egede-Nissen (née Ellertsen; January 20, 1871 – August 15, 1959) was the wife and comrade-in-arms of Adam Egede-Nissen, a Norwegian Labor Party politician and the chairman of the Communist Party of Norway, for six decades. She was the mother of several prominent Norwegian actors.

Georga Ellertsen was the daughter of the shipbroker Fredrik Johan Ellertsen (1821–1907) and Marianne Schnelle (1827–1910). Although she came from a well-to-do family, she became aware of the economic realities of life early on. The family was hit by ship losses and surety obligations that depleted its fortune and forced it to sell its summer resort, Solbakken.

In her youth, Ellertsen showed talent for singing and acting, and she played the violin in Germany. However, she gave up her own artistic career plans when she married Adam Egede-Nissen in 1892. During their long marriage, she was responsible for the house, home, and eventually eleven children. She also took an active part in political life, and she played an important role for Adam Egede-Nissen when he took his seat in the Storting in 1900. He says in his memoirs that "Goggi became my constant coworker" (Goggi ble min stadige medarbeider), and in the home it became a routine for the husband to always first read his speeches, articles, and correspondence for his wife.

When the family moved to Vardø in 1897, she performed at meetings where her husband spoke. There she received a lot of attention for her violin playing. As a stay-at-home mother with the children, she was also not spared during the political environment of the time: in Vardø, among other things, she experienced having a window in her home smashed in while her husband was at a victory meeting at the Polar Star (Polarstjernen) lodge after a vote on liquor sales in the city. When the news of the incident reached the lodge, the meeting participants walked in a united troop home to Goggi. Later, the family settled in Stavanger, where Adam Egede-Nissen became a famous (and infamous) postmaster in 1911 and served as mayor from 1916 to 1919.

After the Labor Party split in 1923, Goggi Egede-Nissen became a member of the Norwegian Communist Party. In 1932 she also accompanied her husband on an extensive trip in the Soviet Union under Stalin.

The family left Stavanger in 1933, and they later settled in Bærum.

The couple's eleven children were raised following both their father's and mother's cultural interests. Seven of the children then also became well-known actors and actresses: Aud Egede-Nissen, Gerd Grieg, Ada Kramm, Oscar Egede-Nissen, Stig Egede-Nissen, Lill Egede-Nissen, and Gøril Havrevold.
