= Snowshoe Bandits =

1928 film

- Directed by: Uwe Jens Krafft
- Written by: Jonathan Jerv (novel), Alf Rød (screenplay)
- Starring: Aud Egede-Nissen; Paul Richter
- Cinematography: Johann Bentzen; Paul Berge; Günther Krampf
- Music by: Werner Schmidt-Boelcke
- Production companies: Helios Film; Norsk Super Film
- Distributed by: Terra Film
- Release date: 8 October 1928
- Running time: 98 minutes
- Countries: Germany; Norway
- Languages: Silent; German intertitles

Snowshoe Bandits (German: Schneeschuhbanditen) is a 1928 German-Norwegian silent comedy film directed by Uwe Jens Krafft and starring Aud Egede-Nissen and Paul Richter. The film's sets were designed by the art director Jacek Rotmil. Location shooting took place in Norway.

== Cast ==
- Aud Egede-Nissen as Grete Elstad
- Paul Richter as Tom Heiberg, student
- Uwe Jens Krafft as Nils Elstad, generaldir.
- Ada Kramm as Eva Krohn
- Fridtjof Mjøen as Lund, løytnant
- Frederik Schumann as Biologen, student
- Lauritz Johnson as Johan Bratt
- Jon E. Johnson as Tiurjegeren, student
- Olav Engebretsen as Bokseren
- Henry Bender
- Julietta Brandt
- Gustav Ferslew
- Karl Harbacher
- Rudolf Lettinger
- Ida Perry
- Ilse Stobrawa
- Hedwig Wangel
- Aruth Wartan

== Bibliography ==
- Goble, Alan (1999). The Complete Index to Literary Sources in Film. Berlin: Walter de Gruyter. ISBN 978-3-11-095194-3.
