= Kathrine Bugge =

Norwegian educator, cultural worker and politician

Kathrine Susanne Bugge, née Hanssen (30 May 1877 – 10 June 1951) was a Norwegian educator, cultural worker and politician for the Communist Party.

She was born in Bodø as a daughter of tailor, editor and missionary Jakob Andreas Hanssen and his wife Mathilde Dahl. She attended middle school, and at age 16 she worked as a governess. She then attended Tromsæ Teachers' Seminary and graduated there in 1897. She was hired as a middle school teacher in Vardø in 1899. Here she met Thorolf Bugge (1879–1935), whom she married in December 1902. The two became a part of the radical and revolutionary milieu in the city, located close to the Russian border.

Kathrine fell ill in 1906, and the couple moved to a small farm in Jarfjord in Sør-Varanger Municipality. Her husband worked at the farm and in the company Sydvaranger. Kathrine was an active cultural worker in the district, with literature, oratory and dance, as well as a Socialist Sunday school. In the socialist enlightenment work in Finnmark, the Bugge couple stood out together with Ellisif Wessel. Articles written by Kathrine Bugge was spread mainly through Ellisif Wessel's books Den lille kammerat, Den lille socialist and Klasse mot klasse, all released in 1914, as well as newspapers, especially Finmarken and Folkets Frihet.

In 1916 they moved to Kirkenes, and then to Oslo after Thorolf won the 1921 Norwegian parliamentary election. They moved back after Thorolf lost the 1924 Norwegian parliamentary election. In the meantime both had left the Labour Party and joined the Communist Party in 1923, where Kathrine notably was the deputy leader of the party's secretariat for women's affairs. Kathrine moved back to Jarfjord in 1935. She died in June 1951 in Sør-Varanger from cancer.
