= Marens lille ugle =

Norwegian children's book from 1957

- Author: Finn Havrevold
- Language: Norwegian
- Published: 1957
- Publication place: Norway

Marens lille ugle (English: Maren's Little Owl) is a Norwegian children's book from 1957, written by Finn Havrevold. The story is about the young girl Maren and her rag owl, which needs comfort when Maren is anxious. The book was adapted for radio, and it was basis for the film Ugler i mosen from 1959, directed by Ivo Caprino.
