= Thorolf Bugge =

Norwegian trade unionist and politician (1879–1935)

Thorolf Bugge (1 October 1879 – 21 May 1935) was a Norwegian trade unionist and politician for the Labour and Communist parties.

He was born in Heddal as a son of district physician Johan Carl Bugge (1847–1902) and Christine Theodora Drolsum (1854–1882). He was a grandson of Ulrik Bugge. He had middle school education, and also studied at Bergen Technical School. He was hired at a post office in Vardø in 1898, and when postmaster Adam Egede-Nissen was a member of Parliament, Bugge was acting postmaster in Vardø from 1901 to 1906. He then started working at a farm and in the company Sydvaranger. He became chairman of the trade union Nordens Klippe from 1907 to 1908, but for his activism he was blacklisted. He continued as a farmer until 1916, then as a manager in Sør-Varanger Municipality provisioning council until 1917, then as a municipal secretary. He moved from his farm to Kirkenes.

He had entered politics, and was a member of the executive committee of the municipal council of Sør-Varanger Municipality from 1910 to 1922; also a school board member from 1910 to 1916. In the 1921 Norwegian parliamentary election he was elected to the Parliament of Norway. He was a member of the Standing Committee on Roads. In 1923, before the parliamentary term was over, he left the Labour Party and joined the Communist Party. He headed their ballot in the subsequent elections of 1924, 1927, 1930 and 1933, but was never again re-elected.

He was married to cultural worker Kathrine Bugge (née Hanssen, 1877–1951) from December 1922. He died in May 1935, aged 55.
