= Oscar Egede-Nissen =

Norwegian actor (1903–1976)

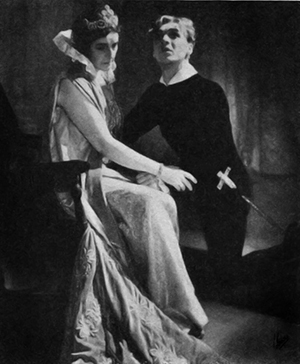
- Oscar Egede-Nissen in Hamlet
- Born: March 7, 1903; Kristiania (now Oslo), Norway
- Died: November 1, 1976 (aged 73); Norway
- Occupation: Actor
- Spouse: Unni Torkildsen
- Parents: Adam Egede-Nissen (father); Goggi Egede-Nissen (mother)
- Relatives: Stig Egede-Nissen, Gerd Grieg, Aud Richter, Ada Kramm, Lill Egede-Nissen, Gøril Havrevold

Oscar Egede-Nissen (March 7, 1903 – November 1, 1976) was a Norwegian actor. He appeared in dozens of films from his debut in 1936 onward, his last being An-Magritt in 1969.

Egede-Nissen was an unruly child, and he was sent to the alternative Odenwald School in Germany. He came home and started high school, but soon left again, this time on a long trip to South America. He went whaling and spent time in Buenos Aires. He ended up as an illegal immigrant to the United States, where he became a professional soldier and flew to the Philippines. There he had a falling out with a lieutenant, and he was sentenced to ten years' imprisonment. With the help of connections in Norway, including Prime Minister Johan Ludwig Mowinckel, he was pardoned after 14 months.

When he returned to Norway this time, his own abilities—and the family's connections—in theater became decisive for his future. He started performing at the National Theater in Bergen, where he made his debut in Hamlet in 1932, playing opposite the famous Magda Blanc. He was successful in the role and was engaged at the theater.

During the Second World War he was arrested on January 6, 1941, and on February 21 he was placed in Vollan Prison. On February 17, 1942, he was transferred to Bredtveit Prison, before being released on March 2.

Egede-Nissen was also imprisoned in the Cameroonian city of Douala for several summer months in 1955 as the result of a fight ending in a death on the Oslo-registered boat Slemdal on May 3, 1955. Three years later, he appeared in Arne Skouen's film Pastor Jarman kommer hjem in the role of a stoker, which he had personal experience with. Similarly, three years later he played a prisoner in a drunken arrest in the film Hans Nielsen Hauge (1961). Before the Second World War, Egede-Nissen appeared in Tancred Ibsen's film Valfångare (1939) as the helmsman Olav Lykke. In Vi vil leve from 1946, he played the telegraph operator Harald. He also had a bit role in the film Freske fraspark, which was based on Kjell Aukrust's stories. In addition, he played a number of roles in various productions for NRK's Radio Theater.

Egede-Nissen was the son of the patriarch of the Communist Party of Norway Adam Egede-Nissen and Goggi Egede-Nissen. He was the brother of the actors Aud Richter, Gerd Grieg, Ada Kramm, Stig Egede-Nissen, Lill Egede-Nissen, and Gøril Havrevold. His wife Unni Torkildsen (1901–1968) was also an actress.

== Selected filmography ==
- 1936: Vi bygger landet as Ole Larsen
- 1936: Vi vil oss et land... as a worker
- 1937: By og land hand i hand as Ole Larsen, a speculator
- 1937: Bra mennesker as Peder Basen
- 1937: Fant as Oscar
- 1939: Valfångare as Olav Lykke, the helmsman
- 1940: Bastard as Vasily's Russian friend
- 1942: Trysil-Knut as a log rafter
- 1943: Vigdis as a farm boy
- 1943: Den nye lægen as Jentoft
- 1944: Kommer du, Elsa? as a vagabond
- 1946: Englandsfarere as Cramer
- 1946: Vi vil leve as Harald Bakken
- 1951: Skadeskutt as a doctor
- 1953: Ung frue forsvunnet as Jørn
- 1954: Suicide Mission as Peter Salen
- 1955: Hjem går vi ikke
- 1956: Kvinnens plass as a man that saw a UFO
- 1958: Pastor Jarman kommer hjem as a stoker
- 1959: Herren og hans tjenere
- 1961: Hans Nielsen Hauge as the man arrested for drunkenness
- 1963: Freske fraspark as a Tynset resident
- 1963: Vildanden as Pettersen
- 1963: An-Magritt as Jürgen, a smelter
