= Prinsessen som ingen kunne målbinde =

1932 film

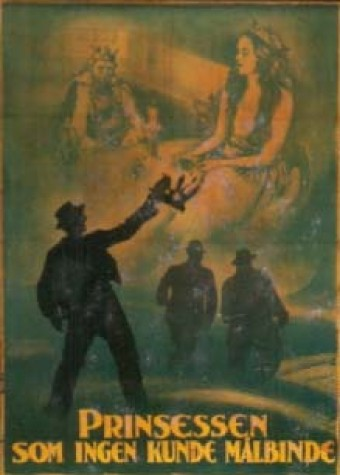
- Directed by: Walter Fürst
- Written by: Alf Rød
- Based on: Peter Christen Asbjørnsen's story "Prinsessen som ingen kunne målbinde"
- Produced by: Walter Fürst
- Starring: Harald Stormoen; Unni Torkildsen; Andreas Aabel
- Cinematography: Reidar Lund
- Edited by: Walter Fürst
- Distributed by: Kommunenes filmcentral
- Release date: May 2, 1932
- Running time: 35 minutes
- Country: Norway
- Language: Norwegian

Prinsessen som ingen kunne målbinde (The Princess Who Always Had to Have the Last Word) is a Norwegian short film from 1932 based on the fairytale of the same name by Peter Christen Asbjørnsen. Harald Stormoen starred as the king, Andreas Aabel as Askeladd, and Unni Torkildsen as the princess. The film was directed by Walter Fürst.

== Plot ==
At the royal court, the beautiful and loud-mouthed princess is amused by all her stupid suitors, who are thrown out one by one because they cannot marry her. Outside the old stave church, the king's soldiers read out the regulation on branding. Poor Askeladd and his two smug older brothers decide to set off to try their luck. To everyone's astonishment, Askeladd manages to best the princess, and the two brothers fail. Askeladd is rewarded with the princess and half the kingdom, and the brothers are branded.

== Cast ==
- Andreas Aabel as Askeladd
- Harald Stormoen as the king
- Unni Torkildsen as the princess
- Egil Hjorth-Jenssen as Pål
- Eugen Skjønberg as Per
- Finn Bernhoft as the ensign
- Johannes Jensen as the master
- Marie Hedemark as the brothers' mother
- Birger Løvaas as the suitor
