= Ragnvald Ingebrigtsen =

Norwegian physician (1882–1975)

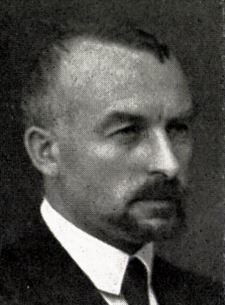
Ragnvald Ingebrigtsen

Ragnvald Ingebrigtsen (30 November 1882 – 13 January 1975) was a Norwegian physician who is regarded a pioneer in the development of surgery, particularly neurosurgery, in Norway.

== Biography ==
Ingebrigsten was born in Hammerfest and attended school in Trondheim. He graduated as cand.med. in 1907, and worked as an assistant physician in Stavanger from 1908 to 1911. He then worked two years at the Rockefeller Institute in New York City, where he studied neurosurgery under the mentorship of Alexis Carrel. He further studied bacteriology and histology at the Pasteur Institute in Paris in 1913.

He returned to Norway in 1913 as an assistant physician in the pathology department of the Rikshospitalet in Oslo, and went back to Paris to work in the surgical department of the Hôpital du Panthéon from 1916 to 1918. He was awarded dr.med in 1918 and thereafter worked as a surgeon at the Rikshospitalet. He then worked at Stavanger Hospital until his appointment as professor in surgery at the University of Oslo from 1928, holding this position as well as a surgical consultant position at the Rikshospitalet until 1954.

He received too the Médaille de la Reconnaissance française, bronze, in 1920 for his action as benevolent in the chirurgical service of the hospital of Pantin. He was decorated Knight, First Class of the Order of St. Olav in 1959 and of the Danish Order of the Dannebrog.

Ingeborg was married to actress Gerd Egede-Nissen from 1922 to 1940, and to the sister of his first wife, Gøril Havrevold, from 1962. He died on 13 January 1975 in Oslo.
