= Ships and People =

1920 film

- German: Schiffe und Menschen
- Directed by: Carl Boese
- Written by: Karl Figdor
- Produced by: Isidor Fett; Karl Wiesel
- Starring: Aud Egede-Nissen; Karl Falkenberg; Otto Gebühr
- Cinematography: Hans Karl Gottschalk
- Production company: Bayerische Filmgesellschaft
- Release date: 1920
- Country: Germany
- Languages: Silent; German intertitles

Ships and People (German: Schiffe und Menschen) is a 1920 German silent film directed by Carl Boese and starring Aud Egede-Nissen, Karl Falkenberg, and Otto Gebühr.

The art direction was by Julian Ballenstedt.

== Cast ==
In alphabetical order

- Aud Egede-Nissen as Helen Delagoa
- Karl Falkenberg
- Otto Gebühr as Ralph Washington Taylor, Sonderberichterstatter von Crookers Zeitungstrust, New York
- Nien Soen Ling as Hjisan Min Lung
- Nien Tso Ling as Großkaufmann Li
- Kurt Vespermann as Georg Hellmann
