= Gerd Grieg =

Norwegian actress (1895–1988)

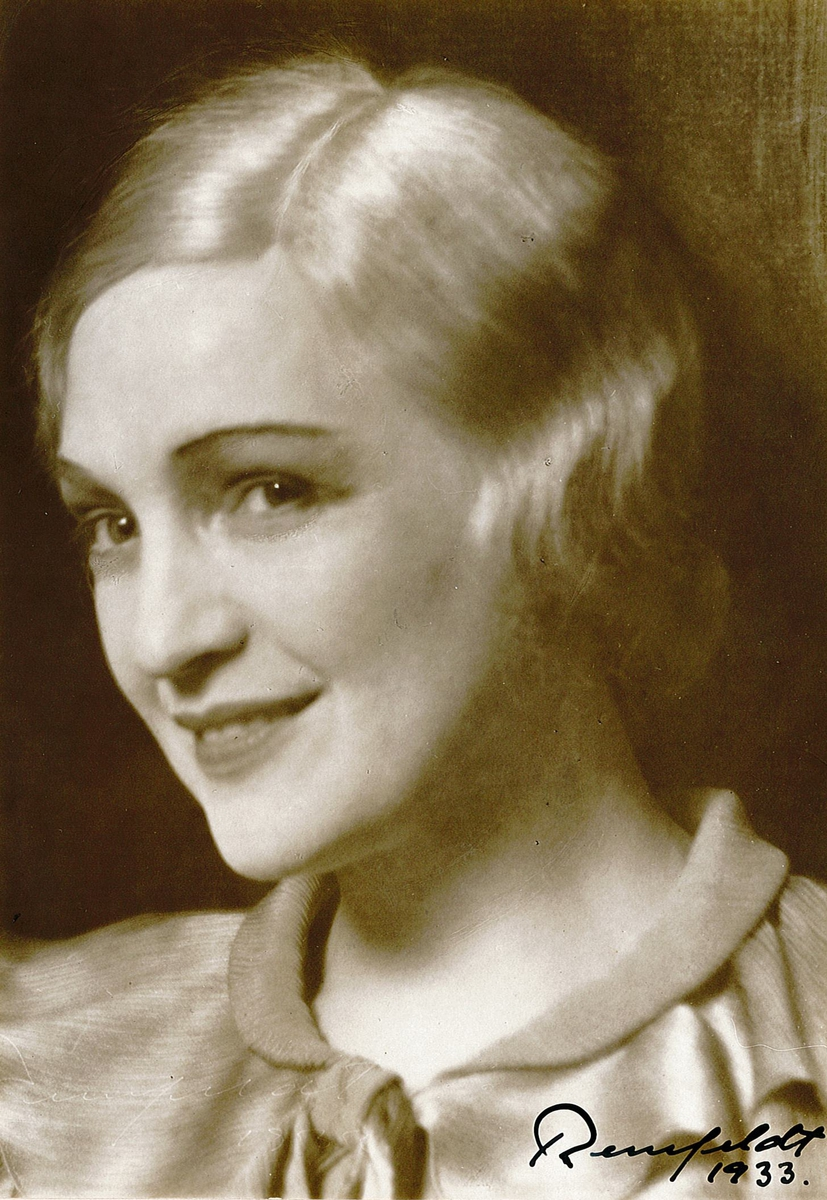
- Born: Gerd Egede-Nissen; 21 April 1895; Bergen, Norway
- Died: 9 August 1988 (aged 93); Norway
- Occupation: Actress
- Years active: 1910–1955
- Spouses: Ragnvald Ingebrigtsen (m. 1922; div. 1940) Nordahl Grieg (m. 1940; died 1943)
- Children: 3
- Parent(s): Adam Egede-Nissen; Georga Wilhelma Ellertsen
- Relatives: Aud Egede-Nissen (sister); Ada Kramm (sister); Gøril Havrevold (sister); Stig Egede-Nissen (brother); Lill Egede-Nissen (sister); Georg Richter (nephew)

Gerd Grieg (née Egede-Nissen, 21 April 1895 – 9 August 1988) was a Norwegian stage and film actress.

== Biography ==
She was born in Bergen, Norway. Her parents were Georga Wilhelma Ellertsen (1871–1959) and politician Adam Egede-Nissen (1868–1953). She had ten siblings, including Aud Egede-Nissen, Ada Kramm, Oscar Egede-Nissen, Stig Egede-Nissen, Lill Egede-Nissen, and Gøril Havrevold, who all became actors and actresses.

Gerd Grieg made her acting début at the Nationaltheatret in 1910. In 1913 she appeared in several short silent films made by Danish film director, August Blom (1869–1947). In 1917, she began her five years in Berlin to record films for the film company of her sister Aud Egede-Nissen. She returned to Norway in 1922 and to the Nationaltheatret in 1928.

During the World War II German occupation of Norway, Gerd Grieg was active in supporting the Norwegian war effort from exile in London and Iceland.

She retired from acting in 1955 and in 1957 published a book about her and her husband: Nordahl Grieg, slik jeg kjente ham (Oslo: Gyldendal. 1958).

In 1944, Gerd Grieg was appointed commander of the Order of St Olav. She was also honored with the King's Medal of Merit in Gold. She was named a great knight by the Icelandic Order of the Falcon, as well as received King Christian X's Liberty Medal for participation in the war from 1940 to 1945. She died in 1988.

== Personal life ==
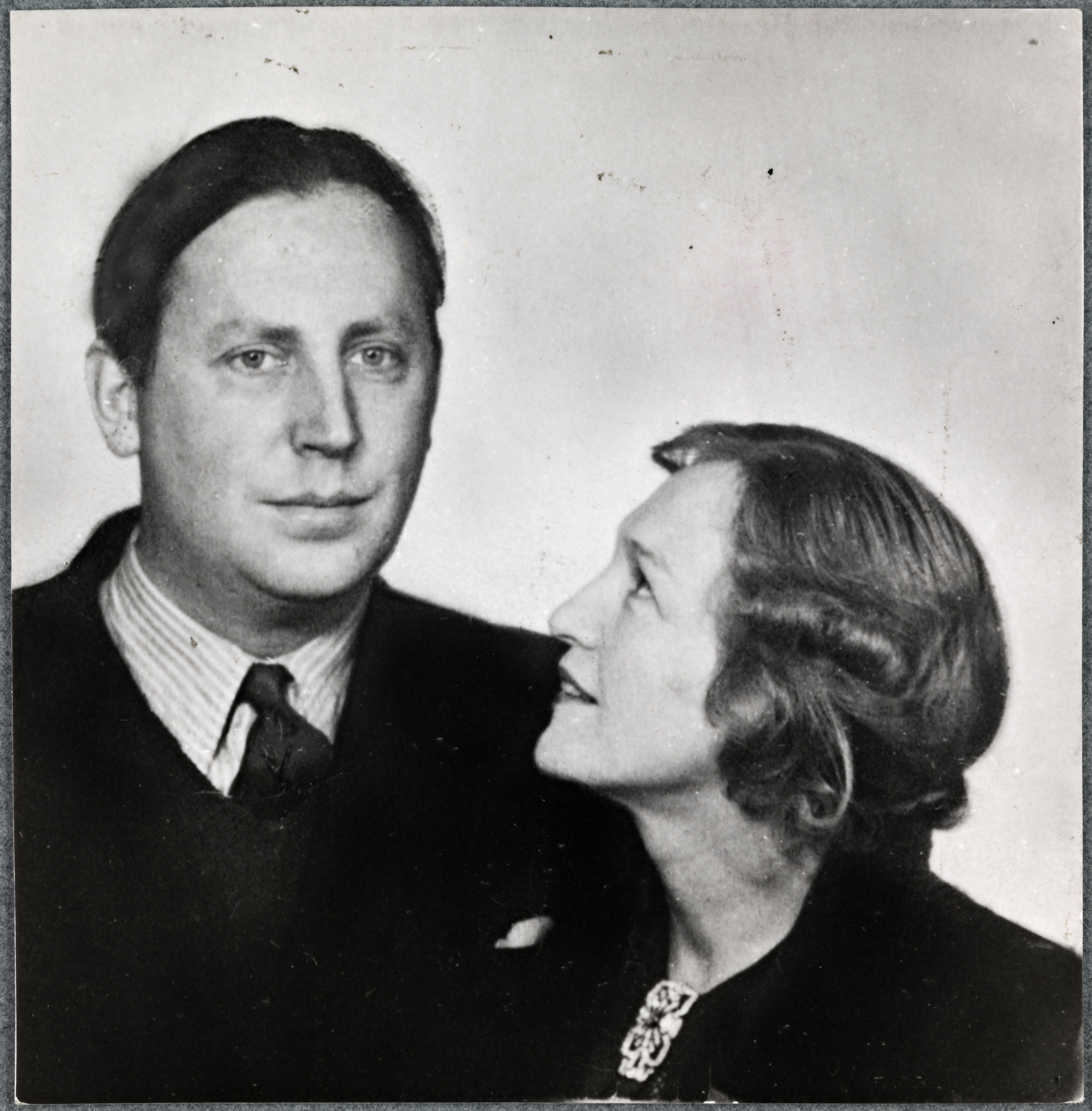
With Nordahl Grieg

She was married to surgeon Ragnvald Ingebrigtsen (1882–1975) from 1922 to 1940; they had three daughters. Ingebrigtsen later married Gerd's younger sister Gøril in 1962.

She remarried in 1940 to poet, novelist, dramatist and journalist Nordahl Grieg. Nordahl Grieg served in World War II as a war correspondent and was killed while on a bombing mission to Berlin during 1943.
