= Hans Stormoen =

Norwegian actor (1906–1979)

- Born: 29 May 1906
- Died: 4 April 1979 (aged 72)
- Spouse(s): Lill Egede-Nissen

Hans Stormoen (29 May 1906 – 4 April 1979) was a Norwegian actor.

== Family ==
Stormoen was born in Bergen, the son of the farmers Marius Stormoen and Synnøve Henriksen. He was the half-brother of the actor Harald Stormoen and the uncle of the actor Kjell Stormoen. He was first married to the actress Regina "Vesla" Stenersen, and then to the actress Lill Egede-Nissen from 1943 to 1950. He was the father of the musician and philologist Hans Marius Stormoen.

== Career ==
Stormoen made his stage debut at the National Theater in Bergen in 1934, and his breakthrough came in 1935, as Vingrisen in Nordahl Grieg's play Vår ære og vår makt. He performed at the National Theater until it was damaged in a bombing raid in June 1940. Later in World War II he joined the Norwegian Armed Forces in exile in the United Kingdom. From 1945 to 1948 he played for the Trøndelag Theater. From 1949 onward he toured with the National Traveling Theater, eventually also as a stage director for many years. He also appeared in several Norwegian films.
