= Odd Havrevold =

Norwegian physician and psychiatrist

Odd Havrevold (3 July 1900 – 1 May 1991) was a Norwegian physician and psychiatrist.

Odd Wåge Havrevold was born in Vestre Aker, Norway. He was a brother of writer Finn Havrevold and actor Olafr Havrevold. He earned his medical degree at the University of Oslo in 1926. He belonged to the first generation of Norwegian psychoanalysts, and became known internationally through his cooperation with Wilhelm Reich and Otto Fenichel. He was a co-editor of the journal Zeitschrift für Politische Psychologie und Sexualökonomie.
