= Lill Egede-Nissen =

Norwegian actress (1909–1962)

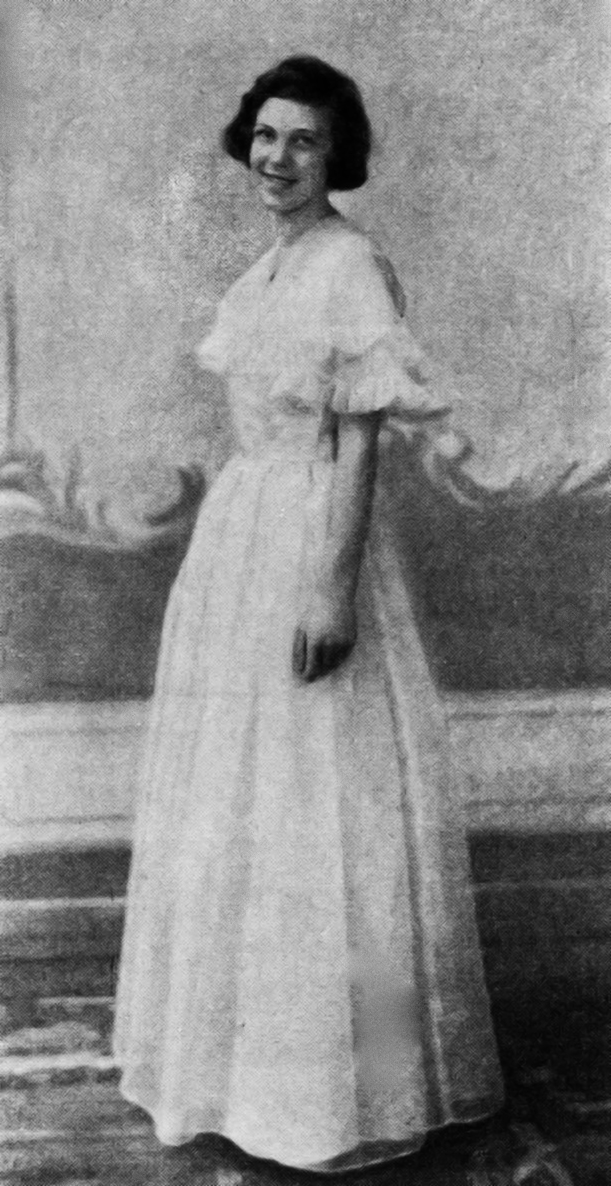
- Born: November 20, 1909; Oslo, Norway
- Died: January 20, 1962 (aged 52)
- Occupation: Actress
- Spouse: Hans Stormoen
- Children: Hans Marius Stormoen
- Parents: Adam Egede-Nissen (father); Goggi Egede-Nissen (mother)
- Relatives: Oscar Egede-Nissen; Ada Kramm; Aud Egede-Nissen; Gøril Havrevold; Gerd Grieg; Stig Egede-Nissen

Unn Goggi "Lill" Egede-Nissen (November 20, 1909 – January 20, 1962) was a Norwegian actress. She was married to the actor Hans Stormoen from 1943 to 1950, and she was the mother of the musician and philologist Hans Marius Stormoen. Egede-Nissen debuted at the National Theater in Bergen in 1932. She was engaged there until 1943, and she later performed at the Bjørnevik Theater and Trøndelag Theater.

Egede-Nissen made her debut in the comedy Patsy. Her later roles included Gretchen in Faust, Mrs. Elvsted in Hedda Gabler, Kathinka Stordal in the play Kranes konditori, and Tale in Medmenneske. She played the title role in Anne Pedersdotter on NRK's radio theater.

Lill Egede-Nissen was the daughter of the Communist Party of Norway leader Adam Egede-Nissen and Goggi Egede-Nissen. She was the sister of the actors and actresses Aud Egede-Nissen, Gerd Grieg, Ada Kramm, Oscar Egede-Nissen, Stig Egede-Nissen, and Gøril Havrevold.
