= Aud Egede-Nissen =

Norwegian actress (1893–1974)

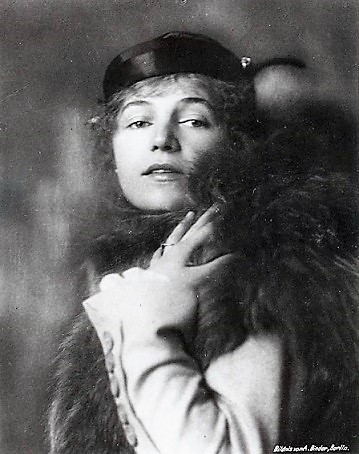
- Aud Egede-Nissen, 1920s
- Born: 30 May 1893; Bergen, Norway
- Died: 15 November 1974 (aged 81); Oslo, Norway
- Other names: Aud Richter
- Occupation: Actress
- Years active: 1914–1942
- Spouses: Georg Alexander (m. 1915; div. 1924) Paul Richter (m. 1924; div. 1931) Dag Havrevold (m. 1940)
- Children: Georg Richter (1915–1972); Dag Havrevold, Jr. (1938–2011)
- Parents: Adam Egede-Nissen; Georga Wilhelma Ellertsen
- Relatives: Gerd Grieg (sister); Ada Kramm (sister); Oscar Egede-Nissen (brother); Gøril Havrevold (sister); Stig Egede-Nissen (brother); Lill Egede-Nissen (sister)

Aud Egede-Nissen (30 May 1893 – 15 November 1974) was a Norwegian actress, director and producer. She appeared in many early 20th-century German silent films.

== Early life ==
Born in Bergen, Norway in 1893, Egede-Nissen was a daughter of Norwegian postmaster and politician Adam Hjalmar Egede-Nissen (1868–1953) and his wife Georga "Goggi" Wilhelma Ellertsen (1871–1959); she had ten siblings. Four of her younger sisters and two younger brothers also became actors: Gerd Grieg (1895–1988), Ada Kramm (1899–1981), Oscar Egede-Nissen (1903–1976), Stig Egede-Nissen (1907–1988), Lill Egede-Nissen (1909–1962) and Gøril Havrevold (1914–1992).

== German film career ==
Aud made her acting debut on the Norwegian stage in 1911, appearing next in Norwegian director Bjørn Bjørnson's 1913 film Scenens børn. In 1913 she moved to Denmark and started working for Dania Biofilm Kompagni in Copenhagen. In 1914, Bjørn Bjørnson invited her to Berlin, where there were opportunities in the rapidly expanding film industry. In 1916, she appeared in Otto Rippert's six-part sci-fi serial Homunculus. Also that year, she starred as the character "Christine Daaé" in a German adaptation, directed by Ernst Matray, of Gaston Leroux's novel The Phantom of the Opera opposite Swedish actor Nils Olaf Chrisander.

From 1917 Aud Egede-Nissen was not contented with being an actor in other companies' films in Berlin. In partnership with her husband Georg Alexander, she started the Egede-Nissen Film Co. (Egede-Nissen Filmbyrå) where she was the artistic and financial manager. Alexander directed most of their films, while Aud Egede-Nissen and her sisters Ada Kramm and Gerd Grieg usually played the female lead roles. Production notes suggest that these were mainly melodramas in serial form or detective films. In the two years between 1917 and 1919 her film company produced at least 29 films. Harder times and centralization in the German film industry after World War I ultimately contributed to the closing of Egede-Nissen's film company at the beginning of the 1920s. In 1920, she starred in two films directed by Ernst Lubitsch.

In the period before 1931 she acted in over 80 films and directed 18 more, having worked with many noted directors of early German cinema, including Ernst Lubitsch, Fritz Lang, F. W. Murnau, Karl Grune, and Gerhard Lamprecht. She had major roles in movies of 1922 including Fritz Lang's Dr. Mabuse, the Gambler and F. W. Murnau's Phantom. Paul Richter, who was to become her second husband, also had a role in Dr. Mabuse. In 1924, the year Aud married him, he ascended to superstar status, taking the lead role of King Siegfried in Lang's Die Nibelungen. Along with Paul Richter, Aud also played in the 1928 Norwegian-German co-production Snowshoe Bandits (German: Schneeschuhbanditen) and based on a crime novel by Nils Lie and Nordahl Grieg. Egede-Nissen's German film career came to an end shortly after the advent of sound films, though she did return to Norway to make two films there in the 1940s.

== Personal life ==
Egede-Nissen was twice married to actors. In 1915 she married the German actor Georg Alexander (1888–1945), by whom she had her son Georg Richter (1915–1972); in 1924 they divorced, and from 1924 to 1931 she was married to the Austrian actor Paul Richter (1895–1961). Upon their marriage, Richter adopted her nine-year-old son Georg Richter who became an actor and film producer. In 1940, she married a third time, to Dag Havrevold (1911–1994). Together they had a son, Dag Havrevold, Jr. (1938–2011). Havrevold's brother was Olafr Havrevold, who later married (and divorced) Aud's sister, Gøril.

Aud Egede-Nissen died in Oslo, Norway at the age of 81.

== Selected filmography ==
- Die Filmprinzessin (1914)
- Mobilmachung in der Küche (1914)
- Das Phantom der Oper (1916)
- Homunculus (1916)
- Sumurun (1920)
- The Closed Chain (1920)
- Temperamental Artist (1920)
- Das Geheimnis der Chrysanthemen (1920)
- Anna Boleyn (1920)
- Ships and People (1920)
- The Raft of the Dead (1921)
- The Terror of the Red Mill (1921)
- Night of the Burglar (1921)
- The Maharaja's Favourite Wife (1921)
- The Secret of the Mummy (1921)
- Dr. Mabuse, der Spieler (1921)
- Lucrezia Borgia (1922)
- Phantom (1922)
- A Dying Nation (1922)
- The Expulsion (1923)
- The Street (1923)
- Carousel (1923)
- Carlos and Elisabeth (1924)
- The New Land (1924)
- Slums of Berlin (1925)
- Peter the Pirate (1925)
- The Red Mouse (1926)
- People to Each Other (1926)
- The Ones Down There (1926)
- The Armoured Vault (1926)
- Eternal Allegiance (1926)
- Battle of the Sexes (1926)
- Sister Veronika (1927)
- Lord of the Night (1927)
- King of the Centre Forwards (1927)
- The Villa in Tiergarten Park (1927)
- Snowshoe Bandits (1928)
- The Woman in the Advocate's Gown (1929)
- Eskimo (1930)
- Between Night and Dawn (1931)
- Hansen og Hansen (Norway, 1941)
- Trysil-Knut (Norway, 1942); Swedish title Nordlandets våghals

== Other sources ==
- Fullerton, John; Olsson, Jan, eds. (1999). Nordic Explorations: Film Before 1930. Sydney: John Libbey & Company, Ltd. ISBN 978-1-86462-055-9.
