= Ada Kramm =

Norwegian actress (1899–1981)

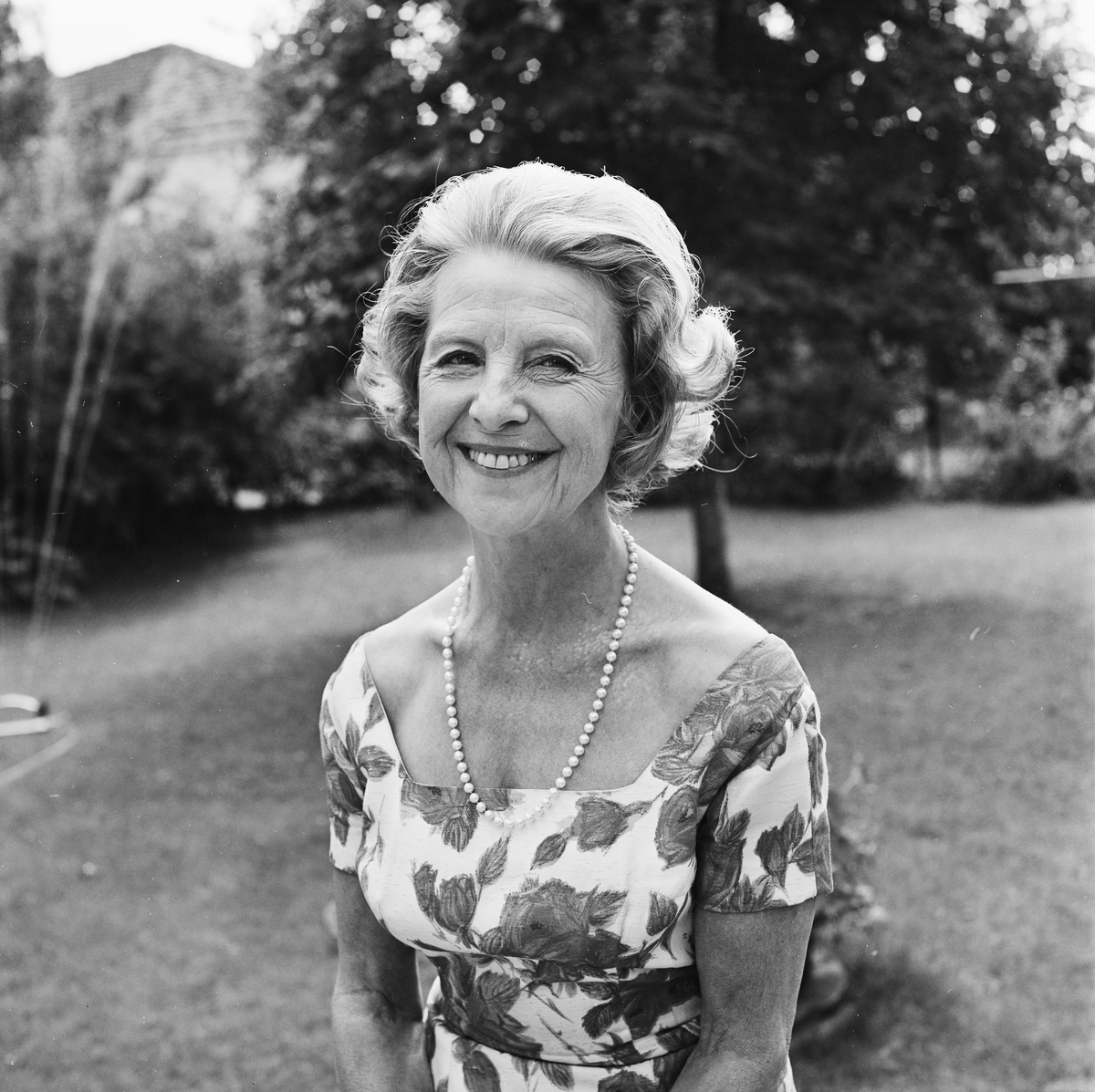
- Ada Kramm in 1966
- Born: Ada Egede-Nissen; 14 March 1899; Vardø, Finnmark, Norway
- Died: 17 December 1981 (aged 82); Oslo, Norway
- Resting place: Oslo Western Civil Cemetery
- Occupation: Actress
- Years active: 1916–1979
- Spouse: Hugo Kramm (m. 1920; died 1958)
- Children: 1
- Parent(s): Adam Egede-Nissen; Georga Wilhelma Ellertsen
- Relatives: Aud Egede-Nissen (sister); Oscar Egede-Nissen (brother); Gøril Havrevold (sister); Gerd Grieg (sister); Stig Egede-Nissen (brother); Lill Egede-Nissen (sister); Georg Richter (nephew)

Ada Kramm (née Egede-Nissen, 14 March 1899 – 17 December 1981) was a Norwegian stage and film actress whose career spanned more than six decades.

== Early life and career ==
Born Ada Egede-Nissen in Vardø, Finnmark, Norway, her parents were the Norwegian politician Adam Egede-Nissen (1868–1952) and Georga ("Goggi") Wilhelma Ellertsen (1871–1959). She had ten siblings; six of her siblings, Aud Egede-Nissen (1893–1974), Gerd Grieg (1895–1988), Oscar Egede-Nissen (1903–1976), Stig Egede-Nissen (1907–1988), Lill Egede-Nissen (1909–1962) and Gøril Havrevold (1914–1992), became stage and film actors. When she was eleven years old, the family moved to Stavanger, where she began studying at the Stavanger Faste Scene (Stavanger Fixed Scene) theatre. She made her stage début in 1916 in Selma Lagerlöf's Dunungen.

In 1917, Kramm accompanied her two older sisters Aud and Gerd to Berlin, Germany where the three young women opened a small film production and distribution company called the Egede-Nissen Film Company The trio used the studio to promote themselves in film roles directed by George Alexander from 1917 until 1920. Kramm appeared in a number of crime serials as the character Ada van Ehler beginning in 1917. In 1920 she married German violinist Hugo Kramm and began using her married name as a professional moniker and the young newly-weds returned to Norway. They later had a daughter together, actress Ilse Kramm (born 1934).

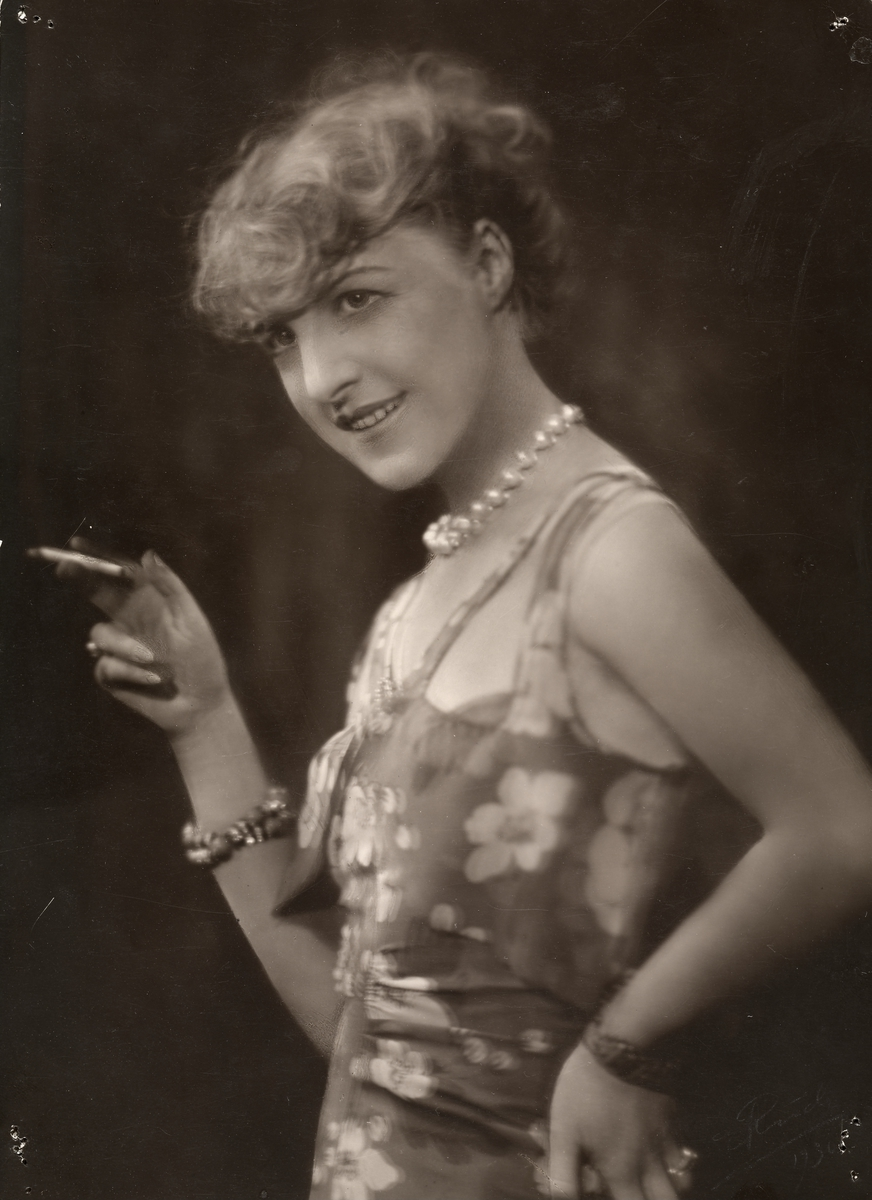
Ada Kramm in a 1930 promotional portrait for her role in Don Juan at Det Nye Teater.

From 1921 until 1924 Kramm appeared at the Bergen and Den Nationale Scene. After her husband joined the Oslo Philharmonic Orchestra in 1924 they moved to Oslo and she worked at Det Nye Teater (The New Theatre) from 1925 until 1928, the Centralteatret (Central Theatre) from 1928 to 1934 and later at the Nationaltheatret (National Theatre). She also returned to film, and appeared in roles in the 1928 Norwegian-German coproduction of Schneeschuhbanditen opposite her sister Aud Egede-Nissen and Austrian actor Paul Richter and 1930's Eskimo opposite Mona Mårtenson and again with Paul Richter.

== Later career and death ==
Kramm spent the next several decades on Norwegian stages in productions by Henrik Ibsen, August Strindberg, Tennessee Williams and Arthur Miller. At age 72 she appeared in the role of Aunt Julie in Hedda Gabler on a tour of Japan. After over six decades on stage, she went into semi-retirement and occasionally made appearances on Norwegian television. Her last role before her death was in the 1979 Anja Breien-directed, Palme d'Or nominated dramatic film Arven (Heritage) with Espen Skjønberg, Anita Björk and Jan Hårstad.

She died on 17 December 1981 in Oslo at age eighty-two.

== Awards ==
- Teaterkritikerprisen (Norwegian Theatre Critics Award), 1947–1948 for her role as Amanda Wingfield in The Glass Menagerie by Tennessee Williams
- King's Medal of Merit in Gold
- Order of St. Olav, Knight, First Class, 1977

== Filmography ==
Year	Title	Role	Notes
1917	Ein Detektiv-Duell		
1917	Das Geheimnis der Briefmarke		
1917	Der weinende Dieb		
1917	Der Kampf um den Sturmvogel		
1919	Erblich belastet	Tochter Mirjam Vandrey	
1919	Luxuspflänzchen	Gerda	
1928	Snowshoe Bandits	Eva Krohn	
1930	Eskimo	Annie	
1932	The White God	Anny	
1951	Storfolk og småfolk	Husfruen	
1979	Arven	Fru Marie Skaug	(final film role)
