= Hans Marius Stormoen =

Norwegian musician, philologist, and actor

- Born: February 7, 1943; Bergen, Norway
- Died: June 1, 2006 (aged 63)
- Occupations: Musician, philologist, and actor
- Parents: Hans Stormoen (father); Lill Egede-Nissen (mother)

Hans Marius Stormoen (February 7, 1943 – June 1, 2006) was a Norwegian bass player, philologist, and actor. He was the son of the actor Hans Stormoen and the actress Lill Egede-Nissen.

Stormoen's interest in bass was aroused in Denmark, where he soon became acquainted with Niels-Henning Ørsted Pedersen, and then in Oslo's jazz and blues scene in the 1960s and 1970s. He was part of Arild Wikstrøm's quartet (1961–1963) and in Jan Garbarek's first band, where he was named Norwegian jazz champion in 1963. Stormoen was thus central to the environment at Club 7 (together with Bill Mulholland), from where he produced and participated in the 25-years album (MAI, 1988). He also played in rhythm & blues bands such as Public Enemies, The Dream with Terje Rypdal, and Bryggerigangen Bluesband. In the 1960s he collaborated with George Russell and Karin Krog.

After moving to France, he worked under the artistic name Jean Marie bassist, ran a jazz club with Nissa Nyberget, toured with guitarist Jan Berger, and toured with saxophonist Archie Shepp's quartet in 1997 and 1998. Stormoen also worked as a translator; his translations include Bob Dylan's autobiography (N. W. Damm & Søn, 2004).

== Filmography ==
- 1963: Særlingen (TV movie) as the new prisoner
- 1964: Minne om to mandager (TV movie) as Bert
- 1966: Hurra for Andersens! as a musician (in Public Enemies)
