= Stig Egede-Nissen =

Norwegian actor and naval officer (1907–1988)

- Born: December 11, 1907; Kristiania (now Oslo), Norway
- Died: October 4, 1988 (aged 80)
- Resting place: Old Aker Cemetery
- Occupation: Actor
- Spouse: Randi Brænne
- Parents: Adam Egede-Nissen (father); Goggi Egede-Nissen (mother)
- Relatives: Oscar Egede-Nissen; Ada Kramm; Aud Egede-Nissen; Gøril Havrevold; Gerd Grieg; Lill Egede-Nissen
- Awards: St. Olav's Medal with Oak Branch

Stig Egede-Nissen (December 11, 1907 – October 4, 1988) was a Norwegian actor and naval officer.

== Biography ==
Egede-Nissen was born in Kristiania (now Oslo), Norway. He was the son of Communist Party of Norway leader Adam Egede-Nissen and Goggi Egede-Nissen. He was the brother of the actors and actresses Aud Egede-Nissen, Gerd Grieg, Ada Kramm, Oscar Egede-Nissen, Lill Egede-Nissen, and Gøril Havrevold.

He discontinued his studies in medicine and studied at the Norwegian Institute of Technology until 1935, before studying theater at the Carnegie Institute of Technology in Pittsburgh from 1935 to 1938. Back in Trondheim, he made his debut at the Trøndelag Theater and then moved to Oslo, where he was at the Carl Johan Theater from 1940 to 1942.

During the war, he was arrested on May 24, 1941, and taken to the jail in Oslo. He was released after a month and a half, on July 5. In 1942 he fled the country via Sweden to England. He was in the Royal Navy and learned telegraphy before being stationed on HMS Wensleydale in 1944. As a lieutenant he picked up and decoded messages from the Germans. He took part in the Battle of Normandy in 1944, and he took part in Operation Polar Bear VI in 1945.

Egede-Nissen was again at Trøndelag Theater from 1945 to 1947. From 1947 to 1967 he was at The New Theater, often read for NRK radio, and had a season with the National Traveling Theater. He concluded his career with freelance acting at the Norwegian Theater, Trøndelag Theater, and National Theater from 1967 to 1976. Egede-Nissen was on the board and management committee of the Norwegian Actors' Equity Association.

In the 1950s, Egede-Nissen began to restore five of the 17th-century homes on Damstredet in Oslo; this work was continued by his thirty-year-younger wife Unni Gärtner Egede-Nissen (1937–2004).

== Filmography ==
- 1944: The Return of the Vikings
- 1946: Om kjærligheten synger de
- 1948: Scott of the Antarctic
- 1951: Flukten fra Dakar
- 1954: Aldri annet enn bråk
- 1957: Toya & Heidi
- 1958: I slik en natt
- 1961: Fru Inger til Østråt, TV
- 1964: Marenco
- 1966: Broder Gabrielsen
- 1972: Fysiske fordeler, episode of Fleksnes Fataliteter, TV

== Awards ==
- St. Olav's Medal with Oak Branch for contribution to the war effort
