= Public Enemies (group) =

Norwegian band

- Origin: Oslo, Norway
- Genres: Rhythm and blues
- Years active: 1965–1967
- Labels: Thunder; Volt; Sonet

Public Enemies was a Norwegian rhythm and blues band from Oslo, known for its performances at Club 7 and later work with Karin Krog. They released a notable version of Sunny and Watermelon Man with Karin Krog. The group toured Northern Europe, sharing stages with, among others, Steve Winwood from Traffic.

== Band members ==
The members of Public Enemies were Hans Petter Holm (vocals, guitar, bass), Bjørn Johansen (guitar, vocals), Thomas Berg Monsen (harmonica, vocals), Arild Boman (organ), Hans Marius Stormoen (bass) and Jan Lie (drums, vocals).

== Success ==
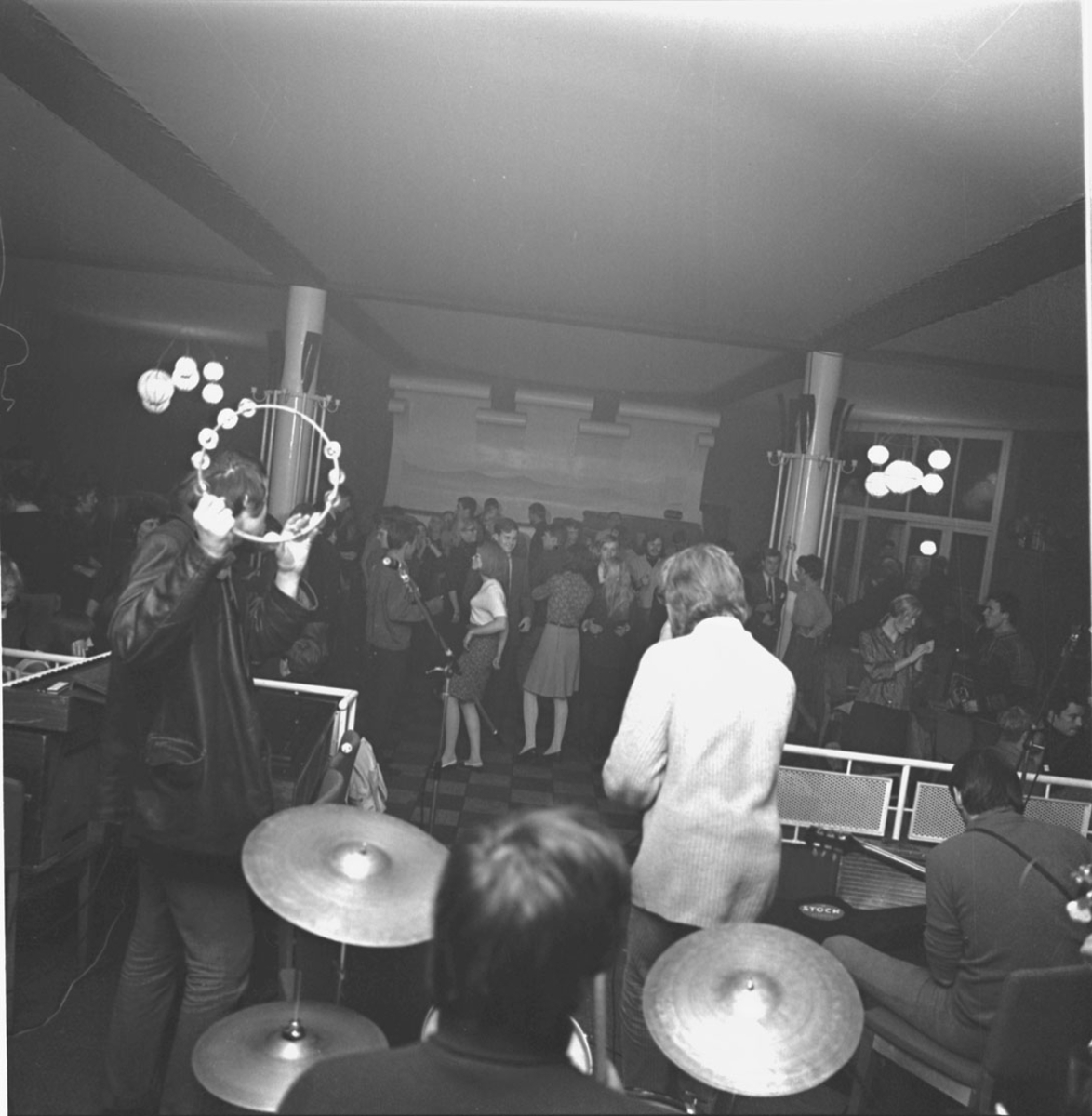
Public Enemies in 1966

Public Enemies was voted the most popular band in Norway in 1966, with a good margin down to The Pussycats. They featured in the Norwegian film Hurra for Andersens, performing their hit single "Shotgun". Later that year "Shotgun" reached #7 on Radio Luxembourg Top 20, making Public Enemies the first Norwegian band with success on international hit lists. Their 1967 album From Public Enemies Without Love, simply titled Public Enemies, was released also in Italy with a different cover on the Thunder label.

== Dissolution ==
In 1967 Christian Reim (organ) joined Public Enemies. The band was dissolved the same year when Hans Marius Stormoen and Reim went on to form Dream with Terje Rypdal. Bjørn Johansen and Jan Lie later formed the band The Prophets.

== Discography ==
- I Call It Pretty Music (EP, 1965)
- Elevate Me (EP, Volt, 1965)
- Believe Me (EP, Thunder, 1966)
- Shotgun (EP, Triola, 1966)
- Familien Andersen (EP, 1966)
- Sunny/Whole Lotta Shakin' Goin' On (EP, Sonet, featuring Karin Krog, 1966)
- From Public Enemies Without Love (LP, Sonet, 1966)
- Public Enemies (LP, Thunder, 1966)
