= Olafr Havrevold =

Norwegian engineer and actor

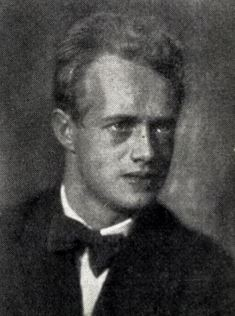
- Born: 26 May 1895; Kristiania, Norway
- Died: 11 July 1972 (aged 77); Oslo
- Education: Liberal arts; Chemical engineering
- Alma mater: University of Washington; Norwegian Institute of Technology
- Occupation: Actor
- Spouses: Unni Torkildsen; Gøril Egede-Nissen (m. 1934)
- Partner: Liv Strømsted
- Relatives: Finn Havrevold (brother); Odd Havrevold (brother)
- Awards: Norwegian Theatre Critics Award (1939); King's Medal of Merit in gold (1951); Order of Vasa

Olafr Havrevold (26 May 1895 – 11 July 1972) was a Norwegian engineer and actor.

== Biography ==
He was born at Christiania (now Oslo), Norway. He was the son of Lauritz Paulsen Havrevold (1859–1940) and Marta Malena Nielsen (1873–1927). He was a brother of writer Finn Havrevold (1905–1988) and psychiatrist Odd Havrevold (1900–1991). After graduating artium 1914 and a year of study in liberal arts at the University of Washington in Seattle, he graduated as a chemistry engineer at Norwegian Institute of Technology (NTH) in Trondheim during 1920.

He made his stage debut at the short-lived Intimteatret in Oslo during 1922. He worked for the National Theater in Oslo from 1923 to 1965. He also played for Radioteatret and Fjernsynsteatret. He held the presidency in the Norwegian Stage Instructor's Association from 1954 to 1959 and participated in the board of the State Teaterskole from 1956.

In 1939 he received the Norwegian Theatre Critics Award (Teaterkritikerprisen) jointly with Lars Tvinde. In 1951 he won the King's Medal of Merit (Kongens fortjenstmedalje) in gold. He was decorated Knight of the Swedish Order of Vasa.

== Personal life ==
He was married twice, to Unni Torkildsen (1901–1968) and Gøril Egede-Nissen (1914–1992). He died in 1972 and was buried at Vestre gravlund in Oslo.
