= Finn Havrevold =

Norwegian illustrator, novelist and playwright (1905–1988)

- Born: 11 August 1905; Kristiania, Norway
- Died: 18 February 1988 (aged 82)
- Education: Norwegian Institute of Technology
- Occupations: Novelist, short story writer, children's writer, playwright, theatre critic, and illustrator
- Relatives: Olafr Havrevold (brother); Odd Havrevold (brother)
- Awards: Mads Wiel Nygaard's Endowment (1972)

Finn Havrevold (11 August 1905 – 18 February 1988) was a Norwegian novelist, short story writer, children's writer, playwright, illustrator and theatre critic.

== Personal life ==
Havrevold was born in Kristiania as the son of wholesaler Lauritz Paulsen Havrevold and Marta Malena Nielsen. He was a brother of actor Olafr Havrevold and psychiatrist Odd Havrevold. He was married to journalist Gunvor Øwre.

== Career ==
Havrevold was educated as architect, graduating from the Norwegian Institute of Technology in 1929. In the 1930s he worked as a freelance book illustrator. He made his literary debut in 1939 with the short story collection Det raker ikke Andersen, about juvenile loneliness and uncertainty. His novel Til de dristige from 1946 describes a war hero who lost his girlfriend to his brother during the war. In 1947 he published the novel Walter den fredsommelige, followed by Skredet from 1949. In the 1950s he wrote radio critics for the newspaper Dagbladet, and theatre critics for the magazine Urd. Havrevold's first book for children was Sommereventyret from 1952, about the tough girl "Tine" and the sissy "Jan". Drømmeveggen from 1953 pictures how "Mia"'s daydreams interfere with her daily activities. Den ensomme kriger from 1955 is about "Edvard" whose playing roles become a bit too realistic, for instance when he is a pirate leader or detective. In Marens lille ugle from 1957, "Maren" has a small toy owl who needs comfort every time Maren is scared. The book was adapted into a film by Ivo Caprino, called Ugler i mosen.

Havrevold's first play was the comedy Jubileum from 1951. His play Uretten premiered at Nationaltheatret in January 1955, staged by Agnes Mowinckel. The heroin character "Helle", played by Liv Strømsted is surrounded by three miserable men. The play resulted in a fierce debate on women's rights. The play Tomannsboligen was staged at Nationaltheatret in February 1960. The setting is two very different married couples sharing a duplex house. He wrote several audio plays for Radioteatret. His play Gruppen from 1968 was staged at Oslo Nye Teater. Havrevold published the misanthropic novel Den ytterste dag in 1963, the novel De gjenstridige in 1965, and the modernist novel Blå rytter in 1968. From 1977 to 1980 he wrote a series of autobiographical books.

He was awarded the Mads Wiel Nygaard's Endowment in 1972.
