= Gøril Havrevold =

Norwegian actress (1914–1992)

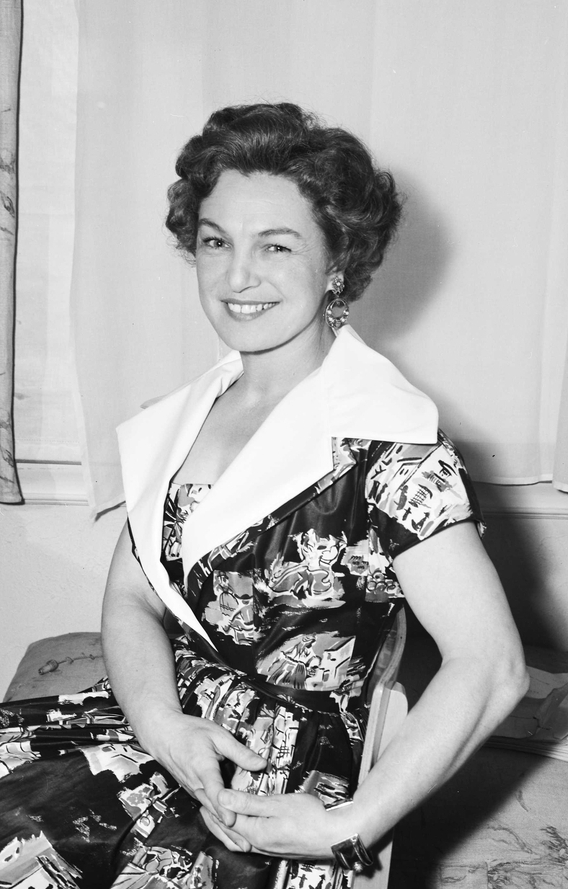
- Born: 11 July 1914; Stavanger, Norway
- Died: 17 March 1992 (aged 77); Oslo, Norway
- Occupation: Actress
- Spouses: Olafr Havrevold (m. 1934, divorced) Ragnvald Ingebrigtsen (m. 1962; died 1975)
- Children: 3
- Parent(s): Adam Egede-Nissen; Georga Wilhelma Ellertsen
- Relatives: Aud Egede-Nissen (sister); Ada Kramm (sister); Gerd Grieg (sister); Stig Egede-Nissen (brother); Lill Egede-Nissen (sister); Georg Richter (nephew)

Gøril Havrevold, (née Egede-Nissen, 11 July 1914 – 17 March 1992) was a Norwegian stage and film actress.

== Biography ==
She was born in Stavanger, Norway; the daughter of Adam Egede-Nissen (1868–1953) and Georga Wilhelma Ellertsen (1871–1959). she was the youngest of eleven siblings, seven of whom were actors, most of them at the Nationaltheatret. Among her siblings were the actresses Aud Richter (1893–1974), Gerd Grieg (1895–1988), Ada Kramm (1899–1981), and Lill Egede-Nissen (1909–1962) and the actor Stig Egede-Nissen.

Havrevold made her stage debut at Nationaltheatret in 1932, and worked for this theatre for more than fifty years, acting in a large number of plays. Her film debut was in En glad gutt from 1932, and she also played in Syndere i sommersol from 1934 and in Fant from 1937.

== Personal life ==
Havrevold was first married in 1934 to actor Olafr Havrevold (1895–1972). They had two daughters and a son together. She remarried in 1962 to medical doctor Ragnvald Ingebrigtsen (1882–1975), who had previously been married to Gøril's sister Gerd.

Havrevold died in Oslo on 17 March 1992, at the age of 77.

== Selected filmography ==
- Sinners in Summertime (1934)
