= 1903 Norwegian parliamentary election =

General election in Norway

- 6 August−16 September 1903

All 117 seats in the Storting 59 seats needed for a majority

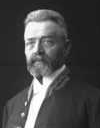

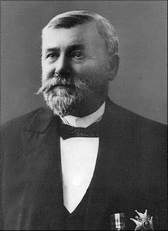

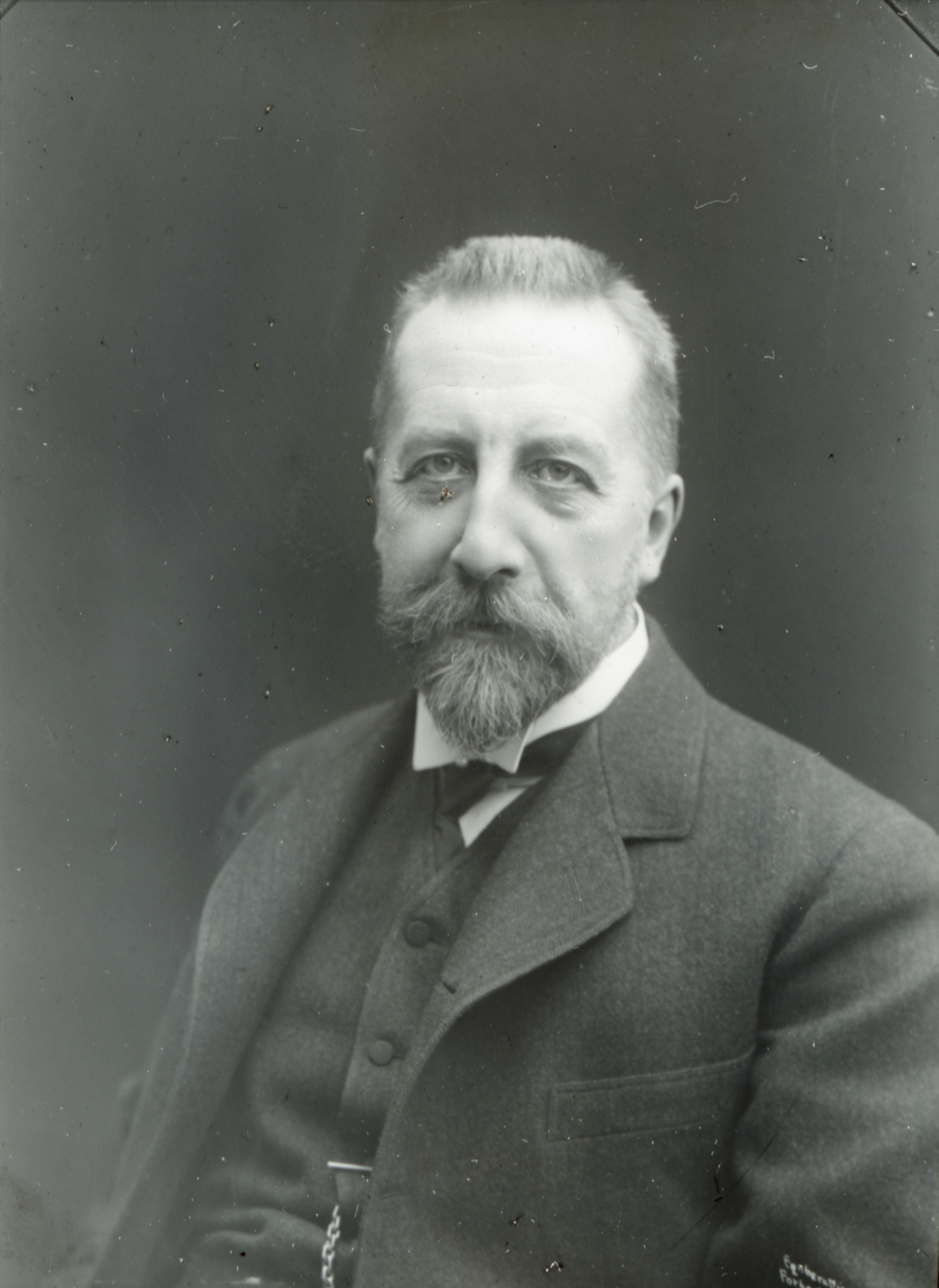

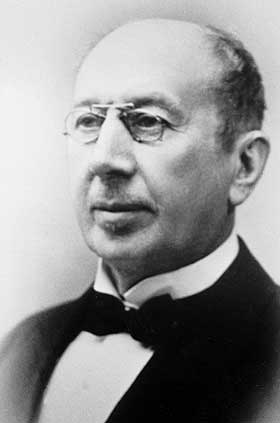

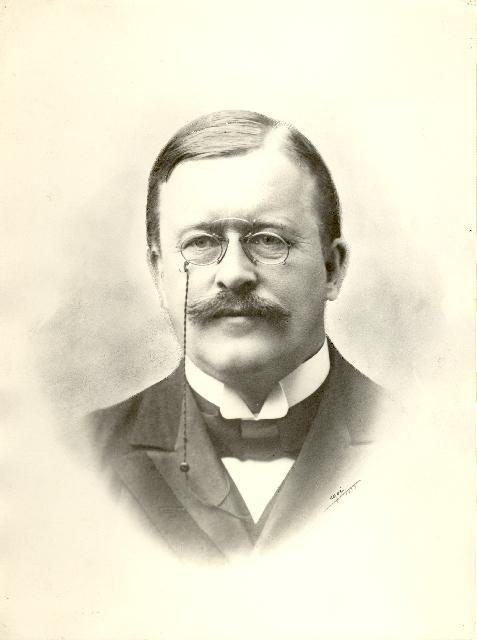
	First party	Second party	Third party
Leader	Carl Berner	Ole Larsen Skattebøl	Aasmund Halvorsen Vinje
Party	Liberal	Conservative	Moderate Liberal
Last election	54.01%, 77 seats	40.82%, 31 seats	6 seats with H
Seats won	48	47	10
Seat change	▼29	▲16	▲4
Popular vote	101,142 (V+Ad)	106,042 (H+MV+S)	Alliance with H
Percentage	42.74% (V+Ad)	44.81% (H+MV+S)	—
	Fourth party	Fifth party	Sixth party
Leader	Christian Michelsen	Christopher Hornsrud	Johan Castberg
Party	Coalition	Labour	Labour Democrats
Last election	–	2.98%, 0 seats	–
Seats won	5	5	2
Seat change	New	▲5	▲2
Popular vote	Alliance with H	22,948	Alliance with V
Percentage	—	9.70%	—
Prime Minister before election
Otto Blehr
Liberal
Prime Minister after election
Francis Hagerup
Coalition

Parliamentary elections were held in Norway between 6 August and 16 September 1903. The result was a victory for the Conservative Party-Moderate Liberal Party-Coalition Party alliance, which won 62 of the 117 seats in the Storting. It was the first time that the Labour Party gained seats. It was also the last election in Norway when Norway was in the union with Sweden that existed between 1814 and 1905.

== Results ==
Party	Votes	%	Seats	+/–
Conservative Party	106,042	44.81	47	+16
Moderate Liberal Party	106,042	44.81	10	+4
Coalition Party	106,042	44.81	5	New
Liberal Party	101,142	42.74	48	–29
Labour Democrats	101,142	42.74	2	+2
Labour Party	22,948	9.70	5	+5
Other parties	6,509	2.75	0	–
Total	236,641	100.00	117	+3
Valid votes	236,641	98.39		
Invalid/blank votes	3,862	1.61		
Total votes	240,503	100.00		
Registered voters/turnout	433,273	55.51		
Source: Nohlen & Stöver, NSD Polsys
