= List of Norwegian films of the 1970s =

Films produced in Norway in the 1970s:

== 1970s ==
Title	Director	Cast	Genre	Notes
1970
Antigone	Per Bronken		Drama	
Balladen om mestertyven Ole Høiland	Knut Andersen		Biopic, Drama, Comedy, Adventure	
Love Is War	Ragnar Lasse-Henriksen		Drama	Entered into the 21st Berlin International Film Festival
One Day in the Life of Ivan Denisovich	Caspar Wrede	Tom Courtenay, Espen Skjønberg	Drama	
1971
Marikens bryllup	Knut Andersen		Comedy	
Voldtekt	Anja Breien	Svein Sturla Hungnes	Drama	
1972
Lukket avdeling	Arnljot Berg		Drama	Entered into the 22nd Berlin International Film Festival
Norske byggeklosser	Pål Bang-Hansen	Rolv Wesenlund, Arve Opsahl	Comedy	
Olsenbanden tar gull	Knut Bohwim	Arve Opsahl	Comedy	3rd film in the Olsenbanden franchise
1973
Anton	Per Blom		Drama	
Lina's Wedding	Knud Leif Thomsen		Drama	Entered into the 8th Moscow International Film Festival
Olsenbanden og Dynamitt-Harry går amok !	Knut Bohwim		Comedy	
1974
Bobby's War	Arnljot Berg		Drama	Entered into the 24th Berlin International Film Festival
Edvard Munch	Peter Watkins		Biopic	Biopic of Edvard Munch
Olsenbanden møter Kongen & Knekten	Knut Bohwim		Comedy	
The Last Fleksnes	Bo Hermansson		Comedy	Entered into the 9th Moscow International Film Festival
1975
Flåklypa Grand Prix	Ivo Caprino	Wenche Myhre	Children's Film	
Olsenbandens siste bedrifter	Knut Andersen		Comedy	
Skraphandlerne	Bo Hermansson		Comedy	
1976
Angst	Oddvar Bull Tuhus		Thriller, Horror	
Den sommeren jeg fylte 15			Erotic Drama	
Vårnatt	Erik Solbakken	Espen Skjønberg, Astrid Folstad	Drama	
1977
Ante	Arvid Skauge, Nils Utsi		Drama, Children's Film	
Karjolsteinen	Knut Andersen	Erik Øksnes, Marit Grønhaug, Sverre Anker Ousdal	Drama	
1978
1979
Almegnag	Olav Kyrre Grepp			
Arven	Anja Breien		Drama	Entered into the 1979 Cannes Film Festival
Olsenbanden og Dynamitt-Harry mot nye høyder	Knut Bohwim	Arve Opsahl	Comedy	
