= Rolf Søder =

Norwegian actor

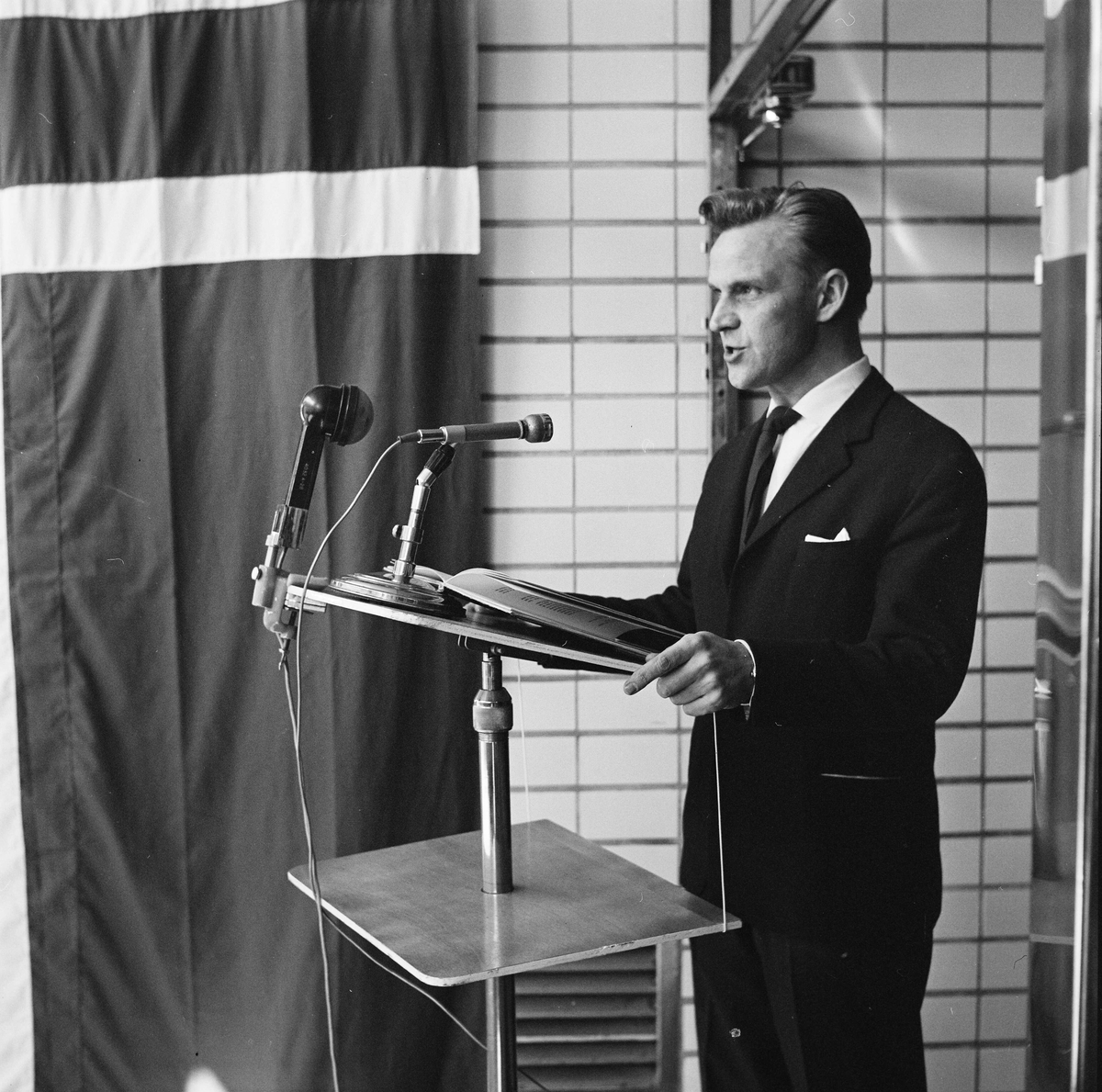
- Born: 4 July 1918; Kristiania, Norway
- Died: 23 August 1998 (aged 80); Oslo, Norway
- Occupation: Actor
- Years active: 1955-1991

Rolf Søder (4 July 1918 – 23 August 1998) was a Norwegian film actor. He appeared in 40 films between 1955 and 1991.

== Filmography ==
Year	Title	Role	Notes
1955	Blodveien	Soldat	
1956	Kvinnens plass	a man that saw a UFO	
1957	Nine Lives	Sigurd Eskeland	
1957	På slaget åtte	Kvinnebedrager	
1958	I slik en natt	Cab driver	
1958	Pastor Jarman kommer hjem	Makken	
1959	The Chasers	Bjørn	
1959	The Wayward Girl	Bendik	
1961	The Passionate Demons	Benna	
1961	I faresonen	Hansen the boatswain	
1961	Det store varpet		
1961	Hans Nielsen Hauge	En bonde	
1962	Tonny	Bonde	
1963	Elskere	Kropp	
1964	Marenco	Styrmann Rojansen	
1964	Klokker i måneskinn	Journalisten, 'Bridgepartiet'	
1964	Nydelige nelliker	Løytnant Sem	
1965	Vaktpostene	Haraldsen	
1966	Før frostnettene	Arne Ramstad	
1968	Hennes meget kongelige høyhet	Ferdinan, opposisjonsleder	
1969	Scorched Earth	Hekki Haldonen	
1973	Lina's Wedding	Eldre nabo med pipe	
1974	Den siste Fleksnes	Resepsjonist	
1974	The Island at the Top of the World	The Lawspeaker	
1975	Faneflukt	Flyktning	
1975	Olsenbandens siste bedrifter	Rockefeller Holm-Hansen jr.	
1975	Fru Inger til Østråt	Finn	
1977	Åpenbaringen	Makken	
1977	Karjolsteinen	Arnold	
1979	Blood of the Railroad Workers	Stål Røysing	
1980	Belønningen	Reidar	
1983	Hockeyfeber	Frank Hansen	
1987	På stigende kurs	Sjef på jobb	
1989	Sigurd Drakedreper	Forliksmann	
