= Erik Øksnes =

Norwegian actor (1930–1998)

- Born: November 14, 1930; Namsos, Norway
- Died: June 15, 1998 (aged 67); Oslo, Norway
- Occupation: Actor,
- Spouse: Julie Øksnes

Erik Øksnes (November 14, 1930 – June 15, 1998) was a Norwegian actor whose main work was on the stage.

Øksnes made his stage debut in 1954 as Amos in Arthur Miller's The Man Who Had All the Luck (Norwegian title: Mannen som hadde lykken med seg) at the National Traveling Theater. He was later employed at the Rogaland Theater from 1963 to 1966, the Trøndelag Theater from 1966 to 1969, and the Norwegian Theater from 1969 onward. On stage, he showed strength in modern realistic drama, among other things with the lead role in Eugene O'Neill's A Moon for the Misbegotten (Norwegian title: Måne for lifets stepbarn) at the Trøndelag Theater and in Arthur Miller roles as Biff in Death of a Salesman (Norwegian title: En handelsreisendes død) and Giles Corey in The Crucible (Norwegian title: Heksjakt) at the Norwegian Theater. Øksnes also distinguished himself in Nynorsk drama such as Arne Garborg's Læraren (The Teacher) and Den bortkomne faderen (The Lost Father), as well as Olav Duun's Medmenneske (Fellow Man) and Ettermæle (A Reputation Left Behind).

Øksnes mostly played supporting roles in films, but he had a central role in Karjolsteinen from 1977. On TV he could be seen, among other things, as Marve Fleksnes' travel companion in the Fleksnes Fataliteter episode "Seier'n er vår" (Victory is Spring) from 1976.

He married Julie Øksnes (née Andreassen) in 1959.

== Filmography ==
- 1968: Smuglere
- 1970: Dager fra 1000 år (in the section "Hvis du bærer på hjertesorg")
- 1970: Douglas as the police officer
- 1971: Rødblått paradis
- 1971: Voldtekt as Holen, an officer
- 1972: Motforestilling
- 1975: Faneflukt as Egil Støa
- 1975: Streik! as Olav Olsen
- 1976: Fleksnes Fataliteter (in the episode "Seier'n er vår") as a travel companion on the train (TV series)
- 1977: Karjolsteinen as Olav Klungland
- 1977: Kosmetikkrevolusjonen
- 1978: Operasjon Cobra as a police officer
- 1979: Olsenbanden og Dynamitt-Harry mot nye høyder as the garbage man
- 1981: Saken Ruth Vang as Knut Hagenberg (TV series)
- 1983: Spyship as Jakobsen (TV series)
- 1985: Alma as the unemployed friend (NRK Television Theater)
- 1985: Orion's Belt as Sørensen
- 1987: Over grensen as a farmer
- 1993: Secondløitnanten as Asbjørn
- 1995: Farlig farvann as Koblik
- 1995: Kjærlighetens kjøtere as the captain
- 1996: Hytta as Uncle Johansen (short)
- 1999: Absolutt blåmandag as Tormod
