= Roy Bjørnstad =

Norwegian actor

- Born: September 29, 1925; Oslo, Norway
- Died: November 28, 2005 (aged 80); Strømmen, Norway
- Occupation: Actor

Roy Bjørnstad (September 29, 1925 – November 25, 2005) was a Norwegian actor.

== Career ==
=== Stage ===
Bjørnstad made his debut in 1945 at the People's Theater in Sweden.

Throughout his career, he was associated with several theaters in Norway, including the Trøndelag Theater from 1949 to 1951, the Rogaland Theater from 1953 to 1960, and then several periods with NRK's Television Theater in the 1960s and 1970s.

From 1978 to 1996 he was engaged with the Norwegian Theater. He made a name for himself there in a number of Chekhov productions, such as Three Sisters (1981) and The Seagull (1987). He also made an impression in Cora Sandel's Kjøp ikke Dondi (Don't Buy Dondi) and Kido Okamoto's Heikegani (The Heike Crabs).

=== Film and television ===
In 1946, Bjørnstad made his film debut in Englandsfarere. Other films that he appeared in include Jentespranget, Trost i taklampa, Den siste Fleksnes, and Olsenbanden gir seg aldri. Bjørnstad also had some television roles outside of his Television Theater productions, including in a few episodes of the comedy series Fleksnes Fataliteter as well as in the crime series Nini (2001) and Blind gudinne (1997).

== Filmography ==
=== Films ===
- Englandsfarere (1946) as Arne
- Dei svarte hestane (1951) as Falte
- Trost i taklampa (1955) as Roy
- I faresonen (1961) as Bredesen, a sailor
- Freske fraspark (1963)
- Om Tilla (1963)
- Marenco (1964)
- Sult (1966) as Konstantin
- Bare et liv – Historien om Fridtjof Nansen (1968)
- An-Magritt (1969) as Lort-Nils, an ore transporter
- Operasjon V for vanvidd (1970) as Mørk
- One Day in the Life of Ivan Denisovich (1970)
- Lukket avdeling (1972) as Vestfold
- The Call of the Wild (1972) as Storeman
- Jentespranget (1973) as Gilbert
- Bobbys krig (1974) as Robert Lund
- Kimen (1974) as Jens
- Den siste Fleksnes (1974) as a policeman
- Karjolsteinen (1977) as the party chairman
- Operasjon Cobra (1978) as Fredrik's father
- Rallarblod (1979) as Slag-Peder
- Olsenbanden gir seg aldri (1981) as passport control officer
- Krypskyttere (1982) as Olaf Buer
- Buicken – store gutter gråter ikke (1991) as Arntzen

=== Television ===
- Kontorsjef Tangen (1966)
- Fleksnes Fataliteter: Trafikk og panikk (1974) as a policeman
- Fleksnes Fataliteter: Radioten (1976) as Bud
- Saken Ruth Vang (1981) as William Hagenberg
- I de beste familier (1994) as Jack
- Blind gudinne (1997) (mini-series) as Thomassen
- Nini (2001) as Will

=== NRK Television Theater ===
- Ungen (1960) as Julius
- Den store barnedåpen (1961) as Hans "Gjøken"
- Fru Inger til Østråt (1961) as Ejner Huk
- Går ut i kveld (1961) as Gidney
- Nederlaget (1966) as Louis
- Huset på grensen (1969) as a smuggler
- Twigs (1978) as Frank
