= Arne Lie (actor) =

Norwegian actor (1921–1982)

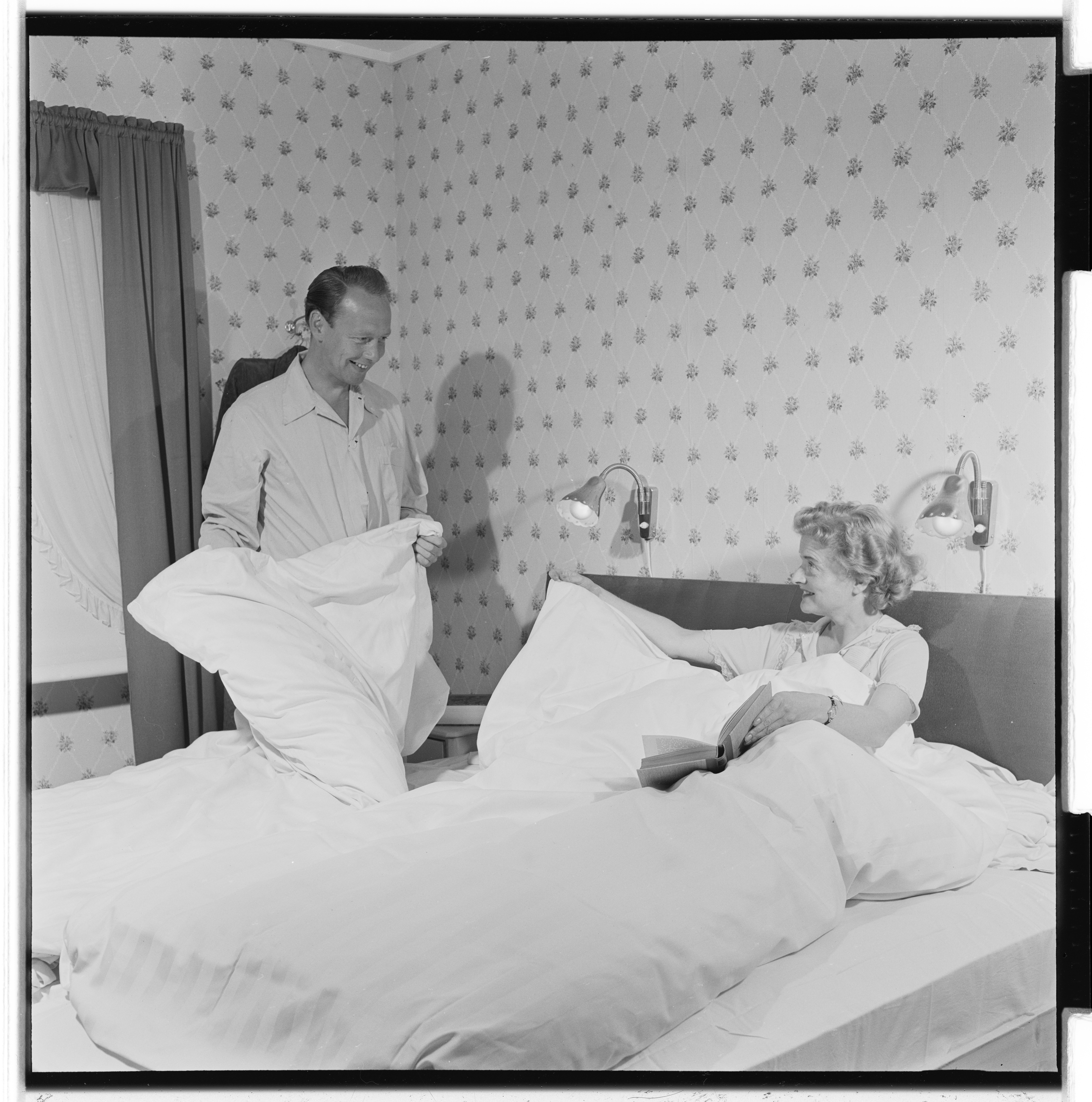
- Lie (left) in 1955
- Born: September 25, 1921; Kristiania (now Oslo)
- Died: January 22, 1982 (aged 60)
- Occupation: Actor
- Years active: 1947–1980

Arne Lie (September 25, 1921 – January 22, 1982) was a Norwegian actor best known for the voice of Paul Cox in the radio drama God aften, mitt navn er Cox (Good Evening, My Name is Cox), broadcast by the Norwegian Broadcasting Corporation's Radio Theater department, and for his role as Instructor Brandt in the Norwegian Stompa films and radio dramas, based on the Jennings novels.

== Career ==
Lie was born in Kristiania (now Oslo). He debuted in 1947 at the National Theater in Bergen, where he was engaged until 1952 and had a breakthrough as Biff in Arthur Miller's Death of a Salesman in 1950. He was later engaged at the People's Theater in Oslo from 1952 to 1955, the Norwegian Theater in Oslo from 1955 to 1960, the Norwegian Broadcasting Corporation's Television Theater from 1960 to 1964 and again from 1970 to 1972, the National Theater in Oslo, and the Oslo New Theater from 1972 to 1980. At the Norwegian Theater he played Prince Erik in August Strindberg's Gustavus Vasa and Erlend in the theater adaptation of Kristin Lavransdatter. One of his last theater roles was as Shylock in Shakespeare's The Merchant of Venice.

The films that Lie appeared in included Stompa & Co. (1962), Bobby's War (1974), and Min Marion (1975). He is especially remembered for his role as Instructor Brandt in three of the Stompa films, along with radio dramas in the same series.

Lie appeared in many productions by the Norwegian Broadcasting Corporation's Television Theater in the 1960s and 1970s, including in a few episodes of the comedy series Fleksnes. In the Television Theater he played, among other roles, the title role in Anton Chekhov's Uncle Vanya and the lead in Harold Pinter's The Collection. In the Fleksnes episode "Det går alltid et tog" (There's Always a Train, 1974) he played an authoritative major in a train compartment.

== Filmography ==
- 1980: Den som henger i en tråd (Olaus Strande)
- 1978: Olsenbanden og Data-Harry sprenger verdensbanken (concierge at the World Bank)
- 1977: Karjolsteinen (priest)
- 1976: Vårnatt (orderly)
- 1975: Min Marion (landlord)
- 1974: Under en steinhimmel (mayor)
- 1974: Kimen (Dal)
- 1974: Bobby's War (Fredrik)
- 1973: Lina's Wedding
- 1972: Marikens bryllup (Carsten)
- 1970: Døden i gatene (Mike)
- 1966: Før frostnettene (Knut Holmen)
- 1965: Stompa forelsker seg (Instructor Brandt)
- 1965: De kalte ham Skarven (Ole Jacob Moe)
- 1964: Marenco
- 1963: Stompa, selvfølgelig! (Instructor Brandt)
- 1962: Stompa & Co (Instructor Brandt)
- 1956: På solsiden (Hartvig Riibe, landowner)
- 1955: Blodveien (film), Serbo-Croatian title Krvavi put

=== TV appearances ===
- 1988: Fleksnes: "Her har jeg mitt liv" (officer on a train; in a clip recorded in 1974)
- 1974: Fleksnes: "Det går alltid et tog" (officer on a train)
- 1971: Smilet (Television Theater)
- 1971: Erasmus Montanus (Television Theater)
- 1970: Frakt under havet (Television Theater)
- 1963: Kranes konditori (Justus Gjør; Television Theater)
- 1962: Gengangere (Snekker Engstrand; Television Theater)
- 1961: Den evige ektemann (Alexei Ivanovich Vechaninov; Television Theater)
- 1961: Fru Inger til Østråt (TV; Finn; Television Theater)
- 1960: Den fjerde nattevakt (Sigismund; Television Theater)
- 1960: Miss Julie (Jean; Television Theater)
