= Ingeborg Cook =

Norwegian actress and singer (1915–2003)

- Born: May 13, 1915; Galveston, Texas
- Died: December 27, 2003 (aged 88)
- Occupations: Actress, singer

Ingeborg Cook (born Alma Ingeborg Cook, May 13, 1915 – December 27, 2003) was a Norwegian actress and singer.

Cook was born in Galveston, Texas, the daughter of Axel Brynjulf Christensen Cook (1886–1927) and Ingeborg Alma Cook (née Isaksen, 1888–1982). She left the United States for Norway when she was one year old. She married Victor Borg. Cook debuted as an actress in the film Tørres Snørtevold in 1940. She played a long series of roles both in film and on television. Her last role as an actress was in the sitcom Karl & Co in 1999 at the age of 84. Ingeborg Cook was the sister of the bass player and band leader Frank Cook.

== Filmography ==
- 1940: Tørres Snørtevold
- 1942: Jeg drepte!
- 1946: Englandsfarere
- 1947: Sankt Hans fest
- 1959: 5 loddrett
- 1960: Veien tilbake
- 1965: Hjelp – vi får leilighet!
- 1966: Før frostnettene
- 1969: The Olsen Gang (Norwegian: Operasjon Egon)
- 1970: Døden i gatene
- 1972: Norske byggeklosser
- 1972: Olsenbanden tar gull
- 1979: Lucie
- 1979: To Norway, Home of Giants
- 1992: Ute av drift!
- 1996: Markus og Diana
- 1998: Karl & Co
- 1999: Karl & Co
