= The Man Who Could Not Laugh =

- Directed by: Bo Hermansson
- Written by: Many
- Produced by: Egil Monn-Iversen
- Starring: Rolv Wesenlund; Birgitta Andersson; Harald Heide-Steen jr. Thea Stabell; Wenche Myhre; Martin Ljung,
- Cinematography: Odd Geir Sæther; Jan Alnæs
- Music by: Egil Monn-Iversen
- Production company: EMI-Produksjon A/S
- Release date: 1968
- Running time: 92
- Country: Norway
- Language: Norwegian

The Man Who Could Not Laugh (Norwegian: Mannen som ikke kunne le) is a 1968 Norwegian comedy film. The title role is played by Rolv Wesenlund. Harald Heide-Steen Jr. plays the psychologist with the task of teaching him to laugh. The film also stars the film's director, Bo Hermansson.

The film is considered a Norwegian classic and showcases a famous comedic duo in Wesenlund and Heide-Steen.

== Cast ==
- Rolv Wesenlund ... Mr. Sonell, the man who can't laugh
- Birgitta Andersson ... Stina, his Swedish girlfriend
- Harald Heide-Steen Jr. ... The psychiatrist
- Thea Stabell ... The nurse
- Wenche Myhre ... The singer
- Martin Ljung ... Himself
- Sverre Wilberg ... Mandrake
- Arve Opsahl ... Himself
- Alf Prøysen ... Audience in the barn
- Bjørn Sand ... The comedian
- Bengt Calmeyer ... The interviewer
- Stein Mehren ... Himself
- Per Øivind Heradstveit ... TV interviewer
- Svein Wickstrøm
