= Hilt (disambiguation) =

Hilt may refer to one of the following:

- Hilt, a detail of a sword.
- Hilt (band), one of several side projects of the seminal Vancouver industrial band Skinny Puppy
- Hilt, California, an unincorporated community in Siskiyou County
- Hilt Cirque, the west-most cirque of The Fortress in the Cruzen Range of Victoria Land
- Peter Hilt, a former New Zealand politician
- Hilt (surname), a list of people

== See also ==
- HILT CRC, a collaborative research centre in Adelaide, South Australia
