= Hilt (surname) =

Hilt is a surname. Notable people with the surname include:

- Christian Hilt (1888–1958), Norwegian news paper editor
- Odd Hilt (1915–1986), Norwegian sculptor
- Peter Hilt (1942–2025), New Zealand politician
- Ragnhild Hilt (1945–2014), Norwegian actress
