= Rødblått paradis =

1971 film

- Directed by: Oddvar Bull Tuhus
- Written by: Oddvar Bull Tuhus; Per Blom
- Starring: Svein Sturla Hungnes; Ragnhild Hilt; Pål Løkkeberg; Bente Børsum
- Cinematography: Erling Thurmann-Andersen
- Edited by: Espen Thorstenson
- Music by: Arild Boman
- Distributed by: Norsk Film A/S
- Release date: October 13, 1971
- Running time: 80 minutes
- Country: Norway
- Language: Norwegian

Rødblått paradis (Red Blue Paradise) is a Norwegian drama film from 1971 directed by Oddvar Bull Tuhus. The film was Tuhus's debut as a director. Svein Sturla Hungnes stars in the lead role. The film is about a young and newly graduated idealist who rebels against the authorities in the military and his work life.

== Cast ==
- Svein Sturla Hungnes as Per
- Ragnhild Hilt as Kristin
- Bela Csepcsanyi as Bela
- Bente Børsum as Mrs. Jervell
- Lars Andreas Larssen as Fenriken
- Pål Løkkeberg as the social work director
- Georg Richter as Hermansen
- Hans Stormoen as Hansen
- Bjørg Tvede Billing
- Bente Cappelen
- Bonne Gauguin
- Per Gran
- Jens Gunderssen (singing voice)
- Sven Jacobsen
- Willy Johansen
- Egil Lorck
- Finn Mehlum
- Ane Nordheim
- Grete Nordrå
- Erik Øksnes
- Anna E. Samuelsen
- Pål Skjønberg
- Bjørn Sørlie
- Arne Stang
