= Psychedelica Blues =

- Directed by: Nils Reinhardt Christensen
- Written by: Nils Reinhardt Christensen
- Based on: Karin Bang's novel Blues (1968)
- Produced by: Bente Erichsen
- Starring: Kjersti Døvigen; Finn Kvalem; Ståle Bjørnhaug; Ditlef Eckhoff
- Cinematography: Gunnar Syvertsen
- Edited by: Edith Toreg
- Music by: Ralph Lundsten; Kjell Karlsen
- Distributed by: Norenafilm
- Release date: October 16, 1969
- Running time: 84 minutes
- Country: Norway
- Language: Norwegian

Psychedelica Blues is a Norwegian youth drama film from 1969 directed by Nils Reinhardt Christensen. Along with Øyvind Vennerød's Himmel og helvete, it was the first Norwegian film that dealt with adolescents' use of narcotics, and it was the first Norwegian film to clearly depict the use of LSD. Because it was released after Vennerød's film, it received far less attention.

== Plot ==
The story deals with four days in Lissy's life in which she finds an outlet for a rebellious urge that has built up over several years. Lissy comes from a sheltered home with a conventional father who is a municipal politician. In the new environment she slips into the circle around the jazz group The Blue Bells, where she meets Lillegutt (Little Boy). He is a key member of the gang and supplier of drugs. Lillegutt is a cynical and intelligent judge of character, who has turned his back on a society of hypocrites. Through him, Lissy opens her eyes to the dividing lines between what is accepted and what is real.

== Background ==
Christensen had previously seen success with the film Line in 1961 and with his Stompa films (1962–1967). He chose to base his last film on Karin Bang's 1968 novel Blues. In contrast to Himmel og helvete, Christensen chose a more experimentalist style and a less moralizing story, always portraying Lissy's own perspective.

== Reception ==
The film received mixed reviews. Finn Syversen wrote in Aftenposten that "Christensen has wisely refrained from using the notion of drug abuse as a polemic topic. The debate on this phenomenon, which is relatively little explored by medical and sociological experts, has thus not been allowed to influence his intentions in any provocative, trend-setting way. ... We fully believe in Kjersti Døvigen's Lissy, who gives the role a character that reveals that she has a certain intuition for symptoms of loneliness in the cynical pessimism that plagues so many of today's young people. ... Repetitions of motifs were probably not avoidable in such a film, but they do not weaken the impression to any great extent. Psychedelia Blues is a highly worthwhile experiment."

== Cast ==
- Kjersti Døvigen as Lissy
- Finn Kvalem as Lillegutt
- Ståle Bjørnhaug as Leif
- Ditlef Eckhoff as Wilhelm
- Thomas Fasting as Jan
- Truls Dramar as Joppe
- Knut M. Hansson as Ragnar Borg
- Vibeke Falk as Molle Borg
- Kjell Frantzen as Brun, a university lecturer
- Svein Sturla Hungnes
- Helge Hurum as a band member
- Per Jansen as Eigil
- Randi Nordby as Mrs. Korsmo
- Eva Opaker as an alternative
- Arve Opsahl as Hans Korsmo
- Anne Marie Ottersen as Liven
- Gloria Rose as La Bommie
- Espen Rud as a band member
- Kåre Tengs-Pedersen as a band member
