= Over grensen =

- Directed by: Bente Erichsen
- Written by: Bente Erichsen
- Based on: Sigurd Senje's novel Ekko fra Skriktjenn (1983)
- Produced by: Bente Erichsen
- Starring: Bjørn Sundquist; Sverre Anker Ousdal; Ingerid Vardund; Finn Kvalem; Inger Lise Rypdal; Øyvind Berven; Hans Ola Sørlie
- Cinematography: Rolv Håan; Kaare Storemy
- Edited by: Bjørn Breigutu
- Music by: Nissa Nyberget
- Distributed by: Syncron-film AS
- Release date: February 19, 1987
- Running time: 87 minutes
- Country: Norway
- Language: Norwegian

Over grensen (Over the Border) or Feldmann-saken (The Feldman Case) is a Norwegian drama film that premiered on February 19, 1987. Bjørn Sundquist won the Amanda Award for the best male lead for his performance in the film.

== Plot ==
The film deals with the Feldmann case from 1942. The couple Jacob and Rakel Feldmann try to flee to Sweden with the help of two Norwegian Milorg border guides.

== Cast ==
- Bjørn Sundquist as Arnfinn Madsen, a journalist
- Sverre Anker Ousdal as Mikkel Årnes, a police investigator
- Ingerid Vardund as Rakel Feldmann
- Finn Kvalem as Jacob Feldmann
- Inger Lise Rypdal as Molly
- Øyvin Berven as Harald Sagstuen
- Hans Ola Sørlie as a resistance member and witness
- Trond Brænne as Paul Plassen
- Sigve Bøe as Larsen
- Per Christensen as the defense attorney
- Jack Fjeldstad as the sheriff
- Odd Furøy as a police superintendent
- Jon Eivind Gullord as a Nasjonal Samling member
- Ella Hval as Mrs. Hansen
- Bjørn Jenseg as a shop manager
- Ola B. Johannessen as the prosecuting attorney
- Andreas Kolstad as Moll, a witness
- Arild Kristo as a security head
- Heikki Kulblik as a deputy
- Aril Martinsen as Swan, a journalist
- Ragnhild Michelsen as a boarding house operator
- Sven Nordin as Jensen, a witness
- Alf Nordvang as the public prosecutor
- John Nyutstumo as Bø, a witness
- Hans Jacob Sand as a border guard
- Vidar Sandem as Kåre Sagstuen
- Henrik Scheele as Theo Jerilowitz
- Nøste Schwab as the sheriff's wife
- Kjell Stormoen as the judge
- Terje Strømdahl as Ole Sagstuen
- Karl Sundby as Aron Jerilowitz
- Erik Øksnes as a farmer
