= Maryon Eilertsen =

Norwegian actress and theatre director

- Born: 9 January 1950; Svolvær, Norway
- Died: 24 January 2015 (aged 65); Tromsø
- Occupation: Actor

Maryon Eilertsen (9 January 1950 – 24 January 2015) was a Norwegian actress and theatre director.

She was born in Svolvær. She was educated at the Norwegian National Academy of Theatre, and was assigned with Hålogaland Teater for the most of her career, from 1977. From 1993 to 1995 she was theatre director at Haugesund Teater.

She participated in the films Bobby's War (1974), as "Sissel" in Erik Solbakken's 1976 film Vårnatt based on a book by Tarjei Vesaas, in Karjolsteinen (1977), Etterbyrden (1984), Brekk (2007), and in some episodes of the television drama series Himmelblå.
