= Feldmann case =

Criminal case in Norway

The Feldmann case (Norwegian: Feldmannsaken) was a controversial criminal case in Norway in which two border guides admitted to killing an elderly Jewish couple during their escape from the Holocaust in Norway, and stealing their money. A jury acquitted the two of culpability for the killing, accepting their explanation that the couple endangered not just the mission but the viability of the escape route to Sweden.

== Prelude ==
On October 22, 1942, a train on the Østfold Line bound for Halden included ten refugees bound for Sweden, of whom nine were Jewish. Also traveling were two border guides, Karsten Løvestad and Harry Pedersen, both of whom may have been wanted by the occupying authorities. Between Skjeberg and Døle stations (both are now closed for passenger traffic), Norwegian police came through the cars inspecting identification cards. Hermann Feldmann and Willy Schermann (two of the Jewish refugees) and Karsten Løvestad (one of the guides) were asked by Arne Hvam, a committed Norwegian Nazi policeman, to step outside. Accounts differ as to whether Hvam at that point had asked the conductor to notify the police in Halden that he had apprehended refugees.

However, Løvestad, who was carrying a forged passport, shot Hvam on the train. The three then jumped off the speeding train near Besseberg. Feldmann broke an arm in the fall, and Schermann sustained some gashes. The three tried for some time to evade capture, but were eventually caught in one of the largest police campaigns in the history of the war. Feldmann, Schermann and the other Jewish refugees were murdered in Auschwitz in August 1943; Karsten Løvestad was also shot in September 1943 after appearing before a tribunal without the benefit of a defense.

The Nazi authorities made propaganda out of this incident. Newspaper headlines made it out to be a cold-blooded murder of a faithful public servant at the hands of the Jews. Hvam's funeral was attended by the top echelon of both the German and Norwegian Nazi authorities. Well-plated editorials called for decisive action against Jews.

== Rakel and Jacob Feldmann ==
Hermann Feldmann's foster parents were Rakel and Jacob Feldmann. Unnerved by the publicity this incident had caused, they had decided to make their own break for the Swedish border. They showed up at the farm of the Løvestad family in Trøgstad on October 23, asking for refuge and help to find their way across the border. As the area was still subject to search and surveillance by police forces, the Løvestad family was under significant pressure and risk of discovery.

The couple stayed hidden in the area for a few days, until October 27 when two border guides—Peder Pedersen and Håkon Løvestad—offered to take them across the border. The couple borrowed clothing and footwear for a two-day hike. But when the company of four arrived at Skrikerudtjernet, the guides clubbed the Jewish couple to death, stole their money, and sank the bodies in the lake with weights.

Løvestad fled to Sweden wearing Feldmann's gold watch, and Pedersen returned to his home after this and resumed guiding refugees across the border, including several Jews.

== Trial and verdict ==
The Feldmanns' bodies eventually floated to the surface and were discovered, and investigations led to the prosecution of Peder Pedersen and Håkon Løvestad. The matter came to trial in 1947. Although the two accused did not deny that they had killed the couple and taken their money, they claimed they had no real choice in the matter: the Feldmanns were old, overweight, and incapable of the long walk to the border. They were bound to be discovered where they were, and their arrest and detention would bring down the underground railroad, endangering many more lives than theirs.

The two were acquitted of killing the couple but were convicted for embezzling their money, which amounted to NOK 12,000; and their possessions.

During the debate surrounding the verdict, Oskar Hasselknippe, the editor of Verdens Gang, a leading Norwegian newspaper, challenged Leo Eitinger's criticism of the verdict, pointing out that in war, difficult decisions sometimes have to be made. He implied that Eitinger would not understand this, asking Eitinger where he had been during the war. To which Eitinger replied: "In Auschwitz!"

== Coverage in other media ==
In 1987, Bente Erichsen directed a Norwegian movie with a fictionalized account of the case, called Over grensen or Feldmann saken, based on the work of dramatized non-fiction by Sigurd Senje titled Ekko fra Skriktjenn.
