= Bengt Calmeyer =

Bengt Calmeyer may refer to:

- Bengt Calmeyer (musician), musician with Turbonegro
- Bengt Calmeyer (journalist) (born 1932), Norwegian journalist and novelist
