= Kasserer Jensen =

- Directed by: Nils R. Müller
- Written by: Hans Christensen; Carlo M. Pedersen
- Produced by: Øyvind Vennerød
- Starring: Carsten Winger; Nanna Stenersen; Einar Sissener; Espen Skjønberg; Liv Wilse; Aud Schønemann; Harald Aimarsen; Rolf Christensen; Ulf Selmer; Arne Bang-Hansen; Jørn Ording; Marius Eriksen Jr. Øivind Johnssen
- Cinematography: Sverre Bergli
- Edited by: Olav Engebretsen
- Music by: Egil Monn-Iversen
- Distributed by: Kommunenes filmcentral
- Release date: October 28, 1954
- Running time: 77 minutes
- Country: Norway
- Language: Norwegian

Kasserer Jensen (Jensen the Cashier) is a Norwegian comedy film from 1954. It was directed by Nils R. Müller. The script was written by Hans Christensen and Carlo M. Pedersen.

== Plot ==
A confusing comedy results from mistaken identity between the cashier Theodor Jensen and an escaped criminal, Gerhardt Müller, both played by Carsten Winger. Nanna Stenersen plays the role of Mrs. Jensen.

== Reception ==
On Friday, October 29, 1954, the newspaper Verdens Gang praised the acting and direction, but it also wrote: "It is again the script that has failed. The writer did not have enough ideas to fill the film with content. The result is many stagnant scenes and many unnecessary repetitions. Therefore the viewer often loses interest along the way." Verdens Gang rated the film a 3 out of 6.

== Cast ==
- Carsten Winger as Theodor Jensen / Gerhardt Müller
- Nanna Stenersen as Mrs. Jensen
- Einar Sissener as Director Simonsen
- Espen Skjønberg as Svensen
- Liv Wilse as Miss Andersen
- Aud Schønemann as Miss Stjernholm
- Harald Aimarsen as Jensen's coworker
- Rolf Christensen as the prosecutor
- Ulf Selmer as the judge
- Arne Bang-Hansen as a ferryman
- Jørn Ording as an attorney
- Marius Eriksen Jr. as a journalist
- Øivind Johnssen as a guard
