= Elskere =

- Directed by: Nils R. Müller
- Written by: Terje Stigen (novel)
- Starring: Ingerid Vardund; George Fant; Wenche Myhre; Pål Skjønberg; Gisle Straume; Jan Voigt; Kjersti Døvigen; Aud Schønemann
- Release date: 1963
- Running time: 97 minutes
- Country: Norway
- Language: Norwegian

Elskere (English: Lovers) is a 1963 Norwegian drama film directed by Nils R. Müller, starring Ingerid Vardund and Wenche Myhre. Ludvina (Vardund) is considered a woman of loose morals in her small home town, and her only real friend is the orphaned girl Grethe (Myhre). When Ludvina becomes pregnant, she decides to raise the child without the help of a man.
