= Dager fra 1000 år =

- Directed by: Anja Breien; Egil Kolstø; Espen Thorstenson
- Written by: Anja Breien, Egil Kolstø, Espen Thorstenson
- Release date: 1970
- Running time: 107 minutes
- Country: Norway
- Language: Norwegian

Dager fra 1000 år (English: Days from 1000 years) is a 1970 Norwegian anthology film written and directed by Anja Breien, Egil Kolstø and Espen Thorstenson. These three young directors got a chance to each contribute to a segment of a featured film. The three episodes take place in the past, the present, and the future.
