= Finn Kvalem =

Norwegian actor

- Born: April 12, 1934; Seljord Municipality, Norway
- Died: February 26, 1990 (aged 55)
- Occupation: Actor

Finn Kvalem (April 12, 1934 – February 26, 1990) was a Norwegian actor, stage director, and translator.

Kvalem had his debut at the Norwegian Theater in 1955, where he was engaged from 1956 to 1969. After that, he was at the National Theater in Oslo from 1969 to 1975. and again in 1985. He performed for NRK's television Theater from 1975 to 1979 and was the director of the Telemark Theater from 1982 to 1984. Kvalem is best remembered for his interpretation of Vidkun Quisling in Stein Ørnhøi's 1988 documentary Et liv – en rettssak (A Life: A Court Case). He also appeared in several Norwegian films.

Kvalem was the head of the Norwegian Actors' Equity Association from 1974 to 1976.

== Filmography ==
- 1955: Barn av solen as Jan
- 1960: Venner as the mountain-climbing club's secretary
- 1962: Tonny as Rødtopp
- 1969: Psychedelica Blues as Lillegutt
- 1978: Gengangere as Pastor Manders (TV)
- 1979: Fruen fra havet as Doctor Wangel (TV)
- 1987: Over grensen as Jacob Feldmann
- 1988: Blücher as Leif Welder, Linda's father
- 1988: Et liv – en rettssak as Vidkun Quisling (TV)
- 1989: 1814 (TV)
