= Haugesund Teater =

Theatre in Haugesund, Norway

Coordinates: 59°24′51″N 5°15′55″E

Haugesund Teater is a theatre based in Haugesund, Norway and is regional theatre for Nord-Rogaland. The theatre was established in 1986.

Maryon Eilertsen served as theatre director from 1993 to 1995. Birgit Amalie Nilssen was theatre director from 2005 to 2014.
