= Carsten Winger =

Norwegian actor

- Born: 18 May 1907; Kristiania, Norway
- Died: 19 August 1992 (aged 85)
- Occupation: Actor

Carsten Winger (18 May 1907 – 19 August 1992) was a Norwegian actor.

He was born in Kristiania. Winger made his stage debut at Søilen Teater in 1932, and was later assigned with Chat Noir, Det Nye Teater, Oslo Nye Teater, Det Norske Teatret and Folketeatret. He participated in a number of films, including Fant (1937), Et spøkelse forelsker seg (1946), Gategutter (1949), Skadeskutt (1951), Kasserer Jensen (1954), three "Stompa" films (1962, 1963 and 1965) as "rector Ulrichsen", Alle tiders kupp (1964), Pappa tar gull (1964), Før frostnettene (1966) and Lukket avdeling (1972). He played in several television films and series, including Den fjerde nattevakt (1960), Den uskyldige (1962), Skilsmissefeber (1967), Taxi (1969), Unnskyld hvis jeg forstyrrer (1975) and Farlig yrke (1976).
