= Ola Calmeyer =

Norwegian pianist (1930–2003)

Ola Mathias Calmeyer (14 April 1930 - 5 June 2003) was a Norwegian jazz pianist. He was the brother of the actor Joachim Calmeyer and the author Bengt Calmeyer, and known from a number of collaborations and album releases.

== Biography ==
Calmeyer was born in Oslo. After growing up in Horten, he became part of the city's jazz scene (1949–53). He was in the U.S. (1953–63), and performed in Vestfold (1963–75), where he established Urijazz in Tønsberg among other things. After moving to Oslo and becoming a central part of the jazz scene there (1975–1990) he performed with the house orchestra at Club 7, Winds Hot & Cool, as well as bands led by Brinck Johnsen, Alf Kjellman Ditlef Eckhoff, Paul Weeden, Odd Riisnæs, and Carl Magnus Neumann.

There after he established his own label Jazzland in partnership with the jazz bassist Arne Styhr, whereupon he gave him out plate with his own band "Mallorcatrio" with Ole Jacob Hansen on drums and Terje Venaas/Kai Hartvigsen on upright bass, with contributions from his brother Joachim Calmeyer, Ditlef Eckhoff, and Bjørn Johansen. He also released the album Rainbow sessions with Bjarne Nerem, Kristian Bergheim and Eyvind Olsen. More recently, he led a new version of the orchestra "Havna Swingers 95" (which he established in 1948-49) releasing an album, and collaborated with the poet Triztán Vindtorn. In a quartet with Jørn Winnæss, Halvard Kausland, and Kristen Svendsen released on two albums (1997, 2000).

== Discography ==
=== Solo albums ===
- Jazzpoem (1990)
- Jazz i blått spindelvev (1997) with Alexander Grieg, Geir Åge Johnsen and Jørn Winnæss
- Fingersongs (1999) with Jørn Winnæss
- Oleo! (2006)
- Our Buddy (2010)

=== Other contributions ===
- Winds Hot & Cool: Nostalgia Up to Date (1984)
- Kristian Bergheim/Bjarne Nerem: Rainbow sessions (1990)
- Monica Borgen: Choice (1998)
- Carl Magnus Neumann: Live at Kongsberg and Other Unreleased Works (2008)
