= Dagny Juel =

Norwegian model (1867–1901)

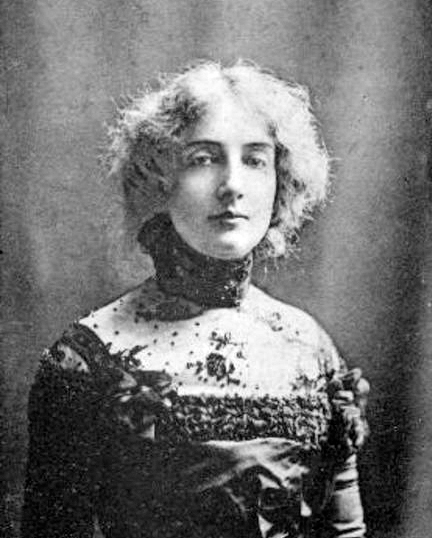
- Born: 8 June 1867; Kongsvinger Municipality
- Died: 5 June 1901; Tbilisi
- Occupation: Writer
- Spouse: Stanisław Przybyszewski
- Children: Zenon P. Westrup

Dagny Juel-Przybyszewska (Polish pronunciation: [ˈdagnɨ ˈjuɛl pʂɨbɨˈʂɛfska]; 8 June 1867 – 5 June 1901) was a Norwegian writer and artist's model, famous for her liaisons with various prominent artists, and for the dramatic circumstances of her death. She was the model for some of Edvard Munch's paintings. She had relationships with Munch and briefly with Swedish playwright and painter August Strindberg. In 1893, she married the Polish writer Stanisław Przybyszewski. Together they had two children. She was shot dead in a hotel room in Tbilisi, Georgia in 1901.

== Family background ==
Dagny was born in Kongsvinger, Norway, the second of four daughters of Doctor Hans Lemmich Juell and his wife Mindy (née Blehr). As a young woman Dagny changed the spelling of her name from 'Juell' to 'Juel'. The oldest sister, Gudrun, was beautiful and self-confident; Dagny was second born; third-born was a son, Hans Lemmich, who only lived one year; then came Astrid who was something of an invalid, who remained unmarried and stayed with her mother; and finally there was Ragnhild, who was closest to Dagny, and in time became a well-known opera singer.

== Early education ==
Dagny's early education was taken in hand by Anna Stang, who had established a private school for girls in Kongsvinger. Stang was one of the first advocates for women's rights in Norway, and was an active force in early Feminism. Dagny started studies in 1875, and six years later completed exams for entry into middle school. For several years she studied subjects such as Nature, History, Geography, Mathematics, English, German, and Norwegian language. Her results show that she was a diligent student.

== Erfurt and Oslo ==
On 3 November 1882, two days after her confirmation, she left for Europe, to study music in Erfurt. In January 1890 Dagny and her sister Ragnhild moved to Oslo (then named Christiania) to continue their studies. There Dagny became involved with the bohemian life of the city. She had a brief relationship with writer Hjalmar Christensen in February and March. It was probably in Christiania that she started a close relationship with the painter Edvard Munch.

== Berlin ==
Dagny chose to continue her studies in Berlin, possibly for the reason that she could be with Munch, who had travelled there in the autumn of 1892, after the Union of Berlin Artists had invited him to stage a November exhibition of his work. The scandal that resulted from the exhibition made Munch a notable figure in Berlin, and he decided to stay there.

Dagny first attended the Berlin bar Zum schwarzen Ferkel on 8 March 1893. It was there she met August Strindberg. Strindberg and his friends gave her the nickname 'Aspasia'. She had a brief relationship (about 3 weeks) with Strindberg. Adolf Paul was also taken with her beauty. She modelled for various Scandinavian artists, and was Munch's muse for a period. She is almost certainly the model for Munch's painting Jealousy.

== Marriage ==
Juel and Przybyszewski

Przybyszewski left his common-law wife Martha Foerder and their two children (born in February and November 1892), and married Dagny on 18 August 1893. Przybyszewski and Dagny had two children, and while married to Dagny, he fathered another child (born 6 February 1895) with Martha. Martha was found dead in her home on 9 June 1896, and Przybyszewski was arrested on suspicion of her murder, but after spending two weeks in prison, he was released when it was determined that she had died of poisoning by carbon monoxide, and that it was almost certainly suicide. Some surviving fragments of Dagny's writing show her returning to the theme of two lovers causing the death of a third.

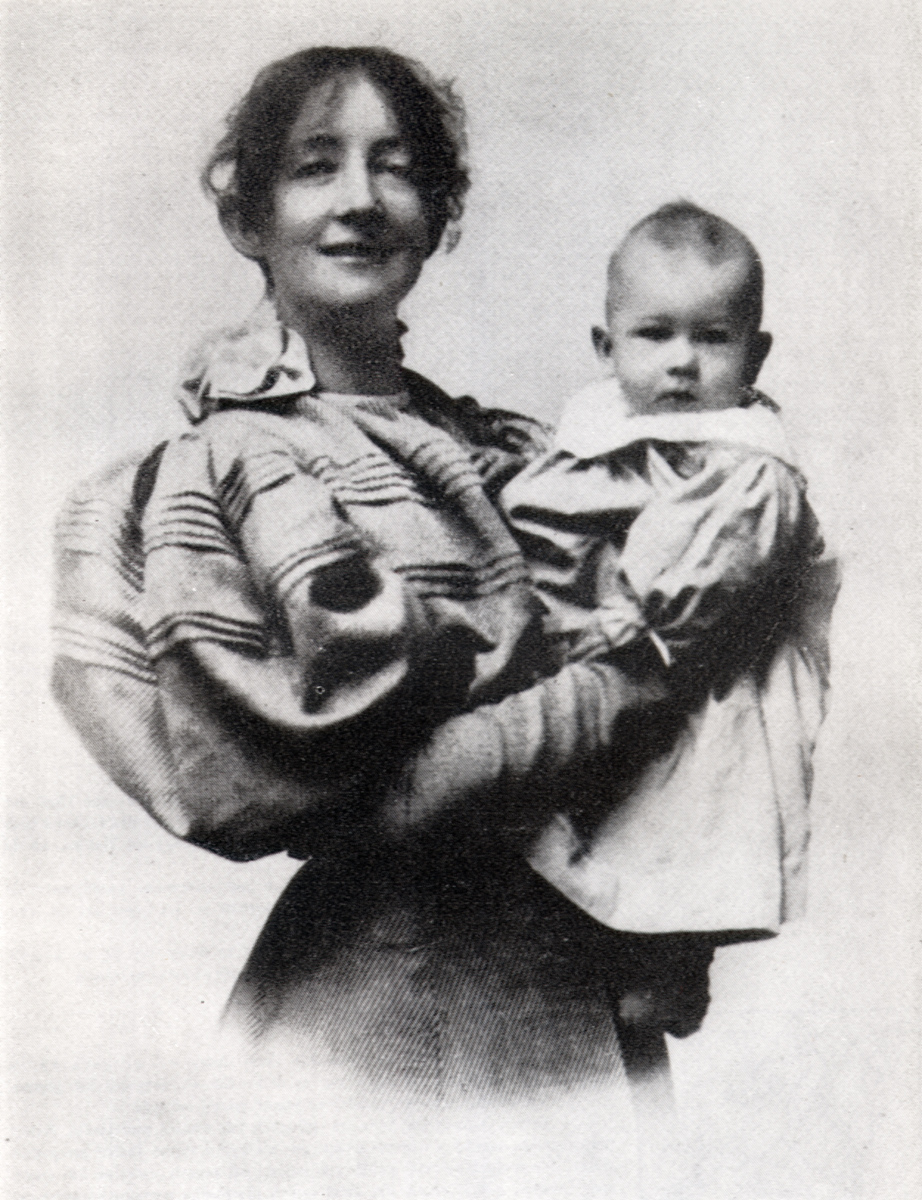
Dagny Juel with her son Zenon

Dagny refused to raise Martha's three motherless children. In fact, Dagny, though a loving mother, was in the habit of leaving her own two children (Zenon born 28 September 1895, and Ivi [Iwa] born 2 or 5 October 1897, probably by cesarian section) with her parents in Kongsvinger for periods of time. The decadent and financially precarious life with the increasingly alcohol-dependent Przybyszewski in Berlin was far from a suitable environment to raise children.

== Abandonment and death ==
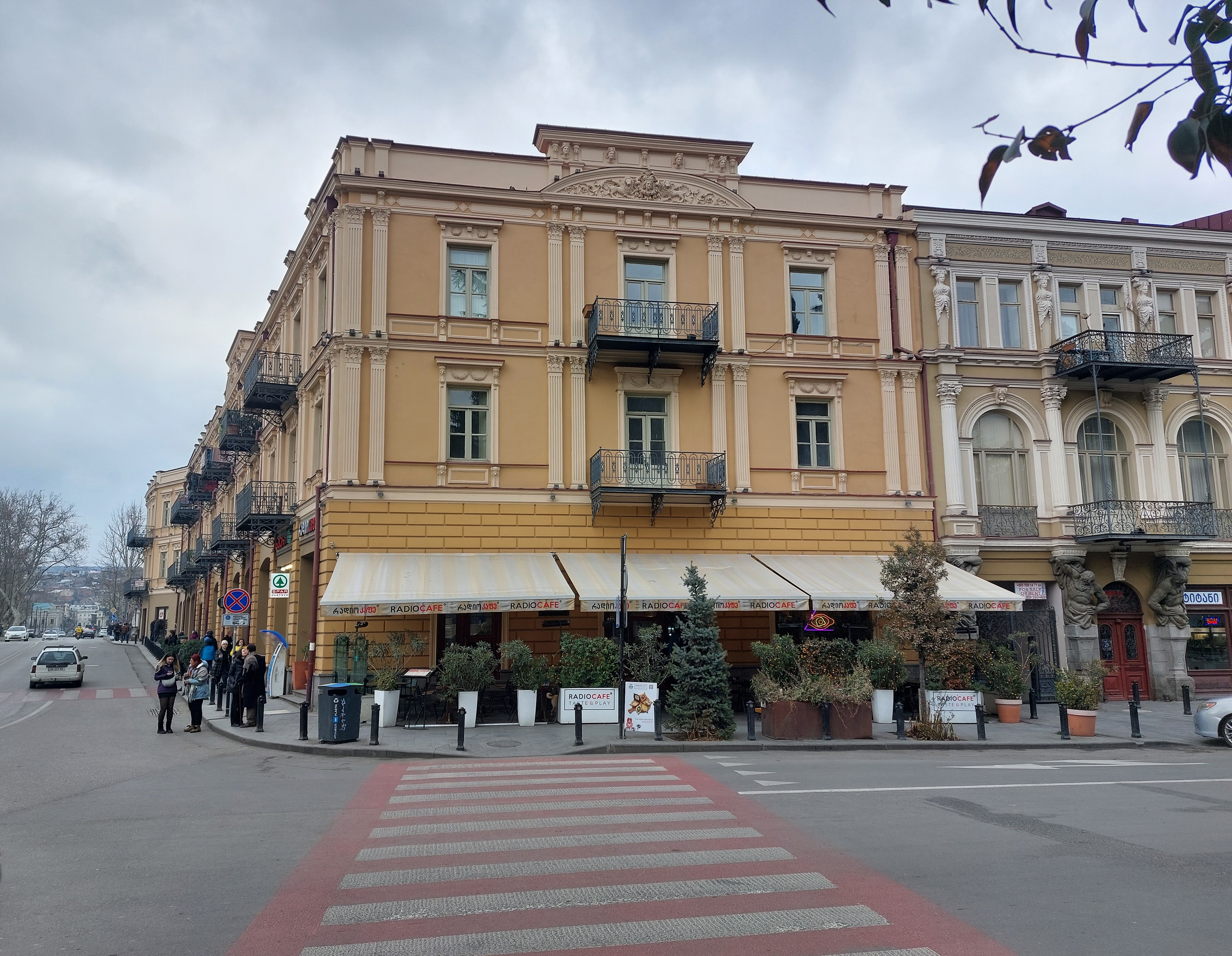
The former Grand Hotel building in Tbilisi (left corner) where Juel was murdered.

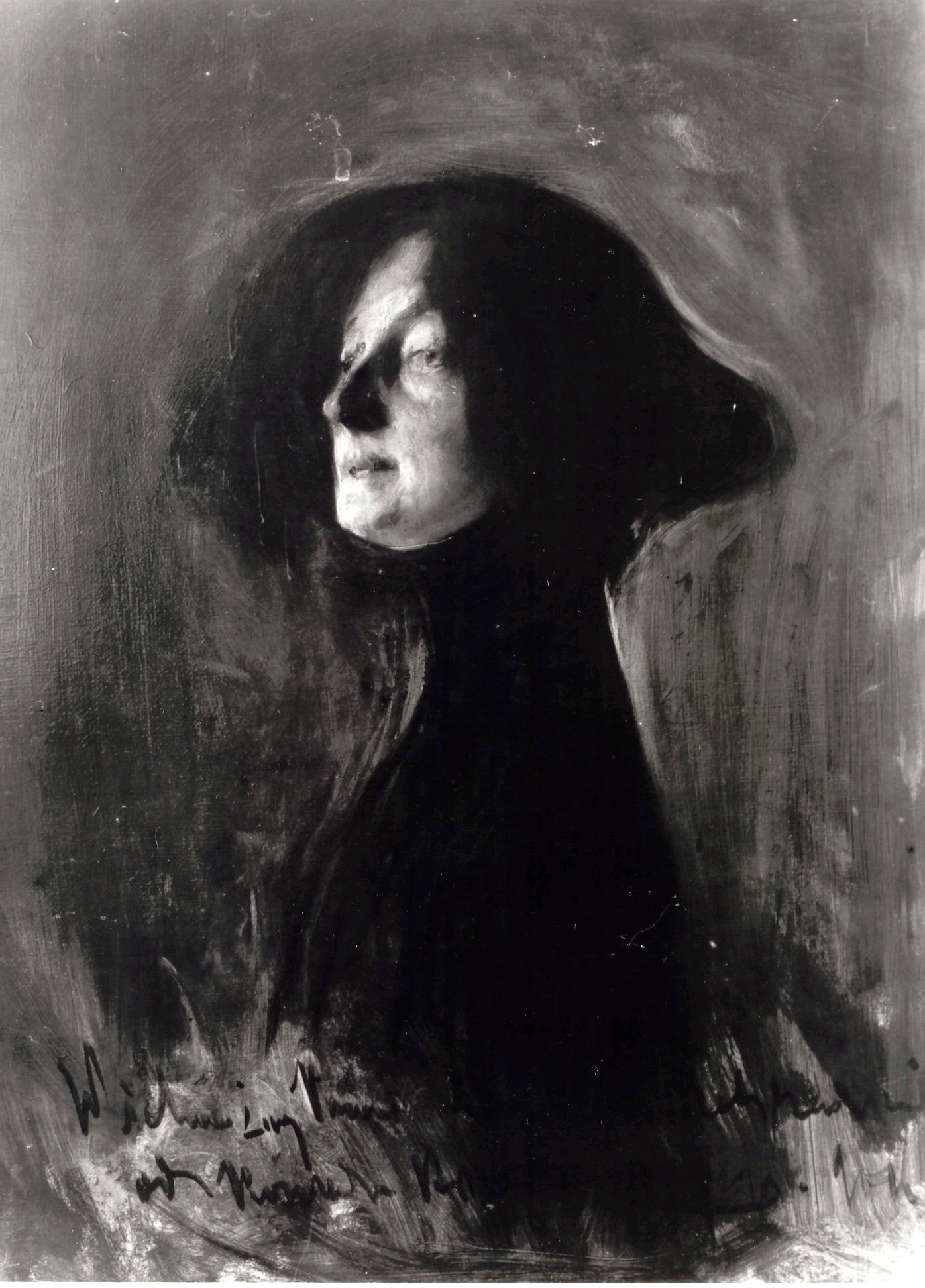
Portrait of Dagny Juel Przybyszewska by Konrad Krzyżanowski

Dagny accompanied Przybyszewski to Kraków where he became a key figure in the Young Poland movement, and editor of the journal Życie. While travelling in Galicia, Przybyszewski became involved with the wife of his friend Jan Kasprowicz, and abandoned Dagny for her.

Stanisław Przybyszewski may have encouraged Dagny's relationships with Henryk Sienkiewicz (who arranged a grant of 3200 Austrian Kronen from the Polish Academy of Talent for Przybyszewski) and with Władysław Emeryk, the son of a mine-owner.

There is some evidence that Przybyszewski and Emeryk may have plotted her murder. At the time of Dagny's death, Przybyszewski was involved with two other women in Poland — Jadwiga Kasprowiczowa and Aniela Pająkówna, one of whose two daughters was Przybyszewski's, while Dagny had romantic relationships with at least three men in Paris, including Emeryk. Emeryk invited Przybyszewski and Dagny on a trip to visit his family in the Caucasus; at the last minute Przybyszewski backed out, saying he would join them later.

On 5 June 1901, in a room of the small 'Grand Hotel' in the Georgian capital city of Tiflis (now Tbilisi), Emeryk shot Juel in the head; the next day he attempted to shoot himself. Juel's 5-year-old son, Zenon, witnessed the murder of his mother. She was buried at a Roman Catholic church in Tiflis and reburied, in 1999, into a churchyard at the Kukia cemetery.

== Works ==
- Short story 'Rediviva' (1893, published posthumously in 1977).
- Drama Den sterkere (The Stronger) submitted to the Christiania Theater, 1895; accepted for publication in the periodical Samtiden 1896.

== In books and film ==
In 1977 there was a Polish/Norwegian film based on Dagny Juel's life, called Dagny.

Her son Zenon P. Westrup (who became a diplomat, and who took the last name of his adoptive family) appears along with his daughter Ann, in Ingeranna Krohn-Nydal's 2005 Norwegian documentary film — Død Madonna (Dead Madonna: Dagny Juel Przybyszewska).

Dagny Juel's death was a subject of a short novel, Stanisław Przybyszewski, by a prominent Russian writer, Yury Nagibin, and a Russian movie A Model loosely based on this novel.

A biography of Juel by Mary Kay Norseng was published in 1991, entitled Dagny: Dagny Juel Przybyszewska, the Woman and the Myth. It covers her life, written works, personal relationships, and her influence on and place in the local burgeoning bohemian scene in the late 1800s. Norseng traveled throughout Northern Europe, and conducted personal interviews with Dagny Juel's family, among others, in the process uncovering new poetry and details from her life not previously known.

Dagny or a Love Feast, a book by the Georgian writer Zurab Karumidze, was published in 2011.

Blixa Bargeld, singer of German industrial band, Einstürzende Neubauten wrote a song about her, "Grand Hotel Tbilisi".

== Sources ==
- Eivor Martinus, Strindberg and Love Amber Lane Press, 2001. ISBN 1-872868-33-9; pages 146 – 149.
