= Harald Aimarsen =

Norwegian actor

- Born: June 9, 1881; Kristiania (now Oslo), Norway
- Died: January 5, 1966 (aged 84); Oslo, Norway
- Occupation: Actor

Harald Aimarsen (June 9, 1881 – January 5, 1966) was a Norwegian actor.

Aimarsen was born in Kristiania (now Oslo), Norway. Among other venues, he worked at the Oslo New Theater. He acted in many films from 1919 until his death. Aimarsen died at Aker Hospital in 1966.

== Filmography ==
- 1919: Synnöve Solbakken
- 1934: Synnöve Solbakken (uncredited)
- 1938: Bør Børson Jr. as a hotel operator
- 1941: Den forsvundne pølsemaker as Brodersen
- 1943: Den nye lægen as the watchmaker
- 1946: Englandsfarere as Josef
- 1947: Sankt Hans fest
- 1949: Gategutter
- 1951: Kranes konditori (uncredited)
- 1952: Andrine og Kjell
- 1952: Trine!
- 1954: Kasserer Jensen as Jensen's coworker
- 1955: Det brenner i natt as an editorial staff member
- 1955: Trost i taklampa as Smikkstad
- 1955: Barn av solen
- 1956: Kvinnens plass as a newspaper employee
- 1957: På slaget åtte
- 1958: Bustenskjold as a customer at the bar
- 1959: Herren og hans tjenere
- 1960: Millionær for en aften
- 1961: I faresonen as the carpenter
- 1961: Bussen
- 1961: Hans Nielsen Hauge as a farmer
