= The Witch Hunt =

- Directed by: Anja Breien
- Written by: Anja Breien
- Starring: Lil Terselius
- Cinematography: Erling Thurmann-Andersen
- Music by: Arne Nordheim
- Release date: 1981
- Country: Norway
- Language: Norwegian

The Witch Hunt (Norwegian: Forfølgelsen) is a 1981 Norwegian drama film written and directed by Anja Breien.

The film was entered into the main competition at the 38th edition of the Venice Film Festival.

== Cast ==
- Lil Terselius as Eli Laupstad
- Bjørn Skagestad as Aslak Gimra
- Anita Björk as Ingeborg Eriksdotter Jaatun
- Erik Mørk as Henrik Ravn
- Ella Hval as Guri
- Mona Jacobsen as Maren
- Espen Skjønberg as Kristoffer Klomber
- Eilif Armand as Rasmus Knag
- Jan Hårstad as Njell Asserson
- Lars Andreas Larssen as Glaser
- Cay Kristiansen as Bolle
- Jens Okking as Blomme
- Jorunn Kjellsby as Dordi
- Häge Juve as Sigrid
- Lothar Lindtner as Asser
