= Bak sju hav =

1991 Norwegian drama film

- Directed by: Saeed Anjum; Espen Thorstenson
- Written by: Espen Thorstenson
- Starring: Sajid M. Hussain; Zafar Malik; Rubina J. Rana
- Release date: 1991
- Running time: 87 minutes
- Country: Norway
- Language: Norwegian

Bak sju hav (English: Behind seven oceans) is a 1991 Norwegian drama film directed by Saeed Anjum and Espen Thorstenson. Aslam (Sajid M. Hussain) is 8 years old when his father leaves their home in Lahore, Pakistan, for Norway. After one year, Aslam and the rest of the family follow.
