= Kjersti Døvigen =

Norwegian actress (1943–2021)

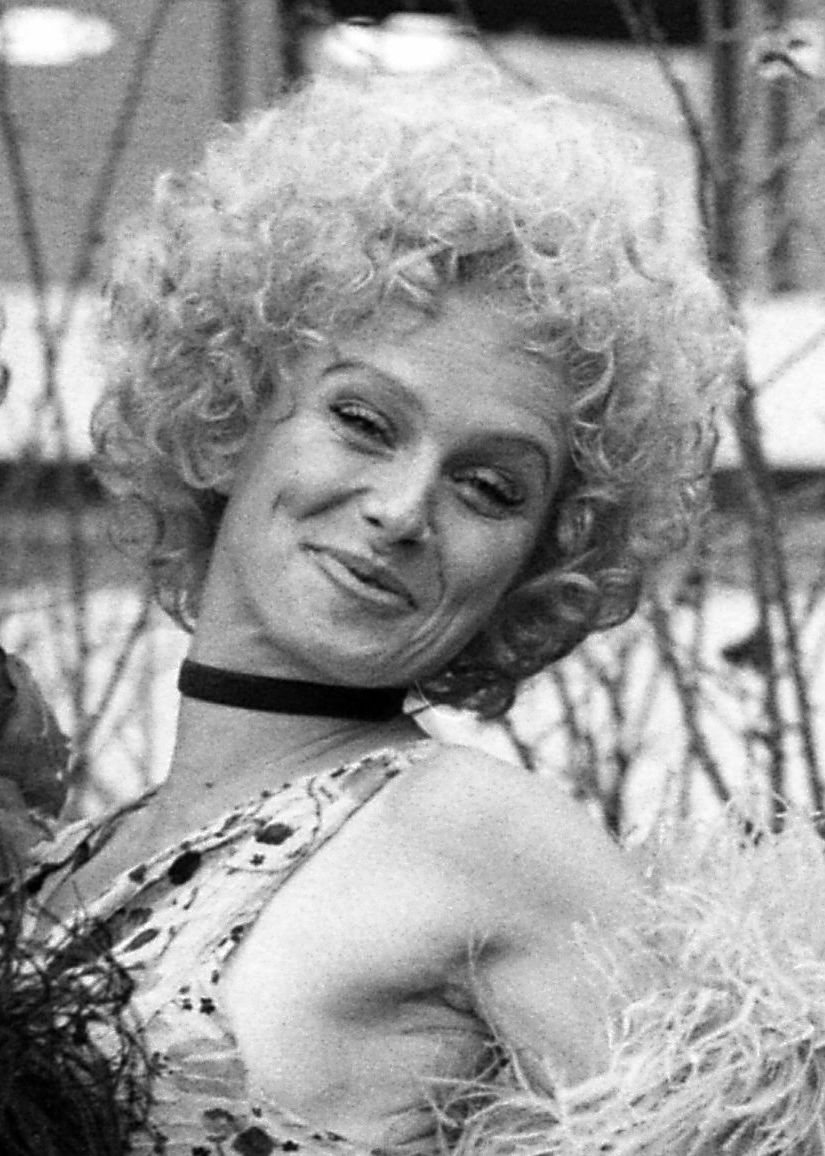

Kjersti Døvigen (27 June 1943 – 26 January 2021) was a Norwegian actress. She was known, among other things, for her role in the popular Norwegian TV-drama Offshore.

At the age of seven, Kjersti started dancing, her career began as a ballet dancer. She worked in this area at the Norwegian Opera for eight years before her breakthrough in 1967 in Claudine's role in CanCan.

Døvigen, the widow of financier Halvor Astrup, was the mother of the actress Ulrikke Hansen Døvigen and lived in Bath, England.

== Selected filmography ==
- 1963: Elskere as Guro
- 1969: Psychedelica Blues as Lissy
- 1970: Douglas as Kari
- 1974: The Last Fleksnes as Unni
- 1976: Lasse & Geir as Kjersti
- 1976: Bør Børson II as Ida Olsen
- 1980: Life and Death as Jennifer
