= Lukket avdeling =

1972 film

- Directed by: Arnljot Berg
- Produced by: Harald Ohrvik
- Starring: Roy Bjørnstad
- Cinematography: Knut Gløersen
- Music by: Freddy Lindquist
- Release date: 1972
- Running time: 92 minutes
- Country: Norway
- Language: Norwegian

Lukket avdeling is a 1972 Norwegian drama film directed by Arnljot Berg. It was entered into the 22nd Berlin International Film Festival.

== Cast ==
- Roy Bjørnstad - Vestfold
- Carsten Byhring - Vålerenga
- Vegard Hall - Gamlingen
- Erik Hivju - Harry
- Arne Lindtner Næss - Den tause
- Per Tofte - Playboy
- Carsten Winger - Hamlet
- Gard Øyen - Guttungen
- Eva von Hanno - Pleiersken
- Ole-Jørgen Nilsen - Paul Paulus
- Per Theodor Haugen - Overlegen
- Eilif Armand - Den tilknappede
- Willie Hoel - En pasientvenn
- Aud Schønemann - Kona til Vålerenga
- Freddy Lindquist - Musikeren
