= Blood of the Railroad Workers =

- Directed by: Erik Solbakken
- Written by: Erik Solbakken; Kristofer Uppdal
- Starring: Nils Ole Oftebro; Ragnhild Hilt
- Release date: 1979
- Running time: 123 minutes
- Country: Norway
- Language: Norwegian

Blood of the Railroad Workers (Norwegian: Rallarblod) is a 1979 Norwegian drama film directed by Erik Solbakken, starring Nils Ole Oftebro and Ragnhild Hilt. A group of rallare (migratory rail road workers) arrive in a small town in Norway, and cause social conflict. One of the men, Sjugur (Oftebro), stands apart as a strong, independent man. The girls like him, but he has set his sights on Innbranna (Hilt), the daughter of a wealthy landowner.
