= Før frostnettene =

- Directed by: Arnljot Berg
- Written by: Arnljot Berg
- Based on: Sigurd Hoel's novel Fjorten dager før frostnettene
- Produced by: Svein H. Toreg
- Starring: Arne Lie; Anne-Lise Tangstad; Inger Marie Andersen; Rolf Søder; Ingrid Valvik; Carsten Winger; Wilfred Breistrand; Carsten Byhring; Joachim Calmeyer; Ingeborg Cook; Ragnhild Hjorthoy; Astri Jacobsen; Sverre Wilberg
- Cinematography: Hans Nord
- Edited by: Arnljot Berg
- Music by: Egil Monn-Iversen
- Distributed by: Kommunenes Filmcentral
- Release date: 1966
- Running time: 94 minutes
- Country: Norway
- Language: Norwegian

Før frostnettene (English: Before the Frosts) is a 1966 Norwegian drama film directed by Arnljot Berg. It is based on Sigurd Hoel's 1935 novel Fjorten dager før frostnettene (Fourteen Days before the Frosts) and it premiered on January 17, 1966. The music for the film was composed by Egil Monn-Iversen.

== Plot ==
Knut Holmen is celebrating his 40th birthday and starts seeking to recapture his youth. He meets a young woman named Vera Boye. Holmen becomes involved in an intense romance with her in a few weeks in the fall. A friend lends him an apartment, which he makes free use of to be unfaithful to his wife.

== Cast ==
- Inger Marie Andersen: Agnete Holmen
- Arne Lie: Knut Holmen
- Anne-Lise Tangstad: Vera Boye
- Wilfred Breistrand: Jens Gunnerus
- Carsten Byhring: Holmen's friend
- Joachim Calmeyer: a doctor, Holmen's colleague
- Ingeborg Cook: Holmen's dinner guest
- Ragnhild Hiorthøy: apartment landlady
- Astri Jacobsen: Mrs. Gunnerus
- Rolf Søder: Arne Ramstad
- Ingrid Valvik: Helga
- Sverre Wilberg: waiter at the Continental
- Carsten Winger: Hagen
