= I faresonen =

- Directed by: Bjørn Breigutu
- Written by: Ragnar Kvam; Arild Brinchmann
- Starring: Rolf Søder; Harald Aimarsen; Roy Bjørnstad
- Cinematography: Tore Breda Thoresen
- Edited by: Bjørn Breigutu
- Music by: Finn Ludt
- Distributed by: ABC-Film A/S
- Release date: May 3, 1961
- Running time: 52 minutes
- Country: Norway
- Language: Norwegian

I faresonen (In the Danger Zone) is a Norwegian drama featurette from 1961 directed by Bjørn Breigutu. The screenplay was written by Ragnar Kvam and Arild Brinchmann. The film stars Rolf Søder, Harald Aimarsen, and Roy Bjørnstad.

The film was shown in Norwegian theaters in 1961, but hardly in Oslo. It was also screened at the 11th Berlin International Film Festival that same year.

== Plot ==
The film depicts a group of sailors on board and on land. An ex-alcoholic, the boatswain Hansen, talks about his experiences.

== Cast ==
- Rolf Søder as Hansen, the boatswain
- Ronald Abrahamsen as the oiler
- Harald Aimarsen as the carpenter
- Roy Bjørnstad as Bredesen, a sailor
- Erling Lindahl
- Erik Bye
- Fredrik Wildhagen
- Robert Normann Jr. as Kjell, the deck boy
- Jan Frydenlund as the narrator
