= Harald Ohrvik =

Norwegian film producer

Harald Ohrvik (10 April 1940 – 21 December 2012) was a Norwegian film producer.

Ohrvik, who hailed from Kristiansund, was a producer in the company Norsk Film until 1995. His filmography includes Voldtekt (1971), Bør Børson Jr. (1974), Reisen til julestjernen and Vårnatt (1976), Kosmetikkrevolusjonen (1977), Arven (1979), Lucie (1979), 1958 (1980), Nedtur (1980), Liten Ida (1981), En håndfull tid (1989), Døden på Oslo S (1990), The Last Lieutenant (1993) and Du Pappa (1994).
