= Lene Berg =

Norwegian film director and artist

- Born: 26 April 1965 (age 61); Oslo, Norway
- Occupations: Director, author, artist
- Years active: 1997–present
- Notable work: Kopfkino, Stalin by Picasso, False Belief, Fra Far (From Father)

Lene Berg (born 1965) is a Norwegian film director and artist, who works in Oslo and Berlin. Her artistic praxis includes film, installation, collage and text-based work. She has produced a number of projects in public spaces and directed four independently produced feature-length films. She represented Norway in the 55th Venice Biennale with the film Dirty Young Loose (2013). In 2022 she was invited to the prestigious Norwegian Festival Exhibition at the Bergen Kunsthall for which she produced the large-scale exhibition Fra Far. In 2023 her novel with the same title was published by Kolon Forlag. She is a member of the Norwegian Visual Artist Guilds NBK & UKS, the Directors Guild of Norway and The Writers Guild of Norway. She co-founded the distribution agency Filmbyrået Jack and the production company VIDEONOVA.

== Early life and education ==
Lene Berg was born in Oslo 1965, to sociologist Mie Berg Simonsen and film director Arnljot Berg. Growing up in Oslo, Berg attended the Oslo Waldorf School and Forsøksgymnaset in Oslo. She graduated in 1992 with a degree in film directing from Dramatiska Institutet in Stockholm (University College of Film, Radio, Television and Theatre in Stockholm). Her debut full-length feature En Kvinnas Huvud (1997) was produced by Hinden/Länna-Ateljéerna AB.

== Work ==
=== Media and style ===
Educated as a film director Berg integrates not only film, but also text and collage and installations in her work. In the late 1990s her work began to be shown in contemporary art venues. Berg's work is often characterized by a hybrid format, mixing genres, using different forms of media, narrative structures and artistic techniques, to investigate historical and political topics. A common theme in many of her projects is how a particular notion of truth is contingent, and how reality might be considered differently through the inclusion of additional stories, or an alternative perspective.

=== Notable projects ===
==== Encounter: Gentlemen & Arseholes ====
In the project Encounter: Gentlemen & Arseholes Berg reproduced the first edition of the literary magazine Encounter (magazine) from 1953, inserting her own notes and images between the pages of the magazine's original content. The additional materials were collected from books, newspapers, private albums and conversations, and were not available to the public at the time of the original publication. The inserts shed new light on the CIA’s engagement in the Cultural Cold War, as expressed through the original magazine. The story of individuals engaged in the magazine is further expanded upon in the film The Man in the Background.

==== The Man in the Background ====
In the film The Man in the Background Berg investigates the fate and role of Michael Josselson, director of the Congress for Cultural Freedom, in the Cold War era. The video material consists of Josselson's private super-8 footage from a vacation in 1958 and interviews with his widow Diana, shot nearly 50 years later. In 1966, the New York Times revealed that the Congress for Cultural Freedom had received funding from the CIA, and thus it was exposed that the Josselsons had lied to everyone around them for nearly two decades. The revelation changed the life of the Josselsons radically and painfully. Furthermore, the film poses questions about the other contributors to the magazine, their complicity and the scapegoating of the Josselsons.

==== Stalin by Picasso ====
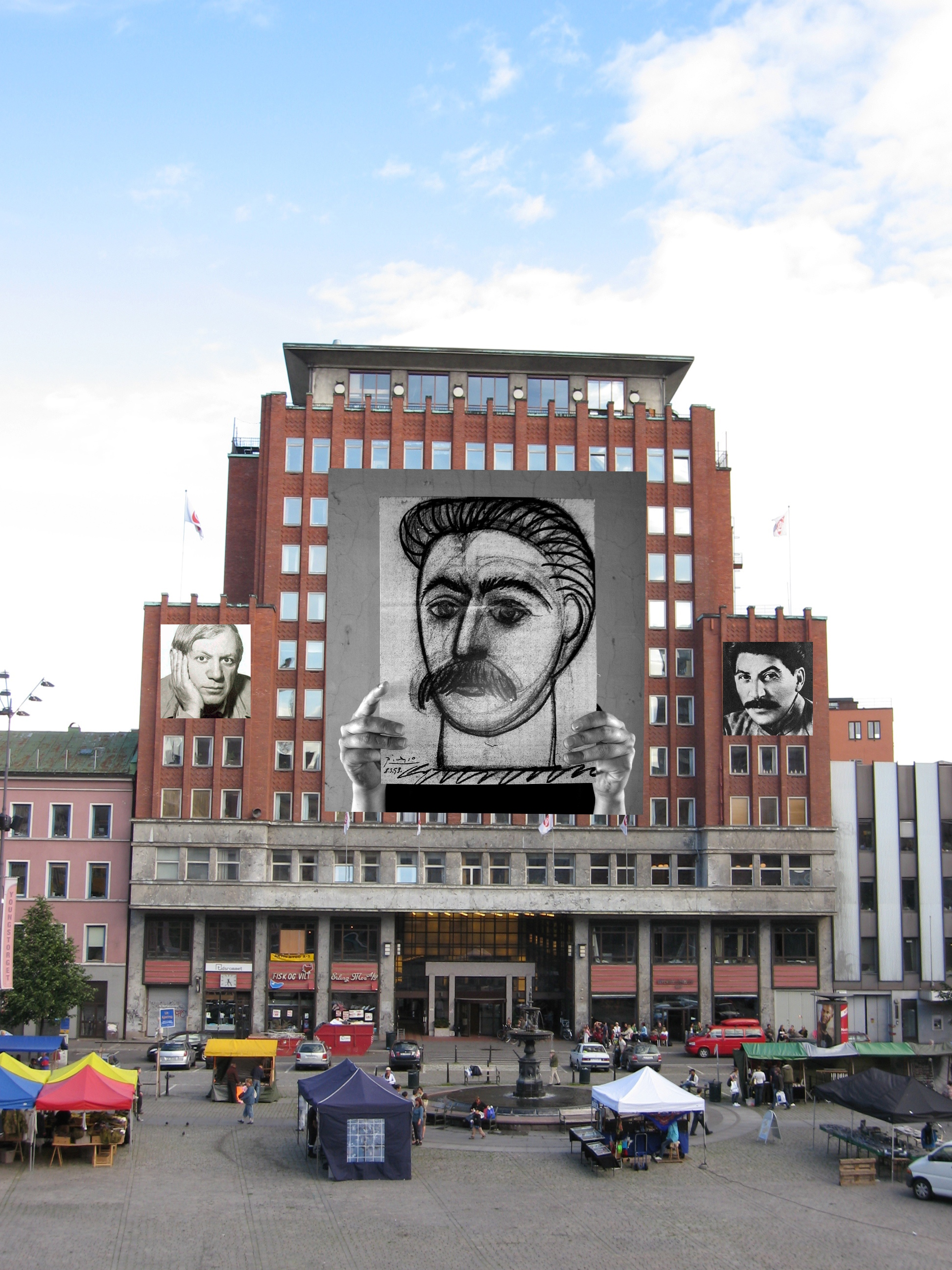
Production still. Stalin by Picasso, Lene Berg. Youngstorget, Oslo, 2008

Stalin by Picasso consists of a book and a film, as well as an outdoor banner, depicting the eponymous portrait, that Berg intended to hang on the facade of Folketeateret at Youngstorget in Oslo. The project received wide media attention when it was revealed that the Norwegian Labour Party, represented by Martin Kolberg, had stopped the realization of the project. The banner was also part of Berg's exhibition at the Cooper Union for the Advancement of Science and Art in 2008, but again was met strong reactions and was taken down without Berg's consent after only two days.

The original portrait was also met with harsh critique. The drawing was commissioned by Louis Aragon, the editor of the French communist party's weekly magazine Les Lettres Françaises. However, after much criticism from fellow party members and colleagues Aragon chose to distance himself from the portrait.

The project addresses the relationship between art and politics, free speech, and the ways in which art challenges political narratives and structures.

==== Kopfkino ====
The film Kopfkino consists of a series of stories told by eight women, seven of whom are BDSM sex workers, and one working as an actress. The women are gathered around a table, dressed as different female clichés of sexual fantasies. They all face the camera, which slowly moves from person to personas the women share their stories and experiences and discuss the work they do or have done. Intimate details and descriptions of taboos highlight questions of forbidden sexual fantasies and the limits between sexual pleasure and violation. Ultimately the film asks what constitutes reality in a universe governed by fictional roles and games, as in BDSM.

In 2013, Kopfkino won the Best Documentary at the 8th Porn Film Festival in Berlin and the Art Critic's Award in Norway. It was also nominated for Best Documentary at the Amanda Award, Norway and Best Nordic Documentary at CPH:DOX, Denmark.

==== Dirty Young Loose ====
The film Dirty Young Loose shows three persons being interrogated, one after another, late one evening after they have acted together in a hotel room scene. The tree characters enact three gendered stereotypes, as encapsulated in the title; dirty man, young boy and loose (i.e. promiscuous) woman. It is unclear which characters have perpetrated what actions, and eventually also the reason for the interrogation. The identity of the interrogators are never revealed nor explained. The film poses questions around issues of authority, surveillance and truth. Based around an idea of so-called objective or neutral video recordings, the film scrutinizes the usage of images in media and judicial cases as proof of guilt, innocence, lies and truth. In 2013 Berg was part of the official Norwegian representation at the 55th International Art Exhibition, la Biennale di Venezia alongside Edvard Munch.

==== GOMP: Tales of Surveillance in Norway 1948-1989 ====
In 2014, Lene Berg staged an event about the illegal surveillance of dissidents in Norway during the Cold War. Witnesses and actors testified about their personal experience of the political surveillance they had either been subject to or had carried out. The event was conducted as a live television broadcast, an event Berg thought the Norwegian Broadcasting Corporation should have organized, but never did.

The project's subsequent film, GOMP: Tales of Surveillance in Norway 1948-1989, uses documentary and fictional elements to frame a piece of Norwegian and Cold War history seen through the eyes of the individuals involved on both sides. GOMP and Dirty Young Loose, were both produced by Studio Fjordholm, the film production company of producer Helga Fjordholm.

==== False Belief ====
False Belief is an autobiographical film that documents the prosecution of Lene Berg's partner through the New York legal system. The story tells in retrospect how charges of harassment by their neighbour develop a momentum of their own in court, without any solid base of evidence. Berg uses photographs, court material and her partner's accounts to reconstruct the events that began when the couple first noticed signs of gentrification in their neighbourhood in Harlem. The evidence that is unveiled points towards a larger system of corruption and racist practice within the legal system, that tries to push black people out of certain districts as a part of systematic gentrification.

In 2019 False Belief was nominated for both the Teddy Award and the Amnesty Award during Berlin International Film Festival.

==== Fra Far/From Father ====
Fra Far/From Father is an extensive project with multiple parts in which Berg explores the life, work and death of her father, the late film-director and writer Arnljot Berg who committed suicide in 1982. Part one was the Festival Exhibition at Bergen Kunsthall in 2022. The second part was Bergs first novel, also entitled Fra far, published by the renown Norwegian publisher Kolon in 2023. The third part of the project will be a feature-length film with the working-title "The Horsemen of the Apocalypse" to be produced by Twentyone Pictures.

The Festival Exhibition (first part of Fra Far/From Father)
The exhibition deals with Berg's own memory as well as the public representation of her father Arnljot Berg. In 1975, when Lene Berg was nine years old, Arnljot Berg was convicted of the murder of his second wife, Evelyne Zammit. For the Festival Exhibition Berg produced video, audio and installation works using material remnants, newspaper articles and personal memories she has of her father. The works were presented across five separate rooms, each exploring a different perspective on the persona of her father. The starting point is a short film entitled "The Day Rises“which follows the process of Berg memorising the scene of the crime before her father’s arrest, despite the fact that she had not been present. The questions about the veracity of memory raised by the film continue throughout the rest of the exhibition. Berg does not try to recreate the exact events of her childhood or to draw a coherent image of her father. Instead, her works investigate the inseparability of fact and fiction within memories. The different medial representations and viewpoints through which Arnljot Berg appears, show the difficulty of enduring the incongruence of a person who is at once a loving father and a convicted murderer.

The exhibition is accompanied by an artist’s book based on Arnljot Berg’s book Fengsel (1979).In addition to the original text, the book consists of inserted letters, pictures, drawings and texts that both add to and contradict Arnljot Berg’s original publication.

== Filmography ==
Title	Year	Length	Production location/notes
The Day Rises	2022	7 minutes	Berlin/Oslo
False Belief	2019	103 minutes	produced by FABB001 AS
Gomp: Tales of Surveillance in Norway 1948-1989	2014	84 minutes	produced by Studio Fjordholm A/S, Oslo
Dirty Young Loose	2013	32 minutes	produced by Studio Fjordholm A/S, Oslo
Kopfkino	2012	75 minutes	Berlin
Shaving the Baroness	2010	7'30 minutes	Berlin
The Drowned One	2008	17 minutes	New York
Stalin by Picasso or Portrait of Woman with Moustache	2008	30 minutes	Oslo/New York 2008
The Weimar Conspiracy	2007	13 minutes	Oslo
Sketches for Nietzsches Laughter	2007	2 minutes	Oslo
The Man in the Background	2006	20 minutes	Stockholm/Oslo
Arschkeks	2005	2 minutes	in collaboration with Nicoleta Esinencu, Stuttgart
The Second	2001	5 minutes	Stockholm
33 minutes	1999	33 minutes	produced by Hinden /Länna-ateljéerna AB, Stockholm
A Woman's Head (En Kvinnas Huvud)	1997	110 minutes	produced by Hinden/Länna- ateljéerna AB, Stockholm
Scent of Happiness (Doft av Lycka)	1991	26 minutes	produced by Andersö & Berg for Dramatiska Institutet, Stockholm
7 (Sju/seven)	1991	26 minutes	Dramatiska Institutet, Stockholm 1991

== Publications ==
- Fra Far / From Father, exhibition calatogue, 237 pages, inserts, ed: Axel Wieder, Bergen Kunsthall 2022
- Gompen og andre beretninger om overvåking i Norge 1948 - 1989, 40 pages, illustrated, ed: Bo Krister Wahlström and Line Ulekleiv with texts by Nils Petter Gleditsch, Tormod Bakke and Wencke Mühleisen KORO/URO 2014
- Dirty Young Loose (Ung Løs Gris), booklet, 16 pages, illustrated, Studio Fjordholm 2013
- Lene Berg, exhibition catalogue, 100 pages, illustrated, ed: Caroline Ugelstad with texts by Sabeth Buchmann, Dieter Roelstraete and Katarina Gregos, Sternberg Press & Henie Onstad Kunstsenter 2012
- Kopfkino, booklet, 34 pages, illustrated, Henie Onstad Kunstsenter 2012
- Stalin by Picasso or Portrait of Woman with Moustache, 180 pages, illustrated, Oslo 2008
- Encounter – Gentlemen & Arseholes, 160 pages with inlays, Berlin/Oslo 2006
- Darwin in Warsaw, 96 pages, illustrated, Warsaw 2005
- Picturing Hegel, Leporello, Stuttgart 2005

== Awards and collections ==
Lene Berg has received several awards for her work including The Elephant Prize, Momentum/The Nordic Art Biennial 2000; Lorck Schive Art Grant 2013 and The Royal Caribbean Art Grant 2013. In 2019 her film False Belief has been nominated for the Teddy Award and the Amnesty Award. Her work has been acquired by Museum of Modern Art (MoMa), New York; National Museum of Art, Architecture and Design, Oslo and Henie Onstad Kunstsenter, as well as private collectors.
