= Sigurd Senje =

Norwegian writer

Sigurd Senje (15 September 1919 – 24 September 1993) was a Norwegian non-fiction writer, novelist and children's writer from Oslo. His writings focused on nature descriptions, local history and World War II.

Senje lectured in secondary school for many years, until he became a full-time writer in 1972.

Among his World War II books are Dum Dum Kuler (Dum Dum Bullets) from 1973 and Forræder Skutt (Traitor Shot) from 1981. Ekko Fra Skriktjenn (Echoes From Skriktjenn) from 1983 treated the Feldmann case, and was the basis for the 1984 film Over grensen (Across the Border).

Among his books on local history are Østmarka from 1974, a book on Akerselva from 1977, and Vi i Østensjøbyen from 1985. His musical Spillet om Sarabråten from 1976 has been performed annually at Sarabråten at Nøklevann, Oslo. He was awarded the Ministry of Culture's prize for Sleiven finner kursen from 1959.
