= Thea Stabell =

Norwegian actress (born 1939)

- Born: Dorothea Jessie Pierstorff; 4 July 1939 (age 87); Oslo, Norway
- Occupations: Actress, director, professor
- Years active: 1963–present
- Website: http://www.khio.no/?action=User.publicOpen;module=Users;ID=2042;template=asearch

Thea Stabell (born 4 July 1939), née Dorothea Jessie Pierstorff, is a Norwegian actress. Stabell's mother was American, and her father worked for the Foreign Service. As a result, she had a nomadic lifestyle growing up, living in both the United States, France and Belgium. She graduated from the Norwegian National Academy of Theatre in 1964, and had her début the same year in the play Boyfriend at Oslo Nye Teater. She has since acted both at Torshovteatret, Hålogaland Teater and Nationaltheatret (the National Theatre), while all the while working as an instructor at Teaterhøyskolen. In 2006 she was hired as a professor here, as the first of her kind with an acting background, not an academic one.

Among the general public Stabell is best remembered for her role as "Ingrid Femte" in the 1972 comedy Norske byggeklosser. She has also acted in other well-known Norwegian movies, such as Balladen om mestertyven Ole Høiland (1970) and Mannen som ikke kunne le (1968), and more recently also in TV-series, among these "Seks som oss" (2005–2007) and "Ved kongens bord" (2005). Stabell is married and has one daughter.

== Select filmography ==
Year	Title	Role
1968	Mannen som ikke kunne le	Nurse
1970	Balladen om mestertyven Ole Høiland	Barbro Aslesdatter
1972	"Fleksnes Fataliteter" (TV) – Blodgiveren (#1.1)	Nurse
1972	Norske byggeklosser	Ingrid Femte
1983	Prima Veras saga om Olav den hellige	Saved lady
1989	Showbiz - eller hvordan bli kjendis på en-to-tre!	Jazzfreaker
2005	"Ved kongens bord" (TV)	Nora Holst
2007	"Kodenavn Hunter" (TV)	Anne Marie Kildal
2005–2007	"Seks som oss" (TV)	Berit
2021	The Worst Person in the World	Åse
