= Arne Lindtner Næss =

Norwegian actor, director and screenwriter

- Born: 19 December 1944; Bergen

Arne Lindtner Næss (born 19 December 1944) is a Norwegian actor, director, television producer, and writer. He has had many film and television roles. The best known may be Frode Birkeland in the television series Familiesagaen De syv søstre on TV2. His father was film director, producer, and screenwriter Peder Hamdahl Næss.

He was awarded the Aamot Statuette in 2019, along with Knut Bohwim.

== Filmography (film and TV) ==
=== Actor (film and TV) ===
- Scorched Earth (1969) - Ilja
- Lukket avdeling (1972) - Den tause
- Kanarifuglen (1973) - Jan
- Karjolsteinen (1977) – Lars
- Kvinnene (1979) - Hotellresepsjonist
- Liten Ida (1981) - den nye faren
- Olsenbandens aller siste kupp (1982) - bodyguard
- Snart 17 (1984) - læreren
- Vestavind (1994, TV Series) - lege (guest star)
- Offshore (1996, TV Series) - Gaute Gravklev (guest star)
- Familiesagaen De syv søstre (1996, TV Series) - Frode Birkeland
- Vänner och fiender (1998, TV Series) - Bjørn Bragernes
- Pioneer (2013) - Minister

=== Director (film and TV) ===
- Hotel Cæsar (1998, TV Series)
- Vazelina Hjulkalender (2000, TV Series)
- Olsenbandens første kupp (2001, TV Series)
- Far og sønn (2002, TV Series)
- Olsenbanden jr. går under vann (2003)
- Olsenbanden jr. på rocker'n (2004)
- Det gode selskap (2004, TV Series)
- Olsenbanden jr. på Cirkus (2006)
- Hemmatt tæl jul (2006) (Christmas show with the Vazelina Bilopphøggers)
- Olsenbanden jr - Sølvgruvens hemmelighet (2007)
- Olsenbanden jr - I mestertyvenes fotspor (2010)
- Magic Silver II (2011)

=== Writer (film and TV) ===
- Familiesagaen De syv søstre (1996, TV Series) - script
- Venner og fiender (1998) - Norwegian script
- Hotel Cæsar (1998, TV Series) - script / storyline
- Olsenbandens første kupp (2001, TV Series) - translation
- Fox Grønland (2001, TV Series) - script
- Olsenbanden jr. går under vann (2003)
- Olsenbanden jr. på rocker'n (2004) - script
- Det gode selskap (2004, TV Series) - script
- Olsenbanden jr - Sølvgruvens hemmelighet (2007)

=== Producer (film and TV) ===
- Vazelina Hjulkalender (2000, TV Series) - creative producer
- Olsenbandens første kupp (2001, TV Series) - creative producer
- Det gode selskap (2004, TV Series) - creative producer

=== Various (film and TV) ===
- Venner og fiender (1998) - Norwegian editor
- Vazelina Hjulkalender (2000, TV Series) - script editor
- Olsenbanden jr. på rocker'n (2004) - lyrics
