= Odd Hilt =

Norwegian sculptor (1915–1986)

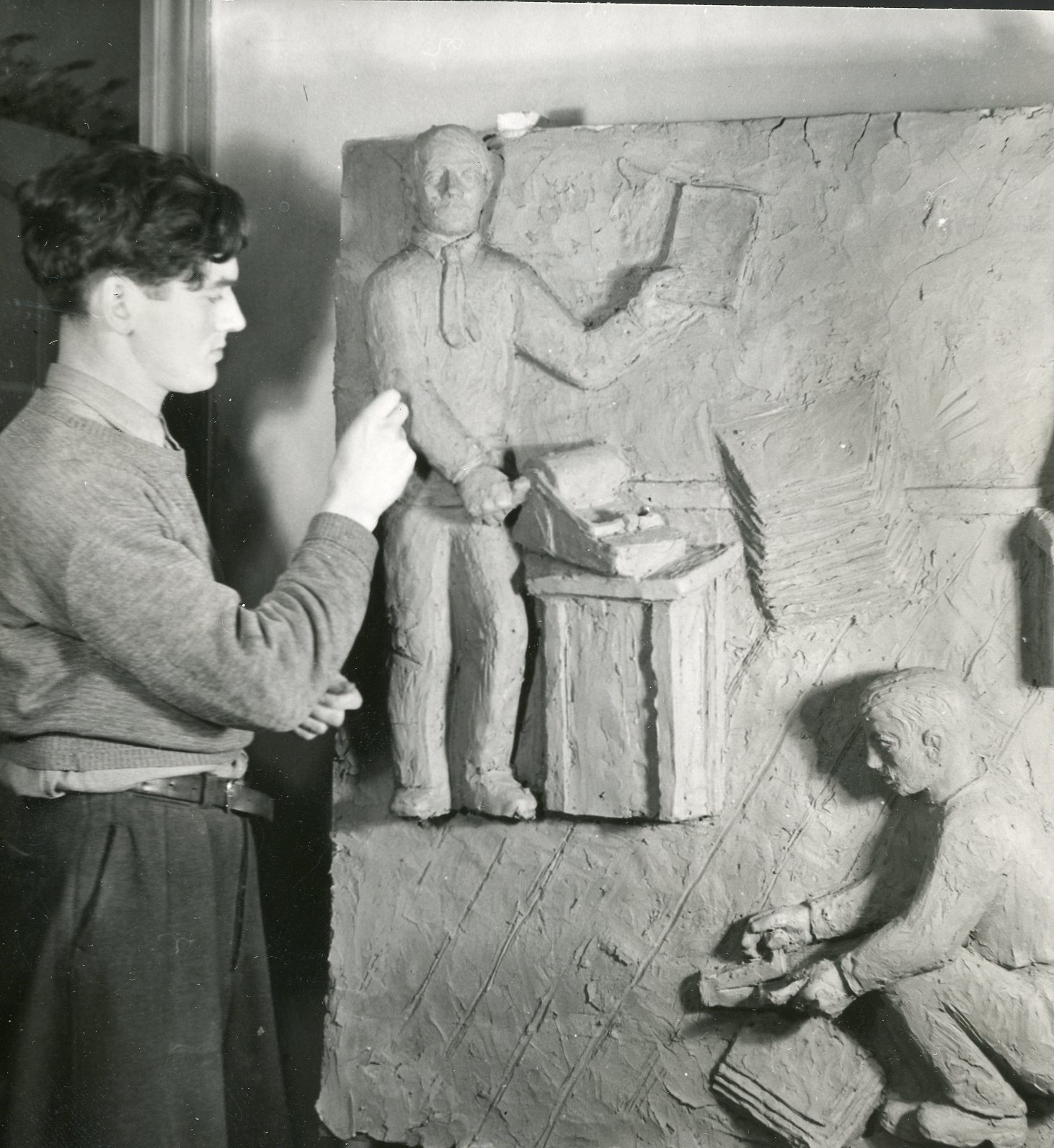
- Hilt pictured with Illegal virksomhet
- Born: 8 March 1915; Drammen, Norway
- Died: 9 December 1986 (aged 71)
- Education: Norwegian National Academy of Craft and Art Industry; Norwegian National Academy of Fine Arts
- Occupation: Sculptor
- Spouse: Guðrun Laura Briem (1918–1996)
- Children: Ragnhild Hilt
- Parent: Christian Hilt

Odd Hilt (8 March 1915 – 9 December 1986) was a Norwegian sculptor.

== Biography ==
Hilt was born at Drammen in Buskerud, Norway. He was the son of Christian Hilt (1888–1958) and Ragnhild Hansen (1896–1957).

He was trained at the Norwegian National Academy of Craft and Art Industry (Statens Håndverks- og Kunstindustriskole) from 1931 to 1933 and under Wilhelm Rasmussen at the Norwegian National Academy of Fine Arts (Statens kunstakademi) from 1933 to 1936.

In 1941, he was arrested in Trondheim and was imprisoned at the Falstad concentration camp outside Levanger. In 1942 he escaped to Sweden until the end of World War II. He performed several works in exile including apostle figures for the altarpiece in Malmberget Church (1944).

From 1935 to 1951 he contributed to the decoration of the Nidaros Cathedral, producing about forty works. Among his other notable sculptural works are Fortuna at Frognerkilen, Arkebusering at Falstad, Ved vannposten at Tøyen and several war memorials. He is represented with eight sculptures at the National Gallery of Norway.

== Personal life ==
In 1945, he married med Guðrun Laura Briem (1918–1996) and was the father of actress Ragnhild Hilt. Ragnhild Hilt.

== Selected works ==
- Arkebusering (1945–46) Levanger
- Appell (1947–50) Horten
- Fortuna (1966–73) Frognerkilen
- Ved vannposten (1977) Tøyen
