= Arnljot Berg =

Norwegian film director

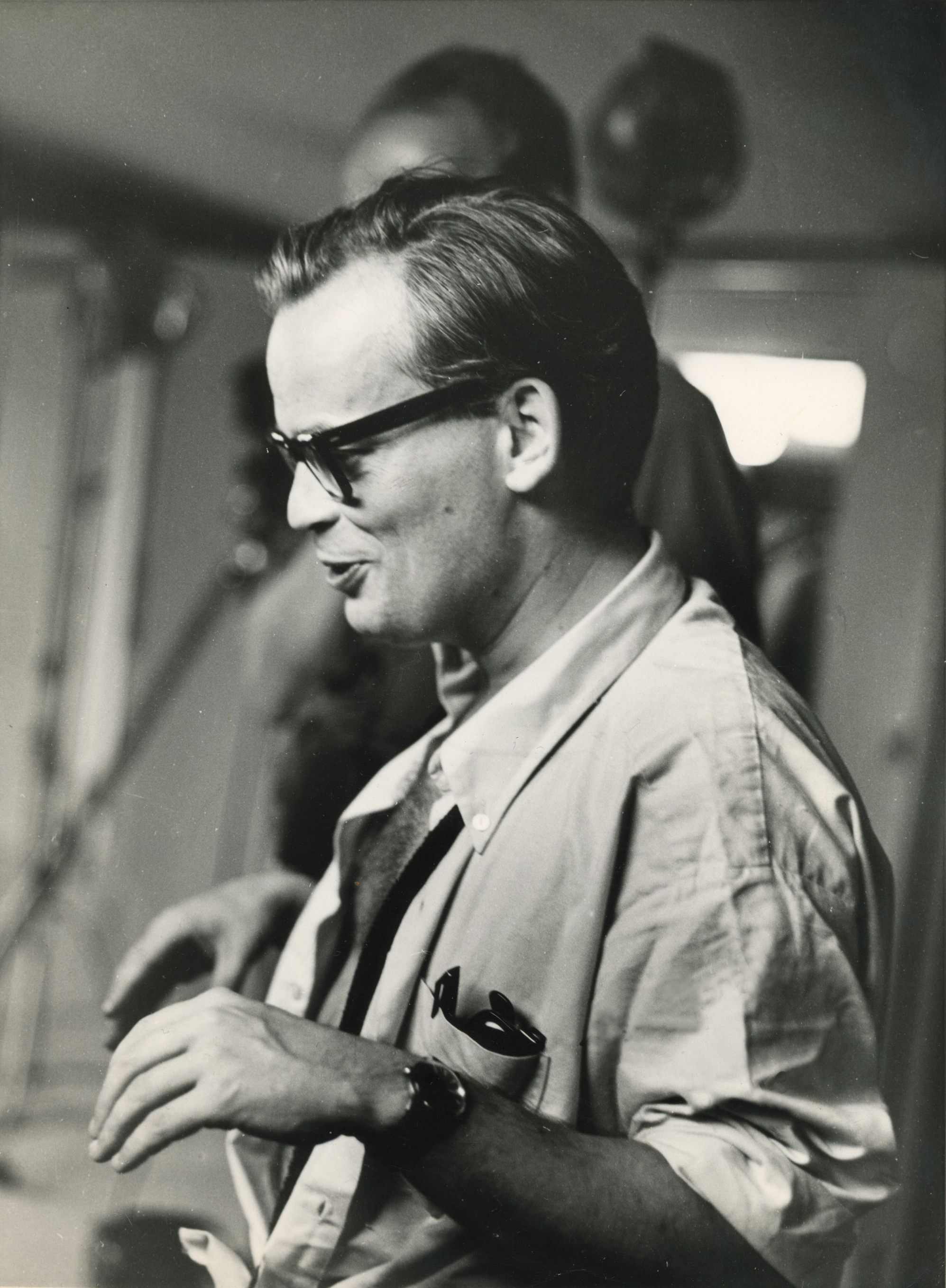
- Born: 22 October 1931
- Died: 9 December 1982 (aged 51)
- Occupation: Film director
- Years active: 1966–1974
- Spouse(s): Edith Toreg (1957–1964*), Mie Berg Simonsen, Evelyn Zammit
- Children: 3, including Lene Berg

Arnljot Berg (22 October 1931 – 9 December 1982) was a Norwegian film director. He directed eight films between 1966 and 1974. His 1972 film Lukket avdeling was entered into the 22nd Berlin International Film Festival and his 1974 film Bobby's War was entered into the 24th Berlin International Film Festival.

== Personal life ==
In 1957, Berg married the Danish film editor Edith Toreg (1921–2003). They had a daughter, Merete Berg Toreg (born 1957), a graphic designer and visual artist. This marriage was later dissolved. He subsequently married Aase Marie (Mie) Ingvaldsen (born 1942). They had two children: Lene Berg (born 1965), a film director and artist, and Marius Sheamus Berg, a furniture designer (born 1968). This marriage was also dissolved. In 1974 he married the French actress Evelyne Zammit (1948–1975).

== Murder of Evelyne Zammit ==
On January 25, 1975, Berg was imprisoned in Paris on suspicion of the murder of his 27-year-old wife, Evelyne Zammit-Berg, and convicted in 1976 of involuntary manslaughter. In 2022, a work by his daughter about the murder, entitled “Fra Far,” was shown at Bergen Kunsthall.

== Filmography ==
- Før frostnettene (1966)
- Echo (1967)
- Tilfluktsrommet (1968)
- Hennes meget kongelige høyhet (1968)
- Huset på grensen (1969)
- Døden i gatene (1970)
- Lukket avdeling (1972)
- Bobby's War (1974)
