= Bo Hermansson =

Swedish film director

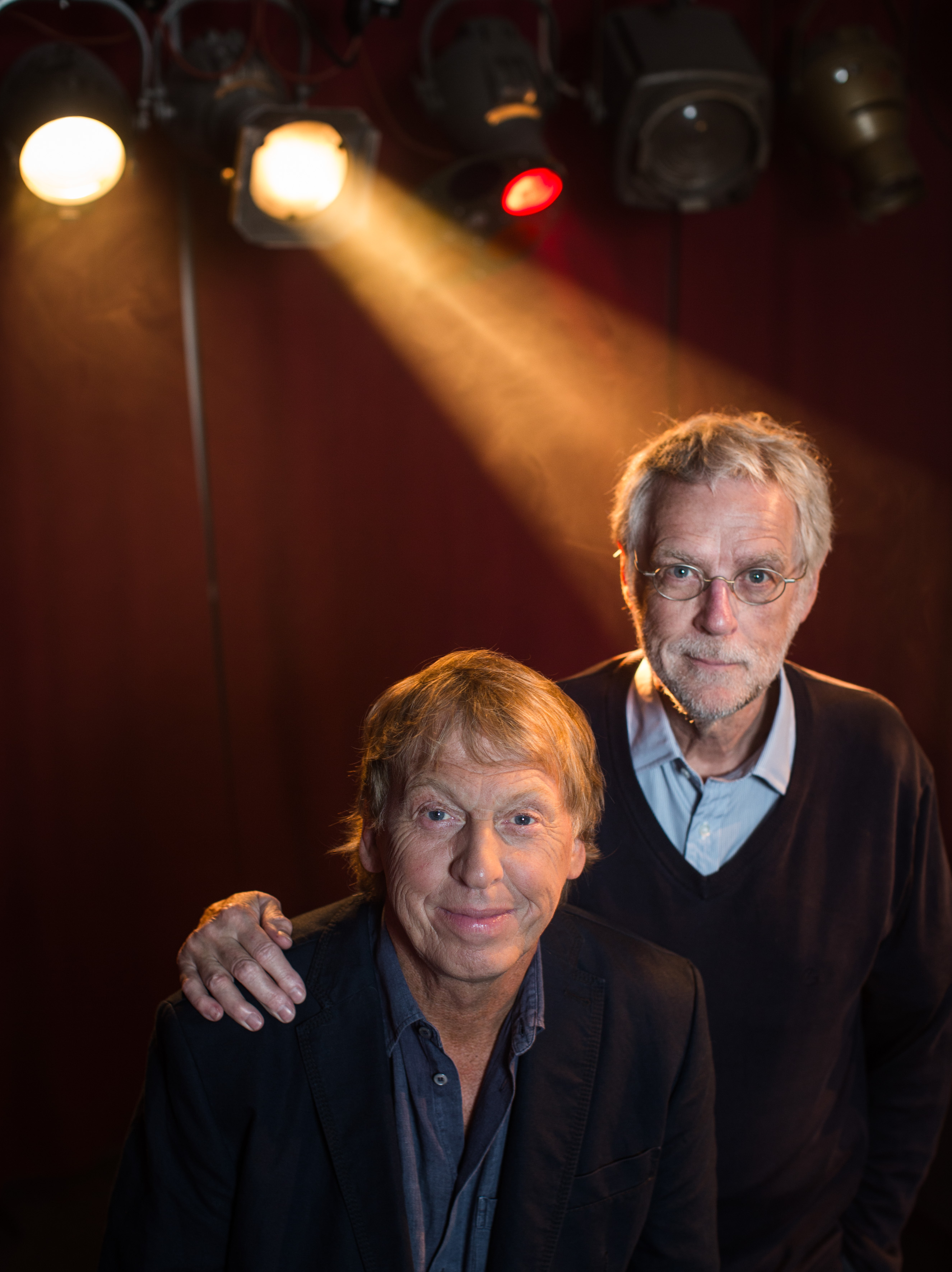
- Bo Hermansson (right) and Tomas von Brömssen
- Born: 16 June 1937 (age 88); Uppsala, Sweden
- Occupations: Film director, screenwriter
- Years active: 1966–2005

Bo Hermansson (born 16 June 1937) is a Swedish film director and screenwriter. His 1974 film The Last Fleksnes was entered into the 9th Moscow International Film Festival.

Through Gothenburg's Student Theater, he came into contact with the then recently established TV business in Gothenburg in the late 1950s. Here he made programs in the most diverse of formats: children's programs, current affairs and drama.

== Selected filmography ==
- The Man Who Could Not Laugh (1968)
- The Last Fleksnes (1974)
