= Karjolsteinen =

1977 film

- Directed by: Knut Andersen
- Written by: Knut Andersen
- Based on: a novel by Sigbjørn Hølmebakk
- Produced by: Svein H. Toreg
- Starring: Erik Øksnes; Marit Grønhaug; Sverre Anker Ousdal; Are Sjaastad; Grethe Ryen; Siri Hølmebakk; Arne Lindtner Næss; Arne Lendl; Marion Eilertsen; Rolf Søder; Liv Thorsen; Åsta Voss; Harald Heide Steen; Arne Lie; Lars Andreas Larssen; Pål Bucher Skjønberg; Knut Hultgren; Frimann Falck Clausen; Eva Solbakken; Anne Semmingsen; Roy Bjørnstad; Gunhild Grünfeld; Thorleif Reiss; Alf Malland
- Distributed by: Teamfilm A/S
- Release date: December 26, 1977
- Running time: 106 minutes
- Country: Norway
- Language: Norwegian

Karjolsteinen (The Carriage Stone) is a Norwegian drama film from 1977. The film was directed by Knut Andersen based on a novel by Sigbjørn Hølmebakk with the same name.

== Plot ==
The radical author Olav Klungeland feels divided and inadequate both as a writer, as a politician, and as a fellow human being. He gradually becomes more acquainted with a former priest, Eilif Grøtteland, who comes from a small place in the southwest and lives in a hotel in Oslo at the same time as his wife is in the hospital, sick with cancer. On a rainy April night, the two young men are sitting in the hotel room. The older man tells the younger one about his life, from his childhood in small conditions further south in the country, through his youth and as a young man at the same time as he worked as a priest in Finnmark.

In the postwar period, the priest's own brother Lars was affected by the treason settlement, and indirectly himself. A gnawing doubt hits him, undermining the love of his wife Elna and their daughter Lillian. The meeting between this priest and the young author will soon prove to be of decisive importance for both of their further lives. During a celebration on May 1, the author Olav is expected to give a fiery speech about the liberating power of socialism. The older man's account makes up most of the story, about his encounters with various people that have meant a lot to his development and attitudes.

== Cast ==
- Erik Øksnes as Olav Klungland
- Marit Grønhaug as Vigdis
- Sverre Anker Ousdal as Eilif
- Are Sjaastad as Eilif (as a child)
- Grethe Ryen as Elna
- Siri Hølmebakk as Elna (as a child)
- Arne Lindtner Næss as Lars
- Arne Lendl as Lars (as a child)
- Rolf Søder as Arnold
- Roy Bjørnstad as the party chairman
- Frimann Falck Clausen as Jens Heimdal
- Maryon Eilertsen as Lillian
- Harald Heide Steen as Didrik
- Thorleif Reiss as the judge
