= Border guide =

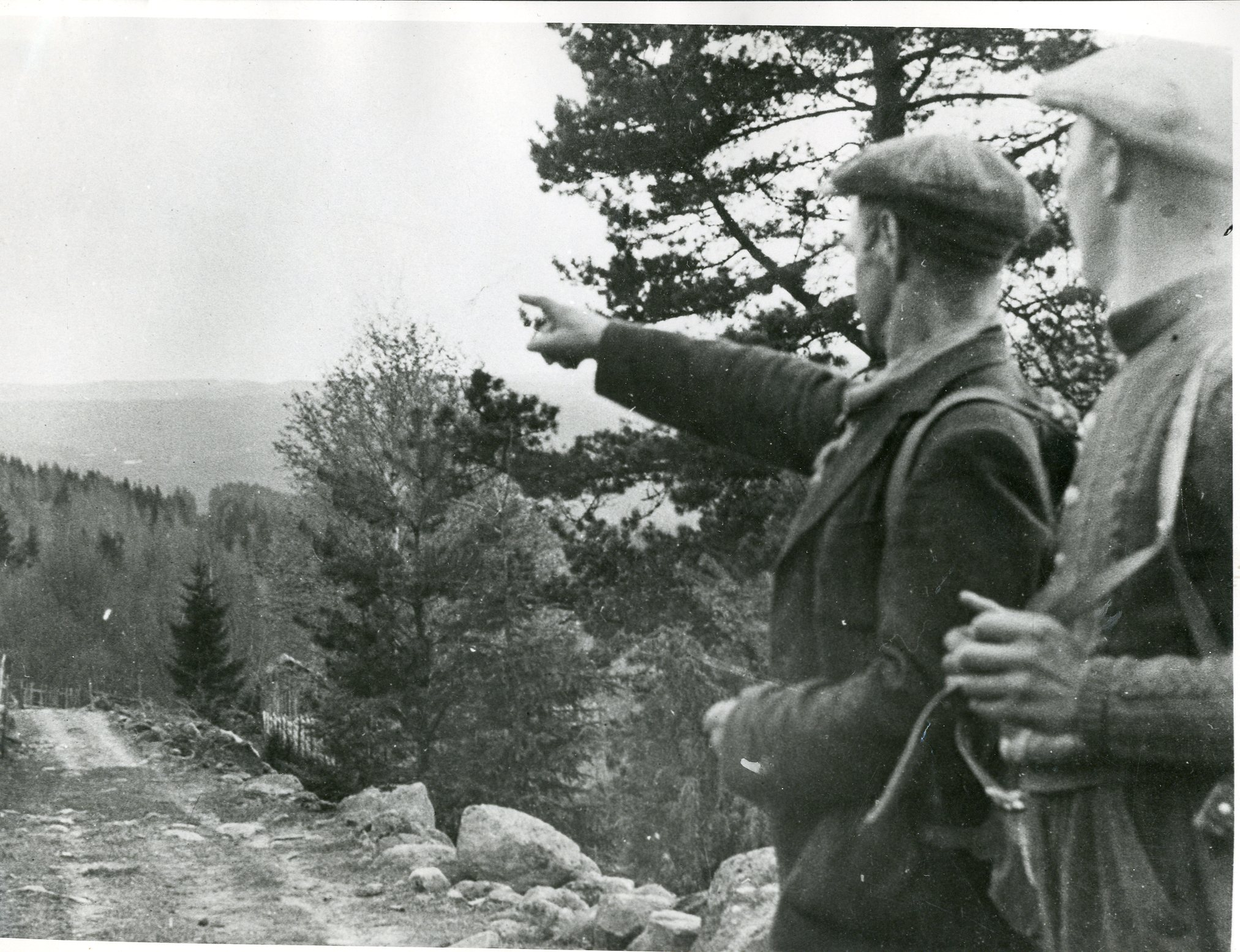
Norwegian refugees during the Second World War could obtain help from border guides to cross the border to safety in neutral Sweden.

A border guide (Norwegian: grenselos, Swedish: gränslots) was a person that helped refugees from Norway escape over the Norway–Sweden border during the Second World War. There were probably over a thousand Norwegian border guides active during the Second World War. Men, women, and children served as border guides and assisted in guiding a total of 40,000 refugees to safety across the border in neutral Sweden.

== Background ==
On the same day that Norway was attacked by Nazi Germany, some people started fleeing to Sweden. Initially this was relatively easy, with few controls. As the German occupation authorities gained control over the country in spring and summer 1940, control at the border intensified and border passports were issued to residents.

With an increasing demand from people with various backgrounds to escape to Sweden, there was a need for local knowledge at the border to help refugees safely cross to the Swedish side. The Norwegian resistance movement gradually established systems with transport routes for refugees, in which locally known border guides were the last link in the chain that took them to safety.

== Aftermath ==
After the war, those that had served as border guides did not receive public recognition. Instead, they were largely forgotten or faced accusations of treason. This was exacerbated by the fact that many of the border guides were ethnically Sami and continued to face discrimination after the war.

== See also ==
- The Feldmann case, a Norwegian married couple murdered by border guides
- Refugees from Norway during the Second World War
- The North Sea Traffic during the Second World War
- People smuggling
