= Joachim Calmeyer =

Norwegian actor

Kåre Joachim Calmeyer (23 June 1931 – 26 December 2016) was a Norwegian actor. He was born in Oslo, and grew up in Horten and Tromsø. He was the brother of jazz musician Ola and journalist Bengt Calmeyer.

He made his stage debut at Rogaland Teater in 1953 in the opera Don Pasquale. He was employed at Rogaland Teater from 1956 to 1960, at Det Norske Teatret from 1960 to 1964, Nationaltheatret from 1964 to 1972, Den Nationale Scene from 1972 to 1978 and then in Nationaltheatret. He has also appeared in Fjernsynsteatret, and played in Før frostnettene (1966), Lars i porten (1984), Sigurd Drakedreper (1989), Vestavind (1994) and the main role in Kitchen Stories (2003).

He was an honorary member of the Norwegian Actors' Equity Association and was decorated as a Knight, First Class of the Order of St. Olav in 2001. In 2012 he was given the Amanda Committee's Honorary Award. Calmeyer died on 26 December 2016 at the age of 85.
