= Espen Thorstenson =

Norwegian film director (1940–2019)

- Born: 27 November 1940
- Died: 15 January 2019 (aged 78)
- Education: Institut des hautes études cinématographiques
- Occupation: Film director
- Notable work: Dager fra 1000 år (1970); Bak sju hav (1991)

Espen Thorstenson (27 November 1940 – 15 January 2019) was a Norwegian film director.

== Career ==
Thorstenson was educated at the Institut des hautes études cinématographiques in Paris. His films include Dager fra 1000 år (1970), further the two films Mormor og de åtte ungene i byen (1977) and Mormor og de åtte ungene i skogen (1979), based on children's books by Anne-Cath Vestly, and Bak sju hav (1991), a film about Pakistani immigrants to Norway.

He died on 15 January 2019, aged 78.
