= Arven (1979 film) =

1979 film

- Directed by: Anja Breien
- Written by: Anja Breien
- Produced by: Harald Ohrvik
- Starring: Espen Skjønberg
- Cinematography: Erling Thurmann-Andersen
- Edited by: Henning Carlsen; Christian Hartkopp
- Release date: 13 August 1979
- Running time: 95 minutes
- Country: Norway
- Language: Norwegian

Arven (also known as Next of Kin) is a 1979 Norwegian drama film directed by Anja Breien. It was entered into the 1979 Cannes Film Festival.

== Plot ==
At a funeral for a successful business man, the last will and testament is to be read. People at the funeral will all inherit the family company if it is jointly run by all the heirs.

== Cast ==
- Espen Skjønberg - Jon Skaug
- Anita Björk - Märta Skaug
- Häge Juve - Hanna Skaug
- Jan Hårstad - Jonas Skaug
- Jannik Bonnevie - Eva Skaug
- Jonas Brunvoll - Presten
- Pelle Christensen - Advokaten
- Jack Fjeldstad - Sam Pettersen
- Mona Hofland - Rut Petersen
- Svein Sturla Hungnes - Arne Torjussen
- Ada Kramm - Fru Marie Skaug
- Eva Opaker - Gerd Skaug
