= Lina's Wedding =

1973 film

- Directed by: Knud Leif Thomsen
- Written by: Sigbjørn Hølmebakk; Knud Leif Thomsen
- Starring: Ingerid Vardund
- Cinematography: Mattis Mathiesen
- Release date: 12 February 1973 (Norway)
- Running time: 101 minutes
- Countries: Denmark; Norway
- Languages: Danish; Norwegian

Lina's Wedding (Norwegian: Jentespranget) is a 1973 Danish-Norwegian drama film directed by Knud Leif Thomsen. It was entered into the 8th Moscow International Film Festival, where Ingerid Vardund won the award for Best Actress.

== Cast ==
- Ingerid Vardund as Lina
- Roy Bjørnstad as Gilbert
- Rolf Søder
- Erling Andresen
- Eilif Armand
- Bente Brunvoll (voice)
- Edith Carlmar
- Per Christensen
- Vegard Hall
- Mette Lange-Nielsen
- Arne Lie
