= Øivind Johnssen =

Øivind Johnsen (26 May 1922 – 1 February 2005) was a Norwegian sports journalist, broadcaster and actor.

After several years of studying Drama in the United Kingdom, Johnsen began working in radio plays for Norwegian Listener, he also acted on stage in plays such as Hamlet. In 1959 he joined the Norwegian radio and television company NRK as a sports commentator for which he commentated on football and tennis games. He covered the 1964 Winter Olympics and the 1988 Summer Olympics for NRK. During the coverage for the 1988 Olympic games, Johnsen suffered a stroke. In addition to sporting events Johnsen also commentated on the Norwegian Constitution Day for 20 times and was the NRK commentator for the 1963 Eurovision Song Contest.

Johnsen died on 1 February 2005, after suffering another stroke.
