= Ingerid Vardund =

Norwegian actress (1927–2006)

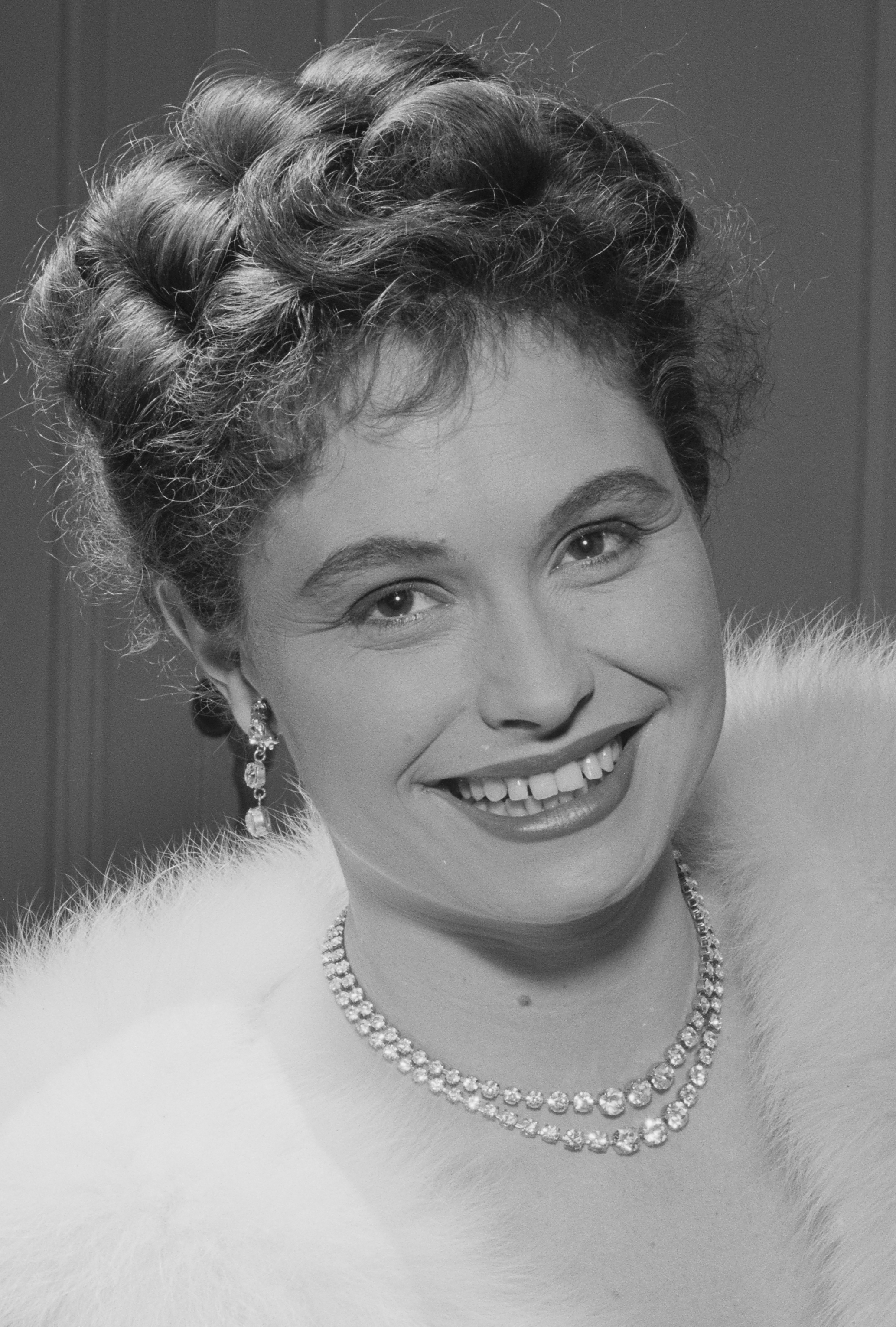
- Ingerid Vardund in 1955
- Born: 24 April 1927; Oslo, Norway
- Died: 25 December 2006 (aged 79); Oslo, Norway
- Occupation: Actress
- Years active: 1949–1995

Ingerid Vardund (24 April 1927 – 25 December 2006) was a Norwegian actress. She was known to the Norwegian audience primarily for her roles in the films Jentespranget (1973) and the sit-com Hjemme hos oss (1980). For her role in Jentespranget, she won the award for Best Actress at the 8th Moscow International Film Festival.

Vardund debuted on stage in 1947 at the Chat Noir, and on the screen five years later with the movie Andrine og Kjell. In 1971 she toured in Japan with Nationaltheatret (the National Theatre) as Nora in A Doll's House. She acted in a number of movies, and worked at Nationaltheatret from 1958 to 1993.

== Selected filmography ==
- No Man's Woman (1953) as Mimmi
- Hjem går vi ikke (1955) as car workshop owner's girlfriend
- 5 loddrett (1959) as the nightclub singer Anita Daae
- Sønner av Norge (1961) as Eva Wikdahl, the dentist
- Lina's Wedding (1973) as Lina
- Over grensen (1987) as Rakel Feldmann
