= Douglas (film) =

- Directed by: Pål Bang-Hansen
- Written by: Pål Bang-Hansen; Haavard Haavardsholm (novel)
- Starring: Rolv Wesenlund; Tom Tellefsen; Per Christensen; Kjersti Døvigen
- Release date: 3 September 1970
- Running time: 90 minutes
- Country: Norway
- Language: Norwegian

Douglas is a 1970 Norwegian drama film directed by Pål Bang-Hansen, starring Rolv Wesenlund and Kjersti Døvigen. It is based on a 1968 novel by Haavard Haavardsholm. The film presents a critical view of the activities of the secret police.
