= Døden i gatene =

- Directed by: Arnljot Berg
- Written by: Arnljot Berg
- Starring: Grynet Molvig; Per Tofte; Arne Lindtner Næss
- Release date: 1970
- Running time: 96 minutes
- Country: Norway
- Language: Norwegian

Døden i gatene (English: Death in the Streets) is a 1970 Norwegian drama film directed by Arnljot Berg, starring Grynet Molvig, Per Tofte and Arne Lindtner Næss. Youthful revolt is used as a cover for a government coup.

== Plot ==
The story begins with a gang of intelligent guerrillas, free-spirited hippies and harsh motorcyclists who freak out and try to convince the population that they are being immersed by the consumer society, while at the same time being ruled by a democratic fascist state with armed police. After demonstrating and being harassed by the authorities, the youth get enough. They decide to make a political coup by first taking over the press, then kidnapping the government, and finally pacifying the population by pouring a mesmerizing potency agent into their drinking water. In the end, it all ends in a bloody massacre in which the youth are shot by the military.
