= Ingeranna Krohn-Nydal =

Norwegian film director

- Born: 1958

Ingeranna Krohn-Nydal is a Norwegian film director. Her film Amindas verden won the 1993 International Federation of Film Critics award at the International Leipzig Festival for Documentary and Animated Film. Krohn-Nydal's other work includes the 51 minute documentary on the life of Dagny Juel titled Død madonna (Dead Madonna).
