= Bengt Calmeyer (journalist) =

Norwegian journalist and novelist (born 1932)

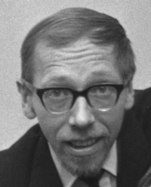
- Calmeyer in 1965
- Born: 3 October 1932 (age 93); Oslo, Norway
- Occupations: Journalist; Novelist
- Relatives: Joachim Calmeyer (brother); Ola Calmeyer (brother)

Bengt Calmeyer (born 3 October 1932) is a Norwegian journalist and novelist. He was born in Oslo, and is a brother of actor Joachim Calmeyer. He was assigned with the newspaper Arbeiderbladet from 1959, where he was a foreign correspondent in London from 1965, and later cultural editor. His books include NRK – myter og virkelighet from 1977 and Forsinket oppgjør: arbeiderbevegelsen og den politiske overvåking from 1993. He has written the crime novels Åpen grav (1967) and De hemmelige døde (1968), where the detective is a freelance journalist. Later fictional works include the trilogy Mennesker from 1997, Vitner from 1999 and Spor from 2000.
