= Ragnhild Hilt =

Norwegian actress (1945–2014)

Ragnhild Hilt (20 September 1945 – 25 June 2014) was a Norwegian actress.

She was born in Oslo as a daughter of sculptor Odd Hilt. She took her education at the National Academy of Theatre, and spent her entire career at the Det Norske Teatret from 1971 to the spring of 2014.

She made her film debut in 1971's Rødblått paradis. Her last film was 2013's I Belong, for which she was nominated for an Amanda Award. She died in June 2014.
