= The Last Fleksnes =

- Directed by: Bo Hermansson
- Written by: Ray Galton; Alan Simpson (original story); Bo Hermansson; Rolv Wesenlund (writers)
- Starring: Rolv Wesenlund; Aud Schønemann
- Release date: 4 November 1974
- Running time: 87 minutes
- Country: Norway
- Language: Norwegian

The Last Fleksnes (Norwegian: Den siste Fleksnes) is a 1974 Norwegian comedy film directed by Bo Hermansson, starring Rolv Wesenlund and Aud Schønemann. The film is based on the television sitcom Fleksnes Fataliteter. It was entered into the 9th Moscow International Film Festival.

Marve Fleksnes (Wesenlund) lives a comfortable life with his mother (Schønemann), but misses a woman in his life. He is afraid he might become the last Fleksnes. His mother enrols him in a charm school, where he excels. At the same time, a young lady moves into the apartment across the hall.

== Cast ==
- Rolv Wesenlund as Marve Fleksnes
- Aud Schønemann as Modern
- Finn Mehlum as Faderen
- Per Christensen as Per
- Britt Langlie as Britt Andersen
- Kjersti Døvigen as Unni
- Marit Kolbræk as Karin
- Ella Hval as Frk. Gustavsen
- Knut M. Hansson as Ekteskapsformidler
- Julie Ege as Herself
