= Anja Breien =

Norwegian film director (1940–2026)

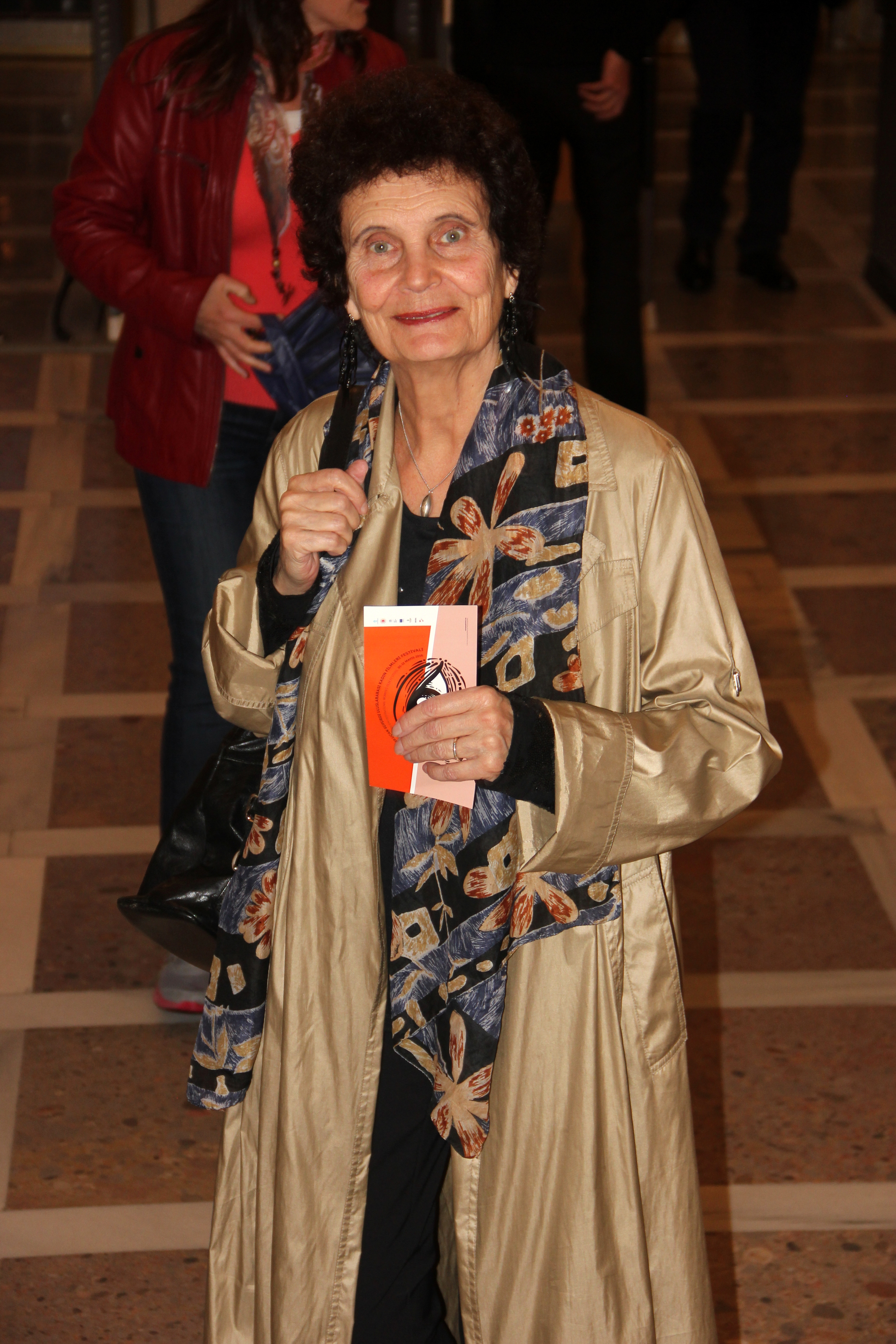
- Breien in 2016
- Born: 12 July 1940; Oslo, Norway
- Died: 10 May 2026 (aged 85)
- Occupations: Film director, screenwriter
- Years active: 1967–2026

Anja Breien (12 July 1940 – 10 May 2026) was a Norwegian film director and screenwriter. One of the leading figures of the Norwegian film industry, and one of the first women to rise to prominence as a writer-director in Norway, Breien's body of work in fiction and documentary explores social and political issues, notably women's rights within the context of Norwegian society.

== Background ==
Born in Oslo on 12 July 1940, Breien was a daughter of writer Hans Breien and Dagmar Munch Søegaard. She did not marry, but was a partner of Thorvald Stoltenberg from 2014 to 2018.

Breien died on 10 May 2026, at the age of 85.

== Career ==
After completing her studies in French at the University of Oslo, Breien went on to graduate from the French film school L'Institut des hautes études cinématographiques (IDHEC) in 1964. She began working in film as a script supervisor on the Nils R. Müller film Det Store Varpet in 1961. She also worked as an assistant director on Hunger (Sult) (1966), directed by Henning Carlsen and based on the novel by Knut Hamsun.

Breien's first film as a director and screenwriter was a short in 1967 titled Growing Up, followed by her short documentary 17. May – A Film about Rituals (17. Mai – En film om ritualer) (1969), a satirical look at the celebration of the Norwegian National Day. Her first feature-length film was Rape (Voldtekt), released in 1971. Rape was praised by critics, but also sparked debate due to its criticism of the Norwegian criminal justice system.

Breien subsequently wrote and directed Wives (Hustruer) (1975), which became a box-office success and received critical acclaim throughout Scandinavia. Wives was inspired as a feminist response to John Cassavetes' Husbands (1972), and follows three women in their thirties who temporarily abandon their domestic responsibilities for a day of freedom. Breien went on to write and direct two sequels, Wives - Ten Years After (Hustruer 10 År Etter) (1985) and Wives III (Hustruer 20 År Etter) (1996), featuring the same characters ten and twenty years later.

In 1981's Witch Hunt (Forfølgelsen), Breien again critiqued her home country's patriarchal society through the story of a woman accused of witchcraft in 1630s western Norway. Witch Hunt was entered into the main competition of the 1981 Venice Film Festival.

Breien's 1979 film Next of Kin (Arven), also known as Heritage and The Inheritance, a drama about a Norwegian family in conflict over an inheritance, was nominated for the Palme d'Or at the 1979 Cannes Film Festival; it ended up winning the Prize of the Ecumenical Jury.

Breien directed most of the films produced from her screenplays, one exception being 1994's Second Sight (Trollsyn), directed by Ola Solum.

In addition to her extensive work in fiction cinema, Breien continued to make documentaries throughout her career, many of which have been screened internationally. Her short documentary Solvorn (1997), constructed around a series of photographs taken by Breien's grandmother, screened at the Berlin International Film Festival in 1998.

== Style ==
Breien is noted for her realist approach to storytelling, her use of the long take, and her use of a slow, contemplative pace. Rape (1971) uses a non-chronological storytelling technique and has been compared to Asghar Farhadi’s A Separation (2011).

== Selected filmography ==
Year	Film	Role	Genre
1967	Growing Up / Vokse opp	Writer/Director	Fiction short
1969	17. May – A Film about Rituals / 17. Mai – En film om ritualer	Writer/Director	Documentary short
1971	Rape / Voldtekt	Writer/Director	Fiction
1975	Wives / Hustruer	Writer/Director	Fiction
1977	Games of Love and Loneliness / Den allvarsamma leken	Writer/Director	Fiction
1979	Next of Kin / Arven	Writer/Director	Fiction
1981	Witch Hunt / Forfølgelsen	Writer/Director	Fiction
1984	Paper Bird / Papirfuglen	Writer/Director	Fiction
1985	Wives - Ten Years After / Hustruer 10 År Etter	Writer/Director	Fiction
1990	Twice Upon a Time / Smykketyven	Writer/Director	Fiction
1994	Second Sight / Trollsyn	Writer	Fiction
1996	Wives III / Hustruer III	Writer/Director	Fiction
1997	Solvorn / Solvorn	Writer/Director	Documentary short
2001	To See a Boat in Sail / Å se en båt med seil	Writer/Director	Fiction short
2005	Untitled – Sans Titre / Uten tittel	Writer/Director	Fiction short
2009	Etching / Riss	Writer/Director	Documentary short
2009	Yezidi / Jezidi	Writer/Director	Documentary
2012	From the History of Chewing Gum / Fra tyggengummiens historie	Writer/Director	Documentary short

== Awards and nominations ==
Year	Festival	Award	Film	Result
1979	Cannes Film Festival	Prize of the Ecumenical Jury	Next of Kin / Arven (1979)	Won
1979	Cannes Film Festival	Palme d'Or	Next of Kin / Arven (1979)	Nominated
1984	Chicago International Film Festival	Silver Hugo	Paper Bird / Papirfuglen (1984)	Won
2001	Berlin International Film Festival	Prix UIP Berlin	To See a Boat in Sail / Å se en båt med seil (2001)	Won
2001	Toronto Worldwide Short Film Festival	Best Live-Action Short	To See a Boat in Sail / Å se en båt med seil (2001)	Won
