= Bente Erichsen =

Norwegian film director

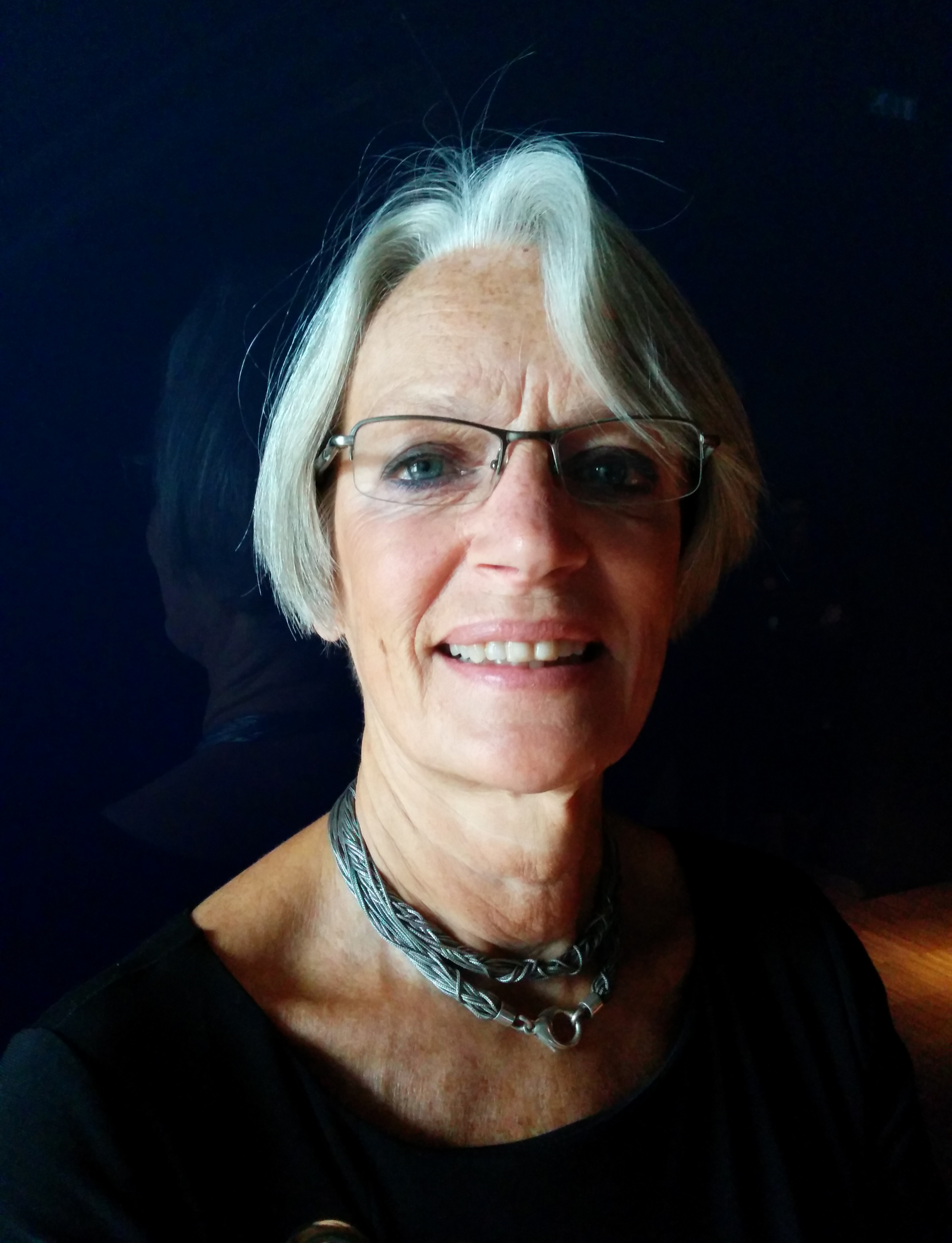
- Born: January 7, 1949 (age 77); Norway
- Known for: Director, Nobel Peace Center
- Spouse: Lasse Glomm

Bente Erichsen (born 7 January 1949) is a Norwegian culture director and the current (and inaugural) Director of the Nobel Peace Center.

A former journalist and commercials producer, Erichsen started her career as feature film producer in 1979. By 1998 she had produced 17 features, in addition to directing Over grensen (The Feldmann Case, 1987) and People and Robbers of Cardemom Town (1988), as well as a number short films. Erichsen was also the founder of the Amanda Award (The Norwegian film award) and a co-founder of Heddaprisen (The Norwegian Theatre Award).

From 1991 to 1993 Erichsen headed the culture programme of the 1994 Olympic Winter Games in Norway. She was director of Hedmark Theatre from 1993 to 1997 and director of Norway's National Touring Theatre from 1997 to 2005. In 2005 she became the first director of the Nobel Peace Center.

Erichsen has held board positions at numerous film and theatre institutions, and since 2006 has been chair of Amnesty International Norway. and The Open Theatre, Oslo.

In addition to writing numerous film scripts, Erichsen is also author of the book Culture Collision.

Cultural offices
Preceded by Terje Hartviksen	Director of the Riksteatret; 1997–2005	Succeeded by Ellen Horn
