= Bobby's War =

1974 film

- Directed by: Arnljot Berg
- Written by: Arnljot Berg
- Starring: Erik Andersson
- Cinematography: Knut Gløersen
- Edited by: Bente Kaas
- Release date: 1974
- Running time: 89 minutes
- Country: Norway
- Language: Norwegian

Bobby's War (Norwegian: Bobbys krig) is a 1974 Norwegian drama film directed by Arnljot Berg. It was entered into the 24th Berlin International Film Festival.

== Plot ==
Robert Lund, an unemployed and alcoholic jazz musician, has sole responsibility for his son, Bobby. The two live in a squalid apartment where debt collectors and creditors make their daily existence bleak. Lacking both a job and money, Robert is forced to provide for their needs through questionable means. As he struggles to find musical gigs, father and son escape their grim reality by retreating into a world of dreams and fantasies.

To add color to their lives, Robert spins increasingly fantastic tall tales. These stories evolve from accounts of his glory days as a musician to claims of a secret past as a spy and a master criminal. Bobby adores these stories, and even when it becomes clear that his father is not telling the truth, he chooses to repress the reality. Amidst this, Bobby finds a new confidant in an unlikely figure—a German soldier who becomes a friend and helps them during their darkest moments. Ultimately, the roles reverse as Bobby’s growing strength and love for his father provide a sense of hope even after they have lost everything.

== Cast ==
- Erik Andersson – Bobby Lund
- Roy Bjørnstad – Robert Lund
- Morten Andresen – Hjemmefrontsmann
- Eilif Armand – Tusseladden
- Urda Arneberg – Serveringsdame
- Carsten Byhring – Hirdmann
- Geir Børresen – Lærer
- Bente Børsum – Fru Lund
- Detlev Eckstein – Werner
- Arne Aas – Direktøren
