= Rape (film) =

1971 Norwegian film by Anja Breien

- Directed by: Anja Breien
- Starring: Svein Sturla Hungnes
- Distributed by: Norsk Film (Norway)
- Release date: 1971
- Country: Norway
- Language: Norwegian

Rape (Norwegian: Voldtekt) is a 1971 Norwegian film by director Anja Breien. The film deals with a young man who is mistakenly accused of one rape and one attempted rape and how he is being processed by the judicial system. The film is shot in black and white and is divided into sections corresponding to the respective sections of Norwegian trial law which the accused encounters.
