= List of Norwegian actors =

This is a list of articles about Norwegian actors ordered alphabetically by last name.

== A, Å ==
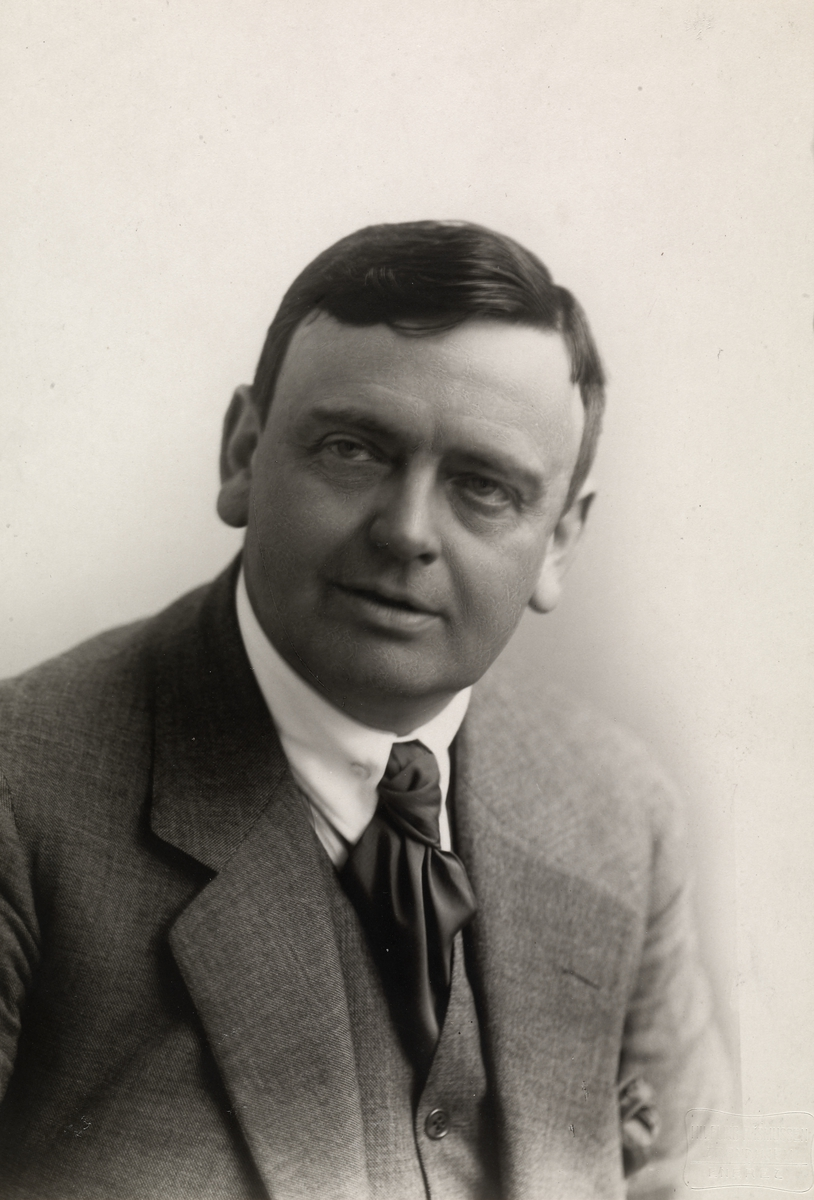
Hauk Aabel

- Hauk Aabel
- Per Aabel
- Harald Aimarsen
- Zahid Ali
- Iselin Alme
- Rønnaug Alten
- Leif Amble-Næss
- Bjarne Andersen
- Inger Marie Andersen
- Siw Anita Andersen
- Marit Andreassen
- Anna-Lisa
- Atle Antonsen
- Eilif Armand
- Frøydis Armand
- Gisken Armand
- Merete Armand
- Urda Arneberg
- Conrad Arnesen
- Haakon Arnold
- Arthur Arntzen
- Janicke Askevold
- Per Fredrik Åsly
- Egil Åsman
- Per Asplin
- Trond Fausa Aurvåg

== B ==
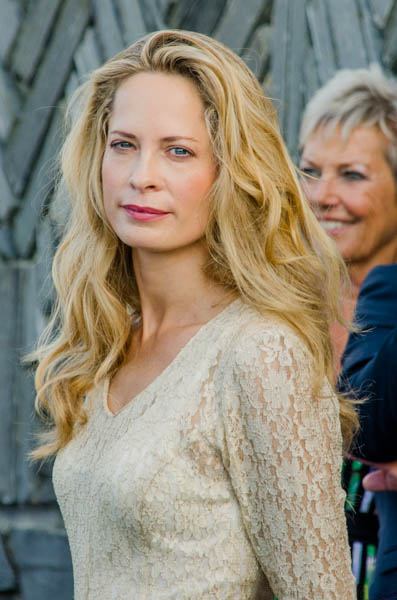
Maria Bonnevie

- Bentein Baardson
- Anders Baasmo
- Øystein Bache
- Anna Bache-Wiig
- Håvard Bakke
- Turid Balke
- Elisabeth Bang
- Arne Bang-Hansen
- Kjetil Bang-Hansen
- Pål Bang-Hansen
- Petronella Barker
- Arthur Barking
- Tula Belle
- Ingrid Bolsø Berdal
- Gustav Berg-Jæger
- Theodor Berge
- Eva Bergh
- Lene Elise Bergum
- Victor Bernau
- Finn Bernhoft
- Sofie Bernhoft
- Unni Bernhoft
- Andrea Berntzen
- Mari Bjørgan
- Roy Bjørnstad
- Magda Blanc
- Magne Bleness
- Øivind Blunck
- Alf Blütecher
- Bjarne Bø
- Alisha Boe
- Albert Vilhelm Bøgh
- Jens Bolling
- Maria Bonnevie
- Odd Borg
- Vanessa Borgli
- Geir Børresen
- Aagot Børseth
- Henrik Børseth
- Bente Børsum
- Harriet Bosse
- Berit Brænne
- Randi Brænne
- Trond Brænne
- Margit Brataas
- Kolbjørn Brenda
- Heidi Gjermundsen Broch
- Ida Elise Broch
- Nicolai Cleve Broch
- Per Bronken
- Louise Brun
- Jonas Brunvoll Jr.
- Trond Brænne
- Johannes Brun
- Tove Bryn
- Karl Ludvig Bugge
- Marie Magdalene Bull
- Kolbjørn Buøen
- Sæbjørn Buttedahl
- Aase Bye
- Carsten Byhring

== C ==
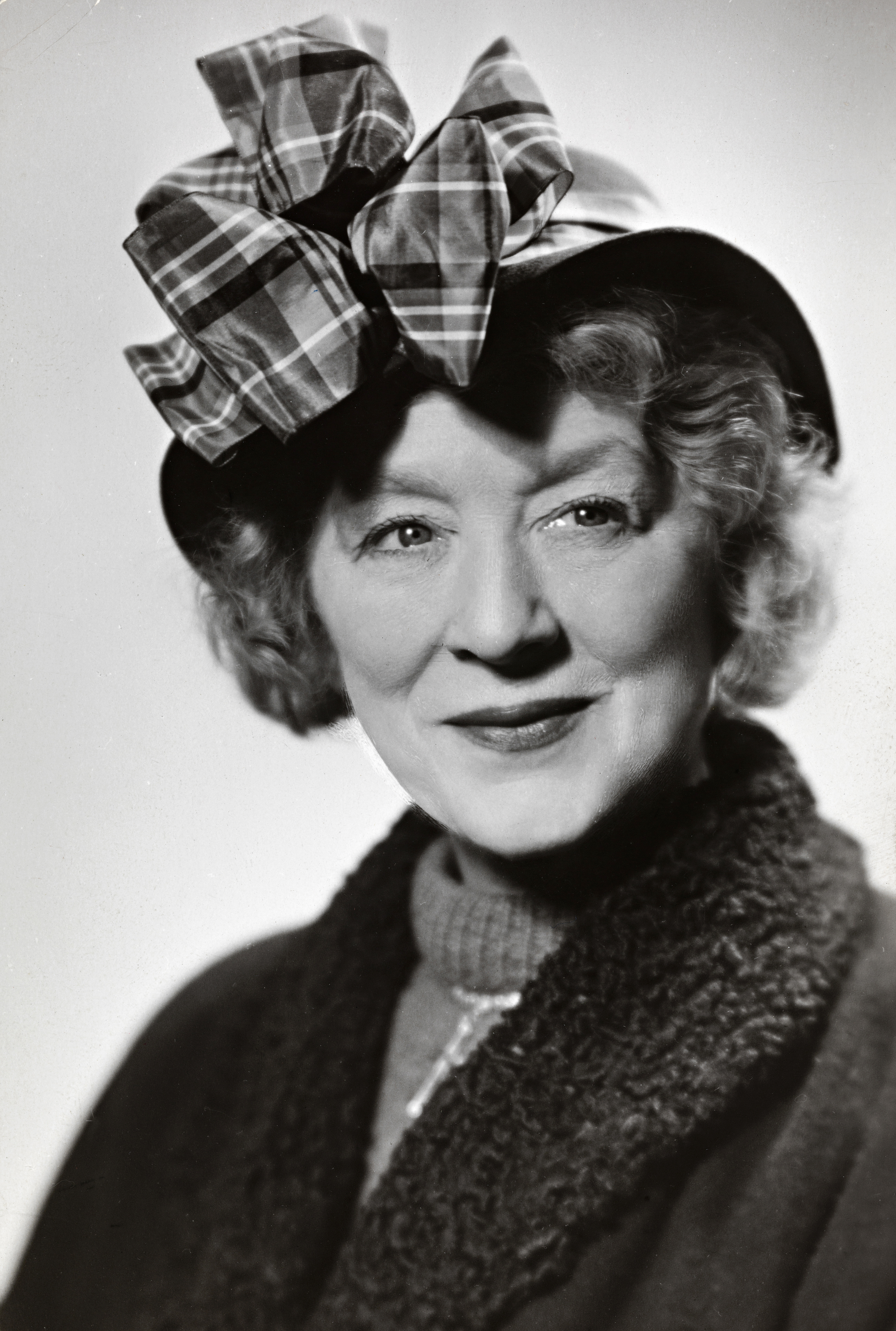
Lalla Carlsen

- Joachim Calmeyer
- Sofie Cappelen
- Edith Carlmar
- Otto Carlmar
- Lalla Carlsen
- Bab Christensen
- Gyda Christensen
- Nils Reinhardt Christensen
- Per Christensen
- Rolf Christensen
- Ingeborg Cook
- Kåre Conradi

== D ==
- Ewa Da Cruz
- Sophus Dahl
- Juni Dahr
- Rolf Daleng
- Tone Danielsen
- Signe Danning
- Ingvild Deila
- Aagot Didriksen
- Ernst Diesen
- Kari Diesen
- Øystein Dolmen
- Liv Dommersnes
- Kjersti Døvigen
- Ulrikke Hansen Døvigen
- Edvard Drabløs
- Erling Drangsholt
- Anneli Drecker
- Svend von Düring
- Johanne Dybwad

== E ==
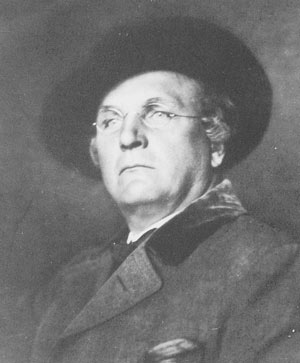
Egil Eide

- Edel Eckblad
- Espen Eckbo
- Johannes Eckhoff
- Sigurd Eldegard
- Julie Ege
- Ingjerd Egeberg
- Aud Egede-Nissen
- Oscar Egede-Nissen
- Stig Egede-Nissen
- Hildegunn Eggen
- Harald Eia
- Egil Eide
- Jon Eikemo
- Maryon Eilertsen
- Per Christian Ellefsen
- Lena Kristin Ellingsen
- Kjersti Elvik
- Leif Enger
- Ole Enger
- Åsleik Engmark
- Berit Erbe
- Henning Eriksen
- Uta Erickson
- André Eriksen
- Beate Eriksen
- Jacob Margido Esp
- Unni Evjen

== F ==
- Einar Fagstad
- Alma Fahlstrøm
- Johan Fahlstrøm
- Vibeke Falk
- Magnus Falkberget
- Mona Fastvold
- Frithjof Fearnley
- Jack Fjeldstad
- Lise Fjeldstad
- Veronika Flåt
- Bjørn Floberg
- Lizzie Florelius
- Astrid Folstad
- Emilie da Fonseca
- Minken Fosheim
- Tore Foss
- Wenche Foss
- Hjalmar Fries
- Charlotte Frogner
- Kristin Frogner
- Kristine Froseth

== G ==
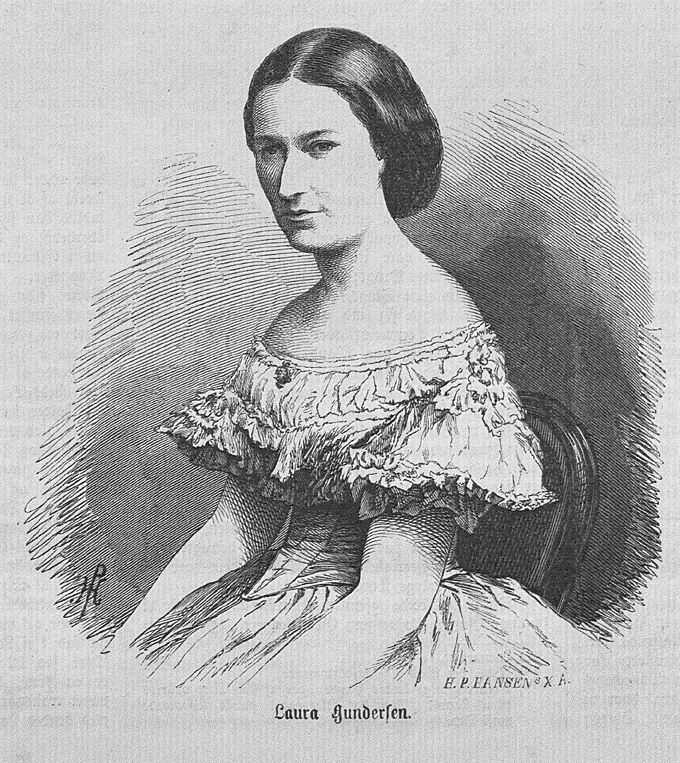
Laura Gundersen

- Mikkel Gaup
- Nils Gaup
- Kat Gellin
- Claes Gill
- Ingar Helge Gimle
- Martin Gisti
- Henry Gleditsch
- Jarl Goli
- Laila Goody
- Elisabeth Gording
- Elisabeth Granneman
- Bredo Greve
- Gerd Grieg
- Grace Grung
- Hilde Grythe
- Odd Grythe
- Anne Gullestad
- Jon Eivind Gullord
- Laura Gundersen
- Mia Gundersen
- Sigvard Gundersen
- Jens Gunderssen
- Aslag Guttormsgaard
- Greta Gynt

== H ==
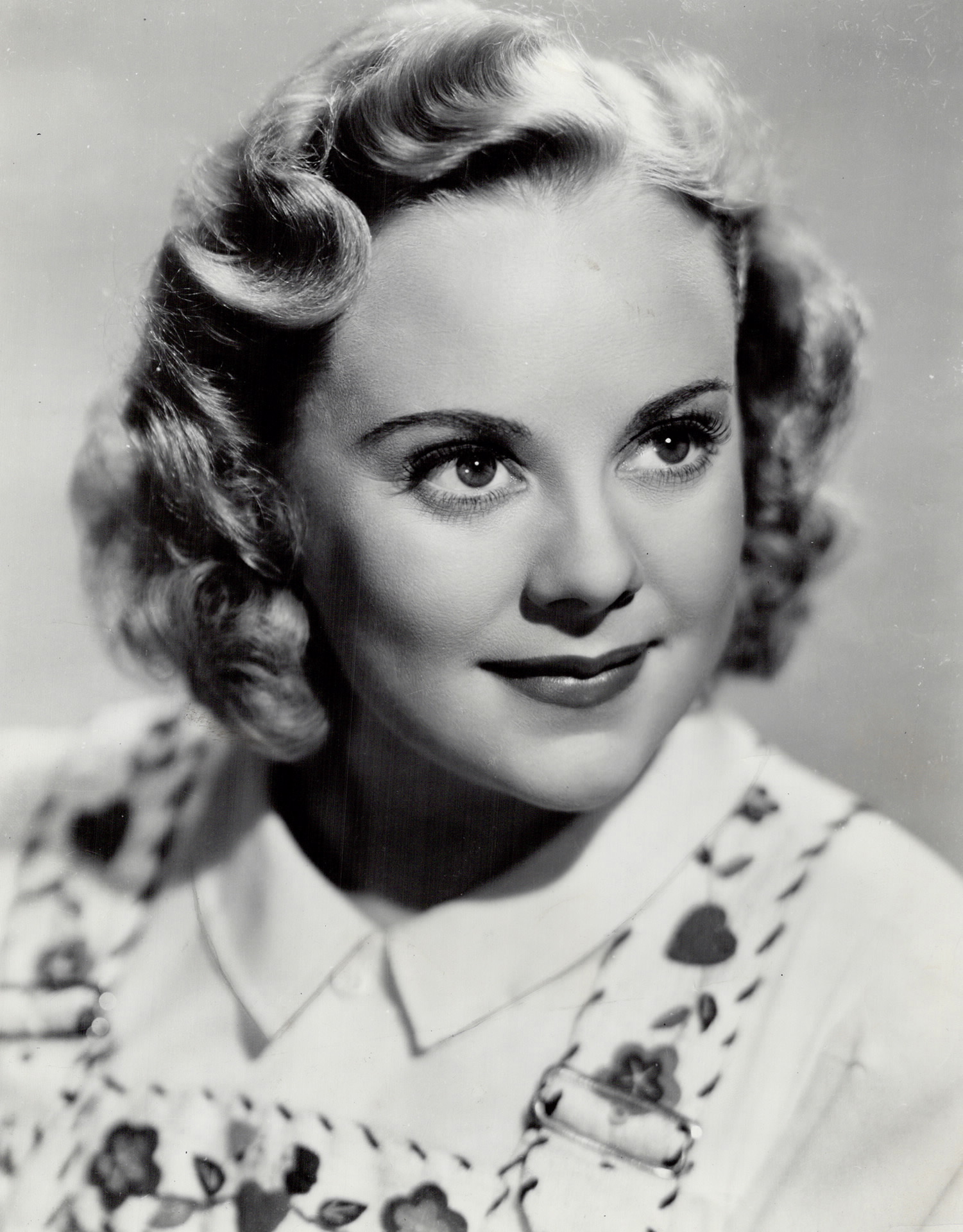
Sonja Henie

- Brit Elisabeth Haagensli
- Jonathan Haagensen
- Agnete Haaland
- Ingjald Haaland
- Turid Haaland
- Pål Sverre Valheim Hagen
- Klaus Hagerup
- Nils Hald
- Ragnhild Hald
- Stein Grieg Halvorsen
- Marie Hamsun
- Henriette Hansen
- Sverre Hansen
- Knut Mørch Hansson
- Olaf Mørch Hansson
- Eili Harboe
- Morten Harket
- Thorbjørn Harr
- Jan Hårstad
- Terje Hartviksen
- Veslemøy Haslund
- Anders Hatlo
- Gunnar Haugan
- Solveig Haugan
- Kim Haugen
- Per Theodor Haugen
- Gøril Havrevold
- Olafr Havrevold
- Kristian Hefte
- Jon Heggedal
- Gustav Adolf Hegh
- Else Heiberg
- Kirsten Heiberg
- Harald Heide-Steen jr.
- Kine Hellebust
- Liv Heløe
- Benjamin Helstad
- Sonja Henie
- Aksel Hennie
- Camilla Stroem Henriksen
- Stig Frode Henriksen
- Knut Hergel
- Ragnhild Hilt
- Erik Hivju
- Kristofer Hivju
- Haakon Hjelde
- Bjarte Hjelmeland
- Egil Hjorth-Jenssen
- Willie Hoel
- Anette Hoff
- Stig Henrik Hoff
- Mona Hofland
- Espen Klouman Høiner
- Sverre Holm
- Kjersti Holmen
- Joachim Holst-Jensen
- Betzy Holter
- Karl Holter
- Didi Holtermann
- Sverre Horge
- Ellen Horn
- Andrea Bræin Hovig
- Benedicte Hundevadt
- Svein Sturla Hungnes
- Knut Husebø
- Sigrid Huun
- Ella Hval

== I ==
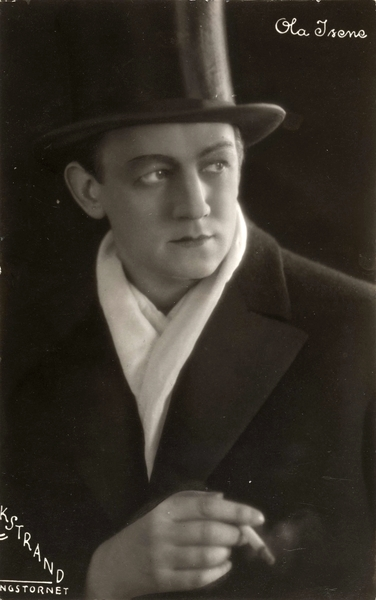
Ola Isene

- Lillebil Ibsen
- Andreas Isachsen
- Janny Grip Isachsen
- Ellen Isefiær
- Ola Isene

== J ==
- Anne Marit Jacobsen
- Inger Jacobsen
- Knut Jacobsen
- Per Jansen
- Otto Jespersen
- Ola B. Johannessen
- Pål Johannessen
- Kristoffer Joner
- Helge Jordal
- Leif Juster
- Sissel Juul

== K ==
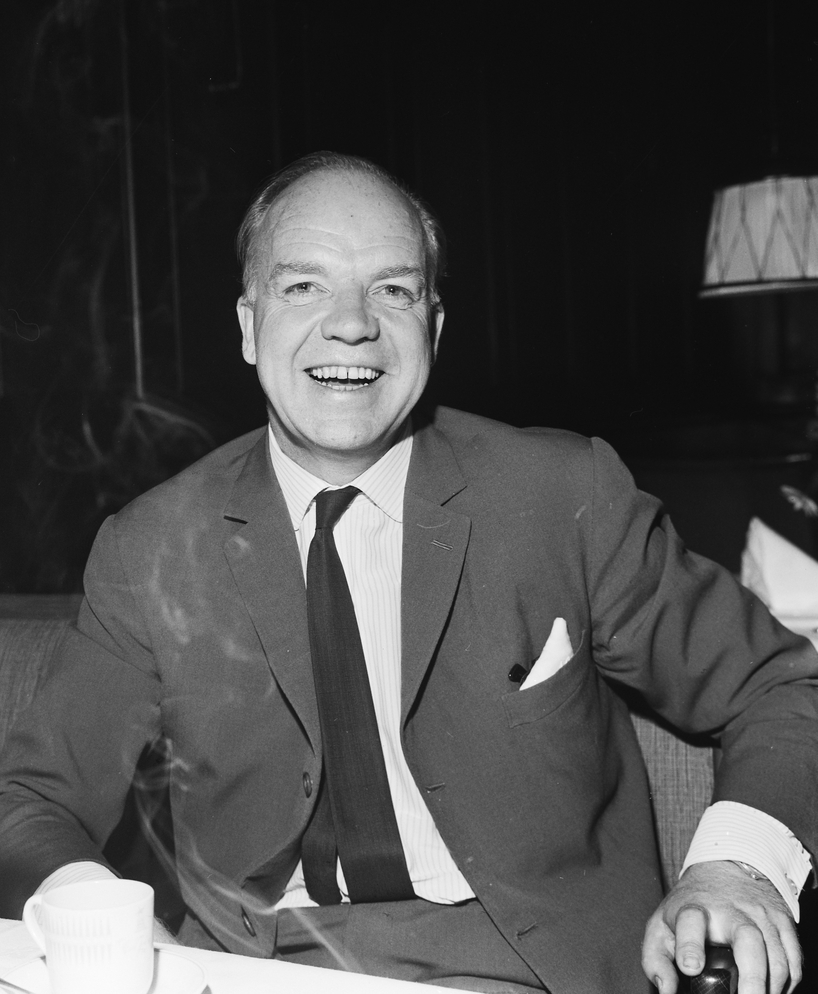
Henki Kolstad

- Nils Jørgen Kaalstad
- Reidar Kaas
- Bente Kahan
- Grethe Kausland
- Adil Khan
- Negar Khan
- Marit Velle Kile
- Trond Kirkvaag
- Agnes Kittelsen
- Jorunn Kjellsby
- Johan Kjelsberg
- Frank Kjosås
- Thoralf Klouman
- Wenche Klouman
- David Knudsen
- Erike Kirstine Kolstad
- Henki Kolstad
- Lasse Kolstad
- Lisa Loven Kongsli
- Herborg Kråkevik
- Ada Kramm
- Anne Krigsvoll
- Marianne Krogness
- Sossen Krohg
- Georg Herman Krohn
- Frank Krog
- Kaare Kroppan
- Jannike Kruse
- Finn Kvalem
- Per Kvist

== L ==
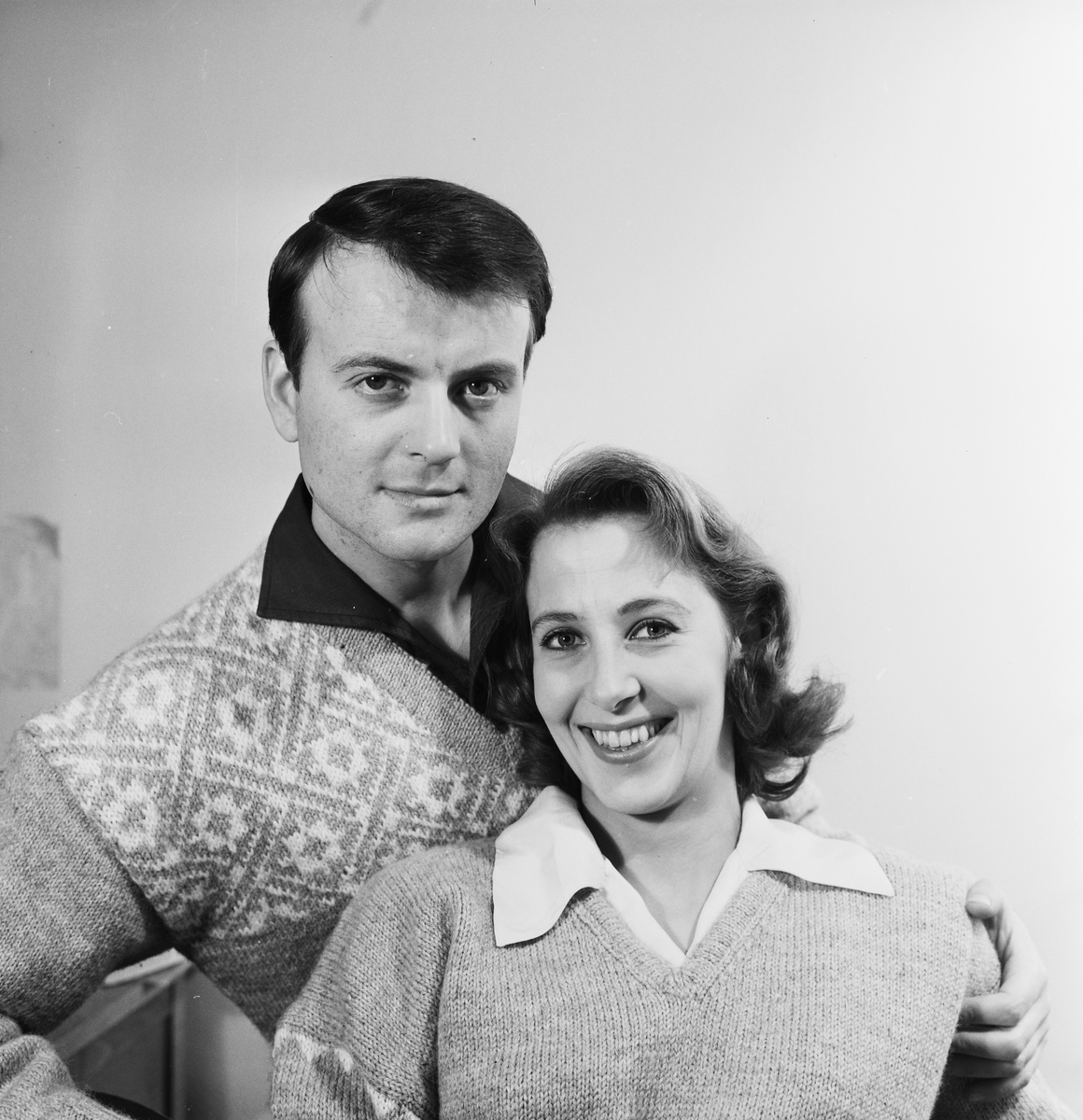
Per Lillo-Stenberg and Mette Lange-Nielsen

- Finn Lange
- Mette Lange-Nielsen
- Jørgen Langhelle
- Britt Langlie
- Rolf Kristian Larsen
- Tryggve Larssen
- Lars Andreas Larssen
- Rolf Kristian Larsen
- Dore Lavik
- Britta Lech-Hanssen
- Tutte Lemkow
- Anders Danielsen Lie
- Arne Lie
- Per Lillo-Stenberg
- Liv Lindeland
- Lothar Lindtner
- Martin Linge
- Anneke von der Lippe
- Kalle Løchen
- Georg Løkkeberg
- Vibeke Løkkeberg
- Birger Løvaas
- Thorleif Lund
- Vilhelm Lund
- Hilde Lyrån
- Elsa Lystad
- Knut Lystad
- Synnøve Macody Lund
- Thorleif Lund
- Eva Lunde
- Hilde Lyrån
- Elsa Lystad

== M ==
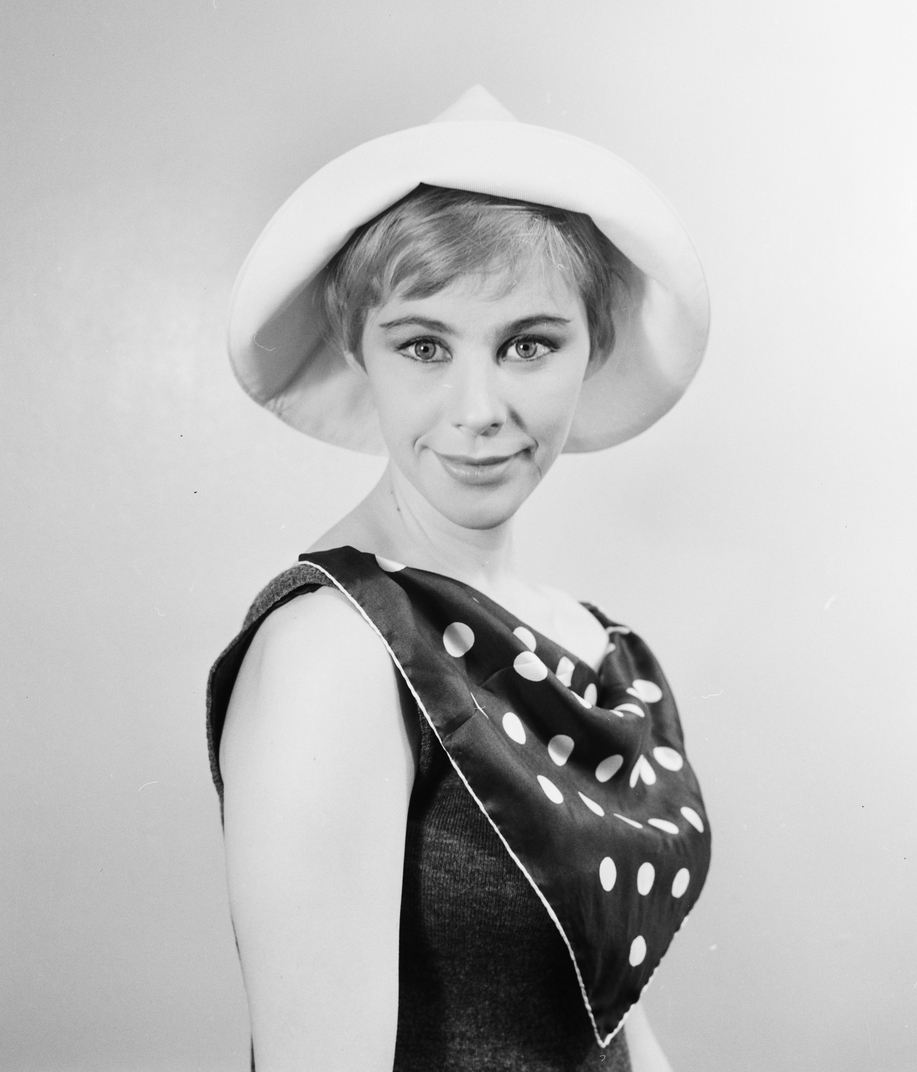
Henny Moan

- Harald Mæle
- Abigael Heber Magnussøn
- Sigurd Magnussøn
- Alf Malland
- Natassia Malthe
- Øystein Martinsen
- Henriette Mathiesen
- Tom Mathisen
- Alfred Maurstad
- Mari Maurstad
- Toralv Maurstad
- Gørild Mauseth
- Katja Medbøe
- Wenche Medbøe
- Mildred Mehle
- David Menkin
- Henrik Mestad
- Ragnhild Michelsen
- Daud Mirza
- Fridtjof Mjøen
- Sonja Mjøen
- Jon Lennart Mjøen
- Lars Mjøen
- Henny Moan
- Tarjei Sandvik Moe
- Grynet Molvig
- Cally Monrad
- Cecilie Mosli
- Tone Mostraum
- Agnes Mowinckel
- Lillian Müller
- Wenche Myhre
- Dagmar Myhrvold
- Trond Peter Stamsø Munch

== N ==
- Arne Lindtner Næss
- Petter Næss
- Randi Lindtner Næss
- Thea Sofie Loch Næss
- Thora Neels-Hansson
- Live Nelvik
- Fredrikke Nielsen
- Ellen Nikolaysen
- Hans Jacob Nilsen
- Ole-Jørgen Nilsen
- Rolf Just Nilsen
- Siri Nilsen
- Arvid Nilssen
- Aagot Nissen
- Trond Nilssen
- Greta Nissen
- Sven Nordin
- Grete Nordrå
- Lars Nordrum
- Alf Nordvang
- Yngvar Numme
- Lisbeth Nyborg
- William Nyrén
- Lene Nystrøm

== O, Ø ==
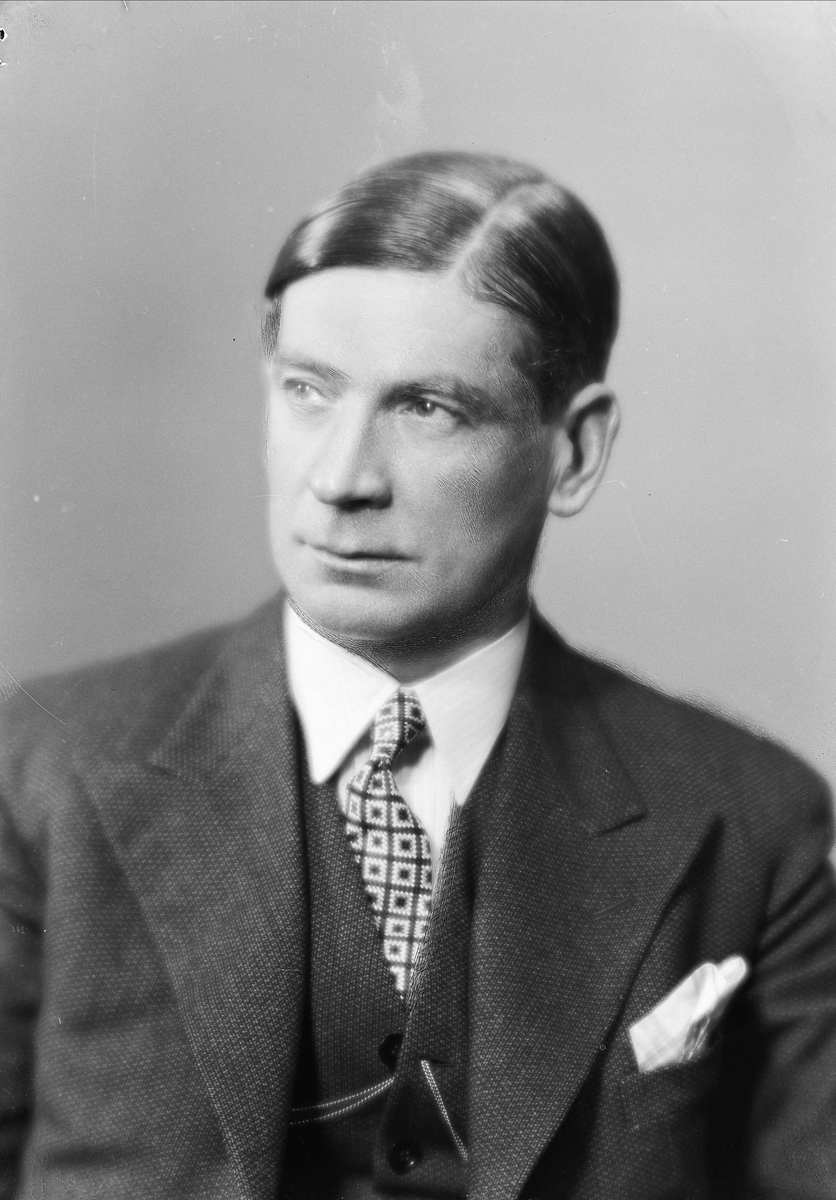
August Oddvar

- August Oddvar
- Kristian Ødegård
- Nina Ellen Ødegård
- Jakob Oftebro
- Nils Ole Oftebro
- Jon Øigarden
- Ingrid Olava
- Gunnar Olram
- Arne Thomas Olsen
- Kari Onstad
- Lydia Opøien
- Arve Opsahl
- Jørn Ording
- Liv Bernhoft Osa
- Ola Otnes
- Anne Marie Ottersen
- Marian Saastad Ottesen
- Sigrun Otto
- Mads Ousdal
- Sverre Anker Ousdal
- Baard Owe
- Gard Øyen
- Lars Øyno

== P ==
- Sofie Parelius
- Josefine Frida Pettersen
- Mads Sjøgård Pettersen
- Lita Prahl

== Q ==
- Pehr Qværnstrøm

== R ==
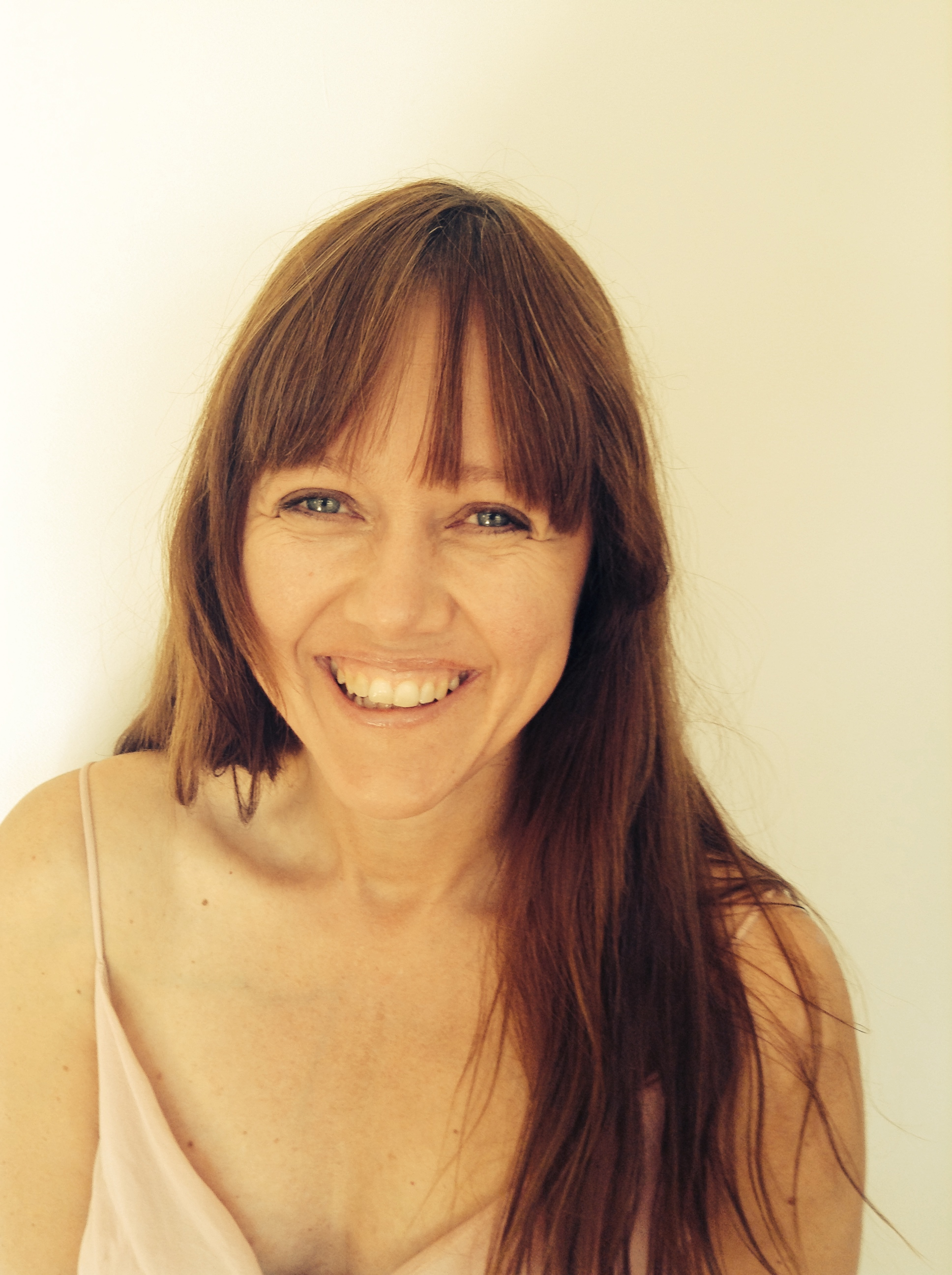
Iren Reppen

- Karen Randers-Pehrson
- Alf Ramsøy
- Bernhard Ramstad
- Rasmus Rasmussen
- Sophie Reimers
- Silje Reinåmo
- Helge Reiss
- Tom Remlov
- Iren Reppen
- Georg Richter
- Kristine Riis
- Knut Risan
- Frank Robert
- Margarete Robsahm
- Einar Rød
- Ingolf Rogde
- Jan Gunnar Røise
- Birgitte Cornelia Rojahn
- Tutta Rolf
- Katie Rolfsen
- Siri Rom
- Einar Rose
- Morten Rudå
- Amund Rydland
- Anne Ryg
- Inger Lise Rypdal

== S ==
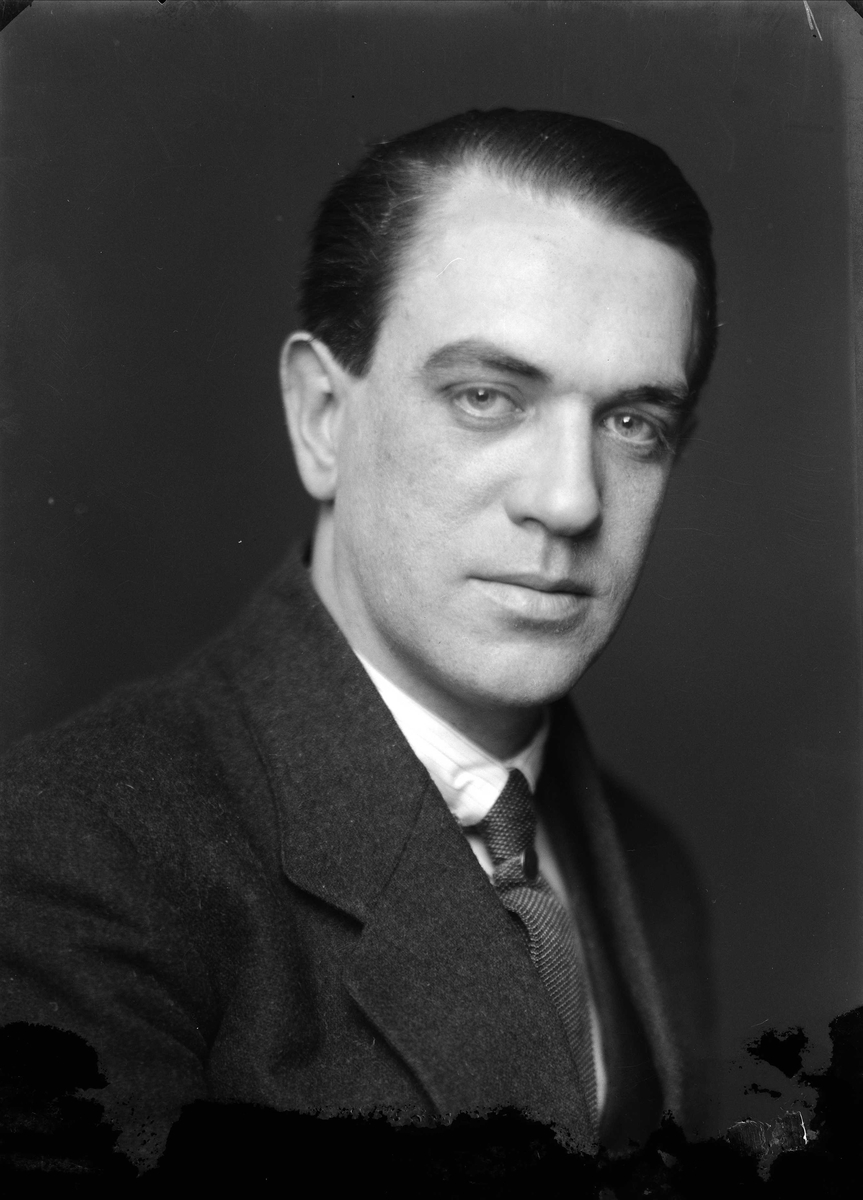
Eugen Skjønberg

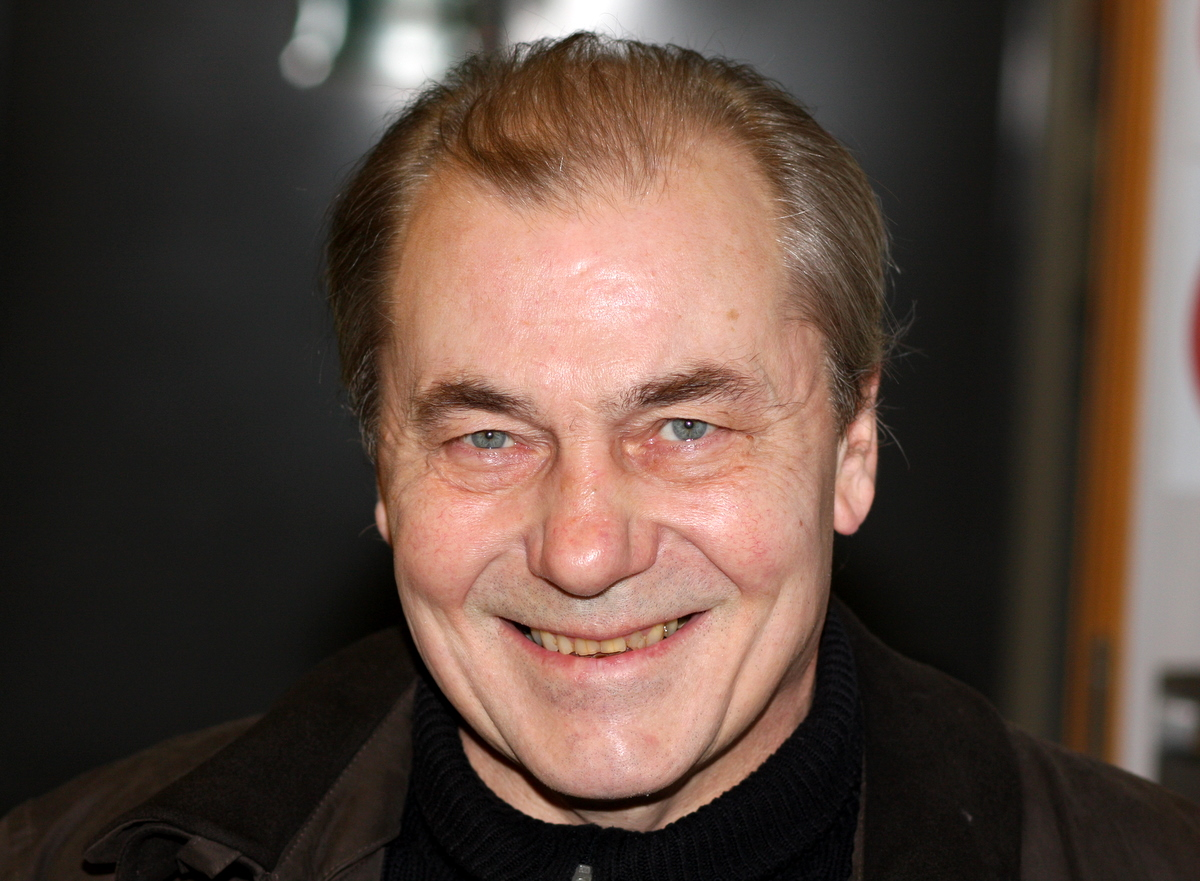
Bjørn Sundquist

- Andrine Sæther
- Egil Sætren
- Steinar Sagen
- Tore Sagen
- Fridtjov Såheim
- Bjørn Sand
- Rolf Sand
- Vidar Sandem
- Toralf Sandø
- Tobias Santelmann
- Julia Schacht
- Ingolf Schanche
- Guri Schanke
- Svein Scharffenberg
- Kristopher Schau
- Agnethe Schibsted-Hansson
- Erik A. Schjerven
- Aud Schønemann
- August Schønemann
- Erna Schøyen
- Hege Schøyen
- Ragnar Schreiner
- Augusta Schrumpf
- Astrid Schwab
- Tone Schwarzott
- Harald Schwenzen
- Tore Segelcke
- Trond Espen Seim
- Sissel Sellæg
- Ågot Gjems Selmer
- Jens Selmer
- Liv Uchermann Selmer
- Ulf Selmer
- Ingebjørg Sem
- Mikkel Bratt Silset
- Ellen Sinding
- Karin Simonnæs
- Kari Simonsen
- Einar Sissener
- Stian Barsnes Simonsen
- Olga Sjøgren
- Linn Skåber
- Bjørn Skagestad
- Gunnar Skar
- Hugo Mikal Skår
- Jenny Skavlan
- Espen Skjønberg
- Eugen Skjønberg
- Henny Skjønberg
- Pål Skjønberg
- Christian Skolmen
- Jon Skolmen
- Nils Sletta
- Eva Sletto
- Augusta Smith
- Rolf Søder
- Alfred Solaas
- Astrid Sommer
- Botten Soot
- Reidar Sørensen
- Hans Ola Sørlie
- Kirsten Sørlie
- Kirsti Sparboe
- Lene Cecilia Sparrok
- Robert Sperati
- Thea Stabell
- Fredrik Steen
- Harald Steen
- Harald Heide Steen
- Liv Steen
- Trulte Heide Steen
- Henriette Steenstrup
- Nanna Stenersen
- Linn Stokke
- Lisa Stokke
- Tor Stokke
- Robert Stoltenberg
- Dennis Storhøi
- Guri Stormoen
- Hans Stormoen
- Harald Stormoen
- Kjell Stormoen
- Gisle Straume
- Julian Strøm
- Per Sunderland
- Gunnhild Sundli
- Bjørn Sundquist
- Ivar Svendsen
- Kari Svendsen
- Arne Svendsen
- Sigrun Svenningsen

== T ==
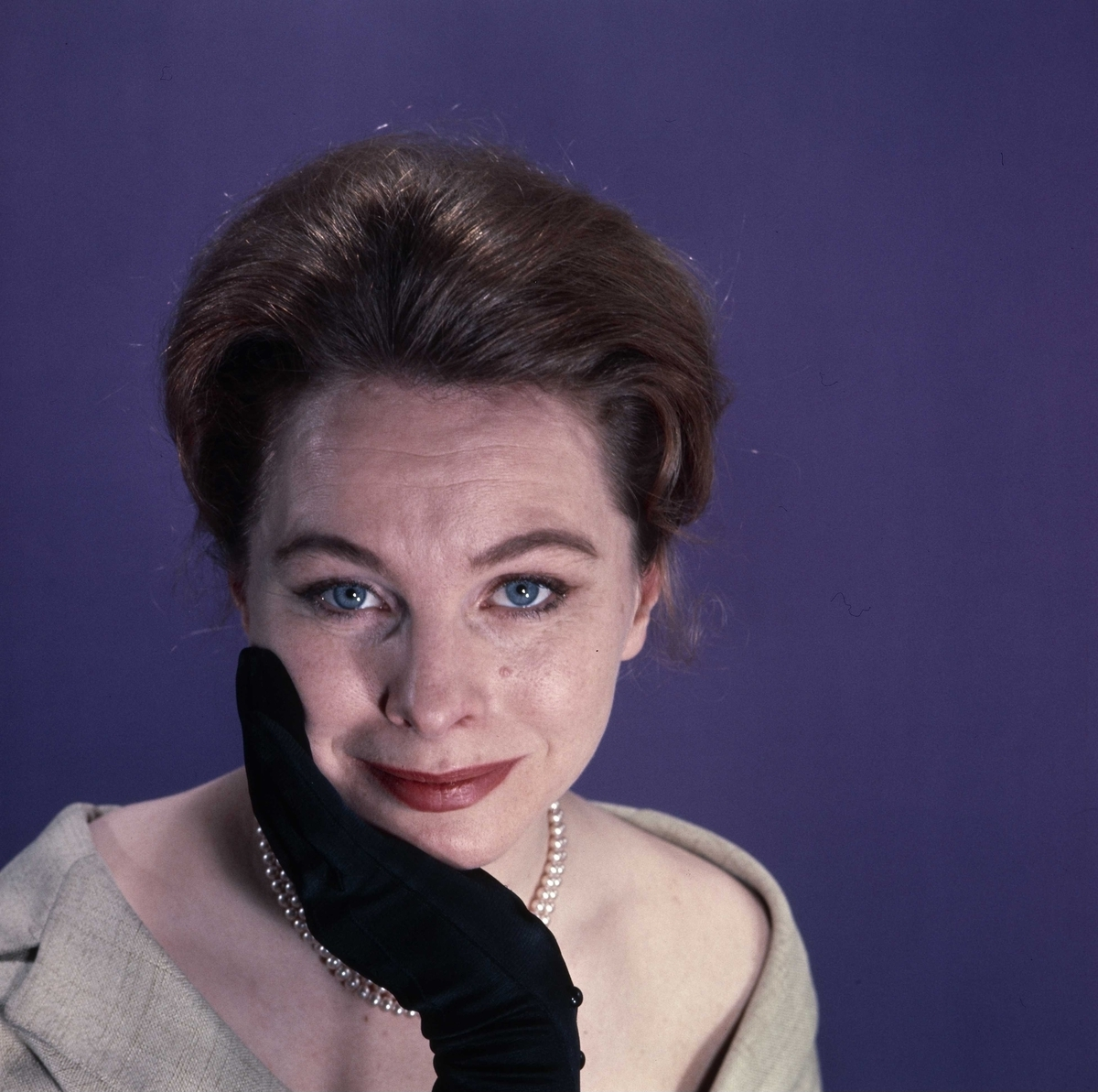
Rut Tellefsen

- Marie Takvam
- Kadir Talabani
- Lisa Teige
- Bjørnar Teigen
- Rut Tellefsen
- Tom Tellefsen
- Rune Temte
- Anita Thallaug
- Knut Thomassen
- Thomas Thomassen
- Børt-Erik Thoresen
- Liv Thorsen
- Axel Thue
- Svein Tindberg
- Pia Tjelta
- Bjarte Tjøstheim
- Gunnar Tolnæs
- Herman Tømmeraas
- Asbjørn Toms
- Lisa Tønne
- Trond-Viggo Torgersen
- Unni Torkildsen
- Ane Dahl Torp
- Silje Torp
- Einar Tveito
- Lars Tvinde

== U ==
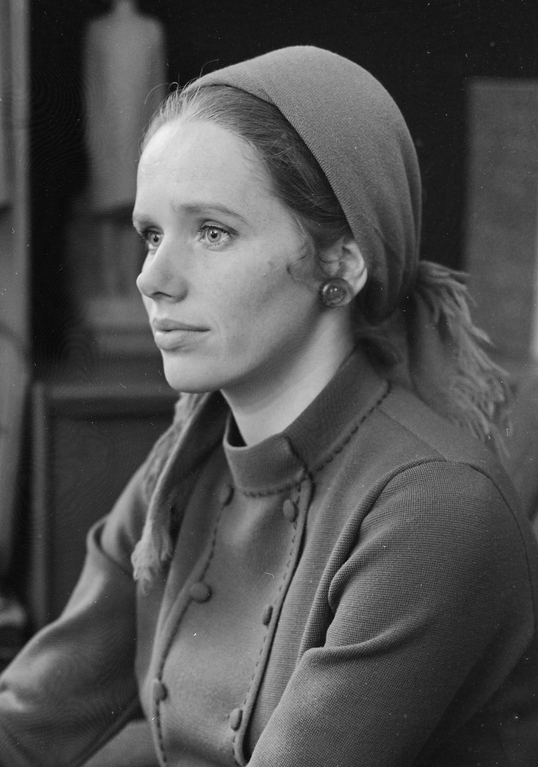
Liv Ullmann

- Erik Ulfsby
- Liv Ullmann
- Nils Utsi

== V ==
- Einar Vaage
- Dag Vågsås
- Ingerid Vardund
- Line Verndal
- Nils Vogt
- Jan Voigt
- Johanne Voss

== W ==
- Gudrun Waadeland
- Sølvi Wang
- Ulf Wengård
- Rolv Wesenlund
- Ragna Wettergreen
- Stub Wiberg
- Ottar Wicklund
- Claus Wiese
- Knut Wigert
- Sonja Wigert
- Ingrid Øvre Wiik
- Øystein Wiik
- Ryan Wiik
- Sverre Wilberg
- Odd-Magnus Williamson
- Liv Wilse
- Stein Winge
- Viktoria Winge
- Carsten Winger
- Lucie Wolf
- Emmy Worm-Müller

== Y ==
- Bård Ylvisåker
- Vegard Ylvisåker

== Z ==
- Vera Zorina
