= ...But the Olsen Gang Wasn't Dead =

...men Olsenbanden var ikke død
- Directed by: Knut Bohwim
- Written by: Knut Bohwim; Gustav Kramer
- Starring: Arve Opsahl; Carsten Byhring; Sverre Holm; Aud Schønemann
- Release date: 1984
- Running time: 89 minutes
- Country: Norway
- Language: Norwegian

...men Olsenbanden var ikke død (...But the Olsen Gang Wasn't Dead) is a 1984 Norwegian comedy-crime film, directed by Knut Bohwim. It is the last installment of the original Olsenbanden-films starring Opsahl, Holm, and Byhring. It was released on September 6, 1984.

== Plot ==
The gang is residing on a luxury yacht in Monte Carlo in Monaco. They live rich lives and everything is happiness until their old friend, Biffen appears below their yacht with scuba gear. He climbs aboard when everybody is downstairs in the cabin and steals the suitcase containing the money. When Egon is about to pay for the luxuries, he discovers the money is gone, and cannot pay. Then, it is back to Botsfengselet in Oslo.

Two years later, when he is released, he finds that Valborg is painting art. Benny gets an idea, and they decide to break into the Munch Museum. Valborg is painting Munch paintings, and they look very real. The gang decides to secretly switch the Munch originals with Valborg's paintings and then sell them to France.

Unaware, Valborg gets the same idea. She then secretly switches back the Munch paintings with her own, apart from one painting, The Scream, and they are where they started, without either knowing anything.

They steal some tickets and travel to Nice. There, art enthusiast and collector Cap Cheval (played by Per Tofte) greets them and is overwhelmed to see a real Munch painting, The Scream. Valborg tells Cheval she has over 130 more pictures at home, and Cap tells them to leave. He then calls his paint and art seller comrade in Oslo, Hanssen. Hanssen tells the thug Biffen, to break into Kjell and Valborg's place to steal pictures, but eventually, Hanssen discovers they are false and leaves angrily.

They arrange a meeting with Cap Cheval outside the Trinity Church in Oslo to swap money with art. As fate would have it, their old friend Hermansen, the police superintendent, is conducting a pornography raid in a nearby video store, and discovers them. Olsenbanden gets into their Toyota Corona and flees, while Cheval pursues them in his Peugeot 505. The police join the chase as well. When they pass through the area of Ila, an unmarked police car joins the pursuit.

As the chase continues at over 100 km/h in the streets of Oslo, two driving school cars also join the chase, for no reason. In the end, it is nearly 10 cars chasing each other through Oslo.

The chase, depicted as the wildest car chase in the history of the Olsenbanden-movies, ends outside Bislett Stadium, after driving in circles around a traffic island for a minute, when the tram suddenly shows up. The police car slams its brakes, and the camera shifts away and follows the tram, while subsequent crash noises can be heard in the background.

As all the ten cars crash, Cheval gets out of his car and leaves. Benny and Kjell leave silently as well, and the police catch up with Egon and arrest him. Hermansen, mistakes the Madonna-picture for pornographic material and rips the artwork to shreds. Egon is now, after 20 times in prison, sent to a place for mental illness for treatment, and eventually, to a retirement home.

== Cast ==
- Arve Opsahl as Egon Olsen
- Carsten Byhring as Kjell Jensen
- Sverre Holm as Benny
- Aud Schønemann as Valborg, Kjells kone
- Sverre Wilberg as Hermansen, kriminalbetjent
- Jon Skolmen as Vaktmesteren på Munchmuseet
- Knut Lystad as Securitasmann
- Ove Verner Hansen as Biffen
- Harald Heide-Steen Jr. as Dirigent for juriststudentene
- Johan Fillinger as Kunsthandler

== See also ==
- Olsenbanden tar gull (1972 film)
- Olsen Gang
