= Bredo =

Bredo is a given name. Notable people with the name include:

- Bredo Greve (1871–1931), Norwegian architect
- Bredo Greve (film director), Norwegian anarchist and filmmaker
- Bredo Henrik von Munthe af Morgenstierne (1851–1930), Norwegian jurist and Professor of Jurisprudence
- Bredo von Munthe af Morgenstierne (1701–1757), Norwegian-Danish civil servant and Supreme Court justice
- Svein Bredo Østlien (born 1943), Norwegian football midfielder
- Harald Bredo Sollie (1871–1947), Norwegian jurist, naval officer and politician
- Bredo Henrik von Munthe af Morgenstierne Sr. (1774–1835), Danish-Norwegian jurist, first Attorney General of Norway
- Adolf Bredo Stabell (1807–1865), Norwegian newspaper editor, banker and politician
- Adolf Bredo Stabell (diplomat) (1908–1996), Norwegian diplomat
- Bredo Wass (1903–1992), Norwegian footballer
