= Om kjærligheten synger de =

1946 film

- Directed by: Olav Dalgard
- Written by: Olav Dalgard
- Based on: Nicolay Huggenvik's play Om kjærligheten synger de
- Produced by: Nicolay Huggenvik
- Starring: Harald Heide Steen; Elisabeth Gording
- Cinematography: Reidar Lund
- Edited by: Olav Engebretsen
- Music by: Pauline Hall
- Distributed by: Oslo-Film A/S
- Release date: October 30, 1946
- Running time: 96 minutes
- Country: Norway
- Language: Norwegian

Om kjærligheten synger de (They Sing about Love) is a Norwegian film from 1946. It was directed by Olav Dalgard and starred Harald Heide Steen in the lead role. The film deals with poverty in Oslo in the 1930s. The film premiered at the Klingenberg Cinema on October 30, 1946.

== Cast ==
- Harald Heide Steen as Gustav Granbakken
- Elisabeth Gording as Maja Granbakken
- Stig Egede-Nissen as Måka
- Berit Brænne as Bella
- Alfred Solaas as Potten
- Finn Bernhoft as Larsen, a hotel owner
- Randi Baumann
- Edvard Drabløs as Stoffer
- Frithjof Fearnley as the judge
- Nils Hald as Drøbak
- Alfred Helgeby
- Bjarne Lindskog
- Dagmar Myhrvold as Mrs. Larsen
- Einar Rudaa as the mortgagor
- Ragnar Schreiner as Røden
- Aud Schønemann
- Erna Schøyen as Mathilde Evensrud
- Hans Stormoen as Gamlebåsen
- Knut Thomassen as the defense lawyer
- Lars Tvinde as Langeland, a pastor
- Einar Vaage as Beine
- Kåre Wicklund
