= 5 loddrett =

- Directed by: Nils Reinhardt Christensen
- Written by: Nils Reinhardt Christensen; Henki Kolstad
- Produced by: Jack Hald
- Starring: Henki Kolstad; Nanna Stenersen
- Cinematography: Sverre Bergli
- Edited by: Olav Engebretsen
- Music by: Egil Monn-Iversen
- Distributed by: Kommunenes filmcentral
- Release date: 17 August 1959
- Running time: 91 minutes
- Country: Norway
- Language: Norwegian

5 loddrett (5 Down) is a Norwegian comedy film from 1959. It was directed by Nils Reinhardt Christensen, who also wrote the script based on a concept by Lillebil Kjellén. The film was shot at the studio in Jar.

== Plot ==
Knut Jespersen (played by Henki Kolstad) is the manager of a record company. He wants to be a man about town, and one night he meets the seductive nightclub singer Anita Daae (Ingerid Vardund). His wife Randi (Nanna Stenersen) seeks advice from the architect Hans Falkenberg (Knut M. Hansson), and to win her man back she decides to change.

== Cast ==
- Henki Kolstad as Knut Jespersen, the manager of a record company
- Nanna Stenersen as Randi Jespersen, Knut's wife
- Ingerid Vardund as the nightclub singer Anita Daae
- Carsten Winger as Åge Møller, a store manager for A/S Grammofon
- Tore Foss as Colonel Falkenberg
- Knut M. Hansson as the architect Hans Falkenberg
- Joachim Holst-Jensen as Backer, the CEO for A/S Grammofon
- Jon Heggedal as Odd Jespersen, Knut and Randi's son
- Trulte Heide Steen as Mette Jespersen, Knut and Randi's elder daughter
- Elisabeth Hald as Tullemor Jespersen, Knut and Randi's younger daughter
- Ingrid Øvre Wiik as Miss Lyng, a cashier
- Øivind Bergh as a conductor
- Odd Borg as Åkerbø, a singer
- Sverre Wilberg as a butler
- Frithjof Fearnley as Pidden
- Per Skift as Jens
- Ulf Wengård as a rock singer
- Egil Åsman as a rock singer
- Egil Lorck as the angry customer
- Kari Simonsen as a young singer in the studio for an audition
- Helge Reiss as a salesman
- Liv Uchermann Selmer as a maid
- Ingeborg Cook as the ambitious mother

== Production ==
In the scene where Anita Daae meets Knut Jespersen for the first time, Ingerid Vardund wore a costume made by the Norwegian fashion designer William Duborgh Jensen. Sverre Wilberg made his film screen debut in this film. The roles of the two oldest children in the Jespersen family were played by Trulte Heide Steen and Jon Heggedal, who were both theater school students when the film was shot.

== Reception ==
After the premiere of the film at the Saga Cinema, it received four out of six stars from one reviewer. In his assessment, the reviewer found the topic (the wife over the sink and taking care of the children) a bit off-putting, stating "This is probably a problem that will disappear with the next generation, when our government's welfare policy has completely driven all married women into working life." When the film was broadcast on NRK television in 1974, parallels were drawn to the film Støv på hjernen, which was also from 1959.
