= Et øye på hver finger =

- Directed by: Nils Reinhardt Christensen
- Written by: Nils Reinhardt Christensen
- Based on: Ingeborg Storm's novel Et øye på hver finger
- Produced by: Bjarne Stokland
- Starring: Georg Løkkeberg; Trulte Heide Steen; Harald Heide Steen
- Cinematography: Sverre Bergli
- Edited by: Olav Engebretsen
- Music by: Egil Monn-Iversen
- Distributed by: Fotorama
- Release date: December 26, 1961
- Running time: 83 minutes
- Country: Norway
- Language: Norwegian

Et øye på hver finger (Keep Your Eyes Peeled) is a Norwegian comedy film from 1961 directed by Nils-Reinhardt Christensen. He also wrote the script for the film based on Ingeborg Storm's novel of the same name. The film stars Georg Løkkeberg, Trulte Heide Steen, and Harald Heide Steen.

== Plot ==
A new radar antenna codenamed R.A. 19 X is to be installed in a small garrison town on the Norwegian coast. The antenna is guarded by a group of soldiers. Three of them signed up for this task so they can play dance music at the Victoria Hotel when they are on leave. They are attracted to the colonel's daughter Maja, who is employed in the hotel's kitchen, but who has learned to handle joking men in uniform. Some hotel guests seem to be keeping a close eye on everything. A certain John Miller is in contact with the suspicious Bredesen, who has connections with people that show up in places where they have no business being. Dramatic, joking, and romantic scenes are played out on the rocks close to the military area.

== Cast ==
- Georg Løkkeberg as John Miller
- Trulte Heide Steen as Maja Allnes
- Harald Heide Steen as Colonel Allnes
- Tor Stokke as Arne Allnes, a lieutenant
- Sissel Juul as Minnie, a waitress
- Henki Kolstad as Director Anatol
- Carsten Winger as Bredesen
- Alf Malland as the dark gentleman in a black car
- Frithjof Fearnley as the man with a beard
- Per Rønningen as the man in a bathrobe
- Sverre Holm as the man in the armchair
- Anja Breien as the woman in bed
- Benyoucef Jacquesson as the voice on the radio telephone
- Sven Libaek as Helge, a member of the group The Windjammers
- Harald Tusberg as Hamlet, a member of the group The Windjammers
- Tim Gaunt as Hugo, a member of the group The Windjammers
- Nøste Schwab as Mrs. Allnes
- Anders Ljono as the principal
- Tore Foss as the general
- Torbjørn Lein as Gustav
- Kjetil Bang-Hansen as chair of the graduating class festivities
- Geir Sørnes Hansen as the boy with a slingshot
- Turid Balke as Fiffa
- Wenche Medbøe as Kari
- Aud Schønemann as the troublesome woman
- Britta Lech-Hanssen as Mrs. Neslund
- Randi Brænne as Madame
- Tom Remlov as Dag Allnes
- Erna Schøyen as Mrs. Matheus
- Pelle Bjørgan as the sergeant
- Henny Skjønberg as the hostess at Strandveien 104
- Erik Lassen as Mr. Svenson
