= Millionær for en aften =

- Directed by: Øyvind Vennerød
- Written by: Bent Christensen, Werner Hedmann, Jørn Ording, Øyvind Vennerød
- Produced by: Anne Vennerød
- Starring: Henki Kolstad; Unni Bernhoft; Willie Hoel
- Cinematography: Ragnar Sørensen
- Edited by: Øyvind Vennerød
- Music by: Maj Sønstevold
- Distributed by: Kommunenes Filmcentral
- Release date: August 18, 1960
- Running time: 86 minutes
- Country: Norway
- Language: Norwegian

Millionær for en aften (Millionaire for an Evening) is a Norwegian comedy film from 1960 directed by Øyvind Vennerød. It stars Henki Kolstad, Unni Bernhoft, and Willie Hoel. Jørn Ording and Vennerød arranged the screenplay, which was written by Bent Christensen and Werner Hedmann. It is an uncredited remake of the German film And Who Is Kissing Me? written by Friedrich Dammann and Herbert Rosenfeld.

== Plot ==
A shipowner is appointed to save a theater that is making a loss. A female ballet dancer thinks the shipowner is a journalist, and she asks him to play a shipowner to trick the theater director into putting on a play with her as the prima donna.

== Cast ==
- Henki Kolstad as the shipowner
- Unni Bernhoft as Maj Grønlien Granner, the prima donna
- Willie Hoel as the director of the Phoenix Theater
- Harald Aimarsen
- Arne Bang-Hansen as Rasmus Christian Frederik Bloch, the theater's commercial director
- Jon Berle as a dancer
- Kari Bjønnes as a dancer
- Reidar Bøe
- Lalla Carlsen as Maison Stella's proprietor
- Karin Dahl as a dancer
- Rolf Daleng as a dancer
- Andreas Diesen
- Kari Diesen
- Johannes Eckhoff
- Leif Enger
- Egil Hjorth-Jenssen
- Sverre Holm
- Joachim Holst-Jensen
- Topsy Irgens-Olsen as a dancer
- Anne-Lise Karstensen as a dancer
- Helge Krüger as a dancer
- Lothar Lindtner
- Gerd Mundal as a dancer
- Mette Møller as a dancer
- Grethe Nilsen as a dancer
- Arvid Nilssen as Wang-Knutsen, a review author
- Lillebil Kjellén
- Arve Opsahl as Knut Møller
- Sissel Ramberg as a dancer
- Egil Åsman as a dancer
- Rolf Sand
- Ingebjørg Sem
- Mette Marit Sem-Andersen as a dancer
- Jo Stang as a dancer
- Nanna Stenersen as Mrs. Hammer, a boarding house operator
- Hanne Thorstensen as a dancer
- Ulf Wengård
- Carsten Winger
