= Elvik =

Elvik is a surname. Notable people with the surname include:

- Åsa Elvik (born 1979), Norwegian politician
- Kjersti Elvik (born 1969), Norwegian actress
