= Anne Marit Jacobsen =

Norwegian actress (born 1946)

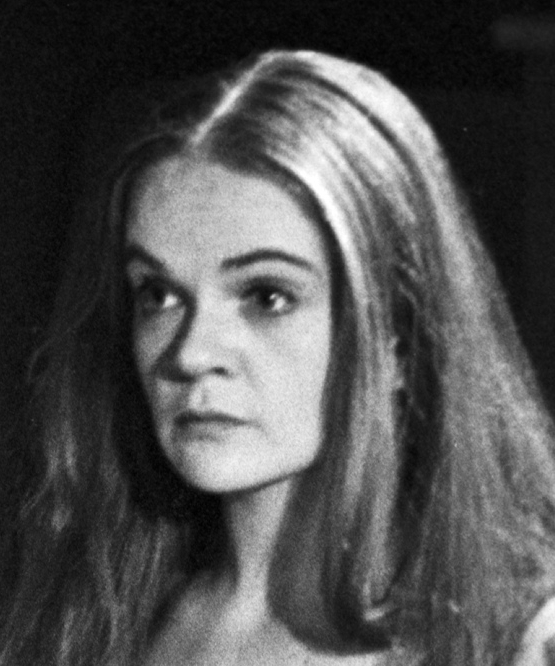
- Jacobsen in 1972
- Born: 7 November 1946 (age 78); Oslo, Norway
- Occupation: Actress
- Parent: Randi Heide Steen
- Relatives: Harald Heide Steen (uncle); Kari Diesen (aunt); Harald Heide-Steen Jr. (cousin); Andreas Diesen (cousin)
- Awards: Komiprisen; Gullruten; Amanda Award; Order of St. Olav

Anne Marit Jacobsen (born 7 November 1946) is a Norwegian stage and film actress, as well as voice actress.

== Biography ==
Jacobsen was born in Oslo to sculptor Thorbjørn Sigurd Jacobsen and opera singer Randi Heide Steen. She is the cousin of actress and singer Trulte Heide Steen. She has been assigned to the National Theatre in Oslo since 1970, and has also participated in revue, television and film. Among her films roles are the title characters in the 1972 film Marikkens bryllup, Rakel Iversen in the 1980 film Den som henger i en tråd, and "Aunt Petra" in the 1998 film Ole Aleksander Filibom-bom-bom. She was a central actress in the award-winning television show Hilde? På TV?! at the 1986 Montreux film festival. She played the leading character "Anna Nedrebø" in the television series Vestavind in 1994/1995, and was awarded the Gullruten award for best actress in 2006, for her role in the television series Sejer. Other awards include the Per Aabel Honorary Award (1997), Komiprisen (2003) and the Amanda Honorary Award (2016). She was decorated Commander of the Order of St. Olav in 2017.

Jacobsen has also worked as voice actress. Jacobsen has dubbed among others Wardrobe (Beauty and the Beast), Lady (Lady & the Tramp), Muriel Bagge (Courage the Cowardly Dog) and Gussie Mausheimer (An American Tail).
