= Rolf Berntzen =

Norwegian actor

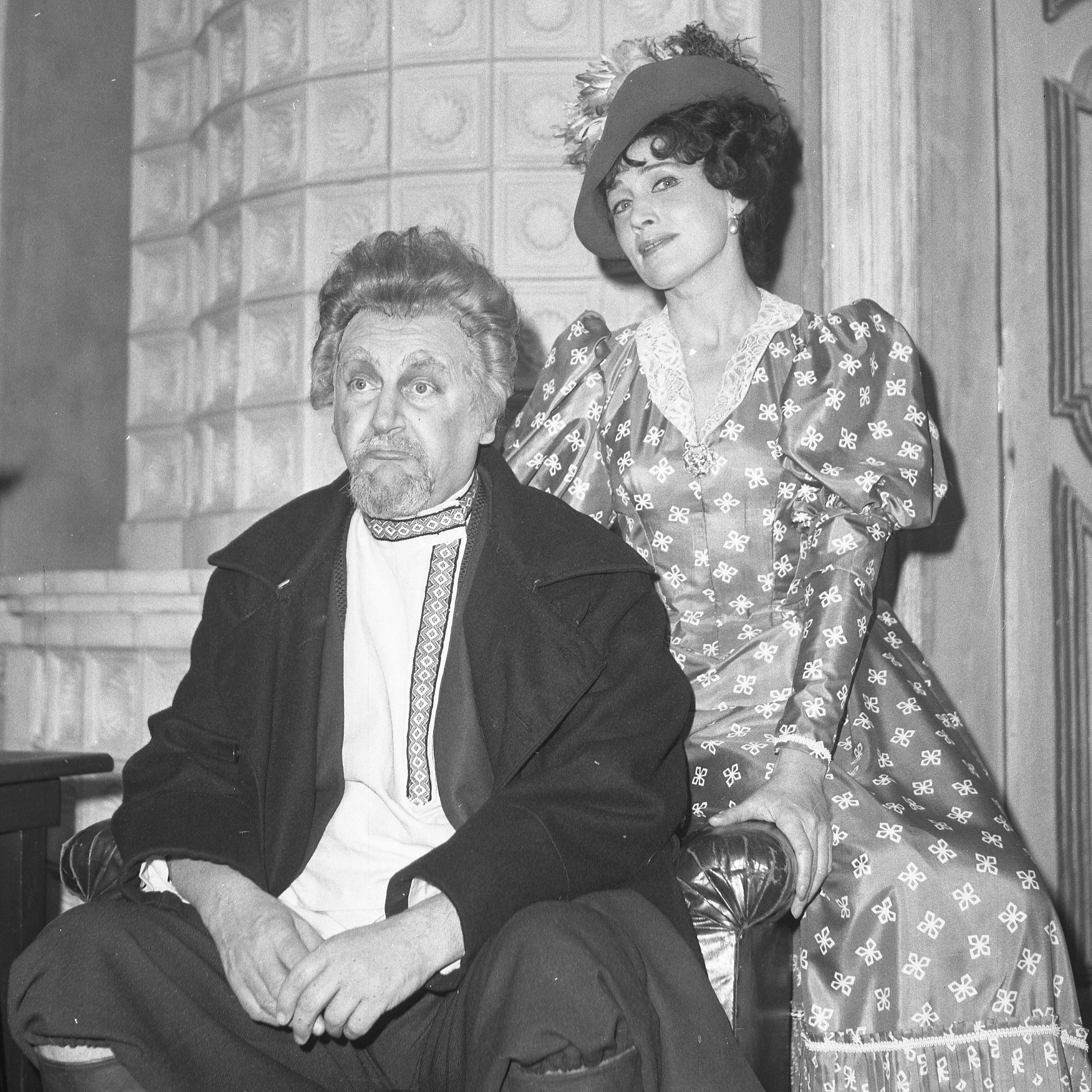
- Born: 4 June 1918
- Died: 22 September 2005 (aged 87)
- Spouse(s): Karin Simonnæs
- Awards: King's Medal of Merit in Gold (1968)

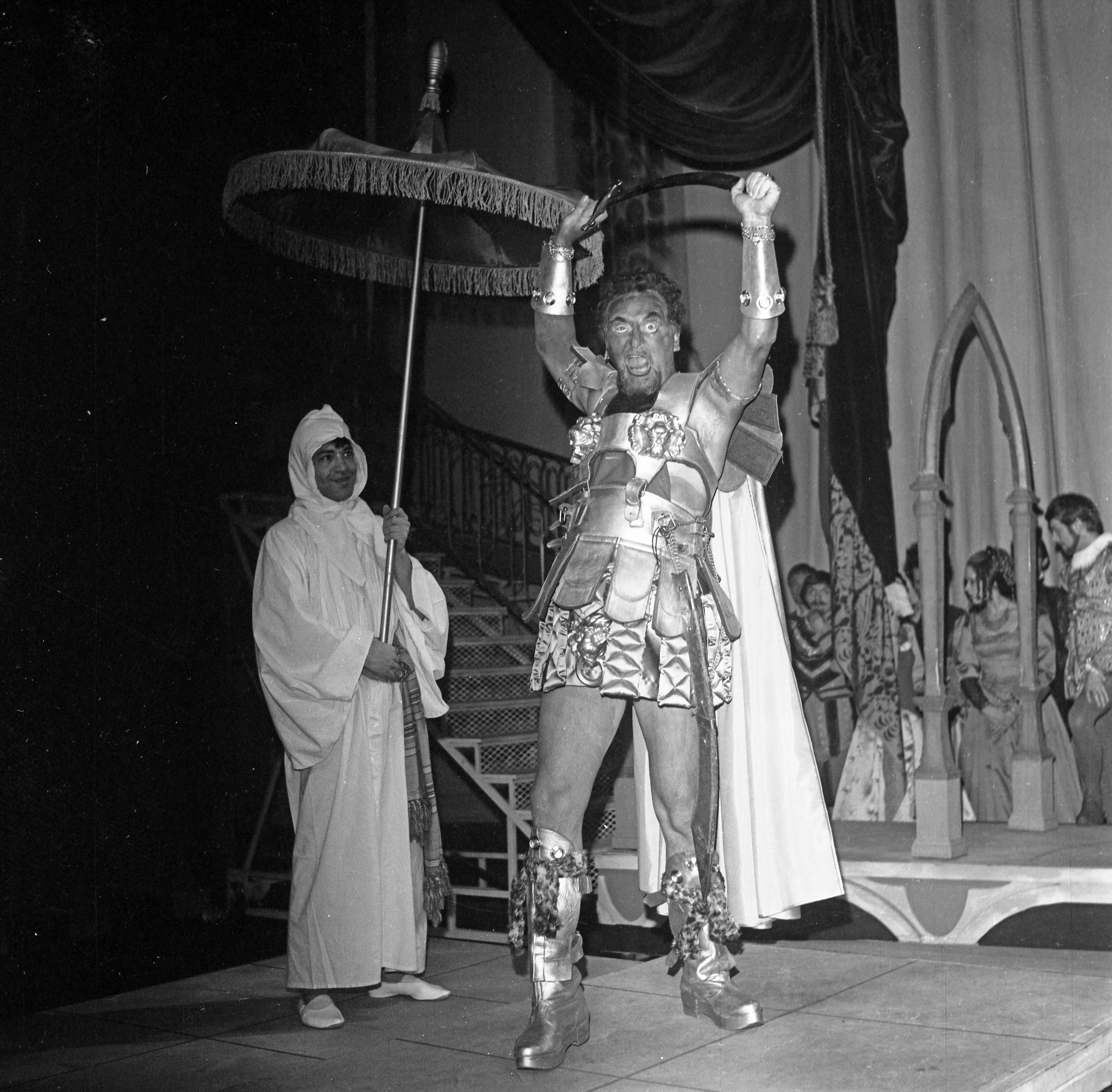
Rolf Berntzen as the Prince of Morocco in Shakespeare's The Merchant of Venice at Den Nationale Scene in Bergen, 1969.

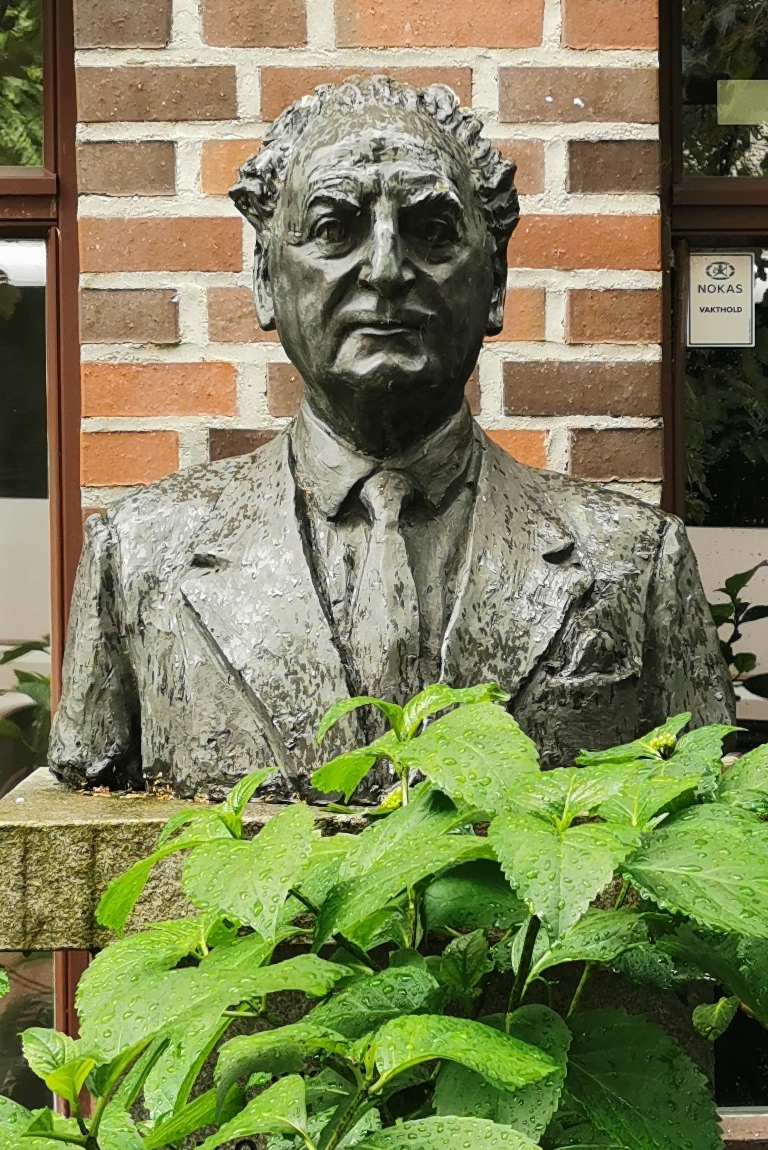
Rolf Berntzen Statue at Radisson Blu Hotel Bergen

Rolf Johannes Berntzen (4 June 1918 – 22 September 2005) was a Norwegian actor, and the grandfather of the Norwegian musician Julian Berntzen.

He was born in Bergen, co-founded Bergens Dramatiske Klubb in 1939, made his debut at Den Nationale Scene in 1941 and was officially hired there in 1943. He stayed at Den Nationale Scene for his entire career, except for an intermezzo at the National Theatre from 1963 to 1964. He also guested Det Norske Teatret, Oslo Nye Teater, Trøndelag Teater and Rogaland Teater. He retired in 1985, but continued acting sporadically as a pensioner. His last performance was in 1996. He also had small roles in films.

In 1947 he married actress Karin Simonnæs (1924–1984). He was decorated as Knight, First Class of the Royal Norwegian Order of St. Olav in 1979. He died in September 2005.
