= The Passionate Demons =

1961 film

- Directed by: Nils Reinhardt Christensen
- Written by: Nils Reinhardt Christensen; Axel Jensen
- Produced by: Sverre Gran
- Starring: Margarete Robsahm
- Cinematography: Ragnar Sørensen
- Edited by: Olav Engebretsen
- Music by: Egil Monn-Iversen
- Release date: 13 October 1961
- Running time: 90 minutes
- Country: Norway
- Language: Norwegian

The Passionate Demons (Norwegian: Line) is a 1961 Norwegian drama film directed by Nils Reinhardt Christensen. It was entered into the 1961 Cannes Film Festival.

The score was written by Egil Monn-Iversen.

== Cast ==
- Margarete Robsahm - Line
- Toralv Maurstad - Jacob
- Henki Kolstad - Gabriel Sand
- Sissel Juul - Hanne
- Elisabeth Bang - Jacob's Sister
- Rønnaug Alten - Jacob's Mother
- Truuk Doyer - A Passionate Demon
- Rolf Søder - Benna
- Rolf Christensen - Jacob's Father
- Atle Merton - Laffen
- Per Lillo-Stenberg - Jeno
- Ragnhild Hjorthoy - Ellen
- Per Christensen - Putte
- Odd Borg - Kalle
- Ulf Wengård - Pål
- Frithjof Fearnley - Line's father
- Wenche Medbøe - Veslemøy
- Olava Øverland - A passenger
