= Ulf Wengård =

Norwegian actor

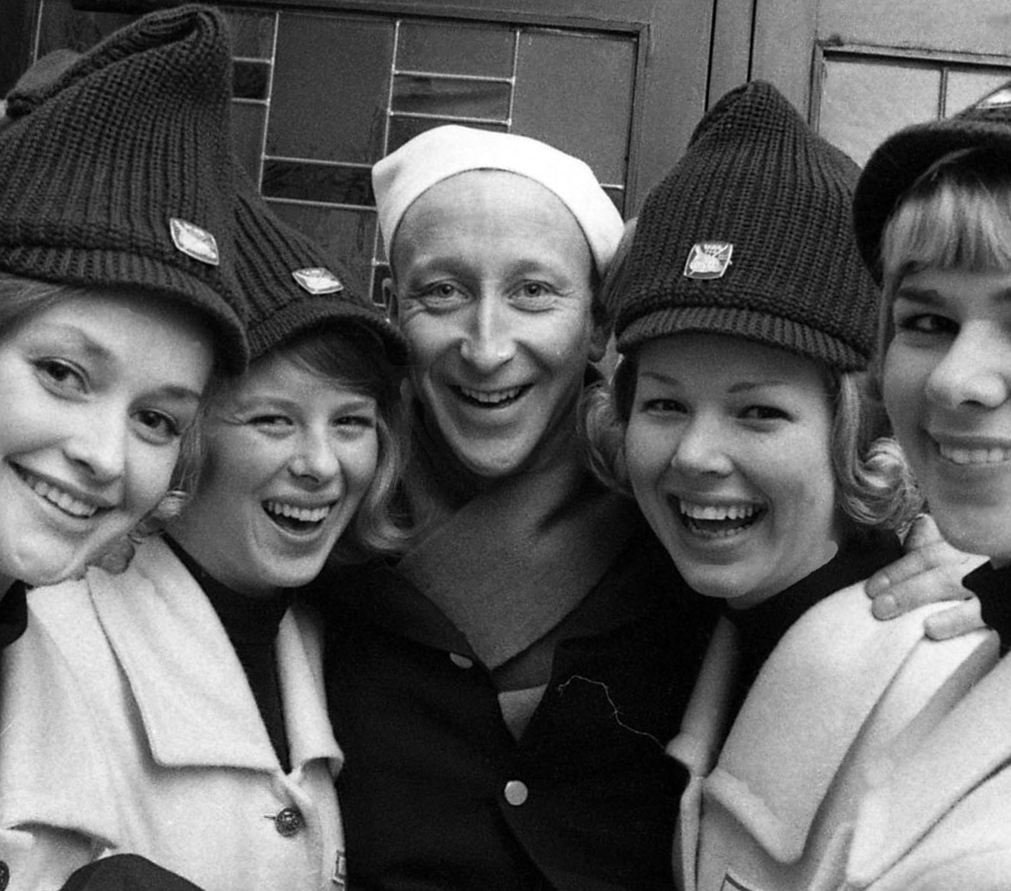
- Ulf Wengård (center)
- Born: January 15, 1927; Oppegård, Norway
- Died: July 7, 2003 (aged 76); Norway
- Occupation: Actor

Ulf Wengård (Januar 15, 1927 – July 7, 2003) was a Norwegian actor. He was known for his comedy roles, and he appeared in many of the Olsen Gang films.

Wengård's father was a cinema engineer in Oppegård. Wengård made his debut at the Studio Theater in the 1940s, participated in the New Norwegian Ballet, and studied jazz dance at the June Taylor Academy of Dance in the United States and Fred Astaire's Ballroom School. He was engaged at Chat Noir and the People's Theater. From 1954 onward he appeared in more than a hundred roles at the Oslo New Theater, including The White Horse Inn (Norwegian title: Sommer i Tyrol) and as Snoopy in You're a Good Man, Charlie Brown (Norwegian title: Knøttene). He played the role of Jamie in My Fair Lady in the 1960s, appearing alongside Helge Reiss and Henki Kolstad. At the premiere party, he danced with Ingrid Bergman. Other roles were Tim in På tokt med Mathilde and the Scarecrow in the musical Trollmannen fra Oz (The Wonderful Wizard of Oz).

Wengård stood out as an actor because he often insisted on having the smallest role in a production. At the Oslo New Theater, he followed this goal to the letter. This was because he thought extras were easily overlooked in a production, and he wanted to give a role with few lines as much artistic fullness as a supporting main role. According to Henki Kolstad, he did not want roles with more than ten lines. As a result, he became the self-appointed leader of the Norwegian Small Role Association (Norwegian: Norsk Smårolleforbund), and in this capacity he applied for the position of head of broadcasting at NRK after Einar Førde.

Wengård created his postman role for NRK's Barne-TV in the 1960s, in the children's program Kosekroken, where he played opposite tante Ragne (Aunt Ragne, played by Ragne Tangen) and vaktmesteren (the janitor, played by Svein Byhring). In 1968, Wengård had a hit with "Tannpussevise" (The Toothbrush Song), which was sung by the postman, with the lyrics Det blir ikke hull i en tann som er ren, / og tennene de pusser vi jo en etter en. / Og godteri spiser vi bare til fest, / sånn en gang i uka er best. Det er flaut, det er flaut, det er flaut, flaut, flaut / å bare kunne tygge graut (There will be no holes in a tooth that is clean, / And we brush the teeth one by one. / And we only eat sweets for parties, / So once a week is best. / It's embarrassing, it's embarrassing, it's embarrassing, embarrassing, embarrassing / To just be able to chew porridge). Wengård reprised the role of the postman in the children's television show Jul i Skomakergata in 1979 and sporadically over the years that followed.

Wengård sat on the press committee for the Holmenkollen Ski Festival for over 40 years. For his volunteer work in the press tribune, he received the Ski Association's plaque of honor. In 1997, he received the King's Medal of Merit in silver.

== Filmography ==
- 1959: 5 loddrett
- 1960: Millionær for en aften
- 1961: Bussen
- 1961: Line
- 1962: Operasjon Løvsprett
- 1969: Operasjon Egon as a boy
- 1970: Balladen om mestertyven Ole Høiland
- 1970: Olsenbanden og Dynamitt-Harry as Harry's apprentice
- 1973: To fluer i ett smekk
- 1974: Knutsen & Ludvigsen
- 1975: Glade vrinsk
- 1976: Olsenbanden for full musikk as Constable Blom
- 1977: Olsenbanden & Dynamitt-Harry på sporet as the travel agency clerk
- 1977: Toget (TV)
- 1978: Olsenbanden + Data Harry sprenger verdensbanken as the taxi driver
- 1979: Jul i Skomakergata (TV series) as the postman
- 1981: Olsenbanden gir seg aldri as the travel agency clerk
- 1982: For Tors skyld
- 1982: Olsenbandens aller siste kupp as the life insurance agent at Høye Nord
- 1984: ...men Olsenbanden var ikke død as Constable Blom
- 1986: Vill, Villere, Villaveien (TV series, season 2) as Finn
- 1988: Fleksnes fataliteter (TV series, episode:Rotbløyte)
- 1995: Amalies Jul (TV series) as Mr. Lerke Larsen
- 1995: Eggs
- 1996: Lillys butikk (TV series) as the postman
- 1999: Olsenbandens siste stikk as the guard with a dog
