= August Oddvar =

Norwegian stage actor

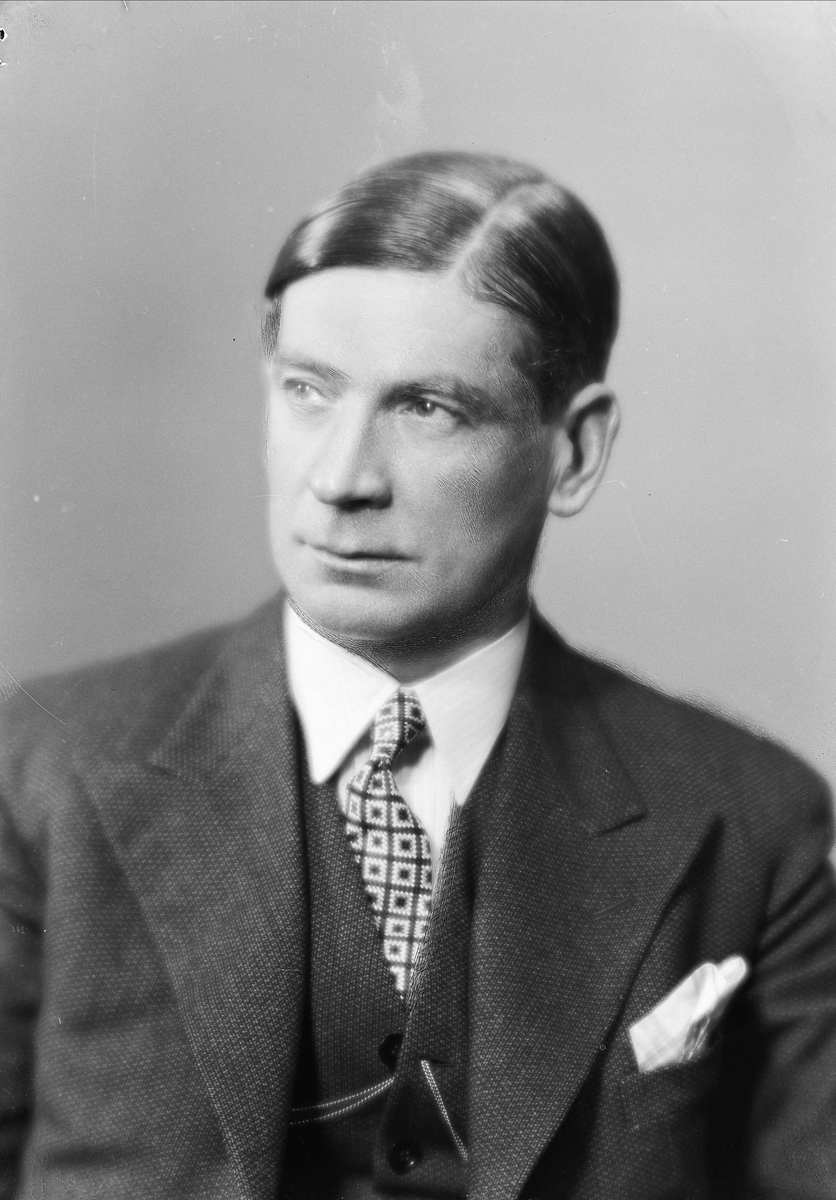
- August Oddvar in 1933; Photo by Ernest Rude
- Born: 1 August 1877
- Died: 17 March 1964 (aged 86)
- Occupation: Actor
- Awards: Order of St. Olav; Order of the Falcon

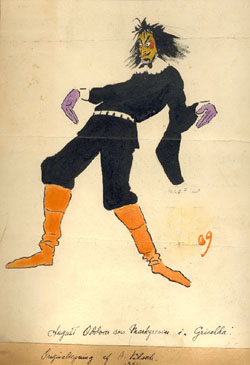
Oddvar August Drawing by Andreas Bloch

August Martinius Oddvar (1 August 1877 – 17 March 1964) was a Norwegian stage actor. He made his stage debut at the National Theatre in 1899, and played there all his career, which spanned sixty years.

He was appointed Knight, First Class of the Royal Norwegian Order of St. Olav in 1939, and Commander in 1956. He was Knight of the Icelandic Order of the Falcon.
