= Bredo Wass =

Norwegian footballer (1903-1992)

Personal information
- Date of birth: 15 February 1903
- Date of death: 2 February 1992 (aged 88)

International career
Years	Team	Apps	(Gls)
1926	Norway	1	(0)

Bredo Wass (15 February 1903 – 2 February 1992) was a Norwegian footballer. He played in one match for the Norway national football team in 1926.
