= Frank Robert =

Norwegian actor and singer (1918–2007)

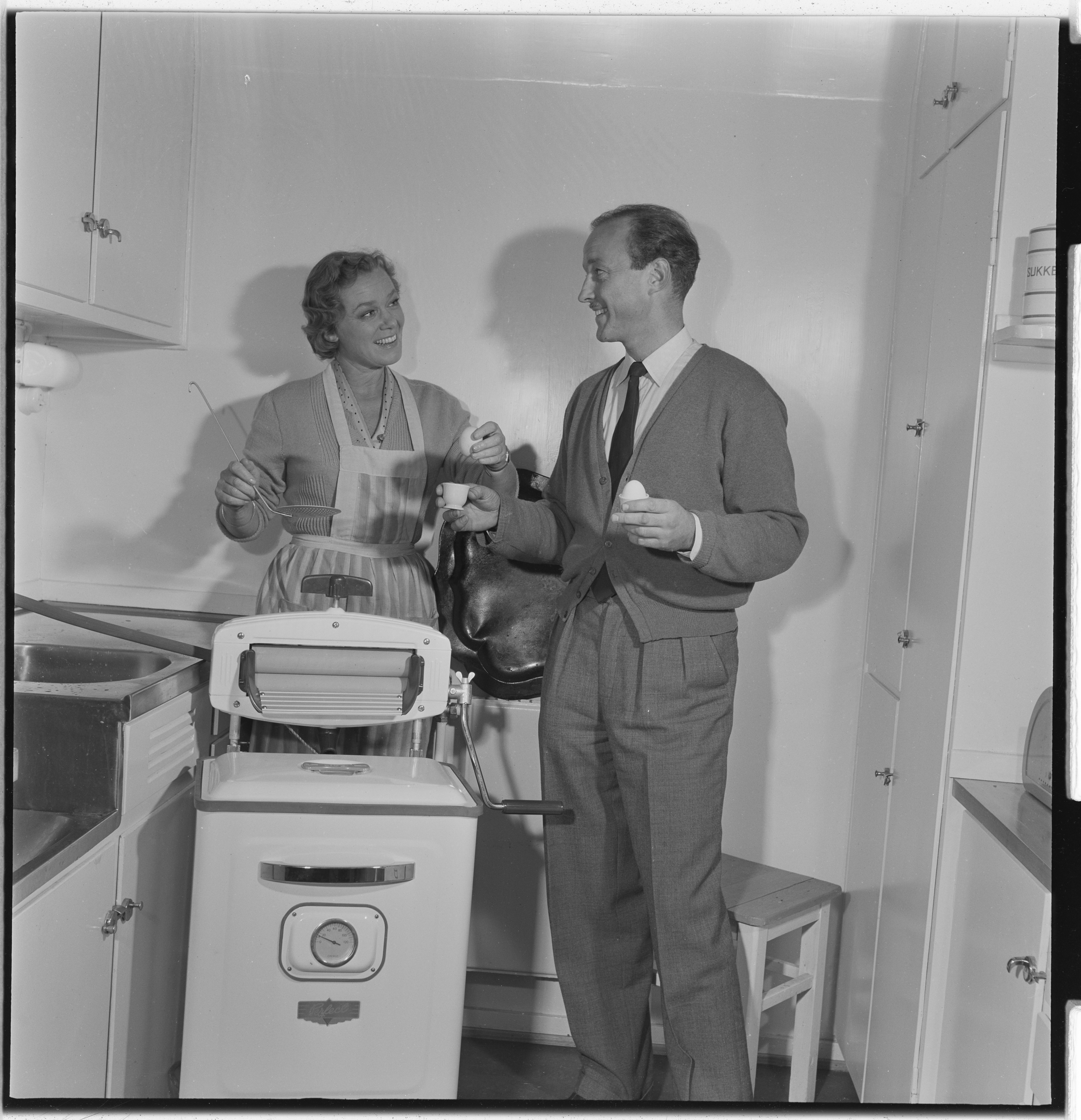
- Frank Robert in 1955, in a commercial together with his wife Randi Brænne
- Born: Frank Robert Olstad; 12 October 1918; Kristiania, Norway
- Died: 13 July 2007 (aged 88)
- Occupations: actor, dancer and singer
- Known for: title character in the popular audio play Dickie Dick Dickens
- Spouse: Randi Brænne

Frank Robert (né Frank Robert Olstad; 12 October 1918 – 13 July 2007) was a Norwegian singer, dancer and actor. He is particularly remembered for playing the title character in the popular audio play Dickie Dick Dickens.

== Personal life ==
Robert was born in Kristiania to engineer Ole Christian Olstad and Helene Elisabet Svensson. He was married to actress Randi Brænne, and a brother-in-law of Berit Brænne. Originally born Olstad, his second name Robert was upgraded to surname after an initiative from Chat Noir manager Johan Henrik Wiers-Jenssen.

== Career ==
Robert made his stage debut at the Carl Johan Theater in 1939. From 1941 he performed at the revue stage Chat Noir, and then at Centralteatret from 1944 to 1958. He was assigned with the Nationaltheatret from 1958 to 1962, and after a period at Oslo Nye Teater, again at Nationaltheatret from 1968 to 1988. At Nationaltheatret he played in comedies by Ludvig Holberg, Molière and Noël Coward. Among his Ibsen characters were "Krogstad" in A Doll's House, "Manders" in Ghosts, and "Begriffenfeldt" and "the button-molder" in Peer Gynt. He was awarded the Norwegian Theatre Critics Award in 1974 for the character "Gustav" in Strindberg's Creditors. He participated in thirteen films, including Trine from 1952, På solsiden from 1956, Fjols til fjells from 1957, Freske fraspark from 1963, and several of the Olsenbanden movies. He played the title role in the Norwegian version of the audio play series Dickie Dick Dickens, aired by Radioteatret. He voiced the puppet character "Reodor Felgen" in The Pinchcliffe Grand Prix from 1975. Among his song recordings are "På sykkeltur" from 1954, Thorbjørn Egner's children song "Bamsens Fødselsdag" from 1952, and Finn Bø's revue song "Gutten som har vaska seg".
