= Ingrid Øvre Wiik =

Norwegian actress (1918–1999)

- Born: June 23, 1918; Tromsdalen, Norway
- Died: June 10, 1999 (aged 80); Oslo, Norway
- Occupation: Actress

Ingrid Øvre Wiik (née Hansen, June 23, 1918 – June 10, 1999) was a Norwegian actress.

== Family ==
Ingrid Øvre Wiik was born in Tromsdalen, the daughter of Petter Hilmar Hansen (1884–1968) from Balsfjord Municipality and Ivanna Sofie Andreassen (1887–1970) from Andersdal, a village in Tromsø Municipality. They lived at the Øvre farm. She married Arne Marius Wiik (1914–1996) from Mysen in 1950.

== Career ==
Øvre Wiik made her stage debut at the Bjørnevik Theater as Lilly in Skjærgårdsflirt in 1943. There, among other roles, she later played Clara Eynsford-Hill in Pygmalion and Borghild Stordal in Kranes konditori. She debuted at the New Theater in 1947. In 1967 she received her first major role in Jean Anouilh's Eurydice at the New Theater, where she performed until 1967.

In the 1970s and 1980s, Øvre Wiik was engaged with the Norwegian Theater and the National Traveling Theater. In 1977 she played the title role in the world premiere of Gunvor Øwre's Marta at the Norwegian Theater. In addition to her theater performances, she worked as a film and television actress. Øvre Wiik made her screen debut in 1951 in Edith Carlmar's Skadeskutt, and she appeared in 24 film roles altogether from 1951 to 1993. Her last appearance was in the television miniseries Morsarvet.

== Filmography ==
- 1951: Skadeskutt as Miss Brun, a patient
- 1957: Slalåm under himmelen as Mrs. Berntsen, Riesing's neighbor
- 1958: I slik en natt as the nurse
- 1958: Ut av mørket
- 1959: Støv på hjernen as a housewife at the meeting
- 1959: Ung flukt as the social worker
- 1959: 5 loddrett as Miss Lyng, a cashier
- 1963: Frokostpause (TV)
- 1963: Kanutten og Romeo Clive (TV series)
- 1965: Stoppested (TV)
- 1966: Broder Gabrielsen as Miss Berge
- 1966: Lille Lord Fauntleroy (TV series)
- 1966: Kom tilbake, lille Sheba (TV)
- 1969: Himmel og helvete as Mrs. Lauritzen
- 1973: Et dukkehjem (TV)
- 1973: To fluer i ett smekk as a lady
- 1977: Lykkespill (TV series)
- 1980: Guro (TV series)
- 1981: Fleksnes fataliteter (TV series)
- 1982: Leve sitt liv as Elizabeth
- 1985: Adjø solidaritet as Eigil's mother
- 1987: Av måneskinn gror det ingenting (TV series)
- 1988: Polisen som vägrade ta semester (TV series)
- 1993: Morsarvet (TV series)
