= Harald Heide-Steen Jr. =

Norwegian actor, comedian and singer

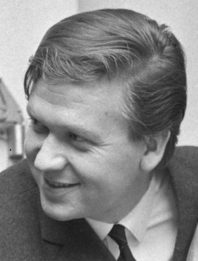
- Heide-Steen Jr. in 1965
- Born: Harald Heide-Steen Jr. 18 August 1939; Oslo, Norway
- Died: 3 July 2008 (aged 68); Oslo, Norway
- Occupations: Actor, comedian, jazz singer
- Years active: 1951–2008
- Spouse: Gullen Øyehaug
- Father: Harald Heide Steen
- Relatives: Trulte Heide Steen (sister)
- Website: Heide-Steen Jr. at Kjentfolk.no

Harald Heide-Steen Jr. (18 August 1939 – 3 July 2008) was a Norwegian actor, comedian and singer. He was the son of Harald Heide Steen and brother of actress and singer Trulte Heide Steen.

== Biography ==
During the 1960s, Heide-Steen Jr. made the radio programs Hørerøret, Sugerøret and Pusterøret at NRK with Gunnar Haugan and Rolv Wesenlund.

Heide-Steen Jr. is known for his acting role as Dynamitt-Harry in the Norwegian Olsenbanden-movies. He is also known as an improv-comic, often collaborating with Rolv Wesenlund in the late 1960s.

Heide-Steen Jr. attended Oslo Cathedral School, completing it in 1958, and started working at NRK in 1959.

== Selected filmography ==
- 1951: Kranes konditori as Justus
- 1951: Storfolk og småfolk as Ola, the son
- 1953: Skøytekongen
- 1968: Mannen som ikke kunne le
- 1970: Balladen om mestertyven Ole Høiland as Jacob Tengsereid
- 1970: Olsenbanden og Dynamitt-Harry as Dynamite-Harry
- 1975: Flåklypa Grand Prix
- 1976: Reisen til julestjernen as the Fool
- 1990: Herman
- 1994: Fredrikssons fabrik - The movie
- 1998 Karl & Co
- 1999: Olsenbandens siste stikk as Dynamite-Harry

== Discography ==
=== Solo albums ===
- 1970: Harald Synger Griseviser (Camp Records)
- 1978: Harald Heide Steen Jr. (Polydor Records)
- 1979: Av Riksturistsjef Johansen Annaler 1978/79 (Zarepta Records), with Totto Osvold
- 1985: Live At Gildevangen (Camp Records), as Sylfest Strutle
- 2008: Musikalske Minner (Big Box Records)

=== Collaborations ===
With Rolv Wesenlund

- 1968: Feriebiskop Fjertnes Slår Til Igjen! (Cappa Records)
- 1971: Hjertelig Tilstede (Cappa Records)
- 1979: Dagbladets Sommerkassett Alltid Foran (Dagbladet), with Ole Paus, Elsa Lystad and Anne-Karine Strøm
- 1980: Det Er Ingen Skam Å Snu - En Sports- Og Friluftsplate Av Geilokameratene (Zarepta Records), with Ole Paus
- 1980: Jeg Tror Folk Er Blitt Spenna Gærne (NorLP), with Ole Paus and Anne-Karine Strøm

Novel by Roald Dahl read by Harald Heide-Steen Jr.

- 2001: Georgs Magiske Medisin (NRK Lydbokforlaget)
