= Harald Heide Steen =

Norwegian actor

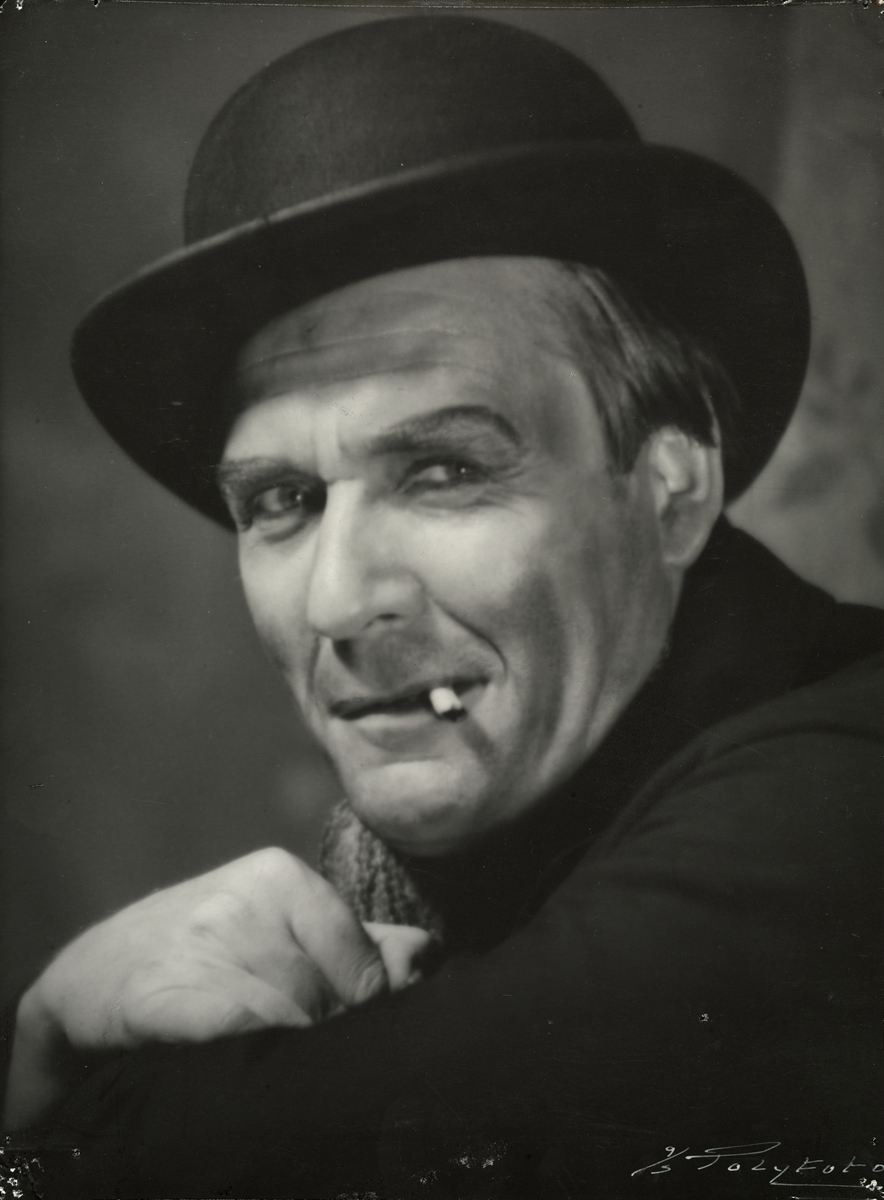
- Born: 11 January 1911; Kristiana, Norway
- Died: 3 January 1980 (aged 68); Oslo, Norway
- Other name: Harald Heide-Steen
- Occupation: Actor
- Years active: 1933–1977
- Children: Harald Heide-Steen Jr., Trulte Heide Steen
- Parents: Harald Martinius Steen (father); Signe Gunhilda Heide (mother)

Harald Heide Steen (11 January 1911 – 3 January 1980) was a Norwegian film actor, and son of Harald Martinius Steen and Signe Gunhilda Heide. He appeared in more than 30 films between 1933 and 1977. He was the father of actors and singers Harald Heide-Steen Jr. and Trulte Heide Steen.

== Partial filmography ==
- Vi som går kjøkkenveien (1933) - Jørgen Krogh
- Norge for folket (1936)
- Ungen (1938) - Julius
- Godvakker-Maren (1940) - Even
- Trysil-Knut (1942)
- Vigdis (1943) - Anders Moen, skogsarbeider
- Så møtes vi imorgen (1946) - Jørgen Berg
- Vi vil leve (1946) - Anders Moen
- Om kjærligheten synger de (1946)
- Jørund Smed (1948) - Ola
- Kranes konditori (1951) - Justus Gjør
- Storfolk og småfolk (1951) - Opsal
- Skøytekongen (1953) - Slåttan, skøytetrener
- Portrettet (1954) - Ola
- Det brenner i natt! (1955) - Tims barndomsvenn
- Hjem går vi ikke (1955)
- Toya (1956) - onkel Bjørn
- Salve sauegjeter (1958) - Salve, sauegjeter
- Toya & Heidi (1959) - Onkel Bjørn
- The Master and His Servants (1959) - Forsvareren
- Struggle for Eagle Peak (1960) - Æresrettens formann
- Veien tilbake (1960) - Direktør Stavik
- Petter fra Ruskøy (1960) - Onkel Bjørn
- Et øye på hver finger (1961) - Oberst Allnes
- Hans Nielsen Hauge (1961) - Bjørnstadboenden
- Nå gjør vi så...! (1962)
- Marenco (1964) - Kapteinen
- Ungen (1974) - Forsvareren
- Karjolsteinen (1977) - Didrik
