= Trulte Heide Steen =

Norwegian actress and singer

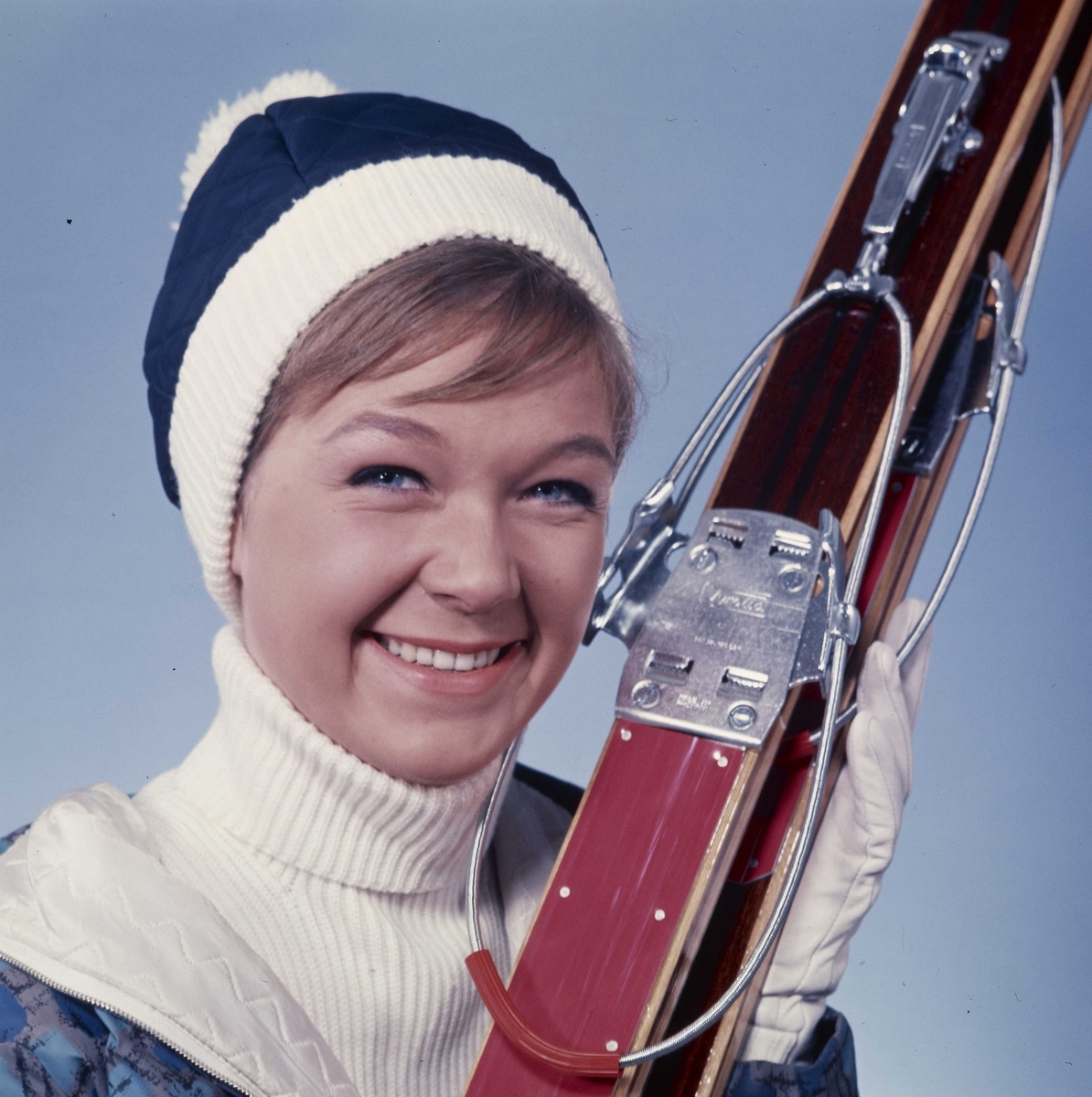
- Trulte Heide Steen, 1962
- Born: 1943; Oslo, Norway
- Occupation(s): Actress and singer
- Father: Harald Heide Steen
- Relatives: Harald Heide-Steen Jr.

Trulte Heide Steen (a.k.a. Anne Katrine Heide Steen, born 1943) is a Norwegian actress and singer.

== Family ==
Heide Steen is the daughter of the actor Harald Heide Steen, the sister of the actor Harald Heide-Steen Jr., and the cousin of the actress Anne Marit Jacobsen.

== Career ==
In addition to playing minor roles in films and TV series, Heide Steen started singing at the Lysthuset revue theater after Karin Krog returned to jazz singing. In 1979 she released the jazz album Smålåtfolket together with Dag Åkeson Moe. In 2003 she participated, together with her brother Harald Heide-Steen Jr., in NRK's Saturday game show Hodejegerne (The Headhunters).

== Filmography ==
- 1959: 5 loddrett as Mette Jespersen, Knut and Randi's elder daughter
- 1961: Et øye på hver finger as Maja Allnes
- 1968: De ukjentes marked

== Television ==
- 1966: Kontorsjef Tangen (series)
- 2003: Hodejegerne (game show)
