= Egil Åsman =

Norwegian actor

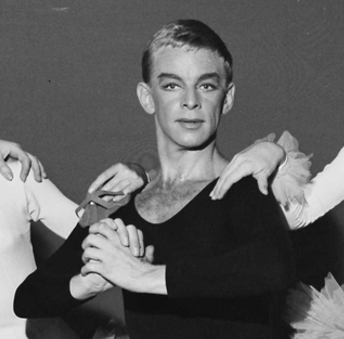
- Born: July 20, 1928
- Died: February 3, 1984 (aged 55)
- Occupation(s): Actor, dancer

Egil Åsman (July 20, 1928 – February 3, 1984) was a Norwegian actor and dancer.

In the 1950s he was engaged with the New Theater, the Norwegian Theater, the Edderkoppen Theater, the National Theater, and the People's Theater. From the 1960s to the 1980s, Åsman was primarily engaged with the Oslo New Theater. He also performed in a few film roles, as well as in NRK's Television Theater during its debut in 1954 in Olav Engebretsen's I moralens navn.

== Filmography ==
- 1954: I moralens navn as Fredrik
- 1959: 5 loddrett as a rock singer
- 1960: Millionær for en aften as a dancer
- 1965: Det angår ikke oss (TV)
- 1965: Equilibrium – Det er meg du skal elske as Roger
- 1969: 22. november - den store leiegården (TV) as a hairdresser
- 1969: I dag død, i morgen rosenrød (TV)
