= Sissel Juul =

Norwegian actress (1937–1987)

- Born: April 6, 1937; Oslo, Norway
- Died: July 19, 1987 (aged 40)
- Resting place: Vestre gravlund
- Occupation: Actress
- Spouse: Sverre Holm

Sissel Juul Holm (April 6, 1937 – July 19, 1987) was a Norwegian actress.

Juul made her film debut in 1961 in Line (The Passionate Demons), and she then appeared in Et øye på hver finger (1961) and Stompa, selvfølgelig! (1963). She also performed at the Edderkoppen Theater.

From 1963 until her death she was married to the actor Sverre Holm.

== Filmography ==
- 1961: Line as Hanne
- 1961: Et øye på hver finger as Minnie, a waitress
- 1963: Stompa, selvfølgelig! as Margaret, Tørrdal's sister
