= Frithjof Fearnley =

Norwegian actor (1896–1971)

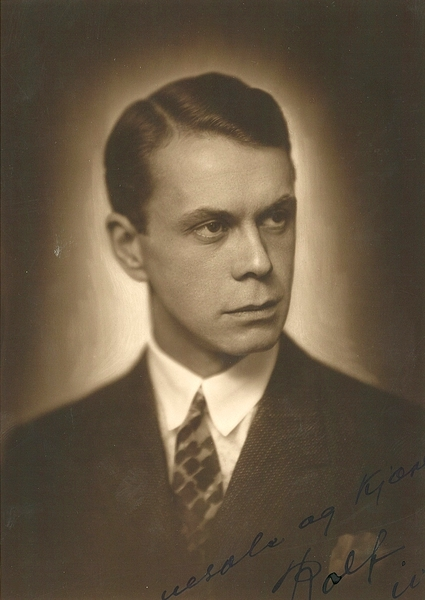
- Frithjof Fearnley in 1930
- Born: December 16, 1896; Kristiania (now Oslo), Norway
- Died: April 18, 1971 (aged 74)
- Occupation: Actor
- Spouse: Randi Brænne

Frithjof Fearnley (December 16, 1896 – April 18, 1971) was a Norwegian actor.

Fearnley was born in Kristiania (now Oslo). He debuted in 1920 in a traveling theater with Hauk Aabel and Harald Stormoen, and he later worked at Chat Noir, the Mayol Theater, the Casino Theater, the National Theater in Bergen, the Trøndelag Theater, the Central Theater, and the National Traveling Theater, and in a number of private traveling theaters. He performed extensively in lighter repertoire, but he also played Aegeus in Medea, Mephistopheles in Faust, and Professor Higgins in Pygmalion. He was also popular in comedy roles, such as Preben in På solsiden and the church servant Evensen in Den store barnedåpen. As an actor, he was active until shortly before his death. He was married to the actress Randi Brænne for a time.

== Filmography ==
- 1925: Fager er lien as Fredrik-August Reventlow, an estate owner
- 1933: En stille flirt as Mr. Wilder
- 1946: Om kjærligheten synger de as the judge
- 1949: Vi flyr på Rio as Helmer's father
- 1952: Det kunne vært deg as a sailor
- 1957: På slaget åtte as the judge
- 1958: Pastor Jarman kommer hjem
- 1959: 5 loddrett as Pidden
- 1961: Et øye på hver finger as the man with a beard
- 1961: Line as Line's father
- 1961: Bussen as Fjell-Olsen, a clerk
- 1961: Et øye på hver finger as the man with a beard
- 1968: Hennes meget kongelige høyhet
- 1970: Balladen om mestertyven Ole Høiland as the director at the Bank of Norway
