= Nils Reinhardt Christensen =

Norwegian film director

- Born: 13 April 1919; Skien, Norway
- Died: 8 November 1990 (aged 71)
- Occupations: Film director, screenwriter
- Years active: 1957–1969

Nils Reinhardt Christensen (13 April 1919 – 8 November 1990) was a Norwegian film director and screenwriter. He directed nine films between 1957 and 1969.

== Filmography ==
- 1957: Selv om de er små
- 1959: 5 loddrett
- 1961: Et øye på hver finger
- 1961: Line
- 1962: Stompa & Co
- 1963: Stompa, selvfølgelig!
- 1965: Stompa forelsker seg
- 1967: Stompa til Sjøs!
- 1969: Psychedelica Blues
