= Karin Simonnæs =

Norwegian actress (1924–1984)

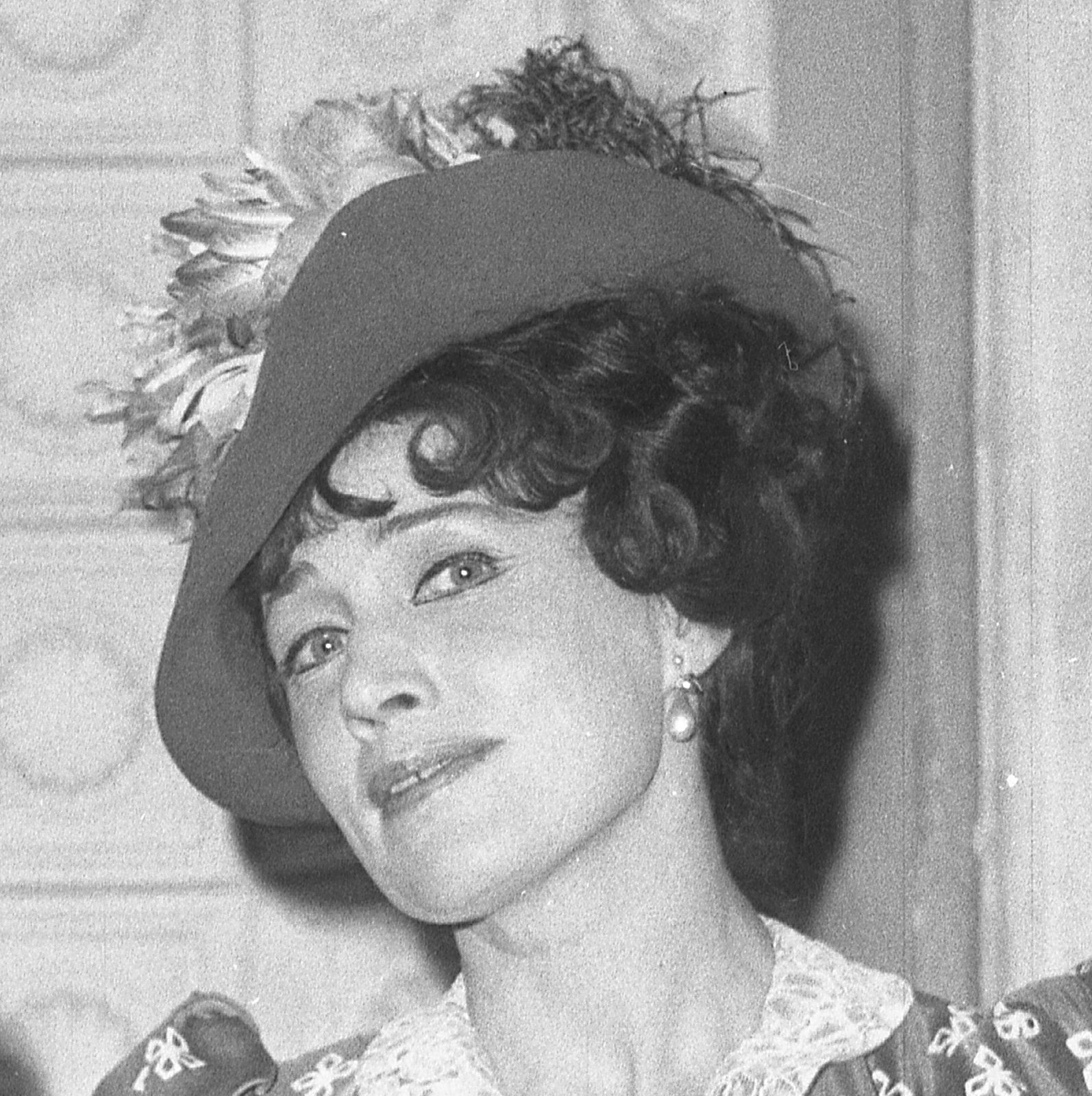
Simonnæs in 1968

Karin Simonnæs (24 June 1924– 8 November 1984) was a Norwegian actress.

She was born in Trondheim. Norway. She made her debut in 1945 at Den Nationale Scene in Bergen and was employed there until her death, except the years 1948 to 1950 when she worked at National Theatre in Oslo. She also worked at the Fjernsynsteatret department of the Norwegian Broadcasting Corporation. She was married to fellow actor Rolf Berntzen from 1947.
