= Randi Brænne =

Norwegian actress (1911–2004)

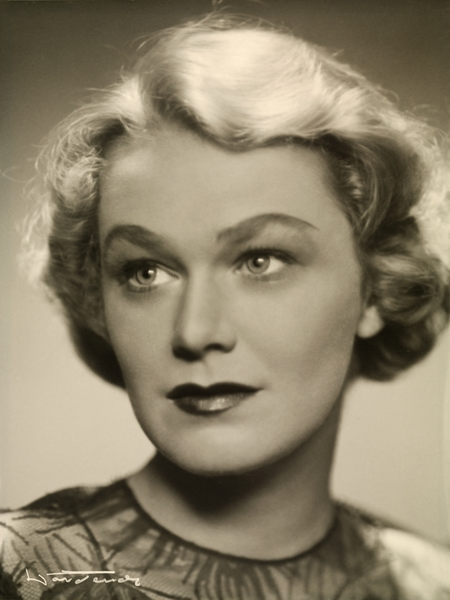
- Randi Brænne, c. 1935
- Born: 26 May 1911; Kristiania, Norway
- Died: 1 June 2004 (aged 93)
- Occupation: Actress
- Spouses: Frithjof Fearnley; Frank Robert
- Relatives: Berit Brænne (sister)

Randi Brænne (26 May 1911 – 1 June 2004) was a Norwegian actress.

== Biography ==
Brænne was born in Kristiania (now Oslo), Norway. She was a daughter of Sigmund Brænne and Bodil Winge and was a sister of actress and writer Berit Brænne (1918–1976). Randi Brænne was married to two acting colleagues; Frithjof Fearnley (1896–1971) and Frank Robert (1918–2007).

She made her stage debut at Det Nye Teater in 1934. She performed at various theatres including Den Nationale Scene, Trøndelag Teater, Centralteatret, Riksteatret and Seniorteatret. From 1971 and until retirement in 1982, she was permanently engaged at the Riksteatret.

She had a number of film roles. Among her best-known film appearances were in Du har lovet mig en kone! (1935), Vi som går kjøkkenveien (1933), and Fantegutten (1932).
