= Berit Brænne =

Norwegian actress, children's writer and songwriter

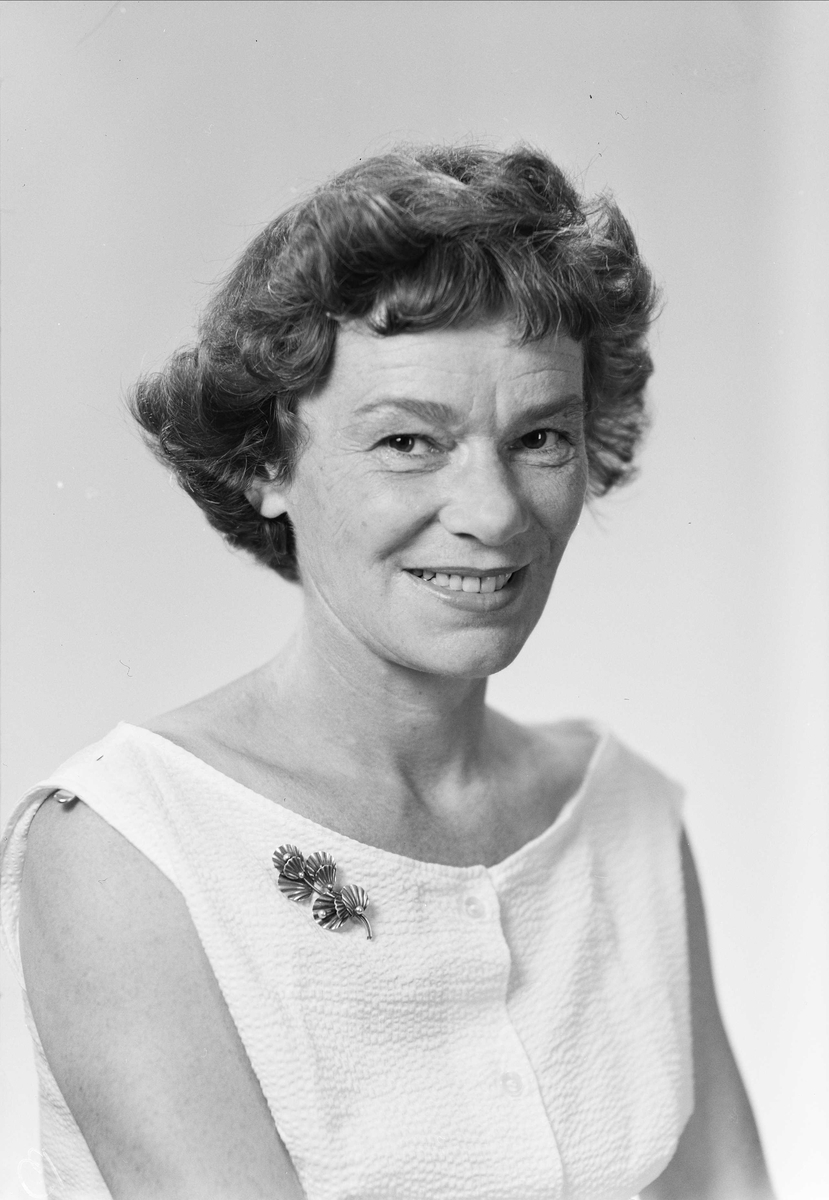
- Berit Brænne in 1959
- Born: 18 September 1918; Aker, Norway
- Died: 6 September 1976 (aged 57)
- Occupation(s): Actress, children's writer and songwriter
- Spouse: Hugo Wathne (m. 1950; div. 1951)
- Relatives: Randi Brænne (sister); Frank Robert (brother-in-law)

Berit Winge Brænne (18 September 1918 – 6 September 1976) was a Norwegian actress, children's writer and songwriter.

== Personal life ==
She was born in Aker, a daughter of architect Sigmund Brænne and Bodil Winge, and sister of actress Randi Brænne. She was married to sculptor Hugo Frank Wathne from 1950 to 1951. She was a sister-in-law of actor Frank Robert.

== Career ==
Brænne made her stage debut at the Oslo theatre Masken in 1938, and worked the next twelve years as actress at various theatres in Oslo, Bergen and Stavanger. From 1946 she contributed with songs and audio plays to the radio show Lørdagsbarnetimen (the Saturday children's hour) for the Norwegian Broadcasting Corporation. From 1954 she contributed to the popular morning show Barnetimen for de minste. Her first story here was Dukkemannen Tulleruskomsnusk; this was later published as a book in 1961.

Her first book, Historien om Tamar og Trine from 1958, is a story about a sailor's family who has adopted children from different parts of the world. The book contained the song "Jorden snurrer rundt og rundt med barn på alle kanter" (English: The world turns round and round with children on all sides), which found its way into songbooks for schoolchildren. The sequels Tai-mi, Tamar og Trines søster and Tom Tangloppe, bror til Tamar, Trine og Ta-mi, were published in 1959 and 1960, respectively. From 1964 she wrote several television shows for children.

Her trilogy Tørris (1967–1969) treats the life in a rural society in the mid 19th century from a child's perspective. The boy "Tørris" grows up with parents, grandparents, siblings and animals around him, in an idyllic narrative. Both the books about "Tamar" and "Trine" and the series about "Tørris" were illustrated by Borghild Rud.

Brænne was awarded Riksmålsforbundet's honorary prize in 1956. She died in Oslo in 1976.
