= Bredo Greve (filmmaker) =

Norwegian anarchist and filmmaker (born 1939)

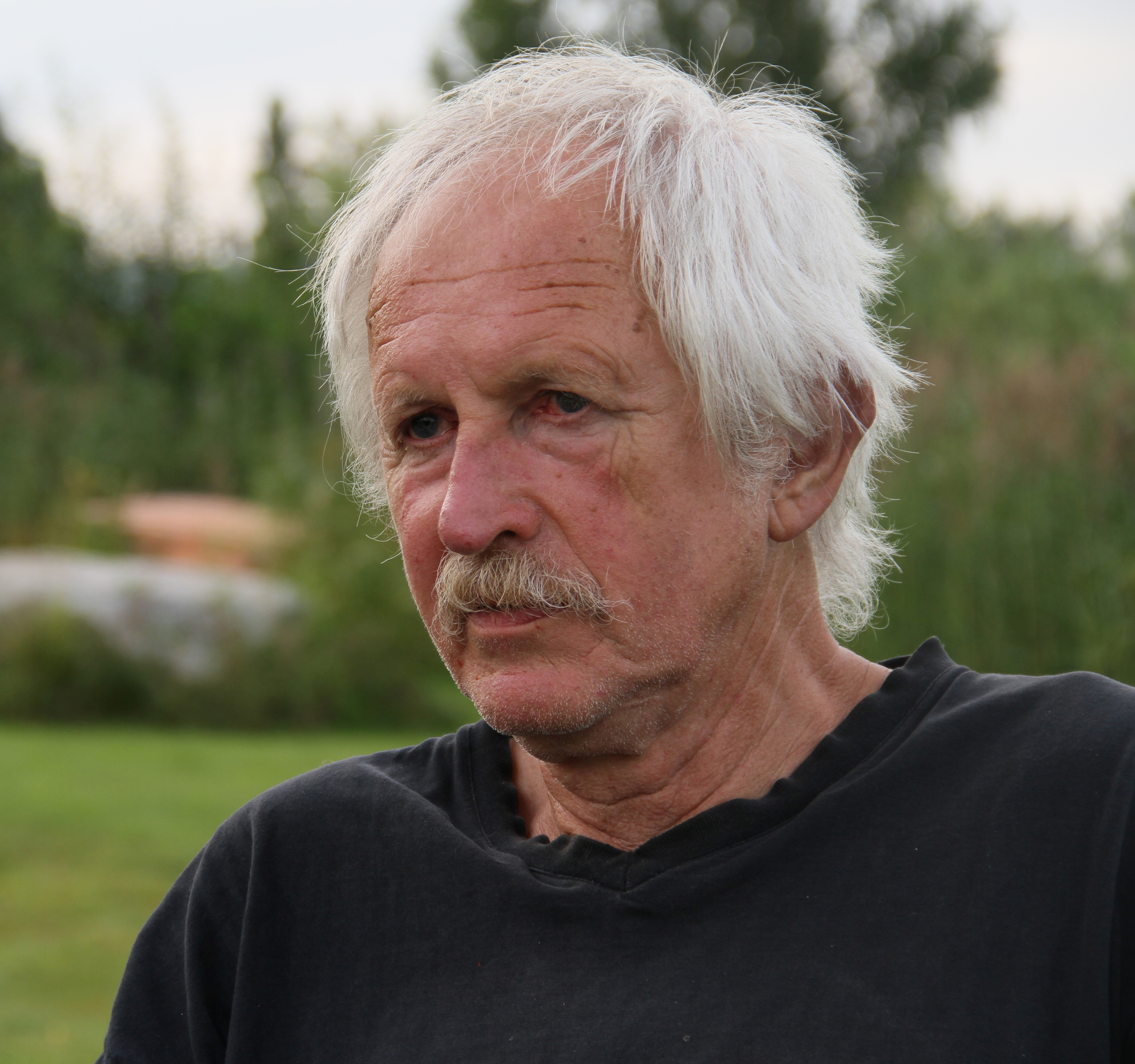
- Bredo Greve, summer of 2011
- Born: Jan Bredo Greve; January 17, 1939 (age 87)
- Occupations: Film director, producer, screenwriter, taxi driver
- Years active: 1966–1986
- Notable work: That Fancy Furcoat of Yours, The Stone Wood Witches, Film a Wonderful World

Bredo Greve is a Norwegian anarchist and filmmaker, who made 3 feature-length films and 12 short films, from 1966 to 1986. His films handle social critical subjects, such as nature conservation, critique of technology and modern society. Most of them share a pessimistic view about the future, but often with a touch of humor. He was also known for making movies on an extreme low budget, usually shooting on 16 mm. Having all his own film equipment, he was very self-reliant, and an independent filmmaker in the true sense of the word.

In 1976 he got a lot of media-attention for his film The Stone Wood Witches. It was an unconventional and controversial film about the teachings of a modern witch, inspired by Carlos Castaneda's books about Don Juan. Many people found it to be “morally degrading and anti-christian”. Among them was the cinema manager in the city of Hønefoss, who denied to screen the movie because of its morals. In protest Bredo screened the movie outside on the wall of the cinema, which led into a lawsuit plus many debates about Norwegian film politics.

Although Bredo Greve was an outspoken and well-known figure in the Norwegian film community in the 1970s, he is less widely known today. His films have not been widely distributed on home video formats such as DVD or VHS. Nevertheless, his work has been noted for its influence on audiences at the time of release.

Among Bredo Greve’s most important works are: That Fancy Furcoat of Yours (1977), The Stone Wood Witches (1976) and Film a Wonderful World (1978).

== Literature ==
- Serigstad, Aleksander U. : På utkanten av norsk film : en studie av Bredo Greves filmer. Lillehammer : Høgskolen i Lillehammer, 2012
- Gulbrandsen, Tom: Filmens vidunderlige verden : en filmteoretisk diskusjon og en narrativ analyse av en norsk spillefilm. Oslo : Universitetet, 2000 (master's thesis)
- Greve, Bredo: I fengsel. Dagbok fra Mashad, Iran. Oslo : Alternativ bokklubb, 1976
