= Jon Heggedal =

Norwegian actor

- Born: December 23, 1935 (age 90); Oslo (now Oslo), Norway
- Occupation: Actor

Jon Heggedal (born December 23, 1935) is a Norwegian stage director and actor.

Heggedal was born in Oslo. He made his stage debut in 1960 as Henrik in Ludvig Holberg's The Political Tinker at the Trøndelag Theater. Heggedal worked as an actor there until 1963, and then he performed at the Oslo new Theater from 1964 to 1966, and for NRK's Television Theater from 1969 to 1975. He started working as a stage director in 1972 and he has been a freelance director since then.

Among other roles, Heggedal played the Dauphin in George Bernard Shaw's Saint Joan, David in Johan Falkberget's Den fjerde nattevakt (arranged for theater by Carl Fredrik Engelstad), and the title role in Friedrich Schiller's Don Carlos. His notable productions include Harold Pinter's The Caretaker, Stewart Parker's Spokesong (Norwegian: På felgen av fryd), both at the Norwegian Theater, and Henrik Ibsen's Peer Gynt at the Sogn og Fjordane Theater.
