= Kjersti Elvik =

Norwegian actress (born 1969)

- Born: 9 March 1969
- Alma mater: Norwegian National Academy of Theatre
- Awards: Amanda Award for Best Actress (Blessed Are Those Who Thirst, 1998); Pernillestatuetten (2019)

Kjersti Elvik (born 9 March 1969) is a Norwegian actress, born in Bergen. She was educated at the Norwegian National Academy of Theatre, and started her career at Trøndelag Teater. Elvik had her breakthrough in the popular Norwegian TV-series "Vestavind", but is probably best known for her role as Hanne Wilhelmsen in the filmatisation of Anne Holt's crime novels Salige er de som tørster and Blind gudinne. She also acted in the television sitcom Seks som Oss on TV2 from 2004 to 2007. In 2009 she starred in Mamma Mia, in the role of Rosy, at Folketeateret in Oslo. She is married and has one child.

== Filmography ==
- Snøfall (2016) TV Series
- Varg Veum – Kvinnen i kjøleskapet (2008)
- Hawaii, Oslo (2004)
- Den som frykter ulven (2004–07)
- Seks som oss (2004) TV Series
- Salige er de som tørster (1997)
- Blind gudinne (1997) (TV)
- Vestavind (1994) (mini) TV Series

== Awards and nominations ==
Year	Organization	Category	Nominee(s)	Result	Ref.
2017	Gullruten	Best Actress, TV Drama	Herself for Snøfall	Nominated	
