= Ragnar Schreiner =

Norwegian actor

Ragnar Schreiner (2 February 1915 – 16 January 1984) was a Norwegian actor.

He was born in Trondheim. He played at the Carl Johan Theater from 1944 and Rogaland Teater from 1947. Notable roles include Higgins in Pygmalion and Gregers Werle in The Wild Duck.
