= Gunnar Haugan =

Norwegian actor (1925–2009)

- Born: August 1, 1925; Trondheim, Norway
- Died: September 29, 2009 (aged 84); Oslo, Norway
- Occupation: Character actor
- Years active: 1960s—1980s

Gunnar Haugan (1 August 1925 – 29 September 2009) was a Norwegian character actor most commonly associated with his appearance on radio and television programs.

== Biography ==
Haugan was born in Trondheim, Norway. He led many programs on Norwegian Broadcasting Corporation (NRK) radio and television. He was perhaps best known for his comedy role in the popular humor and satire radio program Hørerøret which was broadcast by NRK from 1966-1967.

Haugan also appeared on the television comedy series Wesensteen from 1967 until 1970. He later appeared in the television shows Og takk for det (1969), Fleksnes Fataliteter (1972) and Herfra til Haglemoen (1980). In 1972, he worked together with Rolv Wesenlund in the Norwegian satirical comedy film Norske byggeklosser which was directed by Pål Bang-Hansen. Haugan died in 2009 at the age of 84 in Oslo.
