= Sverre Wilberg =

Norwegian actor (1929–1996)

- Born: 24 December 1929
- Died: 19 July 1996 (aged 66)
- Resting place: Vestre gravlund
- Alma mater: Royal Academy of Dramatic Art

Sverre Wilberg (24 December 1929 – 19 July 1996) was a Norwegian actor, perhaps best remembered as the clumsy police superintendent Hermansen, always going after Egon and the rest of Olsenbanden. Sometimes he manages to catch up with them, and sometimes he fails completely, and is often demoted by his superior to parking ticket guard, officer of the riding police, and such.

He died in Oslo in 1996.
