= Sverre Holm =

Norwegian actor (1931–2005)

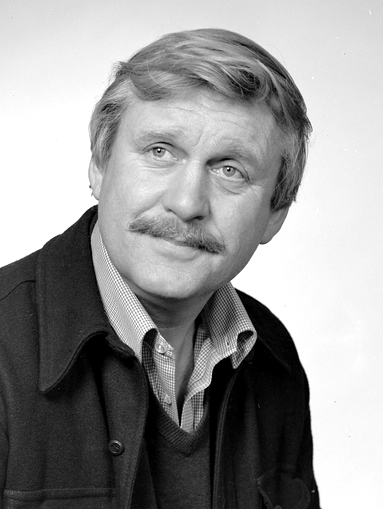
Holm in 1981

Sverre Holm Gundersen (24 July 1931 – 17 March 2005) was a Norwegian stage and film actor. Gundersen was best known for playing Benny in the Olsenbanden-movies (1969–1999), and as station master O. Tidemann in the Norwegian children's program Sesam Stasjon (1990–1998), the Norwegian version of the US program, Sesame Street.

Holm was born in Drammen and was in his youth a relatively good player for a bandy club known as Drafn. He married three times: to Marit Gulbrandsen (later divorced), to the actress Sissel Juul (1939–1987) in 1963, and to the occupational nurse Kari Anne Harnes in 1990. He died in Larvik, Norway, at the age of 73, from cancer.
