= List of Norwegian films of the 1960s =

Films produced in Norway in the 1960s:

== 1960s ==
Title	Director	Cast	Genre	Notes
1960
Aku-Aku	Thor Heyerdahl	Thor Heyerdahl	Documentary	
Omringet	Arne Skouen		Historical, Drama, War film	
Struggle for Eagle Peak	Tancred Ibsen		Drama	Entered into the 10th Berlin International Film Festival
1961
Askeladden og De gode hjelperne	Ivo Caprino		Adventure	
Hans Nielsen Hauge	Kåre Bergstrøm		Biopic, Historical, Drama	
The Passionate Demons	Nils Reinhardt Christensen		Drama	Entered into the 1961 Cannes Film Festival
Det store varpet	Nils R. Müller		Drama	Entered into the 2nd Moscow International Film Festival
1962
Kalde spor	Arne Skouen	Toralv Maurstad	Crime, Drama	Entered into the 3rd Moscow International Film Festival
Tonny	Nils R. Müller		Drama	Entered into the 12th Berlin International Film Festival
1963
Om Tilla	Arne Skouen		Drama	
1964
Alle tiders kupp	Øyvind Vennerød		Crime, Comedy	
Klokker i måneskinn	Kåre Bergstrøm	Rolf Søder, Rønnaug Alten, Turid Balke	Horror, Mystery, Thriller	
1965
1966
Afrikaneren	Barthold Halle		Drama	
Hunger	Henning Carlsen		Drama	Adaptation of Knut Hamsun's novel Hunger.
1967
Himmel og hav! - Stompa til sjøs	Nils-Reinhardt Christensen		Comedy	
Liv	Pål Løkkeberg		Drama	Entered into the 17th Berlin International Film Festival
1968
The Man Who Could Not Laugh	Bo Hermansson	Rolv Wesenlund, Harald Heide-Steen Jr., Wenche Myhre	Comedy	
1969
An-Magritt	Arne Skouen	Liv Ullmann	Drama, Historical	
Scorched Earth	Knut Andersen		Drama, War, Historical	Entered into the 6th Moscow International Film Festival
