= Å æ kjinne ein kar =

Song

"Å æ kjinne ein kar" (lit. "Oh, I Know a Guy") is a song with text by Harald Tusberg and music by Egil Monn-Iversen. It was introduced in the musical Bør Børson Jr. based on Falkberget's story Bør Børson jr., which was staged at Det Norske Teatret in 1972. The song was performed by Britt Langlie, and was one of the most popular songs from the musical. Composer Egil Monn-Iversen was awarded the Spellemannprisen Honorary Award for 1972 for his compositions to the musical. In 1974 the song reached a wider audience through the musical film Bør Børson Jr.
