= Ungen (1974 film) =

- Directed by: Barthold Halle
- Written by: Barthold Halle; Randi Weum; Harald Tusberg; Egil Monn-Iversen; Oskar Braaten
- Based on: Oskar Braaten's play Ungen: folkeliv i fire akter
- Produced by: Lasse Glomm; Egil Monn-Iversen
- Starring: Britt Langlie; Bjørn Skagestad; Kirsti Kolstad; Sølvi Wang
- Cinematography: Sverre Bergli
- Edited by: Randi Weum
- Music by: Egil Monn-Iversen
- Distributed by: Norsk Film A/S
- Release date: December 26, 1974
- Running time: 121 minutes
- Country: Norway
- Language: Norwegian

Ungen (The Child) is a Norwegian film musical and drama film from 1974 directed by Barthold Halle. The main roles are played by Britt Langlie, Bjørn Skagestad, Kirsti Kolstad, and Sølvi Wang. The film is loosely based on Oskar Braaten's play Ungen: folkeliv i fire akter (The Child: Everyday Life in Four Acts) from 1911, which is about the young unmarried and pregnant factory worker Milja. The film can be characterized as a musical drama with certain comedic elements.

== Plot ==
The plot is set in Kristiania at the end of the 19th century. The young factory worker Milja (Britt Langlie) ends up unmarried and pregnant and is abandoned by Julius (Bjørn Skagestad) in favor of the beautiful but unreliable Petrina (Kirsti Kolstad). Julius allows himself to be bewitched by the unreliable girl, who leads him to drink and steal. Milja soon sits alone with her shame and her unplanned child. Desperate, Milja tries to give her child away, so that he will have better conditions than those she herself can manage to give him. But Hønse-Lovisa manages to convince her that material benefits can never outweigh true love and care. Hønse-Lovisa is a woman in the local community that takes care of single mothers, and thus offers shelter and care to factory girls that have gotten "into trouble" so that they can keep their children even if they were born out of wedlock.

== Background and production ==
Braaten's play Ungen was first staged at the National Theater in 1913. In 1938 the first film adaptation was released, and in 1960 a television version of the play was aired.

Braaten was strongly connected with the Norwegian Theater, and the theatrical premiere of the musical took place at the theater in 1973. The film is based on this theater production. The musical has been staged several times on Norwegian stages, including at the Torshov Theater in the fall of 2014, where it received very positive reviews in Aftenposten. The theater musical was written by Harald Tusberg and Egil Monn-Iversen, who had leading roles in Norwegian entertainment. The musical was adapted for film by Barthold Halle and Randi Weum.

Braaten had an intimate knowledge of the environment he described and the innermost thoughts of the factory workers. The main character, Milja, has features of Oskar Braaten's own mother, who moved to Sagene in Oslo and was a housewife from Ullensaker. The bourgeoisie living on the other side of the Aker River are all lumped together; they are characterized through an inherent contempt for the factory girls, who in their eyes were both shameful and licentious creatures. This was a time when poor single mothers were called frivolous and exposed to society's moral condemnation.

Egil Monn-Iversen integrated the music into the story itself, although Braaten's story is unchanged. Monn-Iversen drew on the broadside ballad tradition for inspiration for the music.

Harald Heide Steen appeared in both the original film and the musical. He played Julius in the 1938 film, and he played the defense lawyer Engebret in the 1974 film.

== Reception ==
Aftenposten's reviewer praised the film and wrote, among other things, "It really has succeeded in realistically portraying the working environment from Braaten's book against a musical background, and credit for this must go to the director and the main actors." The reviewer concludes with: "the music has become an integral and necessary part of a film that bodes well for similar attempts in the future." Arbeiderbladet's Bjørn Granum was more divided in his analysis, and wrote positively that "we are dealing with a proper entertainment film." However, he also suggested that the depictions of the environment in the film are more rosy than Braaten's. He also pointed out that Rolv Wesenlund's character as a sleazy preacher was taken from another of Oskar Braaten's stories (Den store barnedåpen) and did not fit into the film; Granum wrote in that regard that "the previously rather flimsy realistic framework in the film is completely broken."

== Cast ==
- Espen Sandvik as the child
- Nicolai Ryen Christiansen as the child
- Britt Langlie as Milja
- Bjørn Skagestad as Julius
- Kirsti Kolstad as Petrina
- Sølvi Wang as Hønse-Lovisa
- Ragnhild Nygaard as Krestna
- Carsten Byhring as Krestoffer
- Harald Heide Steen as the defense lawyer
- Rolv Wesenlund as the revival preacher
- Frimann Falck Clausen as the doctor
- Anita Rummelhoff as Gurina
- Aasta Voss as Lagreta, Julius's mother
- Dag Sandvik as Olaves
- Karin Helene Haugen as Olina
- Sidsel Ryen as Sergeant Petra
- Inger Lise Rypdal as Alvilde
- Marit Kolbræk as Georgine
- Synnøve Abrahamsen as a working woman
- Kjersti Alveberg as a working woman
- Wenche Lund as a working woman
- Maria Monsen as a working woman
- Tove Edwards as a working woman
- Main Kristoffersen as a working woman
- Birgitta Revold as a working woman
- Kari-Laila Thorsen as a working woman
- Leif Bjørnseth as a worker
- Jon Berle as a worker
- Runar Borge as a worker
- Magne Lindholm as a worker
- Roy Lindquist as a worker
- Svenn Berglund as a worker
