= Bør Børson Jr. =

Bør Børson Jr. could refer to:

- Bør Børson jr. (novel), 1920 novel written by Norwegian writer Johan Falkberget
- Bør Børson Jr. (musical), 1972 Norwegian musical production
- Bør Børson Jr. (1938 film), 1938 Norwegian comedy film
- Bør Børson Jr. (1974 film), 1974 Norwegian musical film
- Bør Børson II, 1976 Norwegian musical film, sequel to Bør Børson Jr.
