= Alf Malland =

Norwegian actor (1917–1997)

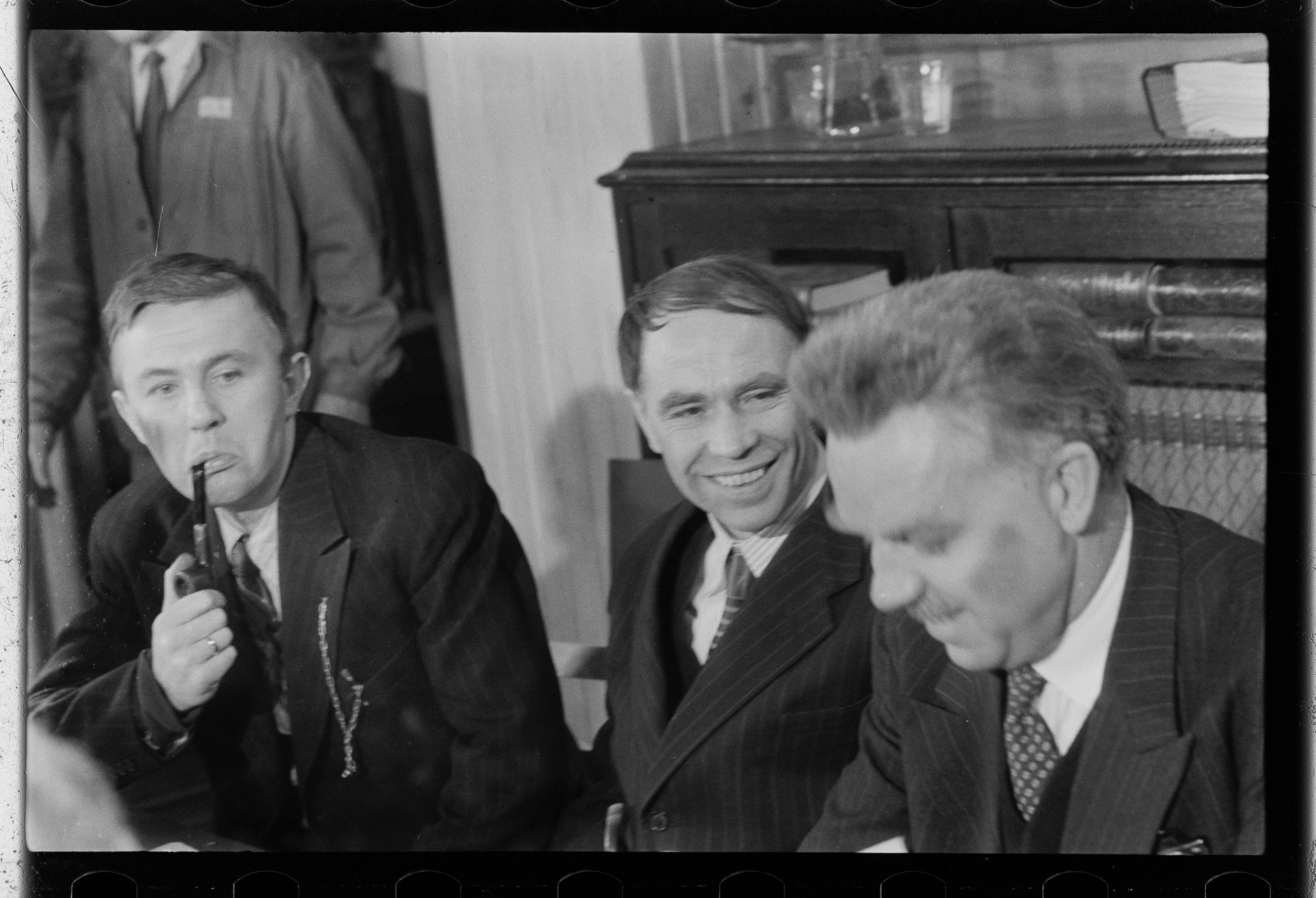
- Alf Malland (middle) during the production of Freske fraspark (1963)
- Born: 24 January 1917; Bergen, Norway
- Died: 16 August 1997 (aged 80); Bærum, Norway
- Other name: Mjølner Hansen
- Occupation: Actor
- Years active: 1957–1981

Alf Malland (24 January 1917 – 16 August 1997) was a Norwegian actor.

== Biography ==
He was born in Bergen, Norway. He began his acting career as a student at the Det Norske Teatret in Oslo. Following the German occupation of Norway during World War II, he quit as a theater student and participated in the resistance. Malland first went to Sweden and in 1942 he left for Great Britain where he trained as a paratrooper. He arrived at Finnmark in November 1944 as company commander with the Norwegian forces.

In 1946, he was again at Det Norske Teatret and took up his theater studies. He was first employed there then freelanced. He appeared in 42 films and television shows between 1949 and 1987. He starred in the academy award nominated 1957 film Nine Lives, and in Struggle for Eagle Peak, which was entered into the 10th Berlin International Film Festival.

== Partial filmography ==
- Death Is a Caress (1949) - En konstabel (uncredited)
- Trine! (1952) - En politimann
- Ung frue forsvunnet (1953) - Vaktmannen (uncredited)
- Skøytekongen (1953)
- Trost i taklampa (1955)
- Hjem går vi ikke (1955)
- Nine Lives (1957) - Martin
- Pastor Jarman kommer hjem (1958) - Tor
- Struggle for Eagle Peak (1960) - Tomas Gran
- Omringet (1960) - Frimann
- Et øye på hver finger (1961) - Mørk herre i svart bil
- Cold Tracks (1962) - Tormod
- Freske fraspark (1963) - Ollvar
- Marenco (1964) - Chowski
- Klokker i måneskinn (1964) - Styrmannen, 'Journalistens foretelling'
- To på topp (1965) - Pengeinnkreveren
- Vaktpostene (1965) - Kapteinen
- Broder Gabrielsen (1966) - Broder Gabrielsen
- Smuglere (1968)
- An-Magritt (1969) - Merra-Per
- One Day in the Life of Ivan Denisovich (1970) - Fetiukov
- Love Is War (1971) - Doctor
- The Call of the Wild (1972) - Constantine
- Bør Børson Jr. (1974) - Ole Elveplassen
- Ransom (1974) - Police Inspector
- Kjære Maren (1976) - Mann
- Bør Børson II (1976) - Ole Elveplassen
- Olsenbanden for full musikk (1976) - Fritz, altmuligmann
- Karjolsteinen (1977) - Politibetj.
- Olsenbanden og Data-Harry sprenger verdensbanken (1978) - Hallandsen, kjeltring
- Blood of the Railroad Workers (1979) - Per flink
- Olsenbanden gir seg aldri! (1981) - Aksjonsleder i politiet
- Olsenbandens aller siste kupp (1982) - Personalvakt med overvåkning
- Men Olsenbanden var ikke død! (1984) - Guide på Munchmuseet
- Etter Rubicon (1987) - Arne Michelsen
