= Falkberget =

Falkberget is a Norwegian surname. Notable people with the surname include:

- Aasta Falkberget (1905–1983), Norwegian writer and painter
- Johan Falkberget (1879–1967), Norwegian author
- Magnus Falkberget (1900–1957), Norwegian actor, son of Johan
