= Sølvi Wang =

Norwegian singer, actress and comedian

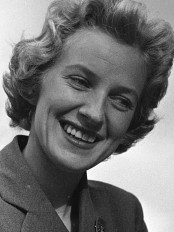
- Sølvi Wang in 1957
- Born: Sølvi Valborg Wang; 28 August 1929; Bærum, Norway
- Died: 31 May 2011 (aged 81); Oslo, Norway
- Occupations: Actress, singer, comedian
- Years active: 1937 – 1987
- Spouse: Egil Monn-Iversen (m. 1951 – 2011, her death)

Sølvi Valborg Wang (28 August 1929 – 31 May 2011) was a Norwegian singer, actress and comedian.

Wang was born in Bærum, Akershus, to the jazz musician Yngvar Wang and the singer Marie Gulbrandsen. Already at an early age, she sang with her father's orchestra on the radio and in concert. Wang met Egil Monn-Iversen while in school, and in 1948 she founded the music group The Monn Keys together with him. Wang debuted as a recording artist in 1950, in a duet with Arve Opsahl. Later she recorded solo albums, and was responsible for 18 releases in the years up until 1955. Wang combined her solo career with performances with The Monn Keys, which now also included the singers Nora Brockstedt and Per Asplin. In 1954, the group performed their first variety show, Over alle grenser, at Chat Noir in Oslo. She worked at Chat Noir in the years 1952 to 1963, then at Edderkoppen from 1963 to 1964, before moving to Det Norske Teatret. Though she continued to regularly appear in comedy shows at Chat Noir until the mid-1980s.

In addition to making recordings and performing in variety shows, Wang also performed in musicals, on television and in movies. For 25 years she was the leading lady of Det Norske Teatret, where she played the lead roles in such musicals as West Side Story, Fiddler on the Roof, Annie Get Your Gun and The King and I. She also acted in musicals composed by her husband Monn-Iversen, most prominently among these Bør Børson Jr., based on a novel by Johan Falkberget.

Among Wang's many television shows, That's Entertainment from 1966 gained her international attention when it won the award for best comedy show at the Montreux Comedy Festival. The award led to performances at The Ed Sullivan Show, and with Jack Parnell's orchestra at the London Palladium. She was even offered her own sitcom at BBC, but had to decline due to her family. Wang had the lead role in movies such as the 1964 comedy Pappa tar gull and the 1978 drama Hvem har bestemt?.

Sølvi Wang acted in a production of the musical Fiddler on the Roof in 1987. This performance marked her retirement from the public stage; thereafter, she did not made any public performances. As a singer, even though she mastered the soft, subdued style of ballads in recordings, Wang's vocal style has been described primarily as belting. This powerful, often sharp way of singing was a necessity in the world of live musical performance prior to the introduction of miniature microphones. Wang has been called the only master of the style in Norwegian theatre history.

== Select filmography ==
Year	Title	Role
1953	Brudebuketten	Singer
1954	Troll i ord	Singer
1962	Operasjon Løvsprett	Head nurse Florence
1964	Operasjon Sjøsprøyt	Eli Sæter, assistant doctor
1970	Balladen om mestertyven Ole Høiland	Hilda Hauge
1972	Norske byggeklosser	Mrs Valle
1974	Bør Børson Jr.	Laura Isaksen
1974	Ungen	Hønse-Lovisa
1978	Hvem har bestemt?	Mrs Nelson

== Selected stage performances ==
Year	Title	Genre	Theatre / venue	Role
1952	Over alle grenser	Revue	Chat Noir	Various roles
1953	Være, eller ikke være	Revue	Chat Noir	Various roles
1954	Revy-katta får liv igjen	Revue	Chat Noir	Various roles
1955	Kjør Storgata	Revue	Chat Noir	Various roles
1957	Fifty-fifty	Musical	Centralteatret	
1959	Det går på by'n	Revue	Chat Noir	Various roles
	Apekattene	Revue	Chat Noir	Various roles
1960	Folk skal trives	Revue	Chat Noir	Various roles
	Vi gratulerer – Norsk Dusteforbunds jubileumsrevy	Revue	Chat Noir	Various roles
1961	Vi jubler – Chat Noir 50th anniversary	Revue	Chat Noir	Various roles
	Vi skal trivas	Revue	Kabarethallen, Liseberg, Göteborg	Various roles
1962	Vår i byen	Revue	Chat Noir	Various roles
	Vi skal trivas	Revue	Chinatheatern, Stockholm	Various roles
1963	Trost i taklampa	Musical	Det Norske Teatret	Gunvor Smikkstugun
	Under samme hatt	Revue	Edderkoppen teater	Various roles
1964	Oh, What a Lovely War!	Musical	Det Norske Teatret	
	Den svarte katta	Revue	Chat Noir	Various roles
	Annie Get Your Gun	Musical	Det Norske Teatret	Annie Oakley
	Det er jo så deilig...	Revue	Chat Noir	Various roles
1965	West Side Story	Musical	Det Norske Teatret	Anita
	Pygmalion	Theatre	Det Norske Teatret	Eliza Doolittle
1966	Lyse øyeblikk	Revue	Chat Noir	Various roles
	Ja, lystelig det er i nord	Revue	Kabarethallen, Liseberg, Göteborg	Various roles
	The King and I	Musical	Det Norske Teatret	Anna
1967	Apropo det, ja (with Leif Juster and Sølvi Wang)	Revue	Norway tour and Det Norske Teatret	Various roles
	Sus i sassafrasen	Theatre	Det Norske Teatret	Caroline
1968	Fiddler on the Roof	Musical	Det Norske Teatret	Golde
1969	I Do! I Do!	Musical	Norway tour and Det norske teatret	
	Den skal tidlig krøkes	Revue	Chat Noir	Various roles
1970	Operette	Musical	Det Norske Teatret	The Princess
	Sølvi Solo also called Sølvi!	Revue	Det Norske Teatret	All roles
1971	Song of Sølvi	Revue	Det Norske Teatret	All roles
	Flyktning 71	Charity gala	Kungliga teatern, Stockholm	
1972	Bør Børson jr.	Musical	Det Norske Teatret	Miss Laura, Baroness von Rosenhal, et al.
	Kjøre kolleger	Revue	Riksteatret	Various roles, two-person revue with Rolv Wesenlund
	The Threepenny Opera	Operetta	NRK Radioteatret	Polly Peachum, the daughter of Peachum
1973	Ungen	Musical	Det Norske Teatret	Hønse-Lovisa
	Bør Børson jr.	Musical	Det Norske Teatret	Miss Laura, Baroness von Rosenhal, et al.
1974	Kjem du i kveld		Det Norske Teatret	
1975	The Good Person of Szechwan	Theatre	Det Norske Teatret	Mrs. Shin
	Jacques Brel is Alive and Well and Living in Paris	Musical revue	Det Norske Teatret	
1976	Jeppe på Bjerget	Musical	Det Norske Teatret	Nille
1978	Så lenge skuta kan gå	Cabaret	Det Norske Teatret	
	Solstreif	Revue	ABC-teatret	Various roles
1979	L/L Wang og Nilsen	Revue	Det Norske Teatret	Various roles
1980	Jubileumsfest for Juster – 70 years	Revue	Chat Noir	Various roles
1981	L/L Wang og Nilsen	Revue	Riksteatret (Norway tour)	Various roles
1982	Kvitt ekteskap	Comedy	Det Norske Teatret	The Aunt
	Dampen	Comedy	Oslo Nye Teater	
	Dyrene i Hakkebakkeskogen	Children's theatre	Oslo Nye Teater	Grandma Forest Mouse
1983	Syvende himmel	Revue	Chat Noir	Various roles
1984	Send inn ein klovn!	Cabaret	Det Norske Teatret	
	Trost i taklampa	Musical	Det Norske Teatret	Tonetta
1986	My Fair Lady	Musical	Chateau Neuf	Mrs. Higgins
1987	Fiddler on the Roof	Musical	Det Norske Teatret	Golde
