= Bør Børson jr. (novel) =

1917 novel by Johan Falkberget

- First book edition cover
- Author: Johan Falkberget
- Language: Norwegian
- Genre: satirical novel
- Set in: World War I era Norway
- Published: 1917 (feuilleton); 1920 (book)
- Publisher: H. Aschehoug & Co.
- Publication place: Norway

Bør Børson jr. is a satirical novel from the boom period during World War I, written by Norwegian writer Johan Falkberget. It was first published as a feuilleton in the satirical magazine Hvepsen in 1917, then again printed as a feuilleton in the newspaper Nidaros, and issued as a book in 1920. The story was a great success, and has later been adapted into two films (one in 1938 and one in 1974), a comedy, a musical, and a comic series.

== Plot ==
"Bør Børson Olderstad" is a farmer's son from the fictional valley of Olderdalen, located in Sør-Trøndelag. Dreaming about money, wealth and a position at the board of the local savings bank, he has changed his last name to Børson, and started a local grocery store. The name Børson is a paraphrase of the Norwegian word børs, from the French: bourse, in English: stock market. Via various burlesque episodes, he eventually ends up as a millionaire. The story ends with a wedding between Bør and Josefine Torsøien, a girl from a nearby farm.

The novel is set in the Norwegian boom period during World War I. Norway did not participate in the war, but the country's merchant fleet carried goods at increasing freight rates. Sea transport was a risky business that cost the lives of 2,000 Norwegian seamen, but a volatile stock market could multiply investments over short periods of time.

== Reception ==
Literary critics barely mentioned the book, but the satire was met with great popularity among readers.

When Falkberget wrote a sequel called Den nye Bør Børson jr. for the magazine Arbeidermagasinet in 1927, he set the condition that the story should not be issued in book form.

== Derivative works ==
The story was adapted for theatre by Toralf Sandø, who also played the title character with the touring ensemble Falkbergets Teater from 1929. Their performances in Trondheim in February 1929 were met with full houses and an enthusiastic public response. The story was basis for a 1938 film, where the title role was played by Sandø. The theatre version was again staged at Det Norske Teatret in 1958. A musical by Harald Tusberg and Egil Monn-Iversen was staged at Det Norske Teatret in 1972, with Rolv Wesenlund as Bør and Britt Langlie as Josefine. The musical introduced popular songs such as "Å æ kjinne ein kar", "Børs Song" and "Wienerbrød-tango", and was awarded the Spellemannprisen Honorary Award for 1972. A film based on Tusberg and Monn-Iversen's musical was released in 1974. A comic series in the magazine Nynorsk Vekeblad was drawn by Arne Wold.
