= Bør Børson II =

- Directed by: Stein-Roger Bull
- Written by: Harald Tusberg
- Starring: Rolv Wesenlund; Britt Langlie
- Music by: Egil Monn-Iversen
- Release date: 8 November 1976
- Running time: 101 minutes
- Country: Norway
- Language: Norwegian

Bør Børson II is a 1976 Norwegian musical film directed by Stein-Roger Bull and starring Rolv Wesenlund and Britt Langlie. The film is a sequel to the 1974 film Bør Børson Jr.
