= Freske fraspark =

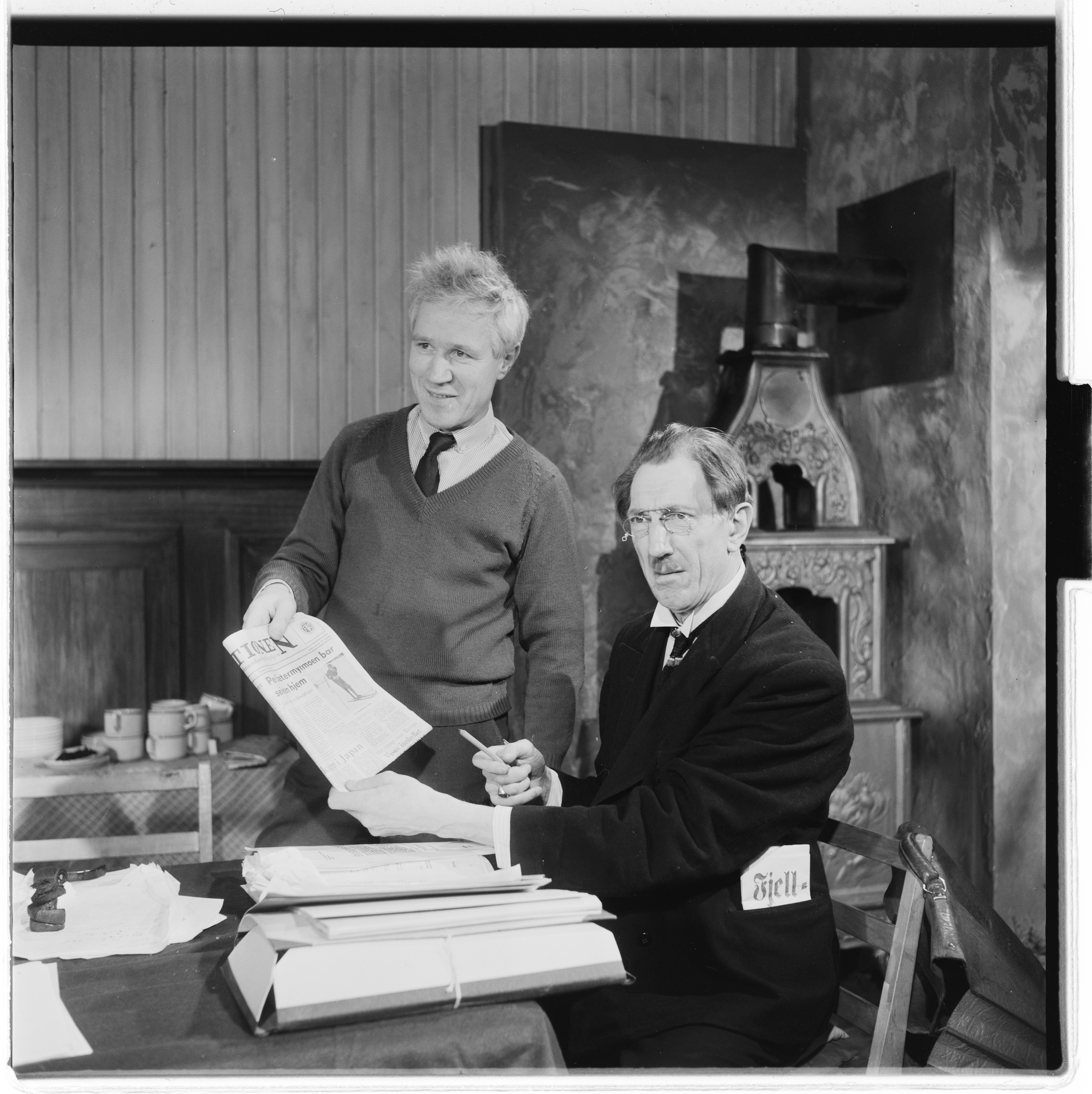
- Scriptwriter Kjell Aukrust and actor Leif Juster during the filming of Freske fraspark, a film adaptation of Aukrust's play Dobbeltsats og freske fraspark
- Directed by: Bjørn Breigutu
- Written by: Kjell Aukrust; Bjørn Breigutu
- Based on: Kjell Aukrust's play Dobbeltsats og freske fraspark
- Produced by: Per W. Bistrup; Jan Erik Düring
- Starring: Henki Kolstad; Einar Vaage; Birger Løvaas; Alf Malland
- Cinematography: Sverre Bergli
- Edited by: Bjørn Breigutu; Jan Erik Düring
- Music by: Kjell Karlsen; Egil Storbekken
- Distributed by: Syncron-film A/S
- Release date: August 19, 1963
- Running time: 90 minutes
- Country: Norway
- Language: Norwegian

Freske fraspark (Fresh Push-Offs) is a Norwegian comedy film from 1963 directed by Bjørn Breigutu. The script was written by Kjell Aukrust and Breigutu. The story was previously arranged for stage for the Norwegian Theater in Oslo as the play Dobbeltsats og freske fraspark (Double Takeoff and Fresh Push-Offs), which was based on scenes from Aukrust's books Simen and Bror min, published in 1958 and 1960.

Filming of Freske fraspark took place in Alvdal, Tolga, and Vingelen. The film was very poorly received by the reviewer at Verdens Gang, who gave it one star out of six.

== Plot ==
An old village dispute between Alvdal and Tynset has flared up again in the winter of 1936. The reason is that Per Sætermyrmoen has won the Holmenkollen 50 km cross-country ski race, and both villages would like to claim him as one of their own and celebrate the skier upon his return home.

== Cast ==
- Henki Kolstad as Embret Trondsbakken
- Einar Vaage as the father-in-law
- Birger Løvaas as Martin
- Alf Malland as Ollvar
- Frank Robert as Jostein
- Ragnhild Michelsen as Oline, Embret's wife
- Turid Balke as Martin's wife
- Elsa Lystad as Ollvar's wife
- Kari Diesen as Jostein's wife
- Carsten Byhring as the editor
- Leif Juster as Torgrim Skarpjordet
- Svein Byhring one of the Alvdal residents
