= Bør Børson Jr. (musical) =

Norwegian musical

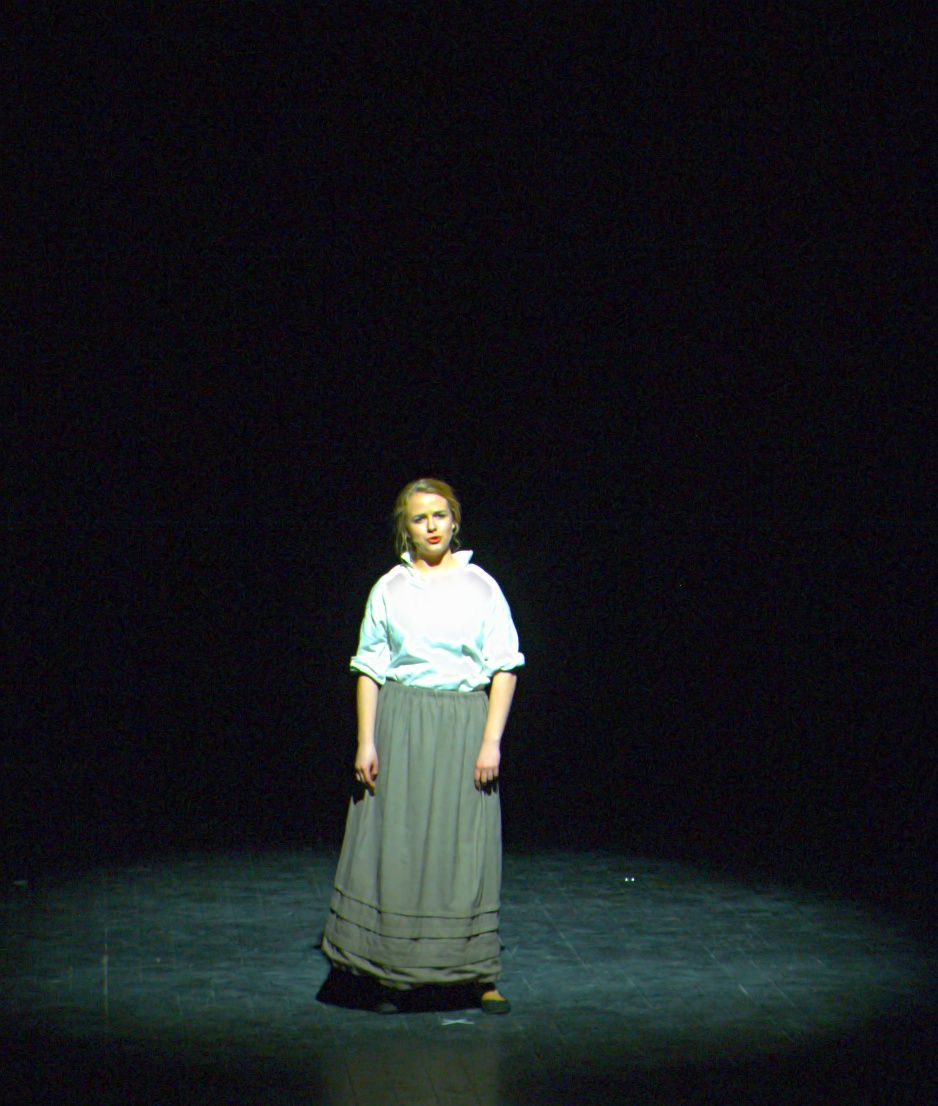
- Music: Egil Monn-Iversen
- Lyrics: Harald Tusberg
- Book: Harald Tusberg
- Basis: Johan Falkbergets novel Bør Børson Jr.
- Productions: 1972 Oslo, Norway 1973 Trondheim, Norway; 1973 National tour, Norway; 1974 Norwegian movie 1975 Aalborg, Denmark; 1998 Trondheim, Norway; 2001 Oslo, Norway; 2009 Tromsø, Norway; 2013 Trondheim, Norway; 2018 Innlandet, Norway 2022 Regional Tour, Norway

Bør Børson Jr. is a Norwegian musical based on the novel Bør Børson Jr. written by Johan Falkberget in 1920. The musical was written by Egil Monn-Iversen (music) and Harald Tusberg (book/lyrics). The performance is considered the first Norwegian musical, and has since its premiere in 1972 achieved great popularity. It is still being performed in theaters across Norway.

The plot follows Bør, a young businessman from the countryside, with big ambitions and great naivety. He runs the village's general store and often travels on business trips to Trondheim. Before he achieves his fame and wealth, he must fight against seductive maidens, «village beasts», and stock speculators. The action is set in the fictional village of Olderdalen in Sør-Trøndelag.

Bør Børson Jr. confirmed that not only Broadway and West End could be suppliers of premises for musicals, but that stories from Norway were also suitable for musical theater. The performance was even at one point considered to be produced for performance on Broadway.

The music reflected Norwegian folk tradition, and Monn-Iversen used gammaldans as a consistent musical approach. The musical and Egil Monn-Iversen were awarded the jury's honorary prize during Spellemannprisen the same year as the premiere of the musical.

Songs from the musical, such as «Wienerbrød-tango», «Æ kjinne ein kar», «Omforlatels O. C. Bentzen» and «Børs song», have become classics in Norwegian popular music.

== Original cast ==
Character	Name
Bør Børson Jr.	Rolv Wesenlund
Josefine Torsøien	Britt Langlie
Laura Isaksen / Baroness von Rossenhald / Miss Finckel	Sølvi Wang
Nils Tollvold jr / Olsen, attorney and museum director	Dag Sandvik
Old Bør, father to Bør / Elias Månen, stockbroker	Rolf Sand
Ole Elveplassen	Wilfred Breistrand
O.G. Hansen, sheriff / Ivar Zoler, stockbroker	Sverre Wilberg
Torsøien / The host at Hotel Nordpol	Frimann Falck Clausen
Torsøia	Main Kristoffersen
Ida Olsen	Berit Kullander
Dancers	Kjersti Alveberg Svenn Berglund Jon Berle Leif Bjørneseth Runar Borge Tove Edwards Main Kristoffersen Berit Kullander Wenche Lund
