= Jon Berle =

Norwegian actor, dancer, and choreographer

- Born: July 12, 1932; Buenos Aires, Argentina
- Died: November 30, 2010 (aged 78); Oslo, Norway
- Occupation(s): Actor, dancer, choreographer

Jon Leif Berle (July 12, 1932 – November 30, 2010) was a Norwegian actor, dancer, and choreographer. He performed in productions at the Norwegian Theater and the Norwegian Opera. He also choreographed My Fair Lady for Opera Week in Kristiansund, and he arranged and translated Carmen for the Vestfold Symphony Orchestra in 1981. In 1990, he was the director of the russ revue Røde rytmer at the Hjertnes Civic and Theater Center in Sandefjord, and he was awarded the title "honorary russ" the same year.

== Filmography ==
- 1960: Millionær for en aften as a dancer
- 1960: Omringet
- 1961: Oss atomforskere i mellom
- 1962: Operasjon Løvsprett as a soldier
- 1970: Olsenbanden og Dynamitt-Harry as the gangster in shirt sleeves
- 1972: Olsenbanden tar gull as the driver
- 1974: Ungen as a worker
- 1974: Bør Børson Jr. as a ballet dancer
- 1975: Olsenbandens siste bedrifter as the bus driver
- 1977: Olsenbanden og Dynamitt-Harry på sporet as Mario, a punk
- 1982: Carl Gustav, gjengen og parkeringsbandittene as Farris
- 1989: Viva Villaveien!
