= Anita Rummelhoff =

Norwegian actress (1935–1997)

- Born: Sigrid Anita Rummelhoff; April 8, 1935; Oslo, Norway
- Died: June 28, 1997 (aged 62)
- Occupation: Actress

Anita Rummelhoff (April 8, 1935 – June 28, 1997) was a Norwegian actress.

Rummelhoff was born in Oslo. She made her debut in 1956 at the Norwegian Theater and was then engaged with the National Theatre in Oslo, National Traveling Theater, and Rogaland Theater, and then from 1965 onward once more with the Norwegian Theater. Among the theater roles that Rummelhoff played are Hilde in Ibsen's The Master Builder, Kristina in Strindberg's Easter, and Polly in Bertolt Brecht's The Threepenny Opera. She also appeared in eleven films and television productions from 1955 to 1992, with her film debut in Arne Skouen's Barn av solen.

== Filmography ==
- 1955: Barn av solen as Lise
- 1958: Ut av mørket
- 1959: Hete septemberdager as Susann
- 1974: Ungen as Gurina
- 1977: Åpenbaringen as Esther
- 1979: Rallarblod as Rosa
- 1992: Det perfekte mord

== NRK Television Theater ==
- 1967: The Imaginary Invalid (Norwegian title: Den innbilt syke) by Molière as Toinette
- 1973: Barselstuen by Ludvig Holberg as Dorthe Knapmagers
- 1984: The Good Person of Szechwan (Norwegian title: Det gode mennesket i Sezuan) by Bertolt Brecht as Mrs. Shin

== Television series ==
- 1981: Pelle Parafins Bøljeband og automatspøkelsene as the town witch
