= Hvepsen =

Norwegian satirical magazine (1905–1926)

- Categories: Satirical magazine
- Founded: 1905
- Final issue: 1926
- Country: Norway
- Based in: Kristiania
- Language: Norwegian

Hvepsen (Norwegian: "The Wasp") was a Norwegian humorous and satirical magazine which was in circulation between 1905 and 1926.

== History and profile ==
Hvepsen was founded in 1905 by people involved in the labour movement in Kristiania, including John Johansen, Ole O. Lian, Marius Ormestad, Lyder Strøm and Hans Østerholt. Østerholt was the editor-in-chief from 1905 to 1925.

The frequency of the magazine changed three times. It was published monthly from its inception to 1908. Next it was published bimonthly from 1909 to 1912. Then it was a weekly until its disestablishment in 1926.

Illustrators for Hvepsen included Jens R. Nilssen and text contributors included Johan Falkberget. Falkberget's Bør Børson was first published as a feuilleton in Hvepsen.

The 1920 were tumultuous times. The Norwegian Labour Party saw two parties split away, and Hvepsen supported the new Social Democratic Labour Party of Norway. For this reason the magazine was evicted from Folkets Hus in 1922. It went defunct in 1926, and the publishing rights were held by Arbeidermagasinet until 1932.
