= The Monn Keys =

Norwegian musical show group

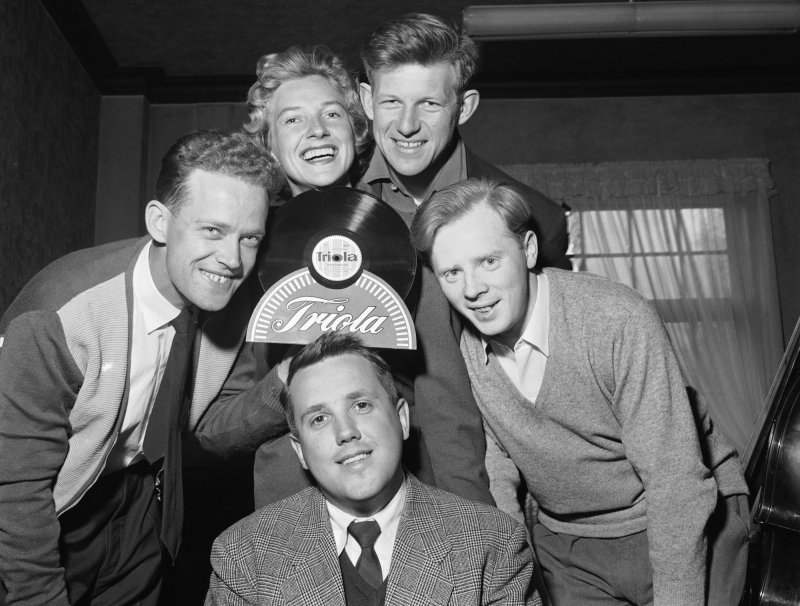

Background information
- Origin: Oslo, Norway
- Genres: Jazz; Pop music Schlager
- Years active: 1948–1964
- Labels: Egil Monn-Iversen A/S; RCA Records; Nera; Warner Bros. Omega Records
- Members: Sølvi Wang; Arne Bendiksen; Per Asplin; Oddvar Sanne
- Past members: Nora Brockstedt; Fredrik Conradi; Johnny Brudvik

The Monn Keys were a Norwegian musical show group that was active from 1948 until 1964. Founded by Sølvi Wang and Egil Monn-Iversen, the group became well-known in Norway for their jazz and pop music performances. The Monn Keys was one of the most successful in Norwegian show business, and became the first musical pop export.

Sølvi Wang, Fredrik Conradi, Arne Bendiksen, Per Asplin, Oddvar Sanne, and Nora Brockstedt were members of the group for shorter or longer periods while it existed. When Per Asplin sustained a neck injury, Johnny Brudvik was his reserve. Erik Diesen became the group's regular lyricist early on and came up with the name for the quintet together with Wang and Monn-Iversen. In total the group released more than 72 records.

The group became very popular in Norway, Sweden, and Denmark, and also performed in Britain, Netherlands, Belgium, US, Germany, Iceland, and for UN forces in Gaza and Egypt. When NRK's TV broadcasts started in the early 1960s, The Monn Keys were a central part of the entertainment. The group was also active on the movie screen, and the group's members had roles in films such as Operasjon Løvsprett, Operasjon Sjøsprøyt, and Brudebuketten.

== History ==
The foundation for The Monn Keys was laid at Hegdehaugen school in Oslo. Egil Monn-Iversen and Sølvi Wang both attended the school and had extensive musical experience despite their young age. The starting point for The Monn Keys was an already existing amateur quintet named De fem sure, founded by Sølvi Wang. Monn-Iversen joined the group, and became Wang's boyfriend and musical partner. They took the ambitions of the group further, as Monn-Iversen had long wanted to establish a Norwegian vocal group following the American model. The group sang in school revues, and quickly developed further, eventually changing their name to The Monn Keys.

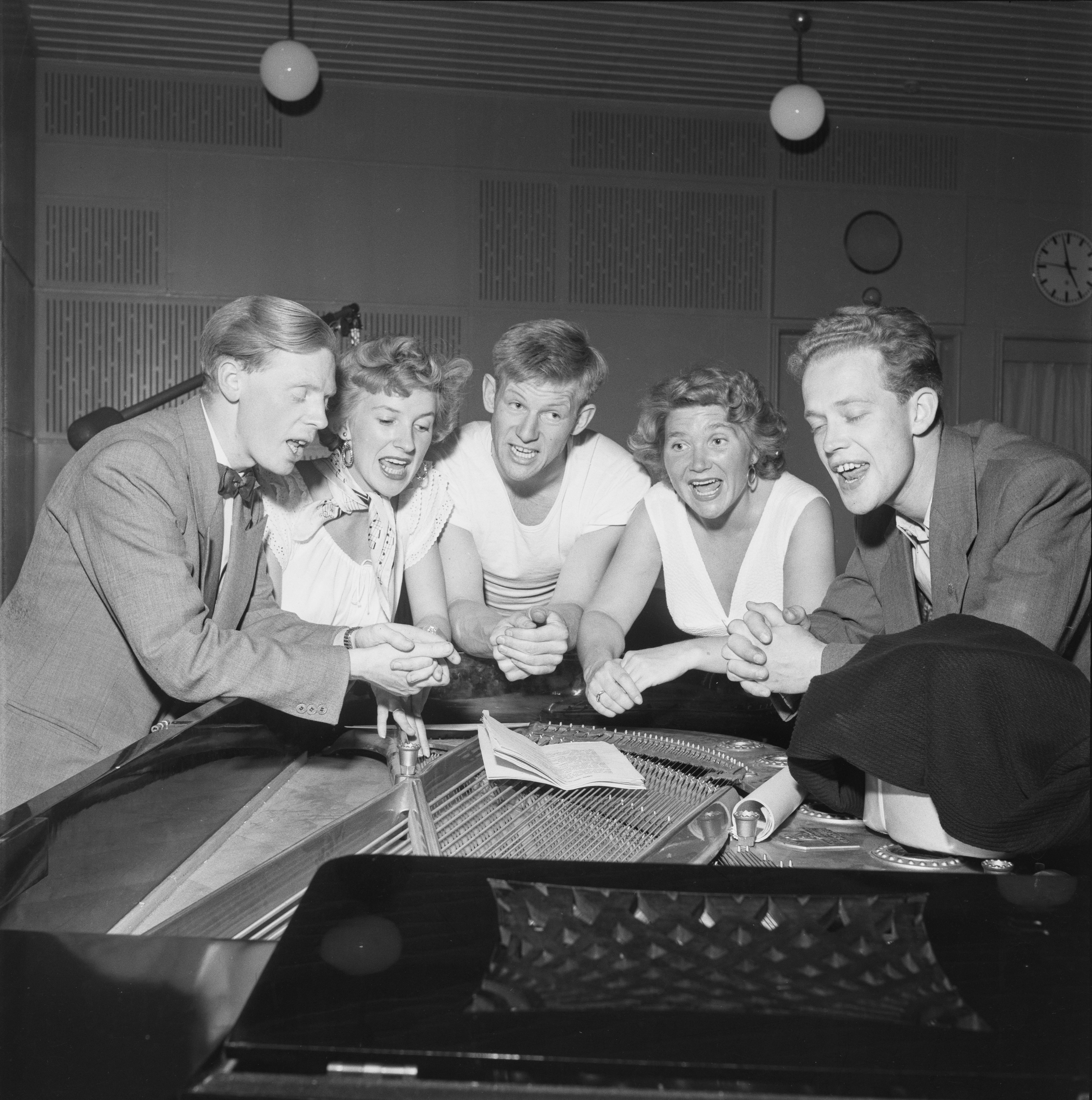
Arne Bendiksen, Sølvi Wang, Per Asplin, Nora Brockstedt, and Oddvar Sanne in The Monn Keys in 1954.

The group debuted as recording artists with Musica in 1951, featuring Sølvi Wang, Per Asplin, Fredrik Conradi, Nora Brockstedt, and Oddvar Sanne. Erik Diesen was involved as a lyricist. The debut record was called Vel møtt igjen and contained a Norwegian version of Auf Wiedersehen, auf wiedersehen (along with singer Jens Chr. Mathisen) and their original En krone pr. kyss. One of the most famous records the group recorded is Hei hå nå er det jul igjen from 1954 written by Per Asplin. This song was also recorded by Per Asplin in a new version on the album Putti Plutti Pott in 1969.

The group quickly became known through record releases, radio, and film – and in 1954 they were offered a permanent engagement at the theater Chat Noir in Oslo. Fredrik Conradi left the group for a job as advertising manager at Esso. Arne Bendiksen then joined as a new member. The group's first revue at Chat Noir was a great success, and Egil Monn-Iversen became the permanent conductor at the theater. When Ella Fitzgerald and Dizzy Gillespie toured Europe in the 50s, they went to Chat Noir in Oslo to experience The Monn Keys perform. Nora Brockstedt was successful in the group but wanted to pursue a solo career, and gradually left in 1956.

In 1957, the group established the company Egil Monn-Iversen A/S, owned by the four members and Monn-Iversen. In this company, they created their own record label, Triola. They switched to Triola after making just over forty recordings for Musica and RCA Victor. The group also became radio favorites in programs like Slagerparaden, Lån oss øre and Det ligger i luften – and were also present on the European radio broadcaster Radio Luxemburg. In 1959, Egil Monn-Iversen became the director of Chat Noir, and the group participated in most of the revues there until Monn-Iversen stepped down in 1963.

The Monn Keys released about 20 singles and 15 EPs from 1958 to 1963 on Triola. In the 1960s, The Monn Keys also became stars throughout the Nordic countries through the TV version of Slagerparaden (1960) and the tv show Prospektkortet (1963) both shown by the Nordic broadcaster group, Nordvisionen. The group's Swedish EP release, with the songs "Åh Maria jag vill hem" and "Sucu sucu", was a bestseller in Sweden, topping the Swedish sales charts for three weeks (23/6-7/7 1961).

The Monn Keys were the first Norwegian pop artists to aim internationally. They toured outside the Nordics, releasing LPs like Dreamsville in the US (1960) and Here Are The Monn Keys in Europe (1961). Dreamsville was the first Norwegian pop export to the USA, and the album received good reviews. Special for these American releases was that the music was recorded in the USA, while the vocals were added in Norway. It was the first time that a mix of Norwegian and American musicians was used. Allyn Ferguson was the conductor and arranger of the record, and it consisted of innovative versions of music by Henry Mancini, André Previn and Horace Silver. The record got a revived interest in the LGBTQ-culture in San Francisco in the 1990s, led by the artists at The Tarthouse. The group also released a US single in May 1960 with the songs Early Bird and Wedding Day.

The movie Operasjon Løvsprett (1962) was a continuation of the success in Norway, and with that movie, the group's most famous hit song was launched: «Stakkars store sterke karer». This song was on the VG-lista for nine weeks. Two years later, in 1964, the sequel Operasjon Sjøsprøyt came out. The Monn Keys disbanded later in 1964, but the members continued to mark themselves with solid positions in Norwegian culture and music life for many years after. The Monn Keys were frequently used by Ivo Caprino as a vocal group in short and commercial films.

The Monn Keys were not the first vocal group in Norwegian popular music, but they marked a distinction with their popularity. The group had a mix of strong musicality, revue humor, and strong solo artists. The tradition The Monn Keys started was later continued by the likes of Dizzie Tunes, Gitarkameratene, and Ylvis.

== Selected discography ==
- 2003 – Assortert
- 1968 – Nå er det jul igjen (RCA)
- 1963 – The Monn Keys (Triola)
- 1961 – Here Are The Monn Keys (Warner Bros.) (US-release)
- 1961 – Å! Maria! jag vill hem!
- 1961 – Stackars stora starka karlar
- 1961 – The Monn Keys synger Prøysen
- 1961 – Åh, Marie jeg vil hjem til deg (Triola)
- 1961 – Sucu Sucu (Triola)
- 1960 – Dreamsville (Omega) (US-release)
- 1960 – Lyssna bara till ditt unga hjärta
- 1959 – En glad calypso om våren (Triola)
- 1958 – Tulipaner fra Amsterdam (Triola)
- 1954 – Hei hå nå er det jul igjen (Musica)
- 1951 – Vel møtt igjen (Musica)
