= Godvakker-Maren =

- Directed by: Knut Hergel
- Written by: Knut Hergel; Alf Sommer; Einar Tveito
- Based on: Oskar Braaten's novel Bak høkerens disk and play Godvakker-Maren
- Produced by: Alf Sommer
- Starring: Eva Sletto; Aasta Voss; Pehr Qværnstrøm
- Cinematography: Reidar Lund
- Edited by: Titus Vibe-Müller
- Music by: Adolf Kristoffer Nielsen
- Distributed by: Kommunenes filmcentral
- Release date: October 31, 1940
- Running time: 89 minutes
- Country: Norway
- Language: Norwegian

Godvakker-Maren (Good Pretty Maren) is a Norwegian comedy film from 1940 directed by Knut Hergel, who also wrote the film script together with Alf Sommer and Einar Tveito. The script is based on Oskar Braaten's novel Bak høkerens disk and play Godvakker-Maren. The film premiered on October 31, 1940.

== Plot ==
Two young girls from Hedmark get jobs at a grocery store run by Nils Andresen in Oslo. Andresen's wife is in bed with an illness, and Andresen is interested in his two young female employees. Maren, played by Eva Sletto, is also exposed to other vices in the capital before things settle down.

== Cast ==
- Eva Sletto as Maren
- Pehr Qværnstrøm as Nils Andresen, a grocer
- Dagmar Myhrvold as Matea, Andresen's wife
- Aasta Voss as Inga
- Bjarne Bø as the doctor
- Harald Heide-Steen as Even
- Alf Sommer as Tore
- Einar Tveito as the priest
- Øyvind Øyen as the constable
- Helge Essmar as Aksel
