= Alf Tande-Petersen =

Norwegian television presenter

Alf Tande-Petersen, nicknamed Tande-P (born 9 October 1950), is a Norwegian television personality, journalist, writer and businessperson. In his early career he wrote for newspapers and was a radio presenter, and he has released books in several genres, mostly humor and crime novels. He was also behind various revues and stage shows. As a television presenter he was very successful, peaking in 1992 with the show Tande-På programmet which at times was viewed by almost half of Norway's population. He also had a business venture as a restaurant owner, but after three years the companies went bankrupt.

== Career ==
=== Writing ===
He started as a journalist in 1969, as a sports journalist in Adresseavisen. He also worked three years in Vesterålen. He became known as a writer of humorous texts in the newspaper Dagbladet. Humorous books include Folk og demoner i Løvebakken Monarki (1981), 1984 år'reit (1984), Gjør det! (1986), Tande-P'å Tur: Tjo-fadderittan (1987). He also reworked books by Stephen Pile (author of The Book of Heroic Failures) into Norwegian, in Tidenes tabber (1989) and Flere tabber (1990). He cooperated with Klaus Hagerup, and they released a young adult book in 1989, a humour book in 1991 and a play in 1992. The 1992 humour book På kanten was written together with Tore Skoglund. The 1992 book Det ble en gutt was dedicated to fatherhood, and was one of the first books written about this in a humorous, tongue-in-cheek way which later became a subgenre of sorts. He later switched to crime novels, and has issued Bedre sant enn aldri (1995), Evnukken (1996) and Fisherman's Friend (1999). In 2007 he released three books; the crime novel Fiskene, a humorous book about the Øivind Blunck's persona "Fridtjof" and a non-fiction book about the Operation Archery.

Tande-Petersen has cooperated closely with Øivind Blunck. They first developed the persona Reidar in the 1980s, and later the persona Fridtjof. They have co-written several stage shows, including ... blunk Blunck and Fridtjof for fulle mugger!, as well as the televised mini-movie Fridtjofs Jul. Tande-Petersen has also written various revues, commercials and has been a stage entertainer.

=== Television ===
In television, he has been a mainstay in the Norwegian Broadcasting Corporation. He appeared in the radio program Reiseradioen in 1975, and later hosted several weekend entertainment programs: Tande-På programmet (1992), Go'fot på låven (1992), Tande-På jobb (1993), Opp med Norge! (1994), Sveip (together with Hilde Hummelvoll, 1995–1997), Tande-Potpurri (1997), På'n igjen (1998), Høyt skattet (1999), Ditt livs sjanse (2000) and Hodejegerne (2002–2004). He also hosted the Melodi Grand Prix in 1994, 1996 and 1997, and other annual shows like Komiprisen in 2001.

Tande-På programmet peaked at 1,86 million viewers in a country which in 1990 had 4,247,546 million inhabitants, and there were also two editions with 1.82 million viewers, one edition with 1.71, one with 1.69 and one with 1.60 million viewers. In 1995, these shows occupied the spots three, four, five, seven, eight and nine on the all-time list of viewer ratings in Norwegian television; only the 1994 FIFA World Cup match between Norway and Mexico (1.99 million viewers) and the 1994 Winter Olympics closing ceremony (1.99 million viewers) ranked higher than Tande-Petersen's shows at the time. Hodejegerne peaked at about 1.4 million viewers. In 1992 Tande-Petersen was awarded the Se og Hør readers' TV personality of the year award, together with his co-host, the child Martin Sørensen.

=== Business ===
Tande-Petersen also had a foray into restaurant ownership. Together with two friends, he started the company Tande-P Drift in 2000 and opened restaurants in Trondheim, Verdalsøra, Lillestrøm, Kragerø and Oslo and two in Vormsund. The company went bankrupt in January 2003. The restaurant in Trondheim was taken over by another of his companies, Skauum Drift. Lawyer Gunnar Kvamme was chairman, but he backed out in September the same year, and Tande-Petersen had to take over. That company too went bankrupt, but because of Tande-Petersen's short time as chairman, he was not indicted.

Tande-Petersen has another, eponymously named company, into which the money from his book sales, writing and show performances goes.

== Personal life ==
He grew up in Frøya Municipality, moved to the city of Trondheim at the age of twelve, and resides in Vormsund. He also spends some of his time writing at a cabin in Fjällbacka, Sweden. He is married and has three children, and is also an uncle of skier Petter Tande. In 2008 Tande-Petersen called for celebrities to unveil more of their private life to the media. The logic was that a celebrity himself enters people's private sphere through the television screen or other media. Tande-Petersen had experienced intense media pressure after his involvement in the bankruptcy.

Awards
Preceded by Helge Hammelow-Berg	Se og Hør's TV Personality of the Year; 1992 (together with Martin Sørensen)	Succeeded by Petter Nome
