= Bjørn Breigutu =

Norwegian filmmaker (1924–2004)

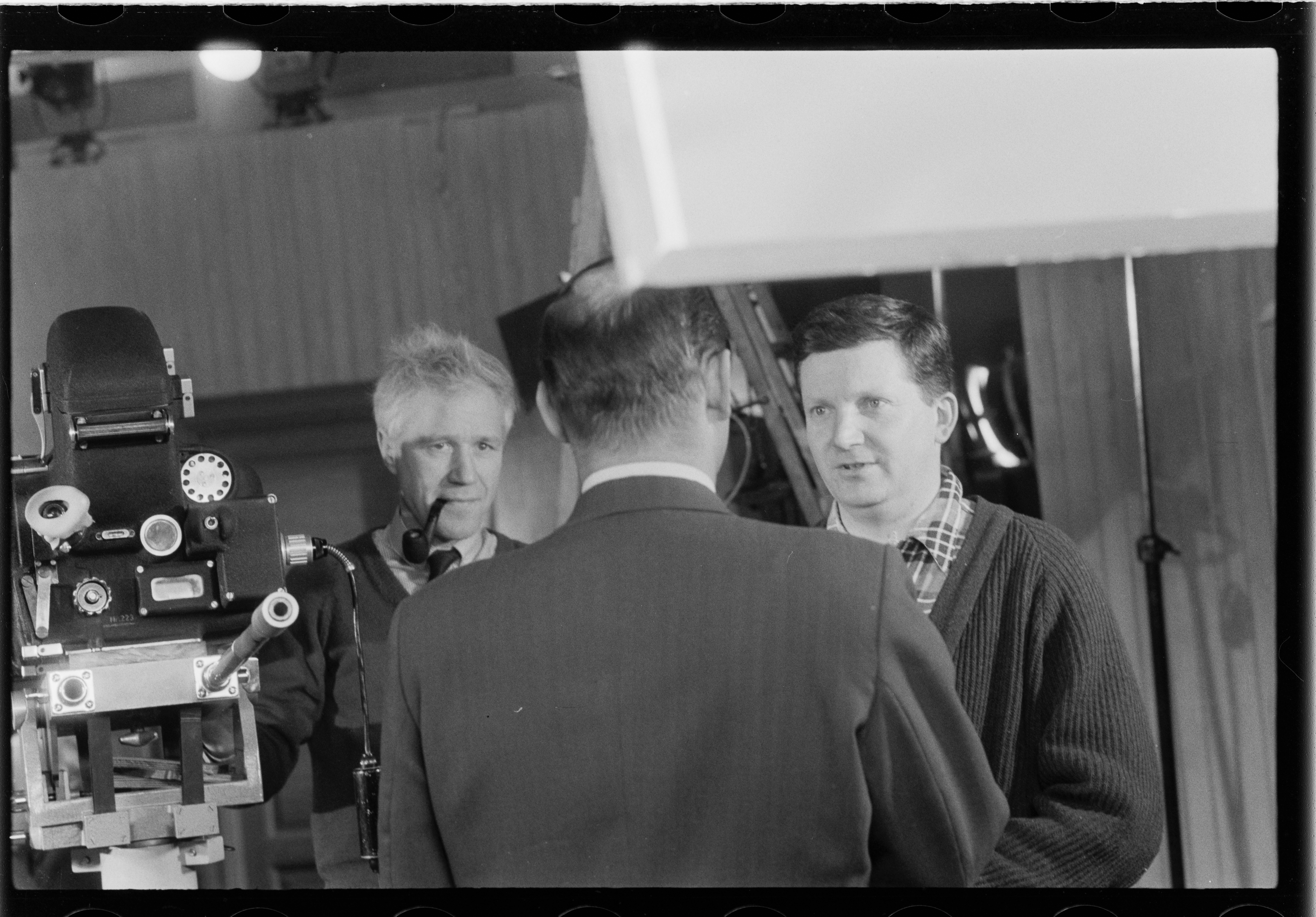
- Bjørn Breigutu (right) with the screenwriter Kjell Aukrust while filming Freske fraspark in 1963
- Born: April 25, 1924
- Died: June 29, 2004 (aged 80)
- Occupations: Actor, director, editor, filmmaker
- Awards: Amanda Award (1985)

Bjørn Breigutu (April 25, 1924 – June 29, 2004) was a Norwegian filmmaker.

== Biography ==
Bjørn Breigutu was trained in drawing at the Norwegian National College of Art and Design. He started working for Norsk Film at Jar outside Oslo in 1946, and he edited his first film in 1950 with Filmavisen. Gradually, he became Arne Skouen's regular editor. Altogether, he edited 26 feature films and directed over 60 short films. As a trade unionist, he helped start the Norwegian Filmmakers Association (Norsk Filmforbund). His work is described by Gunnar Iversen in Portrett av en usynlig mann – Om Bjørn Breigutu og hans filmer (Portrait of an Invisible Man: Bjørn Breigutu and His Films, 1989).

Breigutu was the first to be awarded the Amanda committee's honorary award during the first presentation of the Amanda Award in 1985, and he received the Norwegian Filmmakers Association's honorary award in 1993.

== Awards ==
- 1961: State film scholarship for study abroad
- 1985: Amanda Award, Amanda committee's honorary award
- 1993: Norwegian Filmmakers Association's honorary award

== Filmography ==
- 1948: Kampen om tungtvannet, production participant
- 1949: Døden er et kjærtegn, actor
- 1953: Brudebuketten, director and screenwriter
- 1954: Aldri annet enn bråk, editor
- 1955: Det brenner i natt!, editor
- 1957: Fjols til fjells, editor
- 1957: Ni liv, editor
- 1958: Pastor Jarman kommer hjem, editor
- 1959: Herren og hans tjenere, editor
- 1960: Omringet, editor
- 1961: I faresonen, director
- 1961: Bussen, editor
- 1961: Hans Nielsen Hauge, director
- 1962: Kalde spor, editor
- 1963: Freske fraspark, director and screenwriter
- 1964: Klokker i måneskinn, editor
- 1964: Pappa tar gull, editor
- 1965: Vaktpostene, editor
- 1966: Skrift i sne, editor
- 1966: Reisen til havet, editor
- 1967: Musikanter, editor
- 1969: An-Magritt, editor
- 1970: Solen (short), editor
- 1973: Så de vant vår rett (short)
- 1982: Krypskyttere, editor
- 1983: Hockeyfeber, editor
- 1985: Orions Belte, editor
- 1987: Over grensen, editor
- 1987: Turnaround, editor
- 1988: Folk og røvere i Kardemomme by, editor
