= Langlie =

Langlie is a surname. Notable people with the surname include:

- Arthur B. Langlie, 12th and 14th governor of Washington
- Britt Langlie (born 1945), Norwegian stage actress
