= Magnus Falkberget =

Norwegian actor

- Born: October 10, 1900; Røros Municipality, Norway
- Died: December 4, 1957 (aged 57); Rome, Italy
- Occupation: Actor
- Spouse: Didi Holtermann
- Father: Johan Falkberget
- Relatives: Aasta Falkberget

Magnus Falkberget (October 10, 1900 – December 4, 1957) was a Norwegian actor. He was the founder and artistic director of the Falkberget Theater (Norwegian: Falkbergets teater) from 1929 to 1957.

Falkberget debuted as an actor in 1920, and he worked at the Drabløs Theater, among other venues. In the same year, he played his first and only film role as a neighbor boy in Fante-Anne.

Magnus Falkberget established the Falkberget Theater in 1929 and was its director until its last tour in 1957. The theater received no government support and was known for its popular repertoire. The Falkberget Theater had its greatest success staging Bør Børson with Toralf Sandø in the title role. With its nationwide tours, the theater was a predecessor to the National Traveling Theater (Riksteatret).

Falkberget was the son of the author Johan Falkberget and was married to the actress Didi Holtermann. He was the brother of the writer and painter Aasta Falkberget.

== Filmography ==
- 1920: Fante-Anne
