= Hans Østerholt =

Norwegian politician (1873–1958)

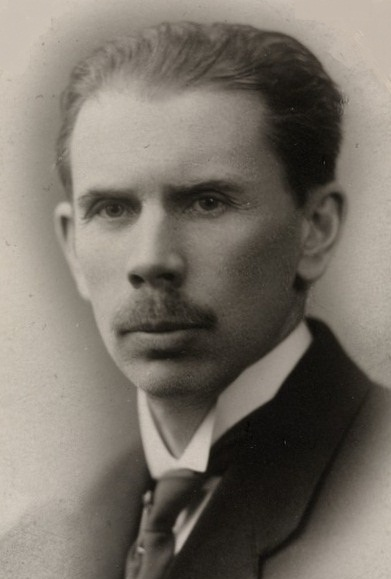
Hans Østerholt

Hans Østerholt (29 August 1873 – 7 November 1958) was a Norwegian trade unionist, editor and politician for the Labour and Social Democratic Labour parties. He is best known for founding the humorous magazine Hvepsen in 1905 and editing it throughout its lifespan, until 1925.

== Early life ==
He was born as Hans Rollefsen in Holden Municipality in Telemark county, Norway, as a son of farmers. After the death of his mother when Rollefsen was aged two, he grew up with his aunt and uncle Guro and Hans Østerholt at the farm Nedre Østerholt. He hence took the surname Østerholt. He finished vocational training at Skiensfjorden School in 1892. He moved to the capital Kristiania, worked at Kongsberg Våpenfabrikk from 1894 to 1895, then back in Kristiania at the mechanical works Nylands Verksted. He was a co-founder of the trade union Instrumentmagernes og Elektrikernes Fagforening and later chaired it. He travelled on a scholarship in Berlin and Chicago between 1898 and 1901.

== Career ==
In 1903 he was elected to the Labour Party's central board, a position he lost in 1906. He was the treasurer of the Norwegian Union of Iron and Metalworkers from 1904 to 1908. However, he was best known as editor of the socialist humorous magazine Hvepsen ("The Wasp"), which he started in 1905 after a fundraiser among trade unions. The magazine is viewed as qualitative and successful during its time, and attracted skilled writers such as Johan Falkberget. In 1916 Østerholt started another magazine as a side project, Blinken ("The Blink"), and in addition he wrote several poems and songs for events in the labour movement. He also started a paper goods store in the party headquarters at Folkets Hus, Kristiania in 1906. Through this he published the annual calendar Arbeiderkalenderen. Hvepsen was also published out of Folkets Hus.

Because of a large work burden, Østerholt had to leave his paper store and Arbeiderkalenderen with the Labour Party in 1913. In 1921, the party split with the Social Democratic Labour Party denouncing the Labour Party line of membership in the Third International. Østerholt joined the Social Democratic Labour Party, and as a result he was evicted from Folkets Hus in 1922. Blinken went defunct that year, and Hvepsen followed in 1925. He was the manager of the Social Democratic Labour Party main newspaper Den nye Social-Demokraten from 1923 to 1925, but after that he left the party press to work in the co-ops. He was the manager of Bryn Co-Op from 1926 to 1930 and the cooperative leaders' association Handelsbestyrerforbundet from 1929 to 1949. He also edited the association's member magazine during that time. He died in November 1958 in Oslo.
