= Aasta Voss =

Norwegian actress (1914–1994)

- Born: October 26, 1914; Volda Municipality, Norway
- Died: May 29, 1994 (aged 79)
- Occupation: Actress

Aasta Voss (October 26, 1914 – May 29, 1994) was a Norwegian actress.

Voss made her debut in 1935 as Georgine in Oskar Braaten's Den store barnedåpen (The Great Baptism) at the Norwegian Theater, where she was later employed, except for two short stays at the Rogaland Theater and the National Traveling Theater. With a sharply realistic feeling, Voss played a number of female roles in Braaten's plays, Nastja in Maxim Gorky's The Lower Depths, Mrs. Buch in Helge Krog's adaptation of Cora Sandel's Kranes konditori (Krane's Café), and Indiana in Olav Duun's Medmenneske (Fellow Man). She also proved to be a confident stylistic artist, including in Federico García Lorca's Yerma and in Bertolt Brecht's The Caucasian Chalk Circle and The Good Person of Szechwan, and in pantomime style in Eugene O'Neill's The Emperor Jones.

She made her film debut as Josefine in Bør Børson Jr. (1938), followed by the role of Inga in Godvakker-Maren (1940) as well as several major and minor supporting roles.

== Filmography ==
- 1938: Bør Børson Jr. as Josefine
- 1940: Godvakker-Maren as Inga
- 1940: Tørres Snørtevold as Betha
- 1951: Kranes konditori as Mrs. Buch
- 1952: Trine!
- 1958: I slik en natt
- 1960: Veien tilbake as Mrs. Arbin
- 1974: Ungen as Lagreta, Julius's mother
