= Hergel =

Hergel is a surname. Notable people with the surname include:

- Knut Hergel (1899–1982), Norwegian actor and theatre director
- Kyle Hergel (born 1999), Canadian-American football player
