= Bjørn Skagestad =

Norwegian actor

- Born: 5 September 1950; Oslo
- Occupation: Actor
- Father: Tormod Skagestad

Bjørn Skagestad (born 5 September 1950) is a Norwegian actor.

== Selected filmography ==
- 1974: Ungen
- 1980: Life and Death
- 1981: Martin
- 1981: The Witch Hunt
- 1992: Lakki
- 1995: Kristin Lavransdatter
