= Sverre Bergli =

Norwegian cinematographer (1926–2021)

- Born: 3 May 1926; Kongsberg, Norway
- Died: 16 November 2021 (aged 95)
- Occupation: Cinematographer
- Notable work: Ut av mørket (1958); Bussen (1961); Bør Børson Jr. (1973)

Sverre Bergli (3 May 1926 – 16 November 2021) was a Norwegian cinematographer.

== Life and career ==
Bergli was born in Kongsberg on 3 May 1926. Among his films are Ut av mørket from 1958, Bussen from 1961, and Bør Børson Jr. from 1973. He later worked for the Norwegian Broadcasting Corporation.

Bergli died on 16 November 2021, at the age of 95.

== Selected filmography ==
- 1952: Vi vil skilles
- 1954: Kasserer Jensen
- 1957: Slalåm under himmelen
- 1958: Ut av mørket
- 1959: 5 loddrett
- 1961: Bussen
- 1961: Sønner av Norge
- 1961: Et øye på hver finger
- 1968: Snow Treasure
- 1973: Bør Børson Jr.
- 1974: Ungen
