= Helge Hammelow-Berg =

Norwegian television personality (born 1949)

Helge Hammelow-Berg (born 25 April 1949) is a Norwegian television personality.

He is best known for hosting 446 editions of the TVNorge show Reisesjekken, the last in 1997. From 1997 to 2002 he was contracted to TV 2, where he received a paycheck without ever hosting a show.

In 1991 he was awarded the Se og Hør readers' TV personality of the year award.

He resides in Melsomvik.

Awards
Preceded by Hallvard Flatland	Se og Hør's TV Personality of the Year; 1991	Succeeded by Alf Tande-Petersen, Martin Sørensen
