= Hilde Hummelvoll =

Norwegian television personality (born 1960)

Hilde Hummelvoll (born 9 October 1960) is a Norwegian television personality.

She hails from Hamar, and has an education from the teachers' college there. She was hired in Norwegian Broadcasting Corporation radio in the regional department, before moving to television in 1985. Her first program was a documentary about PS Skibladner. In the same year she co-hosted TV-aksjonen together with Einar Lunde and Per Erik Borge. Her breakthrough came as co-host (with Knut Borge) of Lørdagsrarieté in 1990. In 1995 she was awarded the Se og Hør readers' TV personality of the year award. She won Gullruten awards in 2002 for hosting Forandring fryder and in 2004 for hosting Venneprøven. Other programs hosted by her include Sommeråpent, Sveip (together with Alf Tande-Petersen), two Amanda award shows, Liv og lyst, Frokost-TV, På'n igjen, I Hummels vold, Og så var det deg, da, Kvelden før kvelden, Dyrisk, Kaoskontroll and Matlyst (2010).

In January 2009 she married television colleague Petter Nome. They reside in Ånnerud in Asker.

Awards
Preceded by Rolv Wesenlund	Se og Hør's TV Personality of the Year; 1995	Succeeded by Tore Strømøy
