= Den fjerde nattevakt =

Book by Johan Falkberget

Den fjerde nattevakt (transl. The Fourth Night Watch) is a novel by the Norwegian writer Johan Falkberget published in 1923. The work was the author's breakthrough novel, is considered one of his main works, and is part of several selections of Norway's literary canon.

The plot is set in Røros in the years from 1807 onward. The main characters are the priest Benjamin Sigismund, his wife Katrine, the sexton Ol-Kanelesa (Ole Korneliussen), the miner's wife Gunhild Bonde, and her husband David Finne.

Benjamin arrives at Bergstaden at the beginning of the novel, and quickly establishes himself as a popular priest. The sexton, fiddler, and blacksmith Ol-Kanelesa becomes his mentor. The development of his character and Christian faith to become a priest for the workers and peasants is one of two main themes in the novel. The second theme is Benjamin and Gunhild's devastating love affair, which leads to Katrine's breakdown and death, David's suicide, and the two lovers' remorse, suffering, and chastening.

The title of the novel refers to the fact that Jesus came walking on the sea toward the disciples during the fourth watch of the night, in their time of need. Per Amdam writes in Norges litteraturhistorie (Norwegian Literary History, 1975) that "The suffering reshapes, refines, and liberates Benjamin and Gunhild—like Ol-Kanelesa—so they appear as whole personalities, identical with their best qualities .... This is how Benjamin also becomes a representative of humanity in its greatness and weakness."

The novel was adapted for theater by Carl Fredrik Engelstad and it was first staged at the Norwegian Theater in 1956. A 1960 film was based on the novel with a script written by Aasta Falkberget.
