= Aasta Falkberget =

Norwegian writer and painter

- Born: March 15, 1905; Røros Municipality, Norway
- Died: March 3, 1983 (aged 77); Oslo, Norway
- Occupation(s): Writer, painter
- Father: Johan Falkberget
- Relatives: Magnus Falkberget

Aasta Falkberget (March 15, 1905 – March 3, 1983) was a Norwegian writer and painter.

== Family ==
Aasta Falkberget was born in Røros Municipality, Norway, the daughter of the writer Johan Falkberget (1879–1967) and his wife Anna Marie Skjølsvold (1880–1960). She was the sister of the actor Magnus Falkberget.

She was first married on October 14, 1926 in Røros Church to the pastor Aksel Sæsbøe (1893–1972) and she was called Aasta Vaarsnø Falkberget at the time of the marriage. That marriage was later dissolved. She married for the second time in 1940 to Sverre Alfred Fredriksen (1910–1990).

== Life and work ==
Falkberget wrote small contributions for newspapers and magazines early in her career. Her literary debut is considered a story that was published in Arbeidermagasinet no. 4 in 1928. That same year, she contributed to the Norwegian Missionary Society's Christmas publication.

In 1939, she prepared a film script for her father's breakthrough novel Den fjerde nattevakt. The book was first filmed in 1960, based on a new script she completed in 1958.

She also worked as an artist, and she made her debut at the Autumn Exhibition in 1936. Among other things, she held painting exhibitions in Røros.

Later in life, she wrote two memoires. Both of these books are about her parents' lives. The first of them, Far og mor i unge år (Father and Mother in Their Young Years), was published in 1971. It describes Johan Falkberget's upbringing, his life as a writer in Kristiania (now Oslo), and how he met Anna Marie Skjølsvold. The second book, I Trondalen og på Ratvolden (In Trondalen and at Ratvolden), was published in 1974. In that book, she describes life on the family farm Ratvolden in Rugldalen near Røros. This was Johan Falkberget's childhood village, and the family moved there in 1922. Both of these narratives are collected in the book Minner (Memories) from 1979.

== Bibliography ==
- 1958: Script for the film Den fjerde nattevakt
- 1971: Far og mor i unge år
- 1974: I Trondalen og på Ratvolden
- 1979: Minner
