= Mysen =

Administrative center and city in Østfold, Norway

Coordinates: 59°33′N 11°20′E

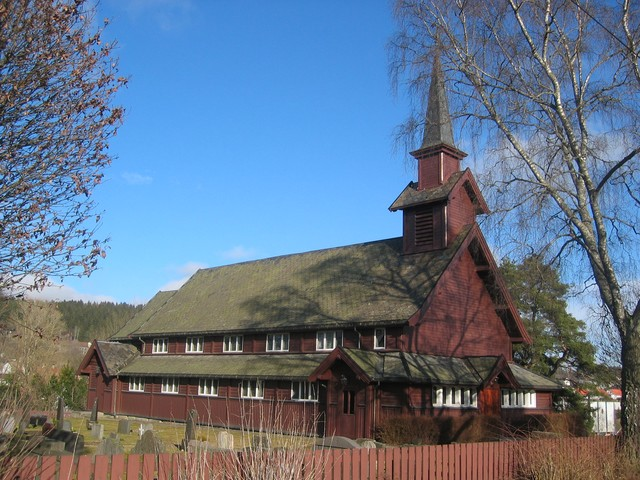
Mysen Church

Mysen is the administrative center of the municipality of Eidsberg in the county of Østfold in Norway.

The town is named after the old farm of Mysen (Norse Mysin, from *Mosvin), since the town is built on its ground. The first element is mosi m 'bog, marsh', and the last element is vin m 'meadow, pasture'.

== History ==
During the Second World War, there was a Nazi concentration camp at Mysen. One camp commandant was Hans Aumeier, who was later tried and convicted at the Auschwitz Trial.

== Notable people from Mysen ==
- Jan Garbarek, musician
- Atle Næss, author
- Eva Røine, psychologist and author
- Brage Vastevik, gravity mountain biker

== See also ==
- Momarken, a racecourse just north of Mysen
