= Petter Nome =

Norwegian television personality (1954–2024)

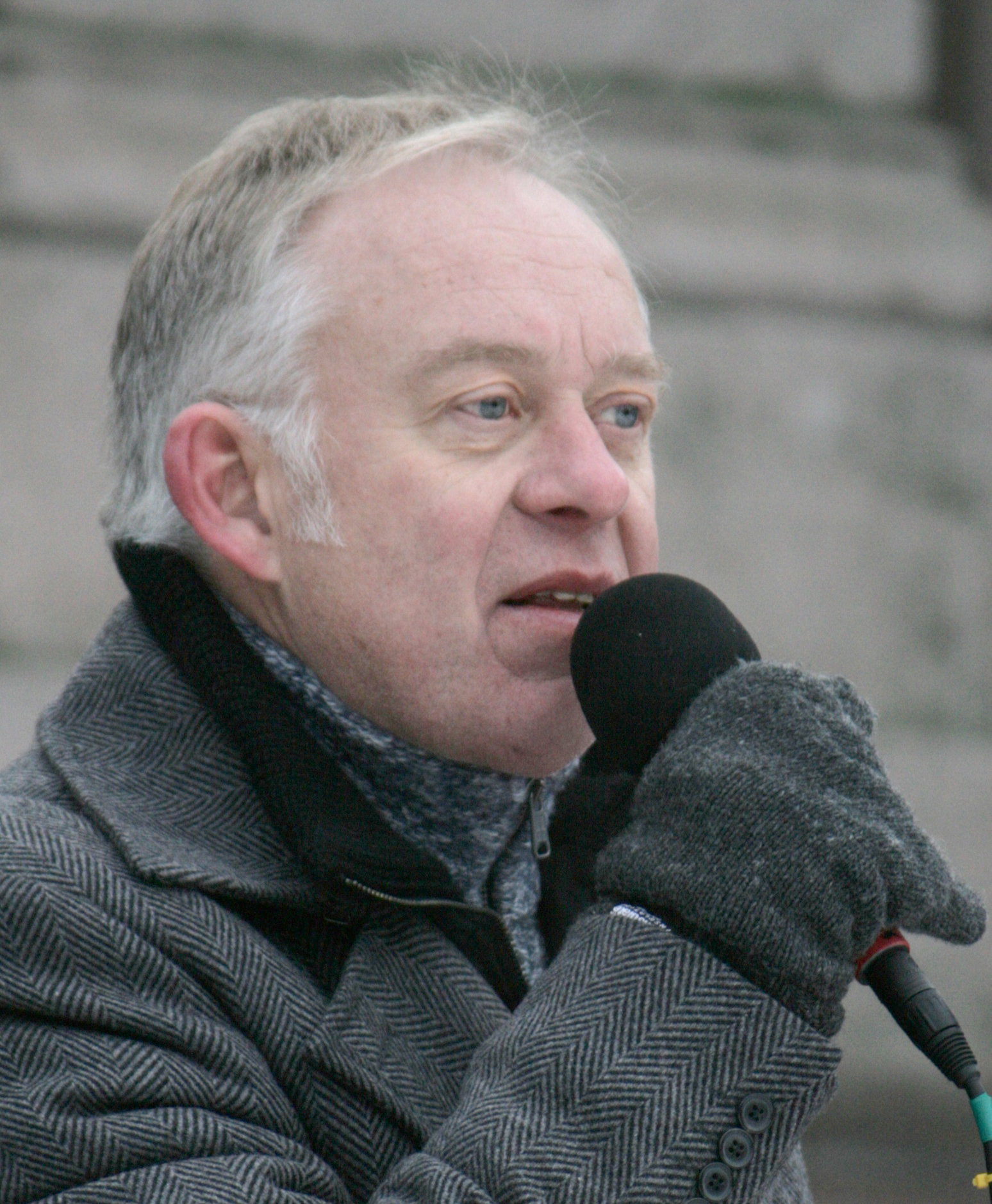
Petter Nome (2011)

Petter Nome (18 July 1954 – 5 June 2024) was a Norwegian television personality, journalist and organisational worker.

== Life and career ==
Nome was born in Kristiansand, but grew up at Kampen and Ila. He did his secondary education at Oslo Cathedral School, worked odd jobs on land and at sea and studied criminology at the University of Oslo. In 1978, he was hired as a journalist at Arbeiderbladet. He later co-founded the local radio station Radio Oslo. He started working for the Norwegian Broadcasting Corporation in 1984.

Nome was a news anchor on Dagsrevyen, and later presented a number of weekend entertainment shows: Zikk Zakk, Zting, Nomes Ark, Rondo, Åpent Hus, Sommeråpent, På'n igjen (with Hilde Hummelvoll), No'me Nome, Gringos and XYZ. He hosted TV-aksjonen in 1990, the Melodi Grand Prix in 1995, Momarkedet in 1999, the millennium countdown show in 2000, as well as three Amanda award shows. In 1993 he was awarded the Se og Hør readers' TV personality of the year award. He served on several boards, including Vålerenga IF Fotball, Oslo Domkor, Solo-fondet and the Sophie Prize.

In 2002 and 2003, he was an outspoken opponent of the Iraq War. In early January 2003 he created the campaign "Hello America!", in which he and other signatories asked people to send e-mails to "American News Media" and the US presidential and vice presidential offices, where they lamented the prospect of an Iraq War. This led to conflicting views with the Norwegian Broadcasting Corporation, and he was relieved of the host job of 2003's edition of Sommeråpent, and quit his job at NRK not long thereafter. He was hired as director of communications in the Norwegian Refugee Council. He was re-hired to work with the Norwegian Broadcasting Corporation breakfast television show Frokost-TV from 2006. The show was cancelled in 2008. In 2009 he was hired as managing director of the Norwegian Brewers and Soft Drinks Producers.

In January 2009 he married television colleague Hilde Hummelvoll. They lived in Ånnerud in Asker.

Nome died from cancer on 5 June 2024, at the age of 69.

Awards
Preceded by Alf Tande-Petersen	Se og Hør's TV Personality of the Year; 1993	Succeeded by Rolv Wesenlund
