= Eva Røine =

Norwegian psychologist, author and actress (1928–2026)

- Born: December 11, 1928; Mysen, Norway
- Died: July 10, 2026 (aged 97)
- Occupations: Actress, psychologist, author

Eva Røine (December 11, 1928 – July 10, 2026) was a Norwegian actress, psychologist, author and beauty pageant titleholder.

== Life and career ==
Røine was born in Mysen, the daughter of the dentist Thorbjørn Sverre Røine (1896–1962) and Sigrid Bergliot Lund (1894–1962). In her younger years she worked as an actress and journalist, and she was the first Miss Norway, participating in the Miss Universe 1952 competition in the United States. She studied theater for two years in London and was then employed at the People's Theater in Oslo, where she performed from its opening in 1952 to 1955. From 1955 to 1959 she worked as a journalist for the newspaper Dagbladet. She was the press secretary at the National Theater in Oslo from 1963 to 1968. Røine earned certificates in criminology and theater studies, and she received a master's degree in psychology in 1976. She worked at Ullevål University Hospital's psychiatric and children's department, and at the psychiatric hospital in Modum, and she became a clinical psychology specialist in 1985. She was married to the football player and journalist Jørgen Juve (1906–1983).

Røine died on July 10, 2026, at the age of 97.

== Psychodrama activity ==
In the early 1970s, Røine became acquainted with the psychotherapeutic method of psychodrama, including in the United States. A crucial meeting was with the creator of the method, the psychiatrist, philosopher, and poet Jacob L. Moreno (1889–1984). When Røine was employed at the psychiatric department at Ullevål University Hospital, she was given a separate theater in the basement for the patients and guidance of the staff. In 1985, she was engaged at the Open Theater (Det Åpne Teater) by the entrepreneur Anne-May Nilsen, where she participated in script preparations and rehearsals. In 1986, Røine and her colleague Monica Westberg founded the Norwegian Psychodrama School (Norsk Psykodramaskole, since 1992 called the Norwegian Psychodrama Institute, Norsk Psykodramainstitutt), now headquartered in Oslo. Røine was the general manager from 1986 to 2004. She was vice-chairperson of the Psychodrama Institute for Europe (now the Psychodrama Association for Europe) from 1991 to 2004. She worked with education in psychodrama in many countries, mainly in eastern Europe.

== Bibliography ==
- Teaterkunnskap (Oslo: Elingaard brevskole, 1965 ) with Erik Pierstorff and Karl Ludvig Bugge
- Psykodrama – psykoterapi som eksperimentelt teater (Oslo: Aschehoug, 1978), republished as Psykodrama: Om å spille hovedrollen i sitt eget liv (Oslo: Artemis, 1992), translated into English (Psychodrama: Group Psychotherapy as Experimental Theatre) and Polish

== Filmography ==
- 1952: Trine! as Trine
