= Trine! =

- Directed by: Toralf Sandø
- Written by: Hans Geelmuyden; Toralf Sandø
- Based on: Hans Geelmuyden's novel Trine!
- Produced by: Ernst Ottersen
- Starring: Eva Røine; Frank Robert
- Cinematography: Per Gunnar Jonson
- Music by: Hans Geelmuyden; Fred Thunes
- Distributed by: Merkur Film
- Release date: December 26, 1952
- Running time: 98 minutes
- Country: Norway
- Language: Norwegian

Trine! is a Norwegian black-and-white drama film from 1952 directed by Toralf Sandø. Eva Røine starred in the title role. The film was based on Hans Geelmuyden's novel Trine!, and Geelmuyden wrote the script for the film together with Sandø.

== Plot ==
Per Gjerpen works as a salesman and accountant. One day he sees Trine while he is out on a sales tour. He buys her two lottery tickets. This is the beginning of a contact that later deepens into a love affair. The couple discovers that they have won a house in the lottery, but it later turns out not to be true. The numbers were read incorrectly. Instead, they are able to use a house owned by Aunt Andrea. Trine goes to visit Andrea, who is ill, and Per grows lonely in the house. Then complications begin.

== Cast ==
- Eva Røine as Trine
- Frank Robert as Per Gjerpen
- Jørn Ording as Jens Gulbrandsen
- Christina Lundquist as Effi May Palmer
- Margit Brataas as Gurine
- Erna Schøyen as Mrs. Hatlezet, Trine's mother
- Sigrun Otto as Mrs. Jahnfeldt, Jens's mother
- Liv Uchermann Selmer as Aunt Andrea
- Brita Bigum as Miss Svingvoll
- Mona Hofland as Miss Jørgensen
- Sigurd Magnussøn as Pandahl, an auditor
- Ulf Selmer as Uncle Joachim
- Alf Malland as a policeman
- Aasta Voss
- Edel Stenberg
- Torhild Lindal
- Jan Voigt
- Øivind Johnssen
- Rolf Just Nilsen
- Oscar Amundsen
- Karin Hox
- Harald Aimarsen
