= Arne Wold =

Norwegian editorial cartoonist (1895–1987)

Arne Wold (26 September 1895 – 19 October 1987) was a Norwegian journalist and illustrator.

He was born in Kristiania. He took his education at the Norwegian National Academy of Craft and Art Industry between 1911 and 1916, studying under Philip Barlag, Eivind Nielsen, Hans Ødegaard and Johan Nordhagen. He then spent two years at Christiania Clichéanstalt. He was hired in the newspaper Nationen in 1919, where he worked as an illustrator until 1974. After a stay in Florence in 1922, he also worked as an art critic in Nationen from 1922 to 1961. He also illustrated books, Christmas magazines and periodicals. Some of his illustrations were released as books, and they have been used by later scholars to illustrate reactions to political debates. He also drew comics, for instance a Bør Børson comic series in the magazine Nynorsk Vekeblad.

At his death in autumn 1987 he was called "the last of the pioneers of newspaper illustration".
