= Margit Brataas =

Norwegian actress (1903–1971)

- Born: December 28, 1903; Kristiania (now Oslo), Norway
- Died: December 17, 1971 (aged 67)
- Resting place: Vestre gravlund
- Occupation: Actress

Margit Brataas (née Karlsen, December 28, 1903 – December 17, 1971) was a Norwegian actress.

Brataas was born in Kristiania (now Oslo), the daughter of Svend Marus Karlsen (1882–?) and Hilma Mathilde Karlsen (1877–?). She made her film debut in 1942 in Toralf Sandø's film Det æ'kke te å tru, followed by Vi gifter oss (1951), Trine! (1952), and Balladen om mestertyven Ole Høiland (1970). She also performed at the People's Theater in Oslo.

== Filmography ==
- 1942: Det æ'kke te å tru as Gina, a dancer
- 1951: Vi gifter oss as Hansen's housekeeper
- 1952: Trine! as Gurine
- 1970: Balladen om mestertyven Ole Høiland
