= Atle Næss =

Norwegian author (born 1949)

Atle Næss (born 25 March 1949, in Mysen) is a Norwegian author. His book Galileo Galilei, when the world stood still was the winner of The Brage Prize.

== Works ==
- Gun (1975)
- April (1977)
- 830 S (1981)
- Opp fra det absolutte nullpunkt (1985)
- Sensommer (1987)
- Korsfareren (1988)(crime novel)
- Kraften som beveger (1990) The Power that Moves
- Østre linje (1994)
- Den tvilende Thomas (1997)
- Innersvinger (2002)
- Galileo Galilei, when the world stood still (2004)
- Sensommer (2006)
- Roten av minus en (2006)
- Din nestes eiendom (2009)
