= Afrikaneren =

- Directed by: Barthold Halle
- Written by: Sigurd Evensmo
- Starring: Earle Hyman; Wenche Foss; Lise Fjeldstad; Gisle Straume; Stein Winge; Pål Johannessen
- Release date: 1966
- Running time: 97 minutes
- Country: Norway
- Language: Norwegian

Afrikaneren (English: The African) is a 1966 Norwegian drama film directed by Barthold Halle, starring Earle Hyman and Wenche Foss. It deals with Raymond, a young South African studying in Norway.

== Cast ==
- Earle Hyman as Raymond
- Wenche Foss as Mrs. Hilde Vasser
- Lise Fjeldstad as Elin Vasse
- Gisle Straume as Bent Vasser
- Stein Winge as Werner, Elins kjæreste / Elin's boyfriend
- Pål Johannessen as Prikken, Elins lillebror / Elin's little brother

== Ratings ==
Afrikaneren (English: The African) has received limited audience feedback. On IMDb, the film holds a user rating of 6.6 out of 10, indicating a mixed to moderately positive reception among viewers.
