= Barn av solen =

1955 Norwegian comedy film

- Directed by: Arne Skouen
- Written by: Arne Skouen
- Starring: Henny Moan; Rut Fredriksen; Arne Jacobsen
- Release date: 7 October 1955
- Running time: 73 minutes
- Country: Norway
- Language: Norwegian

Barn av solen (English: Children of the Sun) is a 1955 Norwegian comedy film directed by Arne Skouen, starring Henny Moan, Rut Fredriksen, and Arne Jacobsen.
