= Bladet Vesterålen =

Norwegian daily newspaper

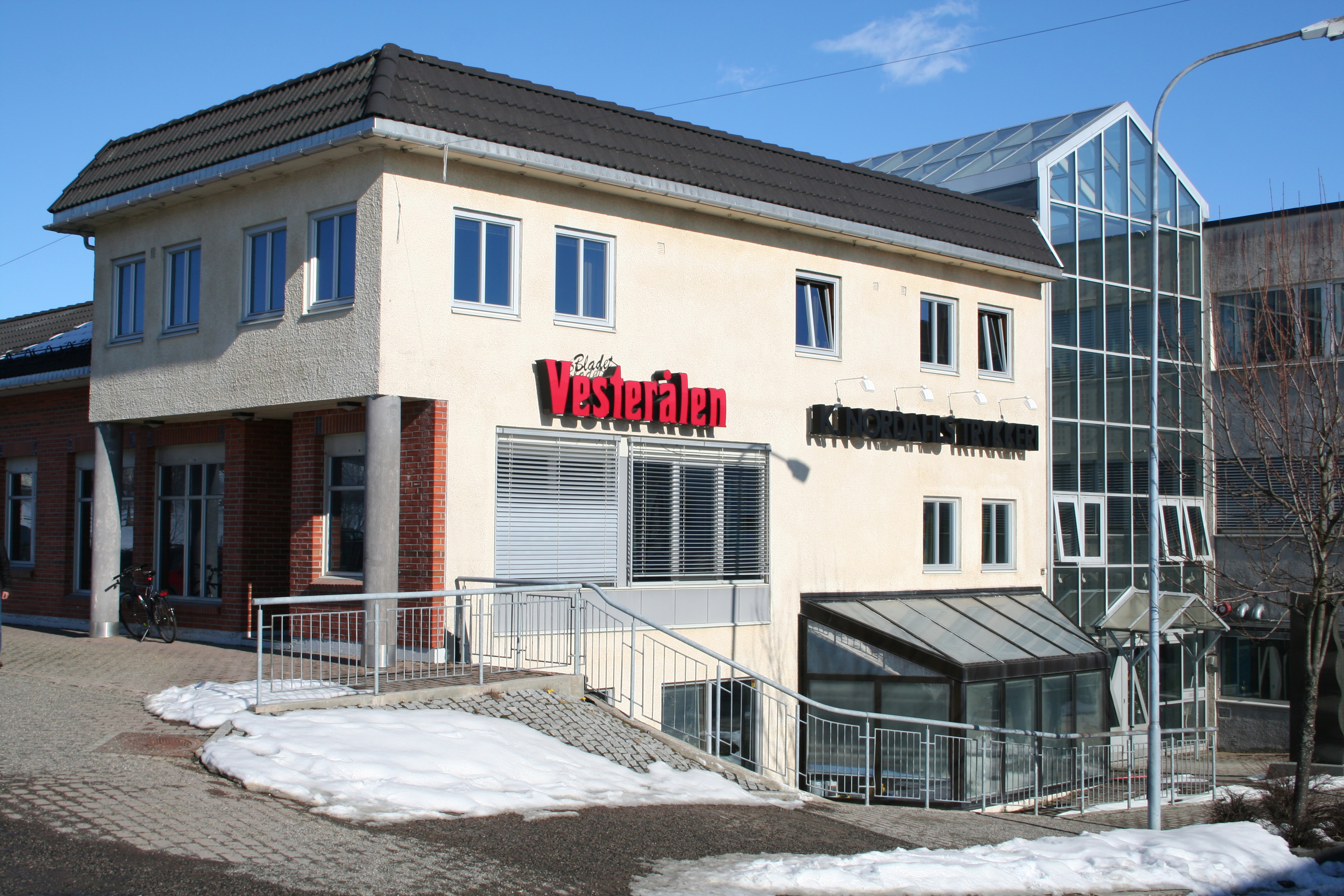
Bladet Vesterålen

Bladet Vesterålen is a Norwegian daily newspaper published in Sortland, Norway. It is the predominant newspaper in the Vesterålen region.

== History and profile ==
The newspaper was founded in 1921, and its first editor was Casper Rønning. As of 2022 the editor-in-chief is Karl-Einar Nordahl.
