= Putti Plutti Pott and Santa's Beard =

Norwegian musical for children

Putti Plutti Pott and Santa's Beard (original Norwegian title: Putti Plutti Pott og Julenissens Skjegg) is a Norwegian children's musical written by Per Asplin. It has become a Norwegian cultural institution. It originally appeared as a Christmas album in 1969, but in 1970 NRK, the Norwegian national broadcaster, televised a staged version starring Asplin. This version was broadcast every year for decades.Asplin, Per (1993). Putti Plutti Pott og julenissens skjegg [Putti Plutti Pott and Santa's Beard] (in Norwegian). Norway: Schibsted. p. 5. ISBN 8251615143. In 1987 Asplin again starred in a traveling big-budget stage production. This continued until his death in 1996. There are now annual productions in many Norwegian cities throughout the holiday season.

== Story ==
Putti Plutti Pott, who is Santa's grandchild, steals Santa's beard while it's hanging out to dry. He is transported from Nisseland (Santa's Village) to our world. If he doesn't get back with the beard, Christmas won't come.

== Sources ==
- http://www.oslospektrum.no/putti-plutti-pott.272036-30696.html
