= Barthold Halle =

Norwegian theatre director (1925–2025)

Barthold Johan Halle
- Born: 22 May 1925; Horten, Norway
- Died: 12 February 2025 (aged 99)
- Occupation: Theatre director
- Children: Morten Halle

Barthold Johan Halle (22 May 1925 – 12 February 2025) was a Norwegian stage instructor, film director and theatre director.

== Life and career ==
Halle worked for Studioteatret from 1947, was stage instructor at Rogaland Teater from 1949 to 1952, and joined Folketeatret from 1952 to 1959. He directed the films Afrikaneren from 1966, and Ungen from 1974. He was theatre director at Oslo Nye Teater from 1978 to 1984. He was decorated Knight, First Class of the Order of St. Olav in 2002.

Halle died on 12 February 2025, at the age of 99. He was the father of jazz musician Morten Halle.
