= Struggle for Eagle Peak =

1960 film

- Directed by: Tancred Ibsen
- Written by: Tancred Ibsen; Arnulf Øverland
- Produced by: Bjarne Stokland
- Starring: Alf Malland
- Cinematography: Ragnar Sørensen
- Edited by: Sølve Kern
- Release date: 1960
- Running time: 90 minutes
- Country: Norway
- Language: Norwegian

Struggle for Eagle Peak (Norwegian: Venner) is a 1960 Norwegian crime film directed by Tancred Ibsen. It was entered into the 10th Berlin International Film Festival.

== Cast ==
- Alf Malland as Tomas Gran
- Tor Stokke as Harry Smidt
- Eva Bergh as Edna Gran
- Ingerid Vardund as Vera Ruud, journalist
- Einar Sissener as Redaktøren
- Ola Isene as Overlegen
- Wilfred Breistrand as the senior resident attending physician
