= Per Asplin =

Norwegian actor and musician (1928–1996)

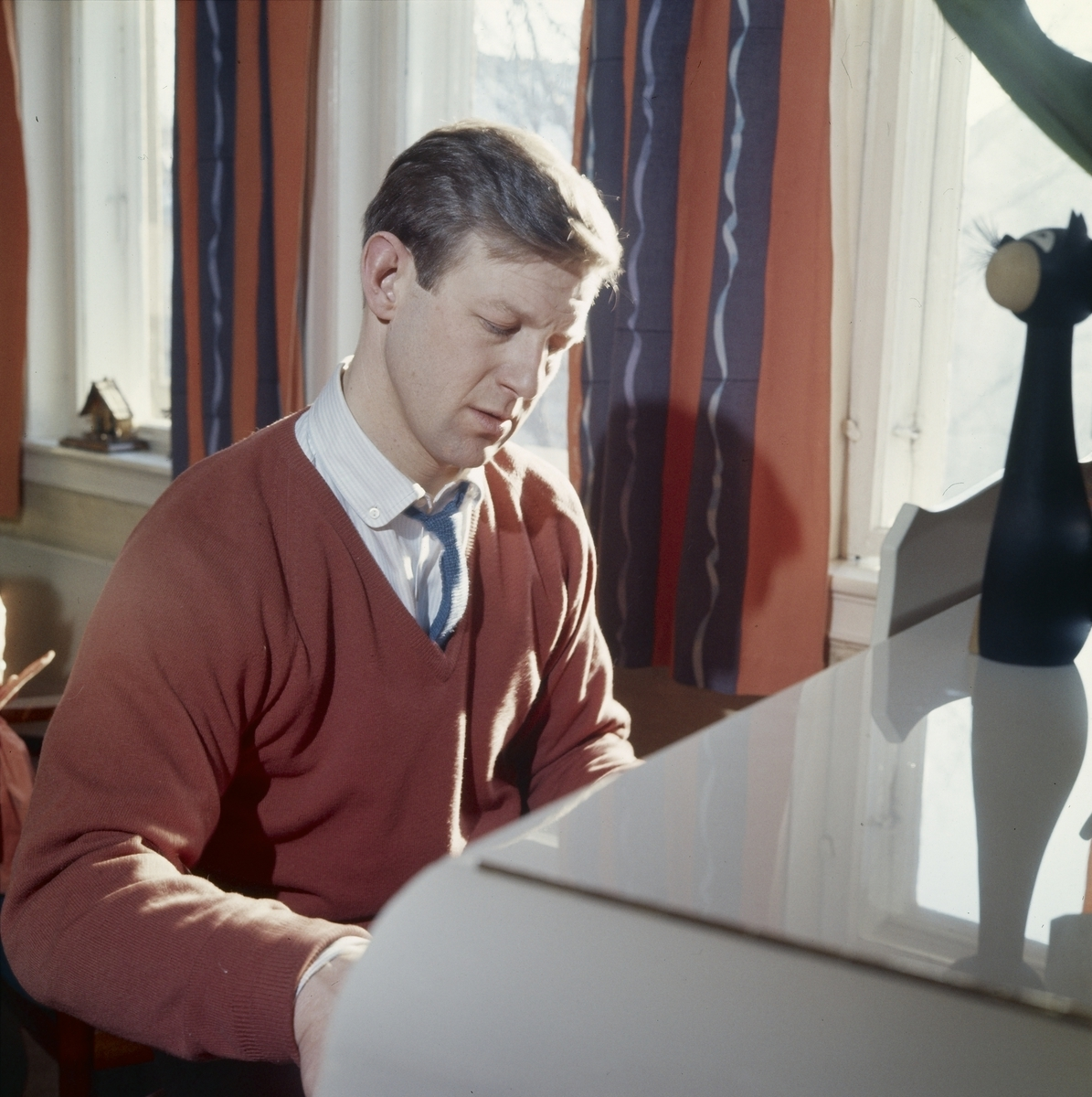

Background information
- Born: 10 August 1928
- Died: 9 October 1996 (aged 68)
- Instrument: piano

Per Asplin (10 August 1928 – 9 October 1996) was a Norwegian-Danish pianist, singer, composer and actor, born in Tønsberg. He co-starred in a handful of films as well as participating in Melodi Grand Prix five times in the 1960s. He is still probably best remembered as a member of the Norwegian vocal group The Monn Keys and for creating the annual Christmas show Putti Plutti Pott and Santa's Beard. He died in Oslo.
