= Bør Børson Jr. (1974 film) =

- Directed by: Jan Erik Düring
- Written by: Johan Falkberget; Harald Tusberg
- Starring: Rolv Wesenlund; Britt Langlie; Sølvi Wang
- Music by: Egil Monn-Iversen
- Release date: 7 February 1974
- Running time: Norway: 175 minutes
- Country: Norway
- Language: Norwegian

Bør Børson Jr. is a 1974 Norwegian musical film directed by Jan Erik Düring, starring Rolv Wesenlund, Britt Langlie and Sølvi Wang. The film is an adaptation of the musical theatre Bør Børson jr based on a novel by Johan Falkberget.

Bør Børson Jr. (Wesenlund) is a peasant son with great ambitions. He starts a grocery store and – after some initial problems – makes a good deal of money. He then leaves for Oslo, where he makes a fortune in the stock trade. Eventually, he returns to his hometown, where he holds a lavish wedding with his childhood sweetheart.

The film contained popular songs such as "Å æ kjinne ein kar", "Børs Song" and "Wienerbrød-tango", first introduced at the stage version of the musical in 1972.
