= Surrounded (1960 film) =

- Directed by: Arne Skouen
- Written by: Arne Skouen
- Starring: Rolf Kirkvaag; Alf Malland; Ivar Svendsen; Kari Øksnevad
- Cinematography: Finn Bergan
- Edited by: Bjørn Breigutu
- Music by: Gunnar Sønstevold
- Distributed by: Norsk Film A/S
- Release date: September 12, 1960
- Running time: 75 minutes
- Country: Norway
- Language: Norwegian

Surrounded (Norwegian: Omringet) is a Norwegian film from 1960 directed by Arne Skouen.

== Plot ==
The film describes how the resistance fighter Per, modeled on Knut Haugland, operated an illegal telegraph station on the roof of the National Hospital in 1944 during the Second World War.

== Cast ==
- Ivar Svendsen as Per
- Kari Øksnevad as Anne Aulie
- Rolf Kirkvaag as Tore Aulie
- Alf Malland as Frimann
- Henny Moan as Frimann's girlfriend
- Sverre Holm as Tyrihans
- Egil Hjorth-Jenssen as Eliassen, the concierge
- Eva Rødland as Ingeborg, an actress
- Kari Simonsen
- Tom Tellefsen as Guttorm
- Kjetil Bang-Hansen as a courier
- Aud Schønemann as a nurse
- Julie Øksnes
- Sverre Shetling
- Tor Erik Mathiesen
- Jon Berle
- Jens Gjersløv
- Helena Krag
- Gry Enger
- Erik Melbye Brekke
- Edith Aadland
- Tørres Aadland
- Gordon Martin
- Eileen Smmott
- August Fromm
- Detman Loidelt
- Franz Faber
- Tor Erik Mathisen
