= Oskar Braaten =

Norwegian novelist and playwright

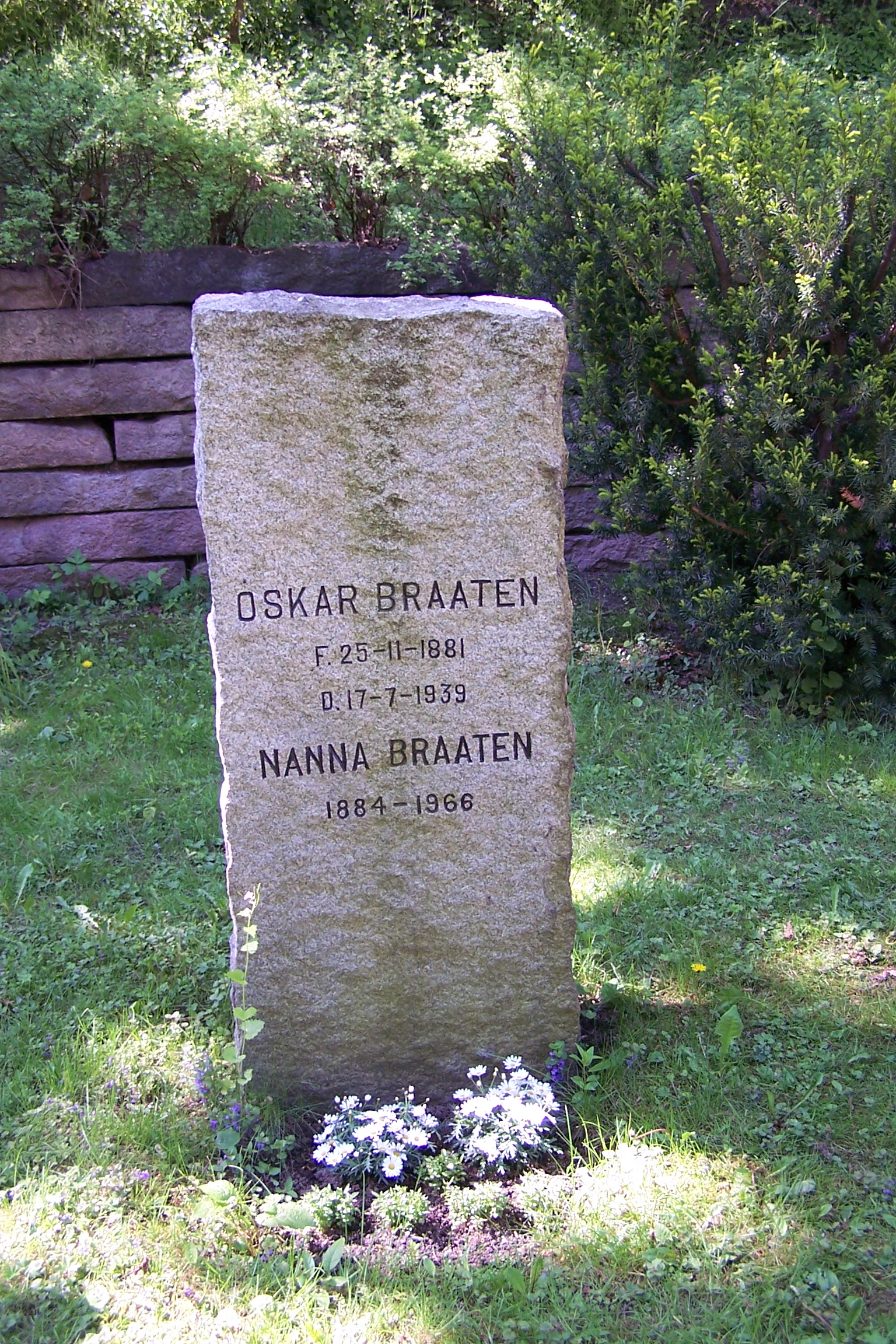
Grave of Oskar Braaten

Oskar Braaten (25 November 1881 – 17 July 1939) was a Norwegian novelist and playwright.

== Biography ==
Oskar Alexander Braaten was born in the Oslo borough of Sagene, one of Norway's oldest industrial areas, dating to the mid-19th century. Oskar Braaten attended school in Sagene until he was 15 years old. In 1899, he was hired by the antiquarian bookstore Bertrand Jensen, where he remained until 1910.

Though born and raised in Oslo, Braaten joined the mostly rural landsmål-movement. Braaten is best known for his popular plays and novels depicting the lives of factory workers alongside the Akerselva in Oslo. He published seven novels between 1917 and 1925. Braaten conveys a new image of Oslo not seen before in literature. Braaten was able to provide vivid and richly nuanced images of working-class life on the east side of Oslo during a historical period of industrialization. Criticism of injustice and inequality arises, but there is relatively little political tendency in his literary works.

He served as an advisor and theater manager at the Det Norske Teatret in Oslo from its start in 1915 until his death. He was a consultant for the theater 1915–25, served as its theater director (Teatersjef) from 1934 to 1936, and was dramatic performance manager from 1937 until his death. He was editor of For Bygd og By in 1912 and co-editor of St. Hallvard in 1933. Braaten was the chairman of the Norwegian Authors' Union (Den norske forfatterforening) at the end of 1921/22 and again in 1933.

== Personal life ==
Oskar Braaten and Nanna Thorvaldsen were married in 1910. Oskar and Nanna had a son Bjorn in 1912, and daughter Berit in 1918. In 1921, the family moved to Ullevål Hageby, a residential area in the Nordre Aker borough of Oslo.

== Selected works ==
- 1910: Kring fabrikken (Around the Factory)
- 1911: Ungen (The Child)
- 1918: Bak høkerens disk (Behind the Shopkeeper's Counter)
- 1918: Fabrikken (The Factory)
- 1919: Ulvehiet (The Wolf's Lair)
- 1925: Den store barnedåpen (The Great Christening)
- 1927: Godvakker-Maren (Good Pretty Maren)

Cultural offices
Preceded by Hans Jacob Nilsen	Director of the Det Norske Teatret; 1934–1936	Succeeded by Knut Hergel
