= Knut Hergel =

Norwegian actor and theatre director

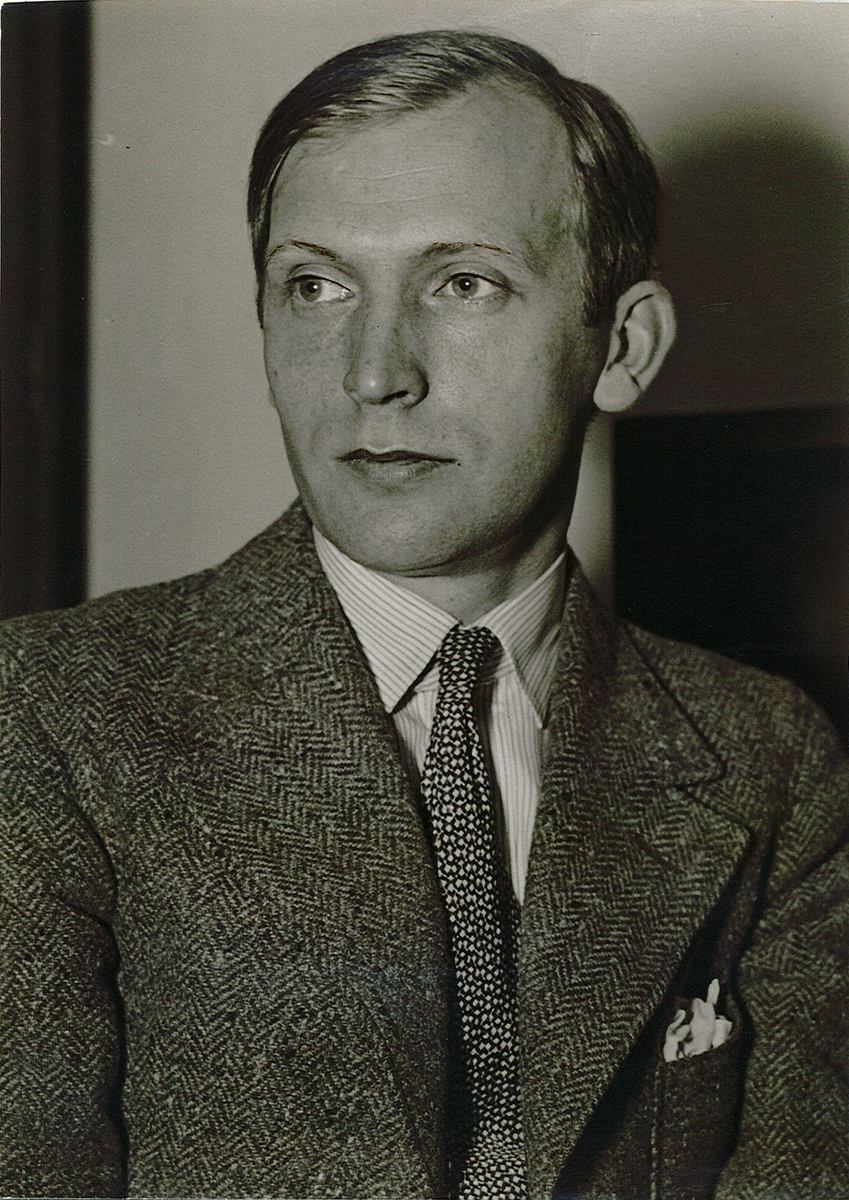
Knut Hergel

Knut Hergel (27 November 1899 – 2 September 1982) was a Norwegian actor and theatre director.

Hergel was actor at Stavanger Theater from 1924 to 1926, and at the theatre in Trondheim from 1926 to 1927. He was employed as stage producer at Det Nye Teater (Oslo) from 1928 to 1935. He was instructor at Det Norske Teatret from 1935, and theatre director from 1936 to 1946, except for the war period. As a refugee in Sweden from 1942 to 1945, he worked as an instructor at the Malmö City Theatre. In 1940, he directed the comedy film Godvakker-Maren.

He was theatre director at the National Theatre from 1946 to 1960, and later instructor at the same theatre.

Cultural offices
Preceded by Axel Otto Normann	Director of the National Theatre; 1946–1960	Succeeded by Carl Fredrik Engelstad
