= Rolv Wesenlund =

Norwegian comedian, singer, clarinetist, writer and actor

Rolv Helge Wesenlund
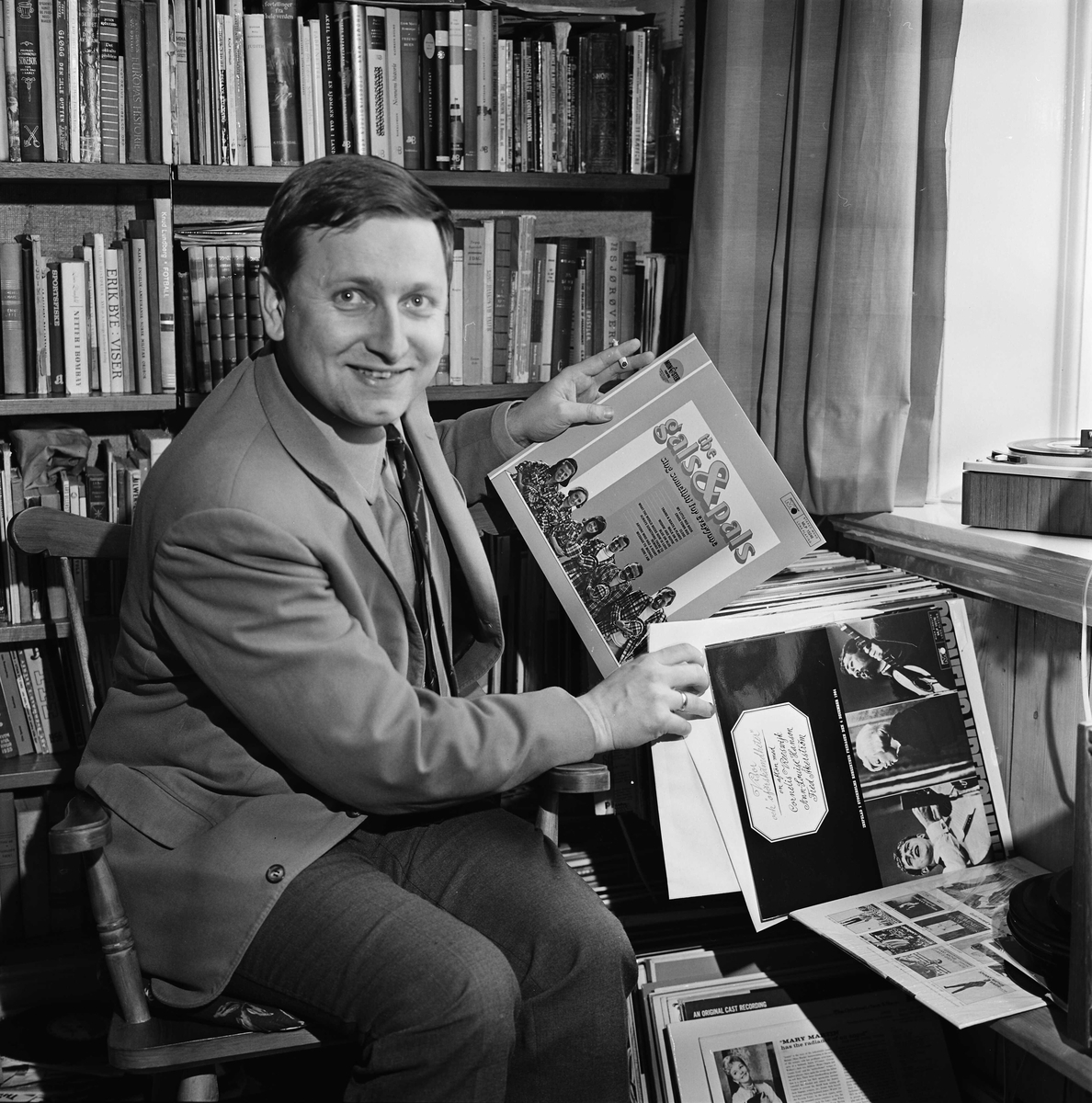
- Rolv Wesenlund in 1967
- Born: 17 September 1936; Horten, Norway
- Died: 18 August 2013 (aged 76); Oslo, Norway

Rolv Helge Wesenlund (17 September 1936 – 18 August 2013) was a Norwegian comedian, singer, clarinetist, writer and actor.

== Biography ==
Wesenlund was most known for having portrayed the title character in the musical Bør Børson jr. and movies Bør Børson jr., Bør Børson II, and the TV series Fleksnes Fataliteter, a popular Scandinavian sitcom, with a huge number of fans in Sweden, Denmark as well as Norway. The show was mainly an adaption of the British series Hancock's Half Hour. Wesenlund had his stage debut in 1964; his movie debut in 1966; and his TV debut in 1968, with the TV series Og takk for det. On this show and several others, he worked with Gunnar Haugan and Harald Heide-Steen Jr. For several years, he hosted the talk show Wesenstund. Wesenlund wrote several books, directed theatrical plays, and was active in several movements to promote senior citizens' causes. Wesenlund was appointed a Knight First Class of the Royal Norwegian Order of St. Olav —and was popular in Denmark and Sweden as well as in his home country.

== Bibliography ==
- 2001 Spis i det gamle Roma: Trastevere (with Per Pallesen and Claus Seidel (illustrations)
- 2000 Dett var dett! : Om og med Rolv Wesenlund (biography cowritten with Øyvind Thorsen)
- 1985 Du verden: fortellinger bakvaskelser stiler og skrivelser 1983–1985
- 1982 Livet er ikke bare en lek, det er også en dans på roser

== Filmography ==
- 2002, 1988, 1982, 1981, 1976, 1974, 1972 Fleksnes Fataliteter
- 1997 Og takk for det - Wesensteen
- 1994 Fredrikssons fabrikk - The Movie, «Nilsen»
- 1992 Ute av drift, «Reidar Willien»
- 1990 Camping
- 1985 Deilig er fjorden, «Terje Svahberg»
- 1982 Henrys bakværelse, «Kunde 1»
- 1982 Olsenbandens aller siste kupp, «Inspektøren»
- 1981 Den grønne heisen, «Fredrik Borkmann»
- 1981 Göta Kanal - eller hvem dro ut proppen? (orig. Göta Kanal - eller vem drog ur proppen?), «Nordmannen Ole»
- 1981 Seks barn på flukt (orig. Barna från Blåsjöfjället), «Norsk sjåfør»
- 1978 Firmaskogturen (orig. Firmaskovturen)
- 1978 Picassos eventyr (orig. Picassos äventyr...tusen kärleksfulla lögner)
- 1976 Bør Børson II, «Bør Børson»
- 1974 Bør Børson jr., «Bør Børson jr.»
- 1974 Den siste Fleksnes, «Marve Fleksnes»
- 1974 Ungen «Gjendøperen»
- 1972 Kjære Husmor
- 1972 Ture Sventon - Privatdetektiv, «Muhammed»
- 1972 Skärgårdsflirt, «Karl-Johan in Swedish TV-play,1972 by Gideon Wahlberg»
- 1972 Norske byggeklosser, multiple roles
- 1970 Douglas, «Douglas»
- 1969 Tipp topp - Husmorfilmen høsten 1969
- 1968 Mannen som ikke kunne le
- 1967 Jungelboka (orig. The Jungle Book)
- 1967 Liv
- 1966 How I Became an Art Collector Without Really Trying
- 1966 Hurra for Andersens!, «Hermansen»

Awards
Preceded by Petter Nome	Se og Hør's TV Personality of the Year; 1994	Succeeded by Hilde Hummelvoll
