= An-Magritt =

1969 film

- Directed by: Arne Skouen
- Written by: Johan Falkberget; Arne Skouen
- Starring: Liv Ullmann; Per Oscarsson; Wolf von Gersum; Claes Gill; Georg Løkkeberg; Lars Tvinde
- Release date: 6 February 1969
- Running time: 100 minutes
- Country: Norway
- Language: Norwegian

An-Magritt is a 1969 Norwegian drama film directed by Arne Skouen, starring Liv Ullmann. The film is based on two novels by Johan Falkberget: Plogjernet and An-Magritt.

An-Magritt (Ullmann) grows up in a Norwegian mining town. She is born as a result of her mother being raped. Her mother later kills herself after being put in the stocks for an extramarital affair with a soldier. An-Magritt is then raised by her grandfather, and has to work with the men to get by.
