= Egil Monn-Iversen =

Norwegian composer, conductor and producer

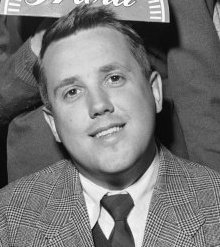

Background information
- Born: Egil Ragnar Monn-Iversen; 14 April 1928
- Origin: Oslo, Norway
- Died: 7 July 2017 (aged 89)
- Genres: Pop, Musical, Film score
- Occupations: Pianist, Composer, Conductor, Producer
- Instrument: Piano
- Years active: 1940s–2003
- Labels: Triola, Nor-Disc, Karussell, Forum

Egil Ragnar Monn-Iversen (14 April 1928 – 7 July 2017) was a Norwegian musician, one of the most influential modern composers in Norway. He has had many important roles in Norwegian music, film, opera, television, comedy and theater. For some time he had so much influence in Norwegian culture that he got the nickname The Godfather, even though he always considered himself a down-to-earth musician.

Monn-Iversen owned a film production company, a record label, and an agency for musical artists, he was the founder of the vocal group The Monn Keys, he was the CEO at the Chat Noir theatre, chairman at The Norwegian Opera and from the 1960s until his death in 2017 worked in NRK (Norwegian Broadcasting Corporation) and Det norske teatret (The Norwegian Theatre). He composed scores to over 100 Norwegian movies and TV series.

Monn-Iversen was married to the Norwegian actor and singer Sølvi Wang until her death in 2011.

== Ownership and positions ==
Egil Monn-Iversen established and owned the Norwegian movie studio EMI Produksjon AS. The studio produced more than 20 Norwegian feature movies.

Monn-Iversen founded the vocal group, The Monn Keys, and in cooperation with the group's members he established the company Egil Monn-Iversen A/S. This company focused mainly on being a music record company, publishing records on several different labels. In 1957 the company reached 23% market share in the Norwegian music industry. In addition "Egil Monn-Iversen A/S" had activity in business areas such as music publishing, running jukeboxes around the country - and as a producer of concerts, movies and stage productions.

In 1983, Monn-Iversen founded Thalia Teater A/S, a company producing musicals, revues and farces in Scandinavia.

Selection of Monn-Iversen's other positions in Scandinavian culture and entertainment:

- Conductor at the Chat Noir Theater, Oslo (1954–1963)
- CEO at the Chat Noir Theater, Oslo (1959–1963)
- Chairman at The Norwegian National Opera and Ballet, Oslo (1981–1996)
- CEO at Chinateatern, Stockholm (1997)
- Chairman for Norsk Konsertdireksjon
- Member of Arbeiderpartiets Kulturutvalg (Labor Party's Cultural Committee)
- Member of Norsk Kulturråds musikkutvalg (Norwegian Art Council's Musical Committee)
- Head of Music at Norwegian Broadcasting Corporation (from the 1960s)
- Head of Music at Det Norske Teatret (The Norwegian Theater) (from the 1960s)

== Awards ==
- 2002 Axel Waldemars Minnepris (Award in Memory of Axel Waldemar)
- 1999 The Jury's Award of Honor from Edvard-prisen
- 1998 Æres-Amanda (Honorary award from The Norwegian Movie Award)
- 1998 Knight of First Class of Order of St. Olav
- 1990 Gammleng-prisen in the category veteran
- 1973 The Jury's Honorary Award at Spellemannprisen 1972 for the musical Bør Børson Jr.
- 1972 Hulda Garborgs minnepris
- 1967 Aamodtstauetten
- 1961 Norsk filmkritikerlags (Norwegian movie critic association) award for the music to the feature film "Line"

Preceded by (Sweden) Curt-Eric Holmquist	Eurovision Song Contest conductor 1986	Succeeded by (Belgium) Jo Carlier
