= Harald Tusberg =

Norwegian television personality (1935–2023)

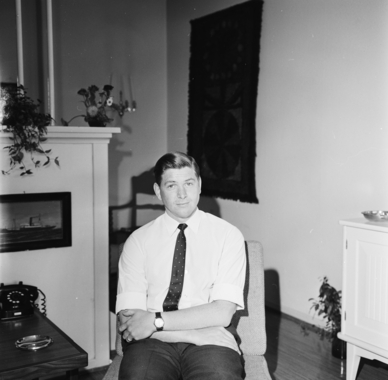
- Tusberg in 1967

Background information
- Born: 6 April 1935; Bergen, Norway
- Died: 3 October 2023 (aged 88)
- Occupations: Television personality, screenwriter, songwriter, author

Harald Tusberg (6 April 1935 – 3 October 2023) was a Norwegian television personality, screenwriter, songwriter and author.

== Biography ==
Harald Tusberg was born in Bergen on 6 April 1935. His parents were Kristoffer Lund Jensen Tusberg and Sigrid Marie Junge. He was married to Ulla Holm.

Tusberg was host of many Norwegian Broadcasting Corporation programs, including the Norwegian version of This Is Your Life (Dette er ditt liv), and the Eurovision Song Contest. Tusberg was also a screenwriter, songwriter, and author.

In 1996, he suffered a stroke which forced him to retire.

Tusberg died on 3 October 2023, at the age of 88.
