= Britt Langlie =

Norwegian stage actress (born 1945)

- Born: 14 January 1945

Britt Langlie (born 14 January 1945) is a Norwegian stage, film and television actress.

== Information ==
Born in Trondheim, she made her debut at Trøndelag Teater in 1966. From 1967 she has worked at Det Norske Teatret. In 1981 she was awarded the Norwegian Theatre Critics' Prize for her role as Edith Piaf in Piaf. She has also appeared on the screen, mostly in televised plays.
