= Johan Falkberget =

Norwegian politician and writer

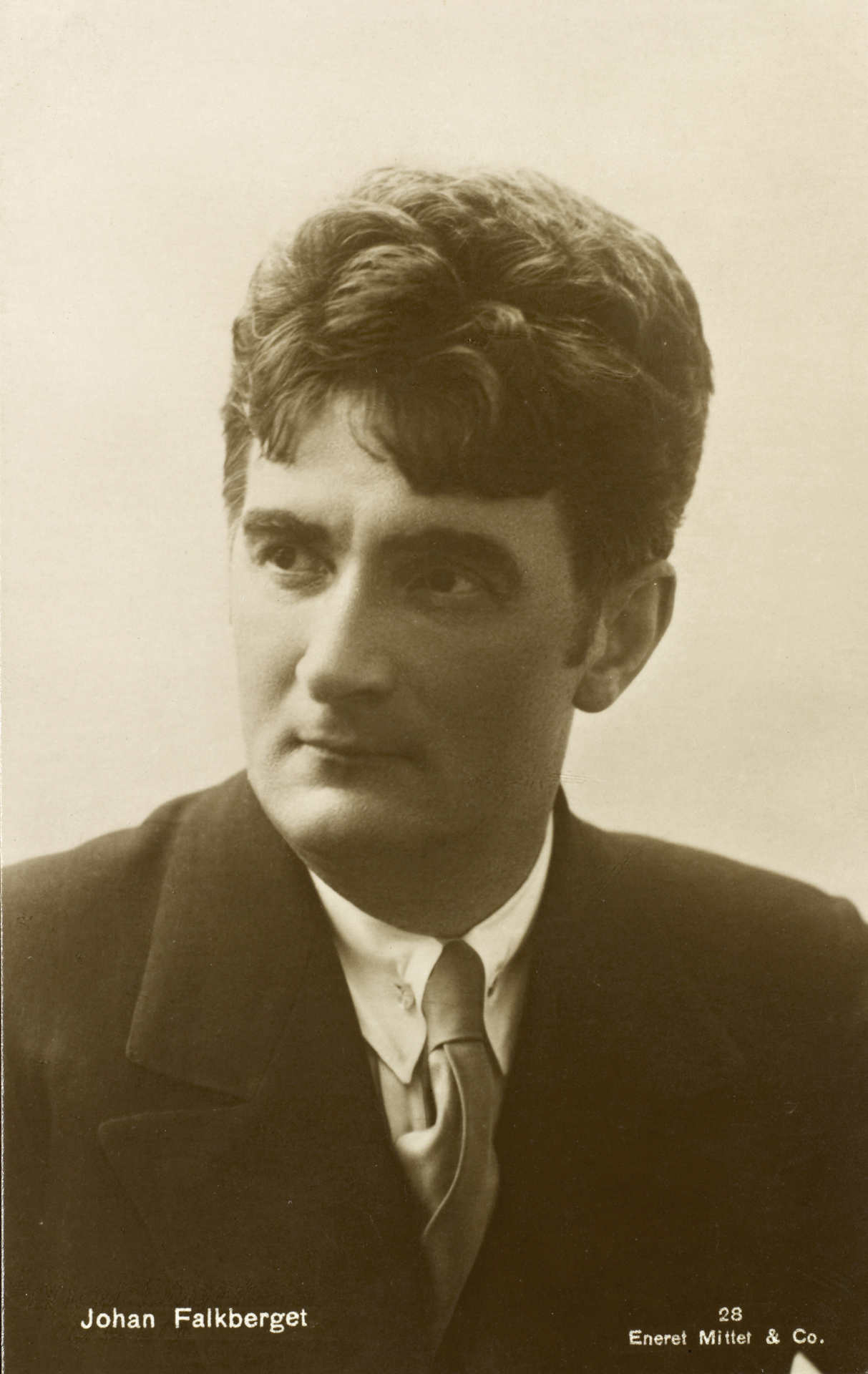

Member of the Norwegian Parliament for Sør-Trøndelag
- In office 1931–1933

Johan Falkberget, born Johan Petter Lillebakken, (30 September 1879 – 5 April 1967) was a Norwegian author. He was nominated for the --Nobel Prize in Literature.

== Life and career ==
Johan Falkberget was born on the Lillebakken farm in the Rugldal valley of Røros Municipality, Norway. The area was known for its copper mines.

In 1891, he began to write his Christianus Sextus trilogy, though it was not published until later. He formally changed his surname for writing purposes in 1893, from Lillebakken to Falkberget—the name of the farm he then lived on (this was a normal practice in those days). His first work was published in 1902. In 1906 he quit his job as a miner and found a job as editor of the newspaper Nybrott in Ålesund. In 1908 he traveled to Fredrikstad and edited Smaalenenes Socialdemokrat. He then received a government-sponsored scholarship and traveled to Kirkenes. From 1909 to 1922 his primary residence and workplace was in Kristiania (now Oslo).

In 1922 he returned to Røros and lived on the Ratvolden farm, less than 1 km from the Falkberget farm. His Ratvolden house is now a museum. While living there, he represented the Norwegian Labour Party (Arbeiderpartiet) for Sør-Trøndelag in the Storting from 1931 to 1933.

Since he grew up in a mining area and began his career as a miner, his works drew extensively on his experiences with the people, the country culture and mining. His breakthrough work in 1923 was a novel titled Den fjerde nattevakt (transl. The Fourth Night Watch), a historical novel set in the first half of the 19th century in and around the mines. This was followed by his «Christianus Sextus» trilogy, set in the 1720s, in which the mining culture is also a central theme. Falkberget contributed extensively to the newspaper Fjell-Ljom.

He died on 5 April 1967 and is buried in the family plot in the upper churchyard at Røros.

=== Authorship ===
"The miners' toil and rhythm of life became the fulcrum of Falkberget's literature", according to biographer Sturle Kojen.

== Important works ==
Many of his works are not available in English translation. Those that are, have been noted with the English equivalent title next to the Norwegian title.

- 1902 Når livskvelden kjem - Forteljing
- 1903 Bjarne - Et billede fra en fjellbygd
- 1905 Vaarsus - Fortælling
- 1905 Moseflyer - Skitser og sagn fra Dovrefjeld
- 1906 Hauk Uglevatn - Fortælling fra Dovrefjeld
- 1907 Svarte Fjelde - Fortælling
- 1908 Mineskud
- 1908 Ved den evige sne - Fortælling I
- 1909 Fakkelbrand
- 1909 Urtidsnat
- 1910 Vargfjeldet - Smaa fortællinger
- 1910 Nord i haugene - Eventyr
- 1911 Fimbulvinter
- 1912 En finnejentes kjærlighetshistorie
- 1912 Jutul-historier - Fortalt av 'n Soplim-Tosten sjøl
- 1913 Eli Sjursdotter
- 1913 Eventyr. Nord i Haugene og Jutulhistorier
- 1914 Simen Mustrøen. Karikaturkomedie
- 1914 Av Jarleæt
- 1915 Lisbet paa Jarnfjeld
- 1916 Eventyrfjeld. Historier for barn
- 1916 Helleristninger. Historier fra fjeldet og jagten
- 1917 Brændoffer
- 1918 Rott jer sammen
- 1918 Sol. En historie fra 1600 tallet
- 1919 Barkebrødstider - Nye fortællinger
- 1919 Vidden - Fortællinger
- 1919 Bjørneskytteren
- 1920 Bør Børson - Olderdalens største sønn
- 1920 Byd lykken haanden eller da Johannes Mo løste rebusen
- 1920 Bør Børson jr.
- 1921 Naglerne. Eller jernet fra Norden og andre fortellinger
- 1923 Den fjerde nattevakt (The Fourth Night Watch)
- 1924 I Nordenvindens land
- 1925 Vers fra Rugelsjøen
- 1926 Anders Reitan. Liv og virke 1826-1926
- 1927 Den nye Bør Børson jr.
- 1927 Christianus Sextus. De første geseller (CHRISTIANUS SEXTUS - trilogy: The First Journeyman)
- 1928 Det høie fjeld
- 1928 Solfrid i Bjørnstu og de syv svende
- 1929 I forbifarten
- 1931 Christianus Sextus. I hammerens tegn (CHRISTIANUS SEXTUS - trilogy: The Sign of the Hammer)
- 1933 Der stenene taler
- 1935 Christianus Sextus. Tårnvekteren(CHRISTIANUS SEXTUS - trilogy: The Tower Watch)
- 1936 I vakttårnet
- 1940 Nattens Brød. An-Magritt
- 1944 Runer på fjellveggen. Sagn og fortellinger
- 1946 Nattens Brød. Plogjernet (The Plough)
- 1948 I lyset fra min bergmannslampe
- 1952 Nattens Brød. Johannes
- 1959 Nattens Brød. Kjærlighets veier (Love's Way)
- 1963 Jeg så dem --
- 1964 Vers fra Rugelsjøen og andre dikt

== Awards ==
- Gyldendal's Endowment for 1939
- Nominated for the Nobel Prize thirty-six times.
