= Flagstad =

Flagstad is a Norwegian surname. Notable people with the surname include:

- Karen-Marie Flagstad (1904–1992), Norwegian opera singer, daughter of Maja and Michael, sister of Kirsten
- Kirsten Flagstad (1895–1962), Norwegian opera singer
- Maja Flagstad (1871–1958), Norwegian pianist
- Michael Flagstad (1869–1930), Norwegian musician and conductor
- Mikkel Flagstad (1930–2005), Norwegian jazz musician, grandson of Maja and Michael

== See also ==
- Fløgstad
