= Conrad Arnesen =

Norwegian actor and opera singer

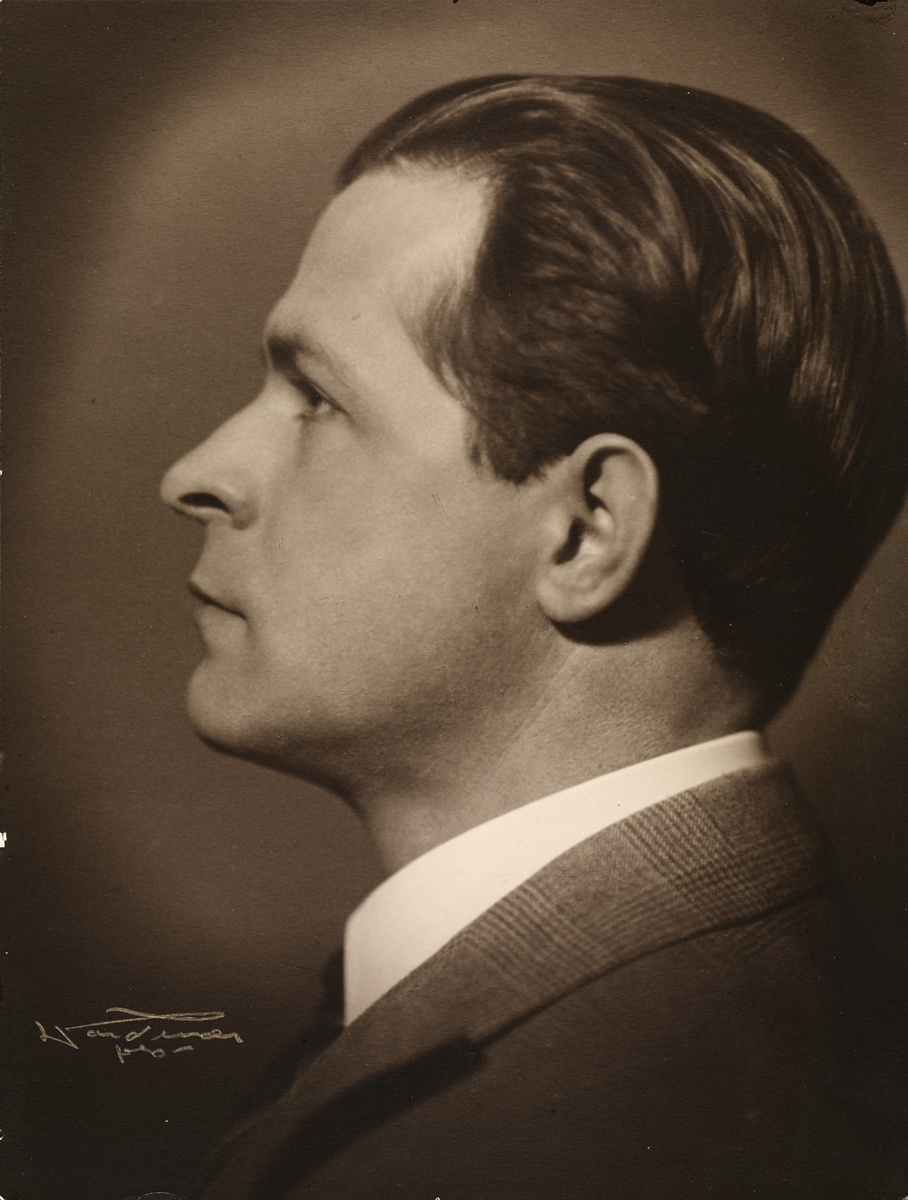
- Born: May 5, 1891; Kristiania, Norway
- Died: May 25, 1955 (aged 64)
- Occupation(s): Actor, opera singer

Conrad Arnesen (May 5, 1891 – May 25, 1955) was a Norwegian actor and opera singer.

Arnesen was born in Kristiania (now Oslo). He made his film debut in 1922 in Erling Eriksen's Kjærlighet paa pinde, in which he played one of the film's three main roles together with August Schønemann and Ellen Sinding. In 1938, Arnesen had a minor role in Toralf Sandø and Knut Hergel's film Bør Børson Jr. He was also active with the Oslo New Theater in the 1920s and 1930s, and with Oslo's Opera Comique, where he worked under Benno Singer.

== Filmography ==
- 1922: Kjærlighet paa pinde
- 1938: Bør Børson Jr.
