= Mikkel Flagstad =

Norwegian jazz saxophonist

- Born: Michael Flagstad; 23 April 1930; Oslo
- Origin: Norway
- Died: 29 June 2005 (aged 75) Oslo
- Genres: Jazz
- Occupations: Musician, composer
- Instrument: Tenor saxophone
- Formerly of: Simon Brehm's Orchestra

Michael "Mikkel" Flagstad (23 April 1930 – 29 June 2005) was a Norwegian jazz musician (saxophone), son of the cellist Ole Flagstad and nephew of the pianist Lasse Flagstad, the singer Karen-Marie Flagstad and opera singer Kirsten Flagstad. His paternal grandparents were the violinist Michael Flagstad and the pianist, organist, and accompanist Maja Flagstad. He was known for his cool jazz–inspired style and as a musician that frequented the Hotel Viking in Oslo.

== Career ==
Flagstad was raised in a musical family surrounded by future jazz talents like Einar Schanke and Bonsak Schieldrop at Ris, Oslo, and became a professional musician as a young man (1947). He led his own Be Bop Band (1949–50), and joined the orchestras of Tage Wilford and Hans Backe (1945). There after he toured with Per Asplin (1948), Karl Otto Hoff, and contributed in Egil Monn-Iversen's orchestra (1951), before joining the lineup of the Swede Rolf Ericson (1952–54). In the lineup of Simon Brehm's Orchestra together with Lars Gullin and Bengt Hallberg (1952–53).

He suffered from tuberculosis in 1954, and after convalescence in the country he slowed his music ministry. His film music for the Line was awarded with Buddyprisen in 1960, and he led his own Mikkel Flagstad Quintet including Atle Hammer (trumpet), Kjell Karlsen (piano), Erik Amundsen (bass) and Ole Jacob Hansen (drums), while he took dentist education. Flagstad was suffering from fear of flying and therefore avoided the so-called Bent Sølve Accident, the plane crash 1 May 1969 where the rest of the pop-jazz-orchestra of Bent Sølves were killed. The disease shortened his career in the early 1970s, then he suffered a stroke in 1990 and died of pneumonia in 2005.

== Honors ==
- 1960: Buddyprisen

== Discography ==
- 1988: Oslo Jazz Circle Presents: Arvid Gram Paulsen, Mikkel Flagstad, Kristian Bergheim (Gemini Music)
- 2001: Portrait of a Norwegian Jazz Artist: Kjell Karlsen (Gemini Music)

Awards
| Preceded by Einar Iversen | Recipient of the Buddyprisen; 1960 | Succeeded by Erik Amundsen |
