= Kirsten Flagstad Museum =

Museum in Hamar, Norway

Coordinates: 60.7961°N 11.0686°E

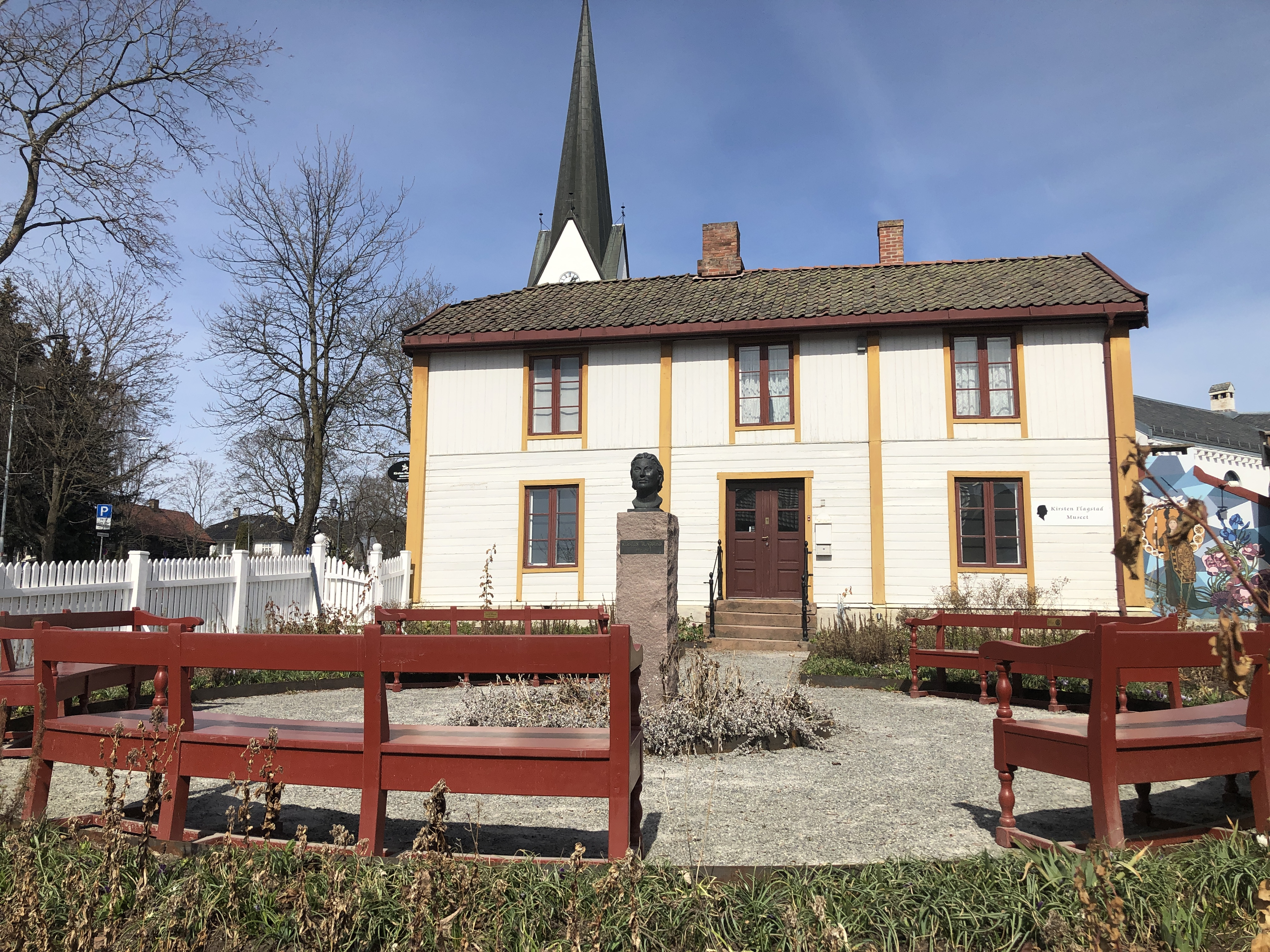
Kirsten Flagstad Museum in Hamar, Norway

Kirsten Flagstad Museum is dedicated to the life and career of the Norwegian operatic soprano Kirsten Flagstad (1895–1962).

The museum is in a wooden house called Strandstuen, located at Kirkebakken 11, Hamar, Norway, close to the ruins of Hamar Cathedral.

== History of the house ==
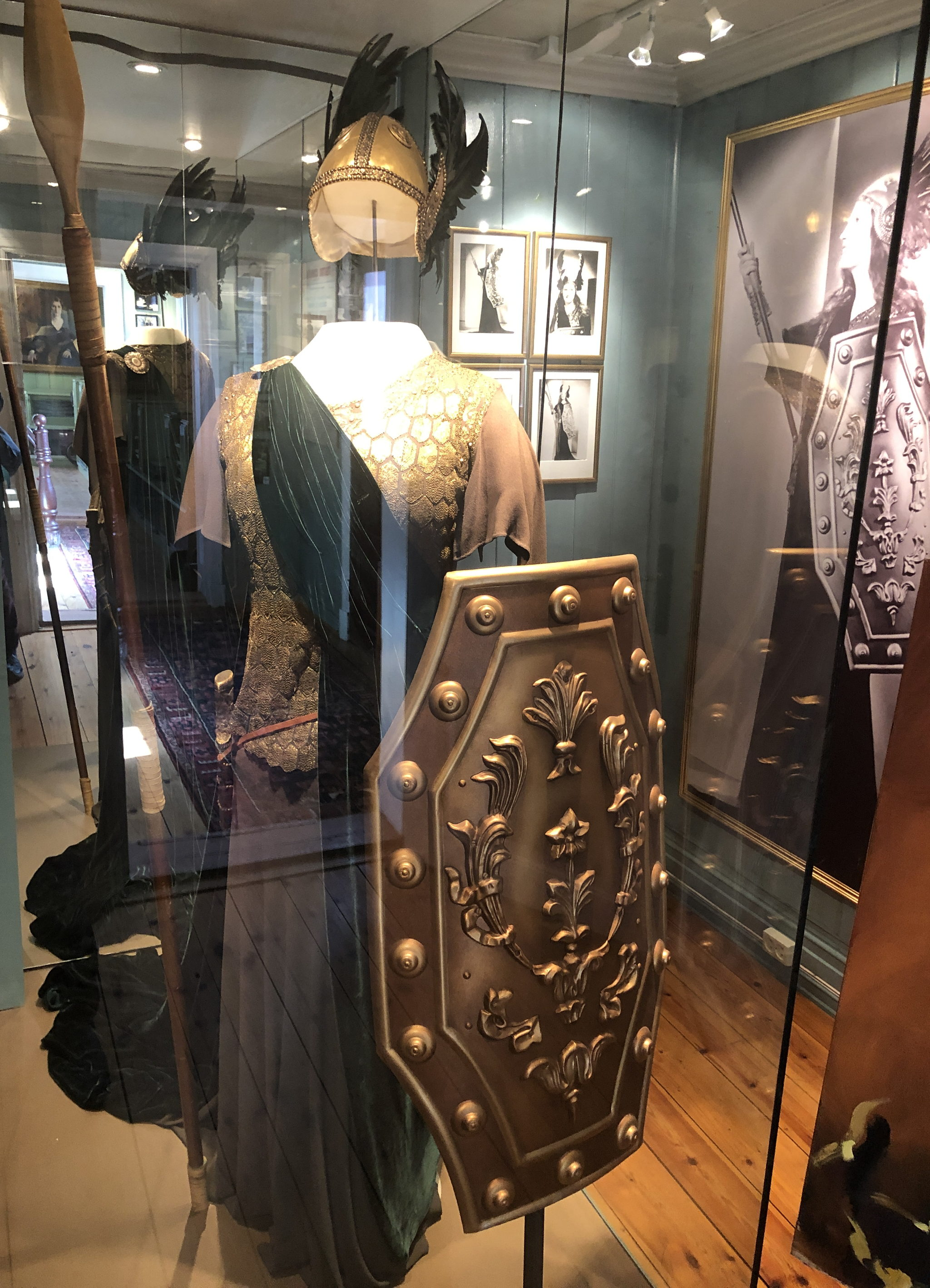
Flagstad’s costume for Hollywood's The Big Broadcast of 1938, when she was filmed singing Brünnhilde's Battle Cry from Wagner's Die Walküre. (Collection of the Kirsten Flagstad Museum)

This history of the house dates back to at least 1840, when Kirsten Flagstad's great-grandfather settled there. Flagstad was born in the house on 12 July 1895, when her grandparents owned the house. At that time Flagstad's father Michael Flagstad and her mother Maja were already living in Oslo, where they eventually bought a house in Vinderen in 1902.

Flagstad didn't grow up in Hamar, but she remained proud of her roots and referred to Hamar as "my town": "Jeg sier alltid at jeg er fra Hamar – jeg er så stolt av det, jeg føler fremdeles slik at Hamar er min by!" [I always say I'm from Hamar – I'm so proud of it, I still feel like Hamar is my town!]

== Museum ==
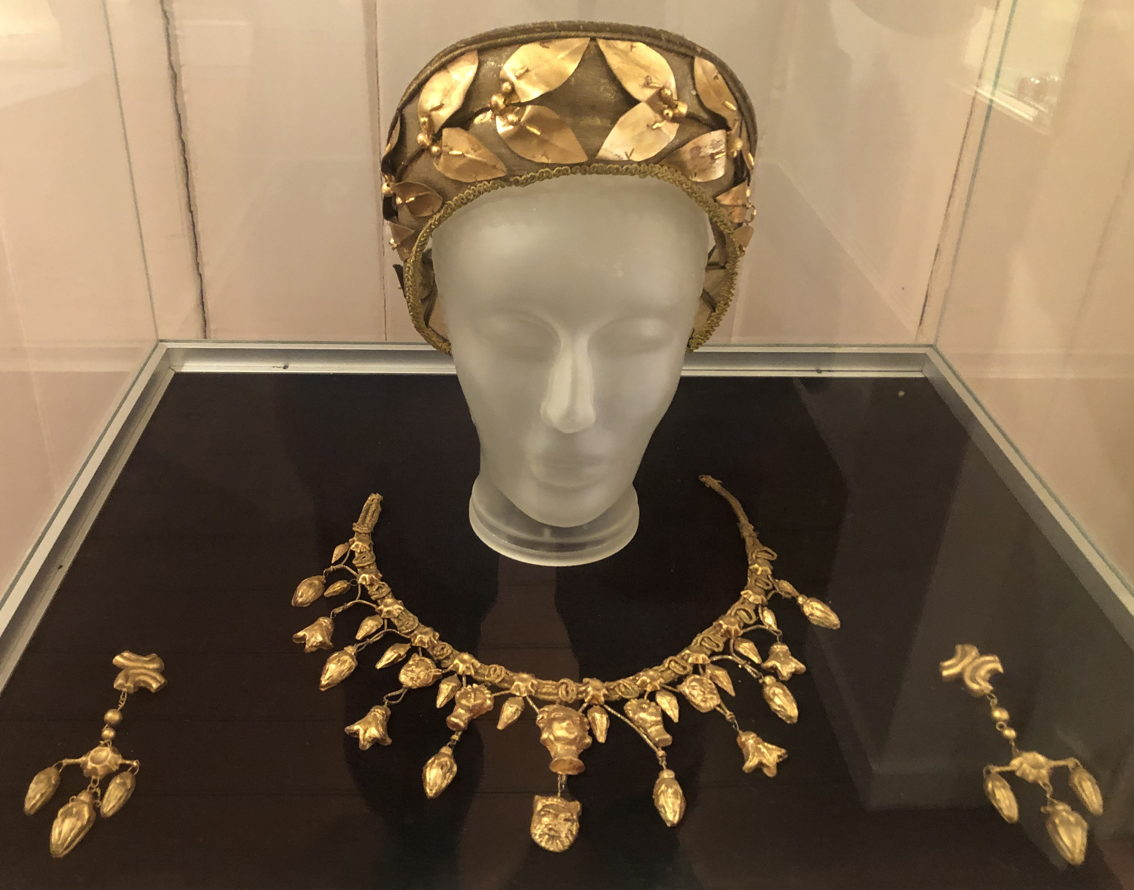
Costume jewellery worn by Kirsten Flagstad as Queen Dido in Purcell’s Dido and Aeneas in the early 1950s. (Collection of the Kirsten Flagstad Museum)

The museum's collections consist of costumes, props, pictures and objects from the singer's life on and off the opera stage, photographs and programs from a number of productions, recordings of performances and recordings on record and CD.

The old workshop of a blacksmith, next to the museum is now the office, together with a small concert hall and the archives.

The house is open to visitors during the summer season, but can also be visited by appointment the rest of the year, and is used as a resource center for students, teachers and researchers.

The museum is a part of the Anno Museum organisation, a collection of a series of museums in Hedmark.

== Gallery ==
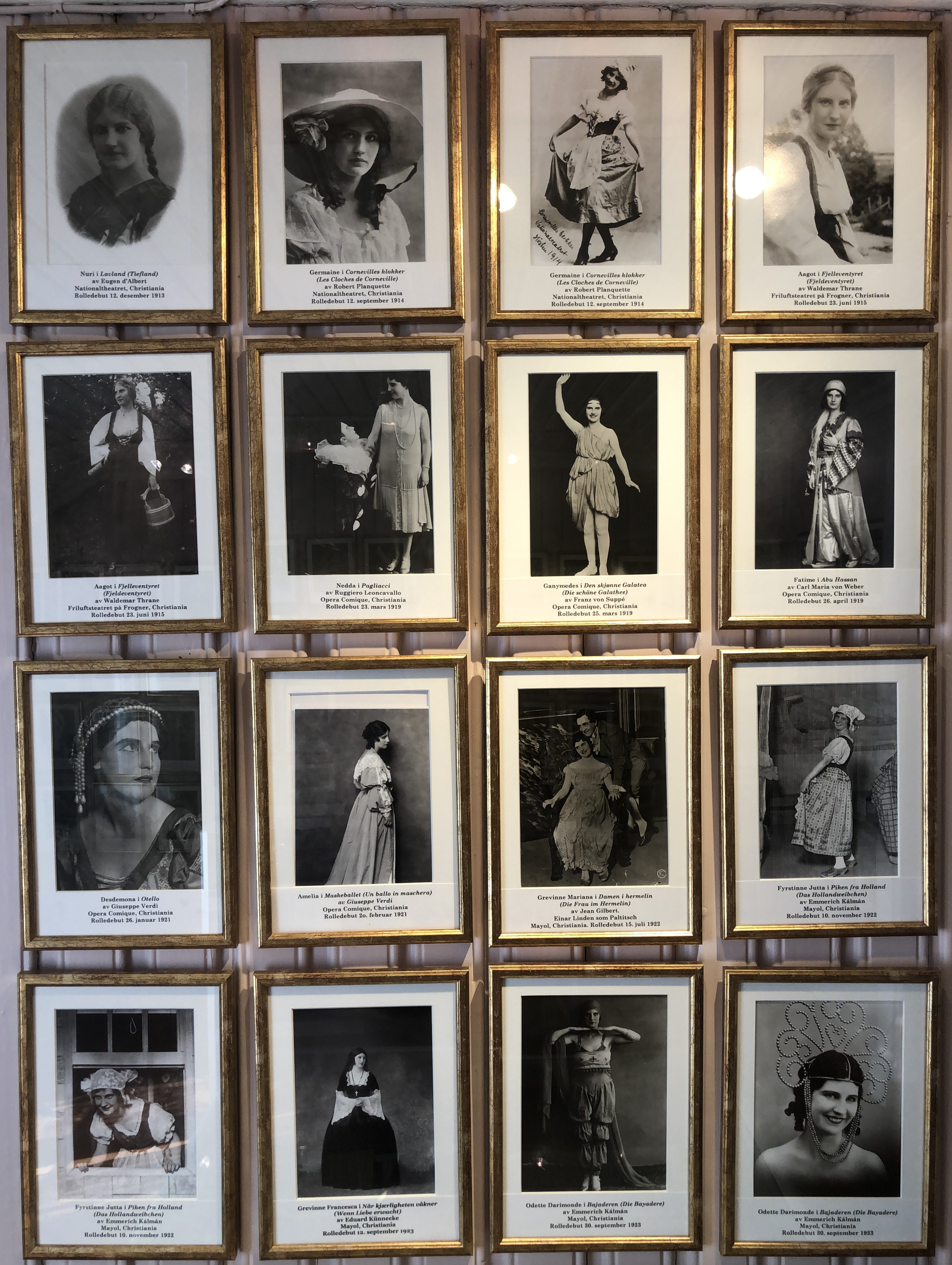
1

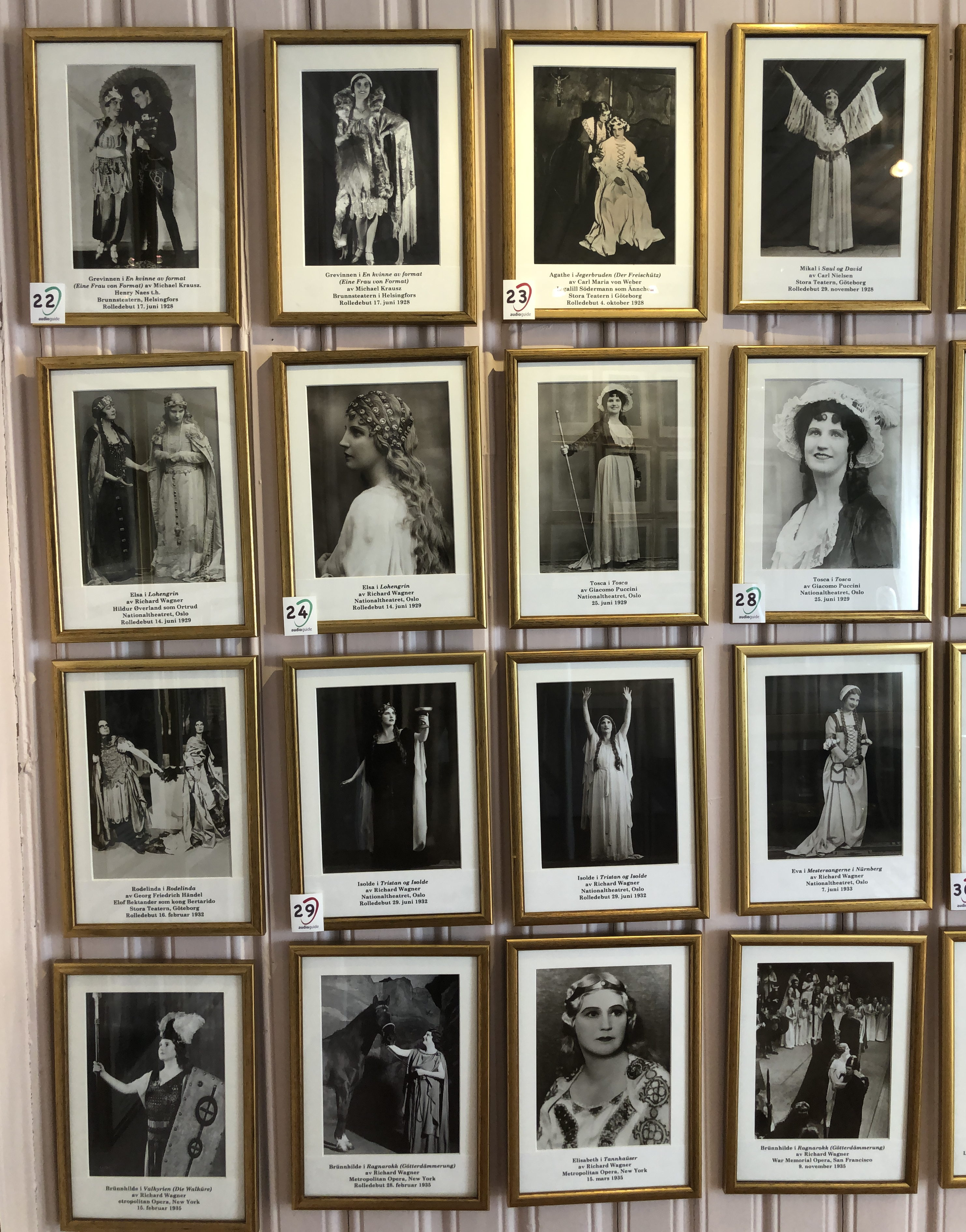
2

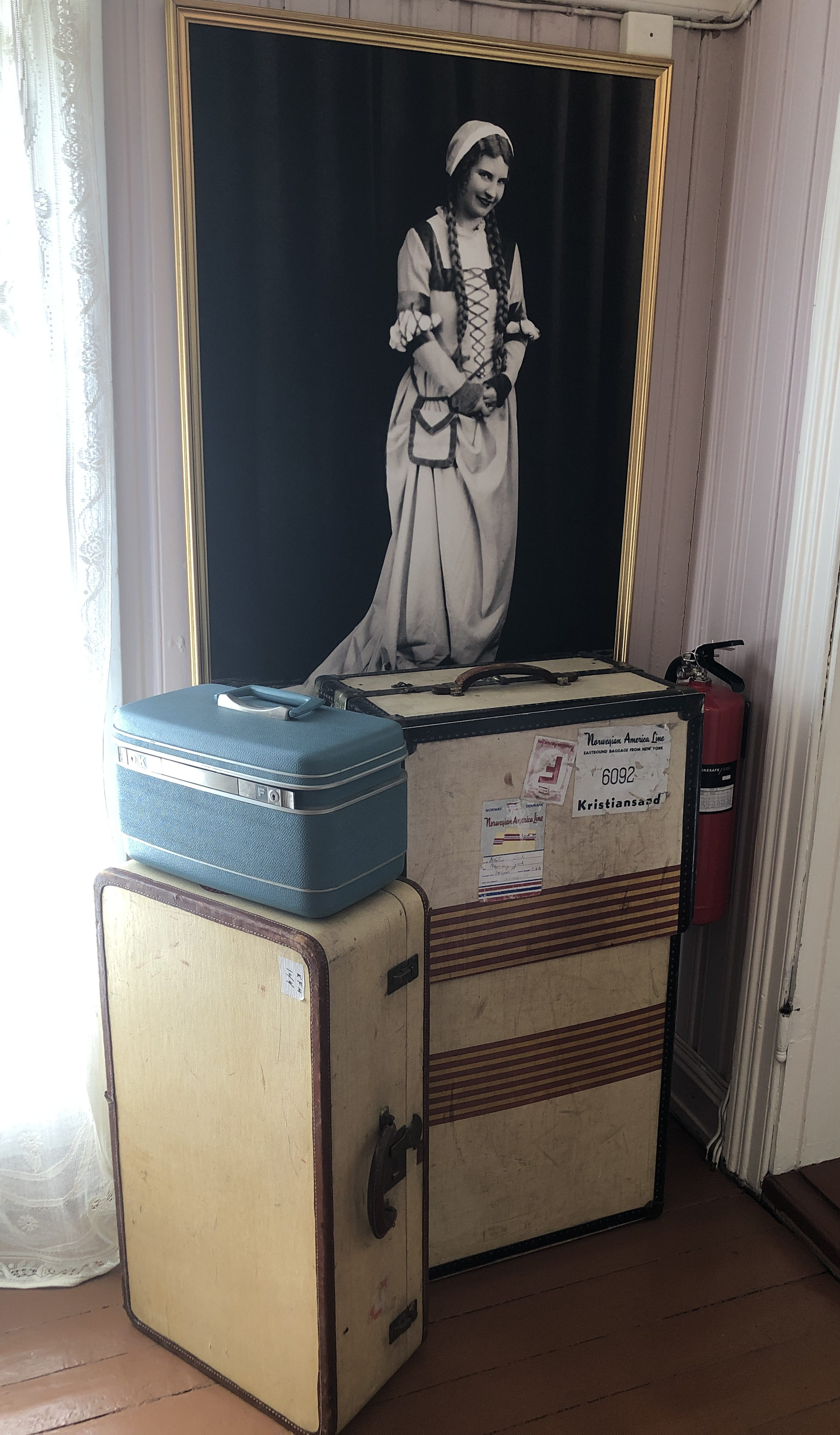
3
