= Opera comique =

Opera comique may also refer to:

- Opéra comique, a genre of French opera
- Opéra-Comique, a Parisian opera company
- Opera Comique, theatre in London
- Opera Comique (Oslo), a Norwegian opera company

== See also ==
- Comic opera
