= Theatre Moderne =

Theatre in Norway

Coordinates: 59°54′47″N 10°44′00″E

Theatre Moderne was a music-hall theatre in Kristiania, Norway. It was established by Benno Singer in 1914, and closed in 1925. The stage was located in Tivolihaven. Among the actors were August Schønemann, who had his breakthrough at this theatre, and Signe Heide Steen.
