= Erling Krogh =

Norwegian operatic tenor

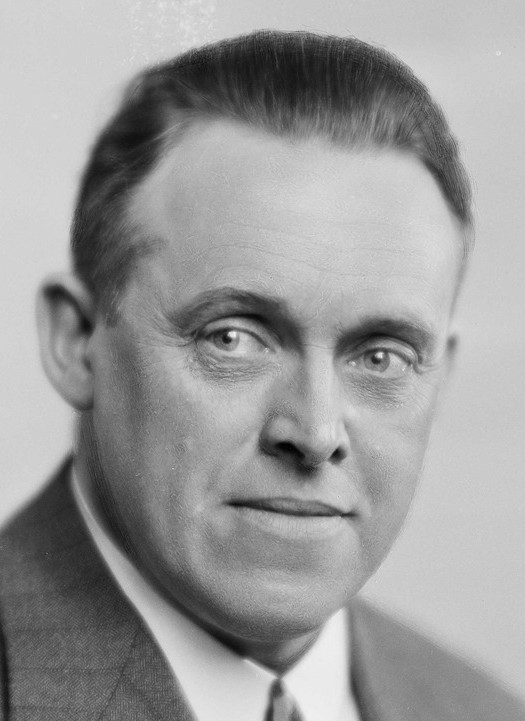
Erling Krogh in 1930.

Erling Krogh (September 12, 1888 – October 28, 1968) was a Norwegian operatic tenor.

== Biography ==
Krogh was born in Kristiania (now Oslo). He attended the Oslo Cathedral School until 1905, and then studied at the Royal Academy of Arts and Crafts from 1905 to 1909. During that time, from 1905 and until 1915, he worked as a goldsmith. While he was studying, he sang with Ellen Schytte-Jacobsen. In 1915 he traveled to Copenhagen and Paris to study under Peter Cornelius. Later he also studied with Jean de Reszke in Nice in 1921.

He has his debut as a tenor in 1915, and starting in 1918 he was engaged with the Opera Comique for three years. He then headed the Norwegian Opera Society from 1922 to 1923, after which he established his own opera society, which he headed for a year. Following this, he traveled extensively, performing as a soloist at the Nordic Music Festival in Helsinki in 1932, in Oslo in 1936, and in Copenhagen in 1938. After 1936 he also worked as a voice instructor in Oslo. He also toured in the United States.

From the first recording that he produced in 1916, his career as a recording artist lasted for 40 years. He had a versatile repertoire that included classical music, working songs, and Christmas songs. At the end of his career he also held numerous church concerts.

He died in Oslo.

== Roles ==
In the course of his career, Krogh performed in over 30 operas and operettas. His favorite composer was Richard Wagner, but he also sang in operas by other composers. He was a guest performer at the Berlin State Opera, the Royal Danish Theater in Copenhagen, and the Royal Swedish Opera in Stockholm. His most important roles included the following:

- Eleazar in Fromental Halévy's The Jewess
- Canio in Ruggero Leoncavallo's Pagliacci
- Samson in Camille Saint-Saëns's Samson and Delilah
- Title role in Richard Wagner's Lohengrin
- Title role in Richard Wagner's Tannhäuser
- Title role in Giuseppe Verdi's Othello
- Don José in Georges Bizet's Carmen

His concert tours took him to Norway, Sweden, Denmark, Iceland, Germany, France, Spain, and the United States. He also played a role in the Norwegian silent film Madame besøker Oslo (Madame Visits Oslo, 1927) and often sang for screenings of silent films in Oslo.

== Awards and legacy ==
In 1960, Krogh received the King's Medal of Merit in gold. He became an honorary member of the Oslo Craftsmen's Singing Society in 1957, and in 1963 he was awarded a permanent national grant for deserving artists. The Erling Krogh Singers Grant is named after him and is awarded by the Norwegian National Opera and Ballet.
