= Karen-Marie Flagstad =

Norwegian operatic soprano (1904–1992)

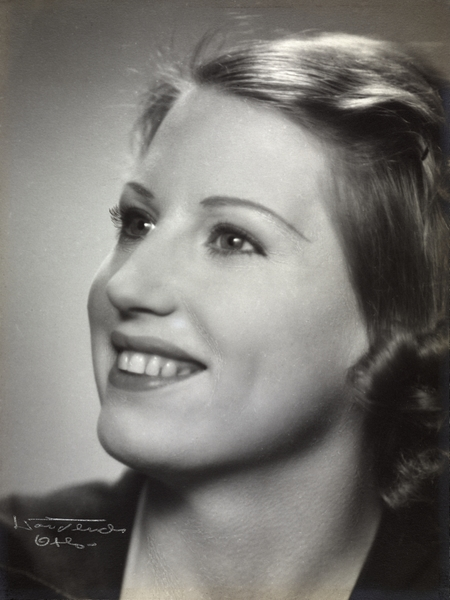
- Flagstad, c. 1935
- Born: Karen-Marie Flagstad; 24 November 1904; Oslo, Norway
- Died: 25 December 1992 (aged 88); Oslo, Norway
- Occupation: Opera singer
- Parent(s): Michael Flagstad; Maja Flagstad
- Relatives: Kirsten Flagstad (sister)

Karen-Marie Flagstad (November 24, 1904 – December 25, 1992) was a Norwegian soprano opera singer and one of Norway's leading singers in her time. Born in Oslo, she was the sister of the world-renowned singer Kirsten Flagstad, and the daughter of the conductor Michael Flagstad and the pianist Maja Flagstad.

Flagstad played minor roles as part of her family's engagement with the short-lived Opera Comique (1918–1921), and had her serious stage debut (1926) as Hannah in Eduard Künneke's The Cousin from Nowhere. Another of her early roles was in Emmerich Kálmán's Die Bajadere. Her first major roles were as Amor in Christoph Willibald Gluck's Orfeo ed Euridice (Central Theater, 1933) and Giuiletta in Jacques Offenbach's The Tales of Hoffmann (National Theatre, 1938) under the direction of Olav Kielland.

Flagstad traveled abroad and sang on American radio. On the German stage, she played Salome in Richard Strauss's opera of the same name, and Ariadne in his Ariadne auf Naxos. She was married to the Austrian pianist Johann Crkal (1891–1939) (Note: The Oslo Graveyards and Burials Agency incorrectly lists Johann Crkal's birth year as 1882.) and she performed in Italy and France as Karen Maria Crkal, first as a guest together with her sister as Brünnhilde at La Scala as Ortlinde in Wagner's Die Walküre (1949). She repeated the role in Rome (1952) and then in Bordeaux together with Beate Asserson (1954). She performed again at La Scala in 1953 as Wellgunde in Götterdämmerung.

Flagstad also appeared in other operas (including Carl Maria von Weber's Der Freischütz, Beethoven's Fidelio, and Eugen d'Albert's Tiefland for NRK), appeared on radio with her brother Lasse Flagstad on piano (1946), was a director in the Norwegian Opera Association (Norsk Operaforbund), and worked with the People's Theater in Oslo.

Flagstad was employed at the Norwegian National Opera and Ballet (led by her sister) from 1958 to 1961, where she was acclaimed in the role of Ågot in Waldemar Thrane's Fjeldeventyret (The Mountain Tale, 1960) and later worked as a répétiteur (like her mother). She died in Oslo in 1992, at the age of 88.

== Releases ==
- Richard Wagner's Die Walküre (1950). Live from La Scala. Directed by Wilhelm Furtwängler.
- Richard Wagner's Die Walküre (1955). From the Paris Opera.
- Richard Wagner's Götterdämmerung (Decca, 1956). With Norwegian artists and director Øivin Fjeldstad.
