= Fløgstad =

Fløgstad is a Norwegian surname. Notable people with the surname include:

- Kjartan Fløgstad (born 1944), Norwegian author
- Kristen Fløgstad (born 1947), Norwegian athlete

== See also ==
- Flagstad
