= Kurt Adler =

Austrian opera conductor (1907–1977)

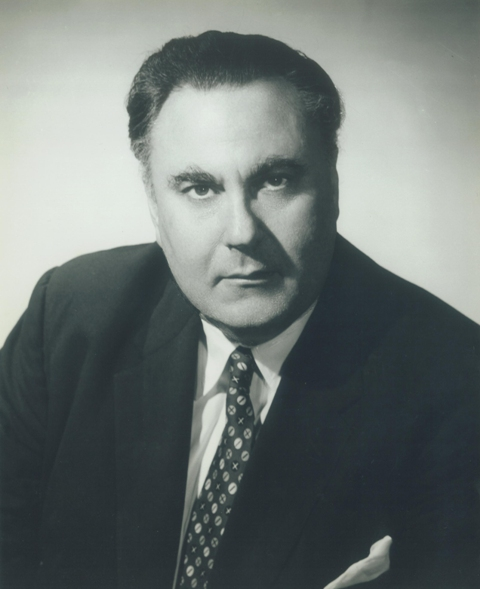
- Born: March 1, 1907; Jindřichův Hradec, Austria-Hungary
- Died: September 21, 1977 (aged 70); Butler, New Jersey, United States
- Citizenship: Austrian American
- Education: University of Vienna (MA)
- Occupations: Conductor, pianist, chorus master
- Known for: Conductor and chorus master, New York Metropolitan Opera, 1943–1973

Kurt Adler (March 1, 1907 – September 21, 1977) was an Austrian and American conductor, chorusmaster, author and pianist. He was best known as the chorus master and lead conductor of the Metropolitan Opera in New York City from 1943 to 1973. He conducted orchestras in Europe, North America, Canada and Mexico.

== Early life ==
Kurt Adler was born in Jindřichův Hradec, Bohemia, Austria-Hungary (now the Czech Republic) to a bourgeois Jewish family. He was the only child of Siegfried Adler (born 1876), a textile factory owner, and Olga (Fürth) Adler (born 1882). Both parents were murdered by the Gestapo during World War II, after they were deported in 1942, from Vienna, Austria, to Izbica concentration camp, which served as a transfer camp, to the Bełżec extermination camp in occupied Poland on May 15, 1942. His paternal grandparents, Jakob and Eveline Adler are buried in Neuhaus (now Jindřichův Hradec), Hebrew Cemetery. His maternal grandparents, Albert and Katherine Fürth are buried in Sušice, Czech Republic.

During the 1930s many now-famous musicians, including Adler, emigrated to the United States to escape from Nazism. Adler left for the United States on October 9, 1938. He sailed from Rotterdam, Holland ,in 1938 on the SS Statendam. He was naturalized on March 21, 1944.

== Education ==
Kurt Adler began studying music at age six under cantor Jacob Fürnberg, in Jindřichův Hradec. His first public appearance was at age fourteen.

His entire musical education was in Vienna, Austria. Among his teachers were Richard Robert, Fanny Boehm-Kramer, Alexander Manhart (1875–1936) (piano); Karl Weigl (1881–1949), Guido Adler (1855–1941), Wilhelm Fischer (1886–1962) (theory); Ferdinand Foll (1867–1929), Hermann Weigert (1890–1955), and Erich Kleiber (1890–1956) (conducting). In 1925, he graduated from the classical Akademisches Gymnasium, Vienna. In 1927, he earned a degree in musicology from the University of Vienna, corresponding to Master of Arts, Philosophical Faculty of the University of Vienna.

== Career ==
Kurt Adler began his professional career in Germany on the musical staff of the Berlin State Opera. He later conducted at the New German Theatre in Prague and Städtische Oper in Berlin. He joined the Metropolitan Opera in 1943, under the management of Edward Johnson, then in conjunction with Rudolf Bing, from 1945 to 1973. He was chorusmaster and lead conductor.

Maestro Adler's press announcement upon his recruitment as chorusmaster of the Metropolitan Opera in New York City said, "That since Giulio Setti's time, ten years ago, there never has been a single chorusmaster for the entire Italian, French, German, English repertoire and with my appointment, the gradual reorganization and training will again be centralized in one hand."

== Engagements ==
- 1927–1929 Assistant conductor, Berlin State Opera
- 1929–1932 Conductor, Prague German Opera Theater
- 1932–1933 Conductor, Berlin Municipal Opera House
- 1933–1938 Conducting symphony concerts and opera all over Europe
- 1933 Conductor of orchestral concerts, Musikverein, Vienna
- 1933 Founder of the Unio Opera Company, Vienna
- 1933–1935 First Conductor, Academic Opera and Ballet Theater of the USSR, Kyiv
- 1935–1937 Founder, musical director, and first conductor of the Symphonic Orchestra Stalingrad (Soviet Union)
- 1938–1943 U.S.A. Conducting concerts and concertizing as pianist all over U.S. and Canada
- 1938–1939 Pianist, three transcontinental tours of the United States
- 1939–1941 Musical director, Friendship House, New York City
- 1943 Assistant Conductor to Leopold Stokowski, Metropolitan Opera, New York City
- 1943–1973 Chorus Master, Conductor, Metropolitan Opera, New York City, New York (USA)
- 1944–1947 Musical director, Opera Nacional and Opera de Mexico, Mexico City
- 1952 Musical director, Central City Opera Festival, Central City, Colorado
- 1954 Musical director of opera performances at Greek Theatre, Hollywood, California
- Conductor of numerous broadcasts and television performances of operatic and symphonic music

== Teaching positions ==
- 1929–1932 Organizer and Conductor of the Students Orchestra of the German Academy of Music (Deutsche Akademie für Musik und darstellende Kunst in Prag), Prague, Czechoslovakia
- 1934–1935 Conductor, orchestra of the Kyiv Conservatory of Music, Kyiv (Soviet Union)
- 1935–1937 Professor of the Opera class at the Conservatory of Music, Stalingrad (Soviet Union)
- 1938–1941 Teacher of piano, theory; classes in chamber music; coach; New York City

== Publications ==
- 1943 Adler, K.: Songs of many wars, from the sixteenth to the twentieth century. New York, Howell, Soskin 1943, 221p. Edited and arranged by Kurt Adler. (A collection of fighting songs which oppressed people of all times and nation have sung in their fight against tyranny.)
- 1953–1956 Adler, K.: Operatic anthology: celebrated arias selected from operas by old and modern composers, in five volumes / compiled by Kurt Adler. New York, G. Schirmer c1953–1956. Edited and arranged by Kurt Adler.
- 1955 Adler, K.: Famous operatic choruses. New York, G. Schirmer c1955, Edited and arranged by Kurt Adler.
- 1956 Adler, K.: The Prima donna‘s album: 42 celebrated arias from famous operas. New York, G. Schirmer c1956, Edited and arranged by Kurt Adler.
- 1960 Adler, K.: Songs From Light Operas for soprano. New York, G. Schirmer 1960, Edited and arranged by Kurt Adler.
- 1965 Adler, K.: The art of accompanying and coaching. Minneapolis, University of Minnesota Press 1965.
- 1967Adler, K.: Phonetics and diction in singing: Italian, French, Spanish, German. Minneapolis, University of Minnesota Press 1967.
- 1968 Adler, K.: Duets from the great operas, for soprano and baritone. New York, G. Schirmer 1968, Edited and arranged by Kurt Adler.
- 1968 Adler, K.: Duets from the great operas, for soprano and tenor. New York, G. Schirmer, Edited and arranged by Kurt Adler.
- 1971 Adler, K.: The art of accompanying and coaching. New York, Da Capo Press
- 1974 Adler, K.: Phonetics and diction in singing: Italian, French, Spanish, German. Minneapolis, University of Minnesota Press, 2nd ed.
- 1975–1977 Adler, K.: Operatic anthology: celebrated arias selected from operas by old and modern composers, in five volumes / Edited and arranged by Kurt Adler. Rochester, N.Y., National Braille Association 1975–1977.
- 1976 Adler, K.: The art of accompanying and coaching. New York, Da Capo Press
- 1980 Adler, K.: The art of accompanying and coaching. New York, Da Capo Press
- 1985 Adler, K.: The art of accompanying and coaching. New York, Da Capo Press

== Personal life ==
In 1937, Adler partnered with Nina Boldin (1912–2004) in Stalingrad, USSR, which produced a daughter, Ingrid.

On March 10, 1948, Adler married Irene Hawthorne (1917–1986) (birth name Irene McNutt), former prima ballerina soloist of the Metropolitan Opera.

On September 16, 1965, Adler married Christiane Tocco, which produced a daughter, Eveline (Eva).

On September 21, 1977, Adler died at home in his sleep, in Butler, New Jersey, of uremia/chronic glomerulonephritis.

His instruments were the piano, organ, harmonica, harpsichord, and celesta. Adler is a polyglot, able to speak a multitude of languages.
