= Aud Schønemann =

Norwegian actress (1922–2006)

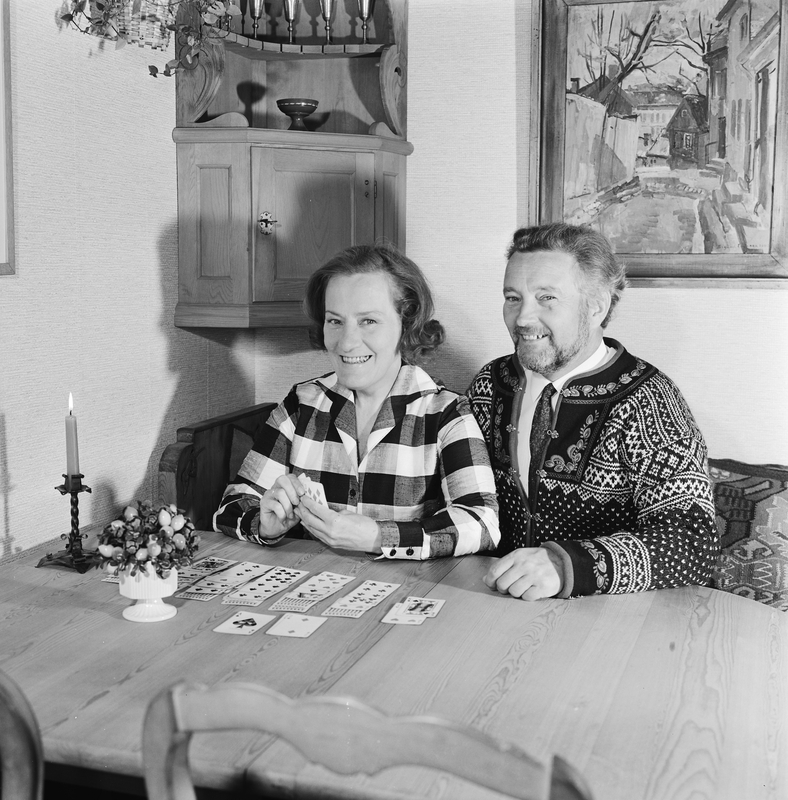
- Aud Schønemann with her husband Jan Pande-Rolfsen, 1970
- Born: 13 November 1922; Østre Aker
- Died: 30 October 2006 (aged 83)
- Occupation: actress
- Father: August Schønemann

Aud Schønemann (13 November 1922 – 30 October 2006) was a Norwegian actress, regarded by many as the leading comedienne of her generation in Norway.

She was born in Østre Aker, and was a daughter of actor August Schønemann and dancer Dagmar Kristensen.

She started her acting career in 1945, and is probably best known for her role as Valborg Jensen in the Olsenbanden movies, as Marve Fleksnes' mother on the long-running Norwegian television comedy Fleksnes Fataliteter and as the janitor's wife in the comedy film Skulle det dukke opp flere lik er det bare å ringe (based on the play BusyBody by Jack Popplewell).

In 1993, she was knighted in the Royal Norwegian Order of St Olav.
