= Erik Amundsen =

Norwegian jazz bassist

- Born: 1 February 1937; Oslo, Norway
- Died: 22 February 2015 (aged 78)
- Genre: Jazz
- Occupation: Musician
- Instrument: Upright bass

Erik Amundsen (1 February 1937 – 22 February 2015) was a Norwegian jazz bassist from Oslo.

== Career ==
Amundsen debuted in 1954 within the trio of his brother Arvid Amundsen and Atle Hammer Sextet. Throughout the 1950s, he played in the Karl Otto Hoff Trio, Eilif Holm Quartet and released an album with Mikkel Flagstad in 1956. In the 1960s, he was involved in the European All Stars in Berlin (1961) and was awarded the Buddyprisen in 1962. Amundsen performed on recordings with Karin Krog, Bernt Anker Steen, Erik Andresen, Laila Dalseth, Magni Wentzel, Bjørn Johansen, Jan Berger and Bjarne Nerem. He played regularly at the Metropol Jazz Centre in Oslo, including with visiting musicians such as Bud Powell. Amundsen also played with Al Cohn and Bengt Hallberg, within bands led by Per Borthen and Totti Bergh, and the groups VSOBOP, Street Swingers, Storeslem and Jazz A Pell Oktett.

His own Erik Amundsen Sextet (2000) included Atle Hammer (trumpet), Jan Erik Ulseth (saxophone), Erling Wicklund (trombone), Roger Amundsen (guitar) and Eyvind Olsen (drums). After a stroke in 2002, he was unable to play his instrument. In 2006, he was honored by a concert at the club Cosmopolite in Oslo) A selection of nearly forty tracks from his recording career can be heard on the album Portrait of a norwegian jazz artist (2005).

Amundsen died on 22 February 2015. He was 78.

== Honors ==
- 1962: Buddyprisen

== Discography ==
- 1993: Tenderly, with Monica Borgen
- 1995: Remember, with Totti Bergh
- 1998: The Oslo Jazz Circle jubilee concert in the fall of 1998
- 2005: Portrait of a Norwegian jazz artist (Gemini Records)

Awards
Preceded by Mikkel Flagstad	Recipient of the Buddyprisen; 1961	Succeeded by Bjørn Johansen
