= Hermann Weigert =

German musician (1890–1955)

Hermann Oskar Weigert (20 October 1890 – 2 April 1955) was a German vocal coach, pianist, and conductor. He was a vocal coach and accompanist for the Metropolitan Opera for thirteen years. Recognized as an authority on the works of Richard Wagner, he served as a consultant to the Bayreuth Festival from 1951 until his death four years later. He was the husband, accompanist and, voice teacher of Swedish soprano Astrid Varnay, whose career he managed to international success. He also served as accompanist and vocal coach for soprano Kirsten Flagstad for many years.

== Life and career ==
Weigert was born in Breslau, Province of Silesia, German Empire (today Wrocław, Poland). Trained at the Berlin Hochschule für Musik, Weigert began his career working as a vocal coach at the Magdeburg Opera and at Theater Lübeck. He left those posts to join the conducting staff at the Berlin State Opera in 1920 where he worked with Kurt Adler, Dimitri Mitropoulos, Otto Klemperer, George Szell, and Heinz Tietjen. While conducting in Berlin, he simultaneously worked as a professor at the Royal Berlin Academy of Music.

Due to his Jewish ancestry and the rise of the Nazi party in Berlin, Weigert resigned from his post at the Berlin State Opera in 1934. After working for a brief period in South Africa, he joined the staff of the Metropolitan Opera in New York City where he worked as the chief vocal coach and accompanist for the German repertoire. At the Met he became known as an expert on the works of Richard Wagner, and became the primary vocal coach to sopranos Kirsten Flagstad and Astrid Varnay; Varney and Weigert married in 1944.

In 1948 Weigert left his post at the Met and returned to Europe with Flagstad and Varnay where he helped orchestrate a successful international launch to his wife's career, beginning with the Royal Opera House in London. In 1951 Varnay made an acclaimed debut at the Bayreuth Festival where she appeared annually for the next seventeen years. Weigert served on the musical staff of the Bayreuth Festival from 1951 to 1955.

In addition to managing his wife's career, Weigert worked as a guest conductor at numerous German opera houses from 1948 to 1955, including conducting several performances with his wife in the cast. He notably conducted recordings of his wife portraying the roles of Isolde in Tristan and Isolde, the title role in Salome, and Brünnhilde in Götterdämmerung; Götterdämmerung won the Grand Prix du Disque.

Weigert died of a heart attack at the age of 65 in Manhattan.
