= Kjærlighet paa pinde =

1922 film

- Directed by: Erling Eriksen
- Written by: Erling Eriksen
- Produced by: Leif Sinding
- Starring: Ellen Sinding; August Schønemann; Conrad Arnesen
- Cinematography: Erling Knudsen
- Distributed by: Skandinavisk film-central
- Release date: 1922
- Running time: 44 minutes
- Country: Norway
- Language: Norwegian

Kjærlighet paa pinde: sommerspøk i 4 akter (Love on a Stick: A Summer Comedy in Four Acts) is a Norwegian silent film from 1922. The comedian August Schønemann played Alexander Snobmann in his only film role. A bright future had been anticipated for him in silent film, but he died in 1925.

Other actors in the film include Ellen Sinding and Conrad Arnesen, and it was directed by Erling Eriksen. The film was Leif Sinding's first work in Norwegian cinematography as a producer. The film can be seen for free at the National Library of Norway website.

== Plot ==
Kjærlighet paa pinde (1922)

Alexander Snobman and Philip Helt compete for the favor of the dancer Eva Sommers. One day Snobman meets her in the woods and tries to win her over, but he then has to resort to force. Eva shouts for help, and the engineer Helt comes to rescue her. Snobman tries to win Eva several times, but is stopped in turn by a bull, Eva's grandmother, Nestor the guard dog, and an angry goat.

== Censorship ==
In the film's fourth act, an undressing scene was edited out of the film.

== Cast ==
- Ellen Sinding as Eva Sommer
- August Schønemann as Alexander Snobmann
- Conrad Arnesen as Philip Helt
