= August Schønemann =

Norwegian singer, actor and comedian (1891–1925)

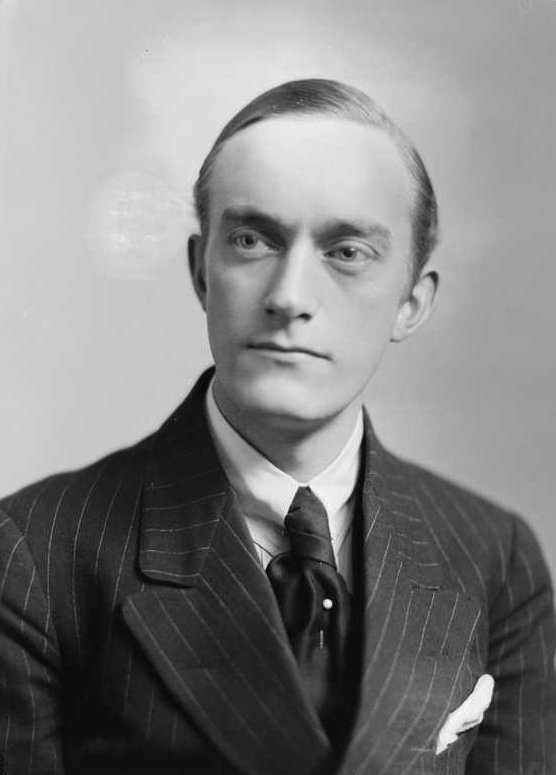
August Schønemann

August Schønemann (né Pettersen; 30 May 1891 – 18 February 1925) was a Norwegian singer, actor, and comedian. From the mid-1910s to his death in 1925, he was among the most popular entertainers in Norway. He was father of Aud Schønemann.

August was born in Kristiania. He made his staged debut at Østre Theater in 1906 and performed at various theatres over the years. He had his breakthrough in early 1915 with the song "Neutralitetsværnet" in the revue Futt at Benno Singer's Theatre Moderne. His most famous act was possibly a duet with Lalla Carlsen at Chat Noir, in a Hamlet parody in the revue Uten en tråd. He also starred in one film production, the four-reel comedy Kjærlighet paa pinde (1922), directed by Erling Eriksen.

Schønemann died in February 1925 due to pernicious anemia, being at the height of his popularity, at the age of 33.

== Literature ==
- Mathiesen, Snorre SmÁri (2022). From Artisan's Son to Hamlet: The Life of August Schønemann, Comedy King of Norway. BearManor Media. ISBN 9798887710488.
