= Benno Singer =

Hungarian-born British theatre entrepreneur (1875–1934)

- Born: Bernhard Henry Singer; 28 February 1875; Budapest, Hungary
- Died: 17 May 1934 (aged 59); Dublin, Ireland
- Occupation: Entertainment administrator

Bernhard Henry "Benno" Singer (28 February 1875 – 17 May 1934) was a Hungarian-born British entertainment administrator.

He was born in Budapest, and settled in London from the age of eleven. He was married twice, first to Evelyn Mary Davis, and later to Mella Marie Schmidt. Singer was responsible for the entertainment at the 1914 Jubilee Exhibition in Kristiania, Norway. He was a central person in the entertainment industry in Kristiania from 1914. He established and managed the revue stage Theatre Moderne in Kristiania from 1914 to 1925. The first revue staged on Theatre Moderne was Futt from 1915, which is remembered for August Schønemann's breakthrough as comedian. Singer also established and managed the Opera Comique from 1918 to 1921. He died in Dublin in 1934.
