= Erling Eriksen =

Norwegian film director and screenwriter

- Born: January 19, 1878; Kristiania, Norway
- Died: 1957
- Occupation(s): Film director, screenwriter

Erling Eriksen (January 19, 1878 – 1957) was a Norwegian film director, screenwriter, and film producer.

Eriksen was born in Kristiania (now Oslo). He directed his only film, the comedy Kjærlighet paa pinde, in 1922, for which he also wrote the screenplay. In 1925 he produced Harry Ivarson's film Fager er lien.

== Filmography ==
=== Director and screenwriter ===
- 1922: Kjærlighet paa pinde

=== Producer ===
- 1925: Fager er lien
