= Waldemar Thrane =

Norwegian composer, violinist and conductor

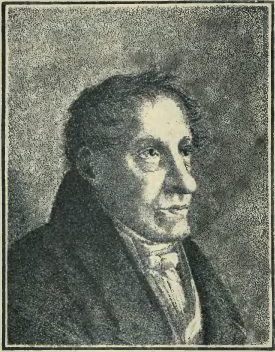
Waldemar Thrane

Waldemar Thrane (8 October 1790 – 30 December 1828) was a Norwegian composer, violinist and conductor.

== Biography ==
Waldemar Thrane was born in Christiania (now Oslo), Norway. He was the son of Paul Thrane (1751–1830), a businessman and timber merchant, and was an uncle of the author and journalist Marcus Thrane.

From 1814 to 1815, he studied music in Paris. In 1819, Thrane made his debut concert in Oslo as conductor, violinist and composer. He served as conductor of the Christiania Public Theatre Orchestra (Christiania offentlige Theaters orkester) and The Musical Lyceum (Det musikalske Lyceum) until he fell ill and was replaced by Ole Bull in 1828.

He died at 38 years of age.

Waldemar Thranes gate (Waldemar Thrane Street), located in St. Hanshaugen in Oslo, is named in his honor.

== Other sources ==
- Benestad, Finn (1961) Waldemar Thrane (Oslo: Universitetsforlaget)
