= Maja Flagstad =

Norwegian musician and conductor

- Born: Marie Johnsrud; November 15, 1871
- Died: January 18, 1958 (aged 86)
- Genre: classical
- Occupations: pianist, choral conductor

Marie "Maja" Flagstad (née Johnsrud) (November 15, 1871 – January 18, 1958) was a Norwegian pianist, choral conductor, and répétiteur.

== Life ==
Born Marie Johnsrud, she was from the Johnsrud farm in the village of Eidsvoll Verk. She was the sister of the organist Hans Nielsen Johnsrud (1864–1948). She married the musician Michael Flagstad (1869–1930) and was the mother of Kirsten Flagstad (1895–1962), whom she taught voice and later accompanied on recordings. Her other children were also musicians: the conductor Ole Flagstad, pianist Lasse Flagstad, and singer Karen-Marie Flagstad. The family lived in Vinderen in Christiania (now Oslo).

Already at a very young age, Maja Flagstad was active in the capital's music scene, first at the Christiania Theater in 1891, and later at the Central Theater, where her husband conducted. At the opening of the cabaret theater Chat Noir, she accompanied Bokken Lasson singing "Tuppen og Lillemor" (the Norwegian version of "I Don't Want to Play in Your Yard") on March 1, 1912. The Flagstad family was central in the short-lived Opera Comique (1918–1921), where Kirsten also sang. Later the family performed at the Mayol Theater (in 1921) and Casino (1924–1927).

Maja Flagstad was the first conductor of the Oslo Philharmonic Choir (in 1922). She was a guest conductor at the National Theater in Bergen and was credited with discovering the performing artist and bass singer Bjarne Bø during a performance at Bergen Cathedral in 1929. She worked extensively as a répétiteur, accompanying well-known artists such as Hauk Aabel and Erik Ole Bye.
