= Kirsten Flagstad =

Norwegian operatic singer (1895–1962)

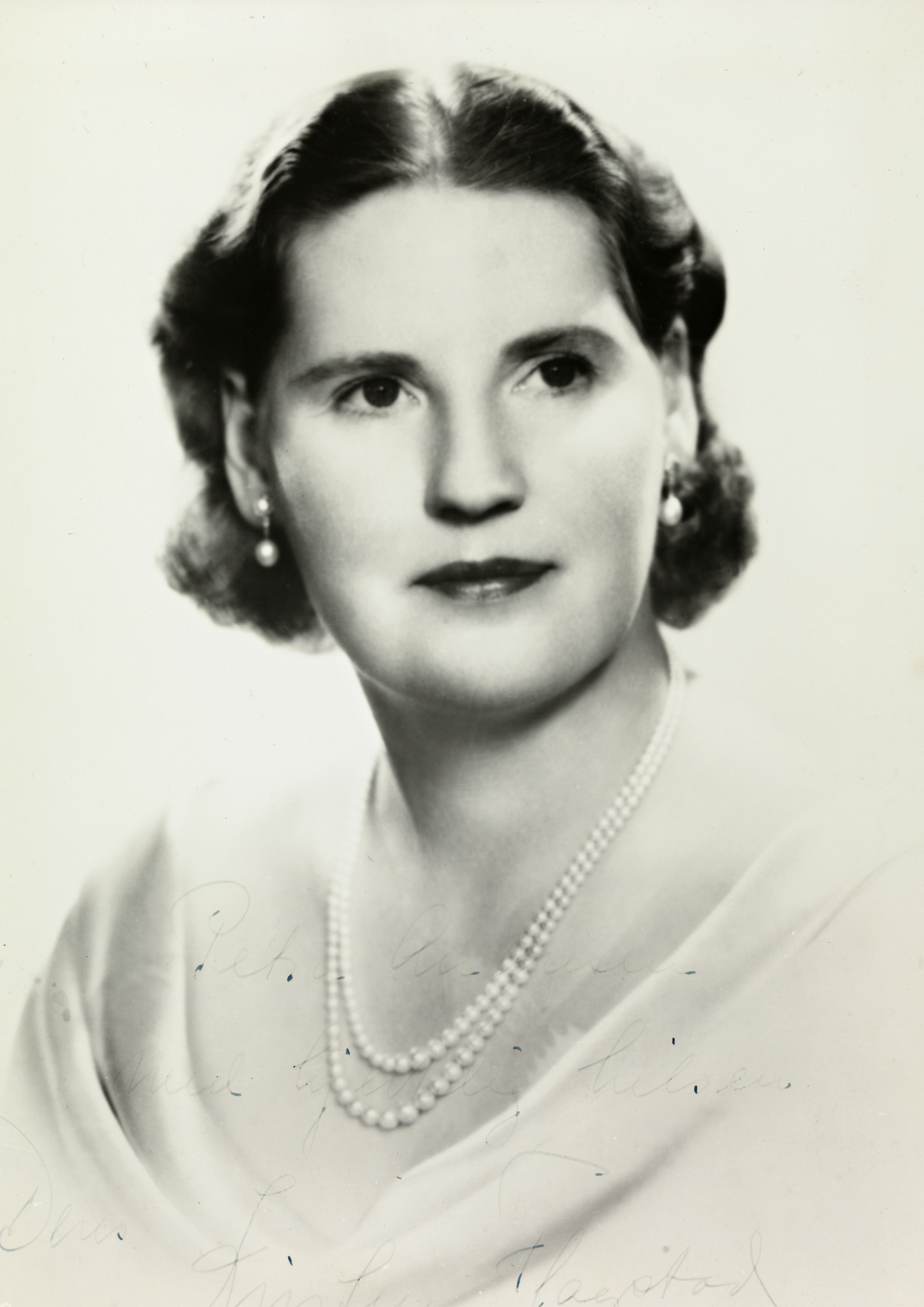
- Flagstad c. 1940–45
- Born: Kirsten Malfrid Flagstad; 12 July 1895; Hamar, Norway
- Died: 7 December 1962 (aged 67); Oslo, Norway
- Resting place: Vestre Gravlund
- Occupation: Operatic soprano
- Years active: 1913–1957
- Spouses: Sigurd Hall (m. 1919; div. 1930); Henry Thomas Ingvald Johansen (m. 1930; died 1946)
- Children: 1
- Parents: Michael Flagstad; Maja Flagstad
- Relatives: Karen-Marie Flagstad (sister)
- Awards: Order of St. Olav; Hollywood Walk of Fame

Kirsten Malfrid Flagstad (12 July 1895 – 7 December 1962) was a Norwegian operatic soprano, who was the outstanding Wagnerian soprano of her era. Her triumphant debut in New York on 2 February 1935 is one of the legends of opera. Giulio Gatti-Casazza, the longstanding General Manager of the Metropolitan Opera said, "I have given America two great gifts — Caruso and Flagstad."

Called "the voice of the century", she ranks among the greatest singers of the 20th century. Desmond Shawe-Taylor wrote of her in the New Grove Dictionary of Opera: "No one within living memory surpassed her in sheer beauty and consistency of line and tone."

== Early life and career ==
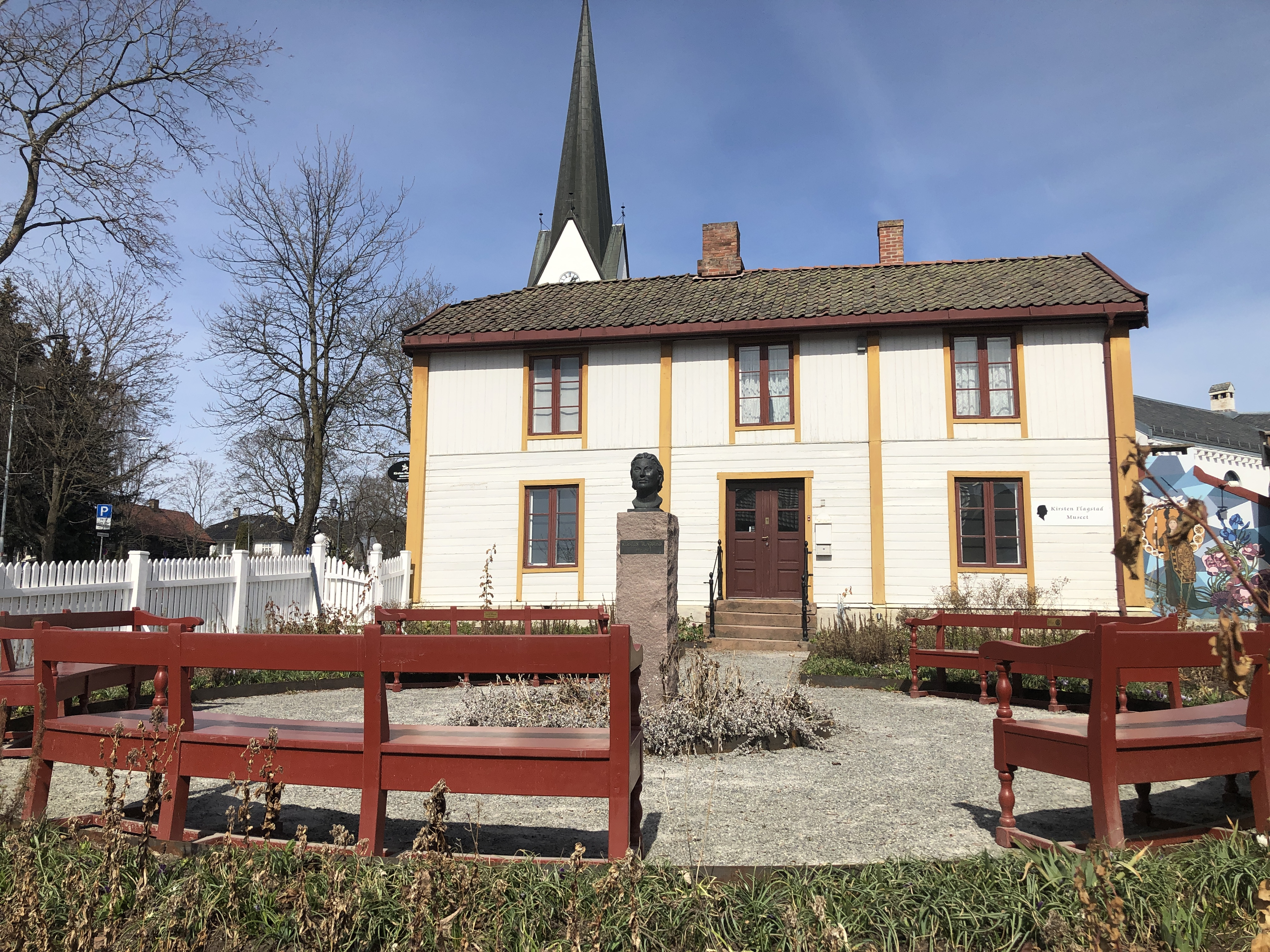
Kirsten Flagstad Museum in Hamar

Flagstad was born in Hamar, Norway, in her grandparents' home, now the Kirsten Flagstad Museum. Though she never actually lived in Hamar, she always considered it her home town. She was raised in Oslo within a musical family; her father Michael Flagstad was a conductor and her mother Maja Flagstad a pianist. Their other children were also musicians: the conductor Ole Flagstad, pianist Lasse Flagstad, and soprano Karen-Marie Flagstad.

She received her early musical training in Oslo and made her stage debut at the National Theatre, as Nuri in Eugen d'Albert's Tiefland in 1913. Her first recordings were made between 1913 and 1915. After further study in Stockholm with Dr. Gillis Bratt, she pursued a career in opera and operetta in Norway. In 1919, she married her first husband Sigurd Hall and a year later gave birth to her only child, a daughter, Else Marie Hall. Later that year she signed up with the newly created Opera Comique in Oslo, under the direction of Alexander Varnay and Benno Singer. Varnay was the father of the famous soprano Astrid Varnay. Flagstad's ability to learn roles quickly was noted, as it often took her only a few days to do so. She sang Desdemona opposite Leo Slezak, Minnie, Amelia and other lesser roles at the Opera Comique.

She sang at the Stora Teatern of Gothenburg, Sweden, between 1928 and 1934, and made her debut there singing Agathe in Der Freischütz by Weber. In 1930, a revival of Nielsen's Saul and David featured Flagstad singing the role of Michal. On 31 May 1930 she married her second husband, the Norwegian industrialist and lumber merchant Henry Johansen, who subsequently helped her in expanding her career. In 1932 she made her debut in Rodelinda by Handel.

After singing operetta and lyric roles such as Marguerite in Faust for over a decade, Flagstad decided to take on heavier operatic roles such as Tosca and Aida. The part of Aida helped to unleash Flagstad's dramatic abilities. In 1932, she took on the role of Isolde in Richard Wagner's Tristan und Isolde and appeared to have found her true voice. Ellen Gulbranson, a Swedish soprano at Bayreuth, persuaded Winifred Wagner to audition Flagstad for the Bayreuth Festival. Flagstad sang minor roles in 1933, but at the next season in 1934, she sang the roles of Sieglinde in Die Walküre and Gutrune in Götterdämmerung at the Festival, opposite Frida Leider as Brünnhilde.

== Debut at the Metropolitan Opera ==
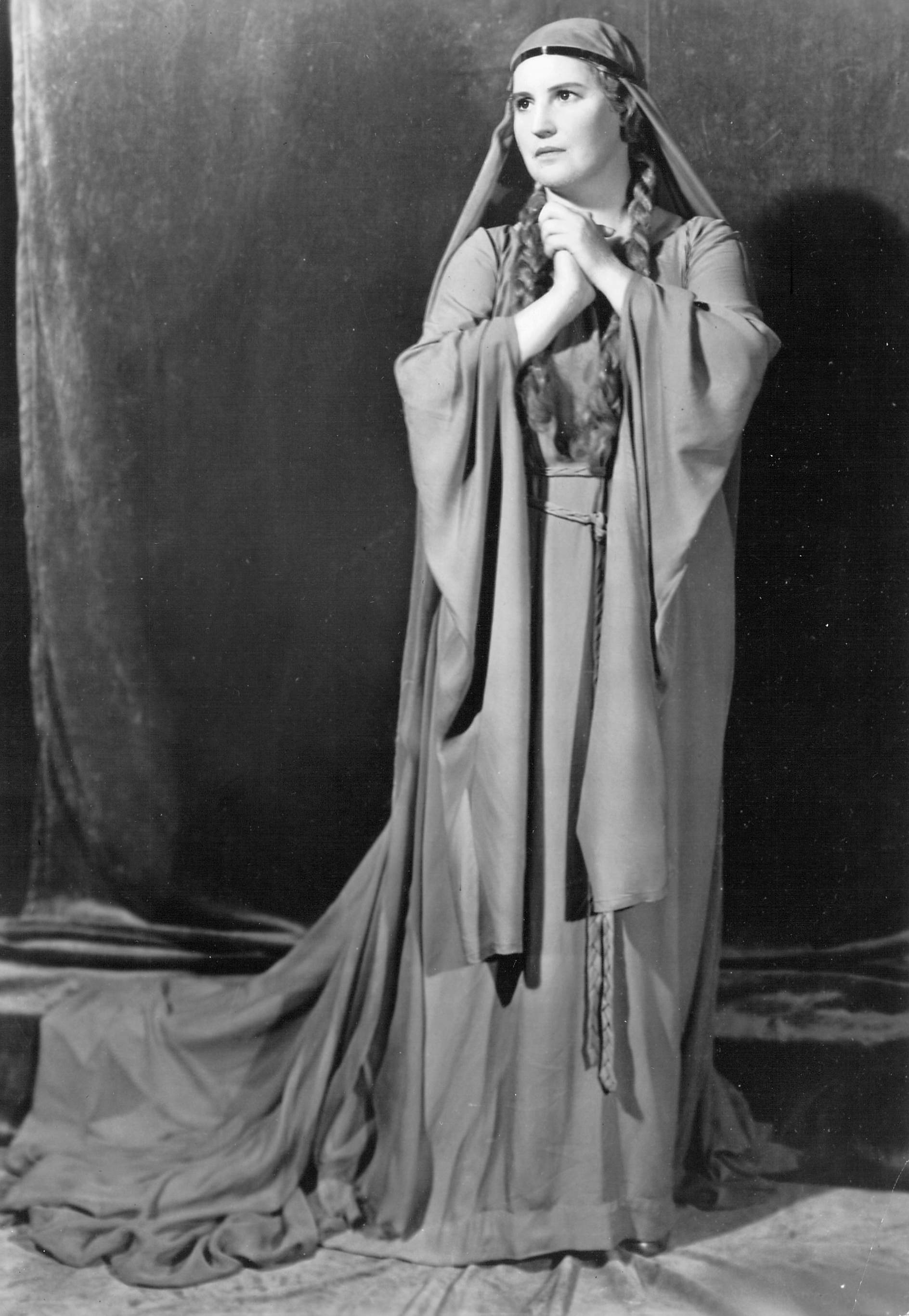
Flagstad as Isolde in Richard Wagner's Tristan und Isolde

Flagstad was first noticed by Otto Hermann Kahn, then chairman of the board of the Metropolitan Opera, on a trip to Scandinavia in 1929, and Met management made overtures soon after. Their letters were never answered, however. At the time, Flagstad had just met her soon to be second husband and had even briefly considered giving up opera altogether. Then, in the summer of 1934, when the Met needed a replacement for Frida Leider, Flagstad agreed to audition for conductor Artur Bodanzky and Met general manager Giulio Gatti-Casazza in St Moritz in August 1934, and she was engaged immediately. Upon leaving St Moritz, Bodanzky's parting words for Flagstad were "Come to New York as soon as you know these roles (Isolde, the three Brünnhildes, Leonore in Fidelio, and the Marschallin in Der Rosenkavalier). And above all do not go and get fat! Your slender, youthful figure is not the least reason you were engaged."

At the Met Flagstad became a pupil of vocal coach Hermann Weigert, who prepared her for all her roles with the company. Her debut at the Met, as Sieglinde in Die Walküre on the afternoon of 2 February 1935, created a sensation, though it was not planned as a special event. By this time, after weeks of rehearsals, Met management already knew what they had, but they nonetheless decided on a low key debut. Flagstad was unknown in the United States at the time. The performance was, however, broadcast nationwide on the Met's weekly syndicated radio program, and the first inkling of the deluge of critical praise to come was given when intermission host and former Met star Geraldine Farrar discarded her prepared notes, overwhelmed by what she had just heard, and breathlessly announced that a new star had just been born. Days later, Flagstad sang Isolde, and later that month, she performed Brünnhilde in Die Walküre and Götterdämmerung for the first time. Before the end of the season, Flagstad sang Elsa in Lohengrin, Elisabeth in Tannhäuser, and her first Kundry in Parsifal.

== Further career in America and elsewhere ==
Almost overnight, she had established herself as the pre-eminent Wagnerian soprano of the era. It has been said that she saved the Metropolitan Opera from looming bankruptcy. Her performances, sometimes three or four a week in her early days at the Met, quickly sold out at the box office as soon as they went on sale. Her services to the Met were not from box office receipts alone; her nationwide personal appeals to radio listeners during Saturday matinee intermissions brought thousands of dollars in donations to the Met's coffers. Fidelio (1936 and later) was her only non-Wagnerian role at the Met before the war. In 1935, she performed all three Brünnhildes in the San Francisco Opera's Ring cycle. In 1937, she first appeared at the Chicago City Opera Company.

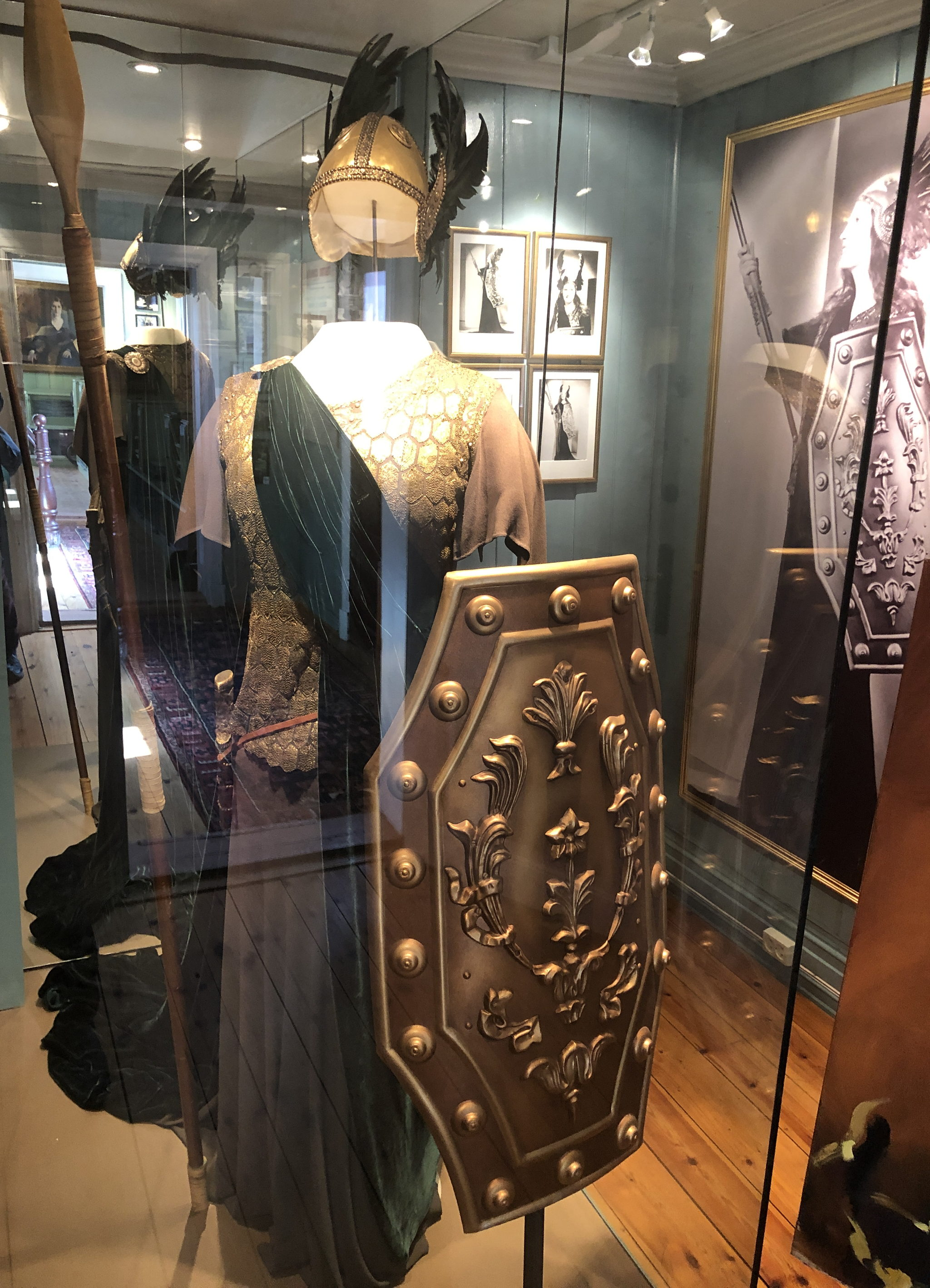
Flagstad's costume for Hollywood's The Big Broadcast of 1938, where she was filmed singing Brünnhilde's Battle Cry from Wagner's Die Walküre

In 1936 and 1937, Flagstad performed the roles of Isolde, Brünnhilde, and Senta at the Royal Opera House, Covent Garden, under Sir Thomas Beecham, Fritz Reiner and Wilhelm Furtwängler, arousing as much enthusiasm there as she had in New York. She also toured Australia in 1938. Hollywood also tried to cash in on Flagstad fever, after her sudden popularity in the US in the mid-1930s, with her many appearances on NBC Radio, The Kraft Music Hall with Bing Crosby, and regular appearances on CBS's The Ford Sunday Evening Hour. Though Flagstad was not interested in stardom or Hollywood contracts per se, she did make trips to Hollywood during the late 1930s for publicity photo shoots, public appearances, concerts at the Hollywood Bowl, and she filmed a rendition of Brünnhilde's Battle Cry from Die Walküre for the Hollywood variety show anthology The Big Broadcast of 1938, in which she was introduced to American film audiences by Bob Hope. Flagstad and Sonja Henie are the only two Norwegians to have their own stars on Hollywood's "Walk of Fame".

Her career at the Met, however, was not without its ups-and-downs. Flagstad got involved in a long-running feud with tenor co-star Lauritz Melchior after Melchior took offense to some comments Flagstad made about "stupid publicity photos" during a game of bridge in Flagstad's hotel suite while the two were on tour together in Rochester, NY. Present during the infamous bridge game were Flagstad, Melchior and his wife, and Edwin McArthur. Afterwards, Melchior fanned the flames further by insisting that there be no solo curtain calls for Flagstad when the two performed together. Audiences had no clue that, despite the marvelous and sometimes historic performances, the two never said a word to each other off stage for the next two years. It was Flagstad's husband Henry Johansen who finally brought the two together to make peace.

Flagstad also feuded with the Met's general manager, Edward Johnson, after conductor Artur Bodanzky's death, when she asked to be conducted for a few performances by her accompanist, Edwin McArthur, rather than by the Met's new conductor Erich Leinsdorf. Flagstad had wanted this for McArthur, whom she had taken under her wing. Johnson refused and would not hear of it any further. Flagstad did get her way, though; she went over Johnson's head and discussed the matter with the Met's board of directors, particularly David Sarnoff, RCA and NBC founder and chairman. It was Sarnoff who made the arrangements for McArthur to begin conducting Met productions on a limited basis. Her relationship with Johnson improved, however; just before Flagstad left the Met in 1941, on the night of her 100th performance of Isolde, she received 100 roses, courtesy of Melchior and Johnson.

== Return to Norway ==
Having received repeated and cryptic cablegrams from her husband, who had returned to Norway a year and a half earlier, Flagstad was forced to consider leaving the United States in 1941. Though dismissing the political implications of the departure of someone of her fame from the United States to German-occupied Norway, it was nonetheless a difficult decision for her. She had many friends, colleagues, and of course many fans all over the US. Even more importantly, her 20-year-old daughter Else had married an American named Arthur Dusenberry and was living with her new husband on a dude ranch in Bozeman, Montana. It was Edwin McArthur who gave the bride away at the wedding in Bozeman a year earlier. Nonetheless, against the best advice of her friends and colleagues, including former president Herbert Hoover, who pleaded with her to stay out of Europe, she returned to Norway via Lisbon, Madrid, Barcelona, Marseille, and Berlin in April, 1941.

Though during the war she performed only in Sweden and Switzerland, countries not occupied by German forces, this fact did not temper the storm of public opinion that hurt her personally and professionally for the next several years. Her husband was arrested after the war for profiteering during the occupation that involved his lumber business. This arrest, together with her decision to remain in occupied Norway, made her unpopular, particularly in the United States. Both the Norwegian ambassador and columnist Walter Winchell spoke out against her. In 1948, she performed several benefit concerts for the United Jewish Appeal. In defense of Flagstad's husband, Henry Johansen, after his death it was revealed that during the occupation he was arrested by the Gestapo and held for eight days. Also, one of Johansen's sons by his first marriage, Henry Jr, had been a member of the Norwegian underground throughout the war.

== Post-war career ==
Flagstad eventually returned to the Metropolitan Opera, invited by its new general manager, Rudolf Bing, who was furiously criticized for this choice: "The greatest soprano of this century must sing in the world's greatest opera house", he replied. She also returned to Covent Garden following its reopening in 1947 (a rare exception – the Opera House, in acute financial straits following the war-time closure, was attempting to build up a house company of English nationals, principally singing in English, in preference to expensive guest stars). In four consecutive seasons from 1948 to 1952, she sang in all her regular Wagnerian roles, including Kundry and Sieglinde. She toured South America in 1948 and returned to San Francisco in 1949, and finally returned to the Met. In the 1950–1951 season, although she was aged well into her 50s, Flagstad showed herself still in remarkable form as Isolde, Brünnhilde and Leonore.

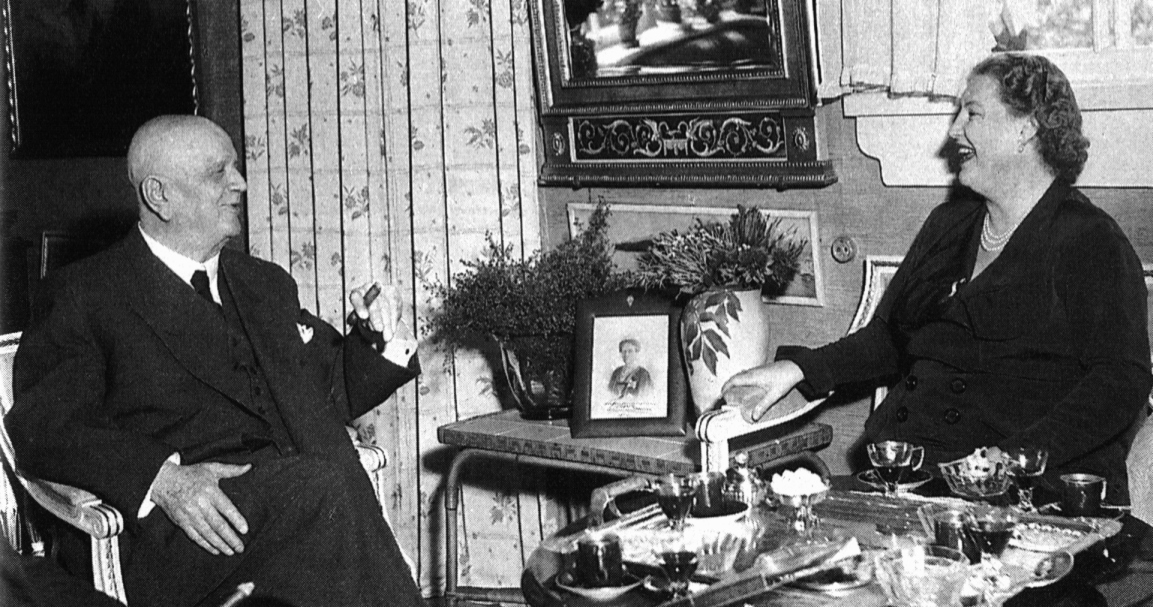
Flagstad visiting Jean Sibelius at his home in June 1952.

Despite the great fanfare surrounding her return to the Met in early 1951, and her success in resuming her roles there, Flagstad decided that it would be her final year singing Wagner on the stage. She had gained quite a bit of weight since her pre-war years at the Met when she sang those long and physically demanding roles night after night. In 1950, when she accepted Bing's invitation, she felt she did not have the stamina she had had as a younger woman. She had also developed an arthritic hip in mid-1951 (and had to consult doctors in New York); this further made the operatic stage difficult for her, especially when singing Wagner. She gave her farewell operatic performance at the Met on 1 April 1952, not as Brünnhilde or Isolde but in the title role of Gluck's Alceste, a role she had learnt in the war years in Norway. In London she appeared as Dido (another recently learnt role) in Purcell's Dido and Aeneas at the first Mermaid Theatre. To celebrate the Coronation of Queen Elizabeth II, in July 1953 Flagstad appeared again as Dido, in Bernard Miles's reconstructed "Globe Theatre", at the Royal Exchange, London. The performance was recorded in studio, and issued by EMI in January 1953. Her final operatic appearance was as Dido in Oslo on June 5, 1953.

She was a guest on the BBC radio show Desert Island Discs on 29 April 1952.

== Four Last Songs ==
During the post-war years, Flagstad was also responsible for the world premiere of Richard Strauss's Four Last Songs. Strauss had written the pieces during his exile in Switzerland following the war (like Flagstad, he had been vilified as a collaborator with the Nazis). He intended them to be premiered by Flagstad, though not because he had her voice in mind. (The songs are better suited to the lyric soprano voice he idealised throughout his life, as exemplified by Elisabeth Schumann and ultimately his wife Pauline de Ahna. Strauss, moreover, had heard praise for Flagstad over the years, but had not heard her sing in person since casting her as the soprano soloist in the 1933 Bayreuth Festival performance of the Beethoven Choral Symphony.) It was, rather, out of sympathy for her difficulties. He sent Flagstad a letter, accompanied by a collection of his own works which he desired her to consider adding to her repertoire, and requested that she give the premiere – together with "a first-class conductor and ensemble" – of these four new orchestral lieder, at that point still in the publication process.

Flagstad accepted the commission, although Strauss did not live to see the premiere. As a conductor, she chose not McArthur (who, though an excellent piano accompanist, was not considered a 'first-class' orchestral conductor) but Wilhelm Furtwängler (also experiencing the repercussions of suspect wartime conduct), and the pair chose Walter Legge's Philharmonia Orchestra, with which they both worked well, to provide the accompaniment. By the time of the premiere on 22 May 1950 at London's Royal Albert Hall, Flagstad was almost 55 years old. Her voice by this point was darker, heavier, and more inflexible than when she had sung for Strauss at Bayreuth, and she was becoming reluctant to venture above the staff, as would be notoriously demonstrated in the recording of Tristan und Isolde two years later; the Strauss songs, particularly the Hesse settings, were thus not ideally suited to her resources, and she found herself tested to her limits. "Frühling" indeed, gave such trouble that Legge, in promoting the concert, was two days before the event advertising the Strauss as "three songs with orchestra". In the event, Flagstad rose to the occasion and included "Frühling" (excluding, however, the highest note), and the close of "Im Abendrot" was followed by a respectful silence in memory of Strauss. The concert, which aside from the Strauss songs consisted of Wagner (including Isolde's Liebestod and Brünnhilde's Immolation), received favorable reviews; recordings of Flagstad's contributions were made from the radio broadcast, and are today commercially available. Flagstad added "September", "Beim Schlafengehen", and "Im Abendrot" to her repertoire, and recordings (technologically superior to those taken at the premiere) exist of these performed in concert; she did not, however, sing "Frühling" again.

== Retirement ==
After her retirement from the stage, she continued to give concert performances and record – first for EMI setting down her definitive account of Isolde in the first commercially released account of Tristan und Isolde, and then for Decca Records. She even made some stereophonic recordings, including excerpts from Wagner's operas with Hans Knappertsbusch and Sir Georg Solti conducting the Vienna Philharmonic Orchestra. In 1958, she sang the part of Fricka in Wagner's Das Rheingold, the first installment in Solti's complete stereophonic set of the Ring Cycle, released by Decca on LP and reel-to-reel tape. She also spent time mentoring young singers in her native country, including contralto Eva Gustavson.

From around 1952, when she gave her Met farewell, until her death 10 years later, Flagstad's health steadily deteriorated. She was in and out of hospitals on an increasing basis both in the number and the length of her stays for a variety of ailments. She even joked with an interviewer in 1958 that Oslo hospital had become her home away from home. From 1958 to 1960, Flagstad was the first Director of the Norwegian National Opera. In her last years she gave many benefit concerts throughout Norway. She was diagnosed with bone marrow cancer in 1960 and died of the disease on 7 December 1962. At her request she was buried in an unmarked grave in Vestre Gravlund Cemetery in the Frogner borough of Oslo. The largest floral arrangement at her funeral was sent by Lauritz Melchior.

== Repertoire ==
Flagstad sang many roles, especially in the early part of her career, before she became famous as a Wagnerian dramatic soprano. This is a list of her principal ones with role debut dates.

- Nuri in Tiefland (d'Albert), Nationaltheatret, Christiania, 12 December 1913
- Germaine in Les cloches de Corneville (Planquette), Nationaltheatret, Christiania, 12 September 1914
- Aagot in Fjeldeventyret (Waldemar Thrane), Open-air theatre, Frogner, Christiania, 23 June 1915
- Nedda in Pagliacci (Leoncavallo), Opera Comique, Christiania, 23 March 1919
- Fatime in Abu Hassan by (Weber), Opera Comique, Christiania, 26 April 1919
- Ganymed in Die schöne Galathee (von Suppé), Opera Comique, Christiania, 25 March 1919
- Desdemona in Otello (Verdi), Opera Comique, Christiania, 26 January 1921
- Amelia in Un ballo in maschera (Verdi), Opera Comique, Christiania, 20 February 1921
- Countess Mariana in Die Frau im Hermelin by (Jean Gilbert), Mayol, Christiania, 15 July 1922
- Princess Jutta in Das Hollandweibchen (Kálmán), Mayol, Christiania, 10 November 1922
- Countess Francesca in Wenn Liebe erwacht (Eduard Künnecke), Mayol, Christiana, 12 September 1923
- Odette Darimonde in Die Bajadere (Kálmán), Mayol, Christiania, 30 September 1923
- Countess in Eine Frau von Format (Michael Krasznay-Krausz), Brunns Teatern, Helsinki, 17 June 1928
- Countess Mariza in Gräfin Mariza (Kálmán), Brunns Teatern, Helsinki, 26 July 1928
- Agathe in Der Freischütz (Weber), Stora Teatern, Gothenburg, 4 October 1928
- Michal in Saul og David (Nielsen), Stora Teatern, Gothenburg, 29 November 1928
- Aida in Aida (Verdi), Stora Teatern, Gothenburg, 7 March 1929
- Elsa in Lohengrin (Wagner), Nationaltheatret, Christiania, 14 June 1929
- Tosca in Tosca (Puccini), Nationaltheatret, Christiania, 28 June 1929
- Anita in Jonny spielt auf (Ernst Krenek), Stora Teatern, Gothenburg, 10 April 1931
- Dorotka in Schwanda the Bagpiper (Jaromír Weinberger), Stora Teatern, Gothenburg, 3 December 1931
- Rodelinda in Rodelinda (Handel), Stora Teatern, Gothenburg, 16 February 1932
- Isolde in Tristan und Isolde (Wagner), Nationaltheatret, Christiania, 29 June 1932
- Eva in Die Meistersinger (Wagner), Nationaltheatret, Christiania, 7 June 1933
- Ortlinde in Die Walküre (Wagner), Bayreuth Festival, 25 July 1933
- Third Norn in Götterdämmerung (Wagner), Bayreuth Festival, 28 July 1933
- Gutrune in Götterdämmerung (Wagner), Bayreuth Festival, 29 July 1934
- Sieglinde in Die Walküre (Wagner), Théatre de la Monnaie, Brussels, 24 May 1934
- Elisabeth in Tannhäuser (Wagner), Stora Teatern, Gothenburg, 5 October 1934
- Leonore in Fidelio (Beethoven) Stora Teatern, Gothenburg, 10 December 1934
- Brünnhilde in Die Walküre (Wagner), Metropolitan Opera, New York, 15 February 1935
- Brünnhilde in Götterdämmerung (Wagner), Metropolitan Opera, New York, 28 February 1935
- Kundry in Parsifal (Wagner), Metropolitan Opera, New York, 17 April 1935
- Senta in Der fliegende Holländer (Wagner), Metropolitan Opera, New York, 7 January 1937
- Rezia in Oberon (Weber), Stadttheater, Zürich, 30 May 1942
- Alceste in Alceste (Gluck), Stadttheater, Zürich, 23 May 1943
- Dido in Dido and Aeneas (Purcell), Mermaid Theatre, London, 9 September 1951

== Legacy ==
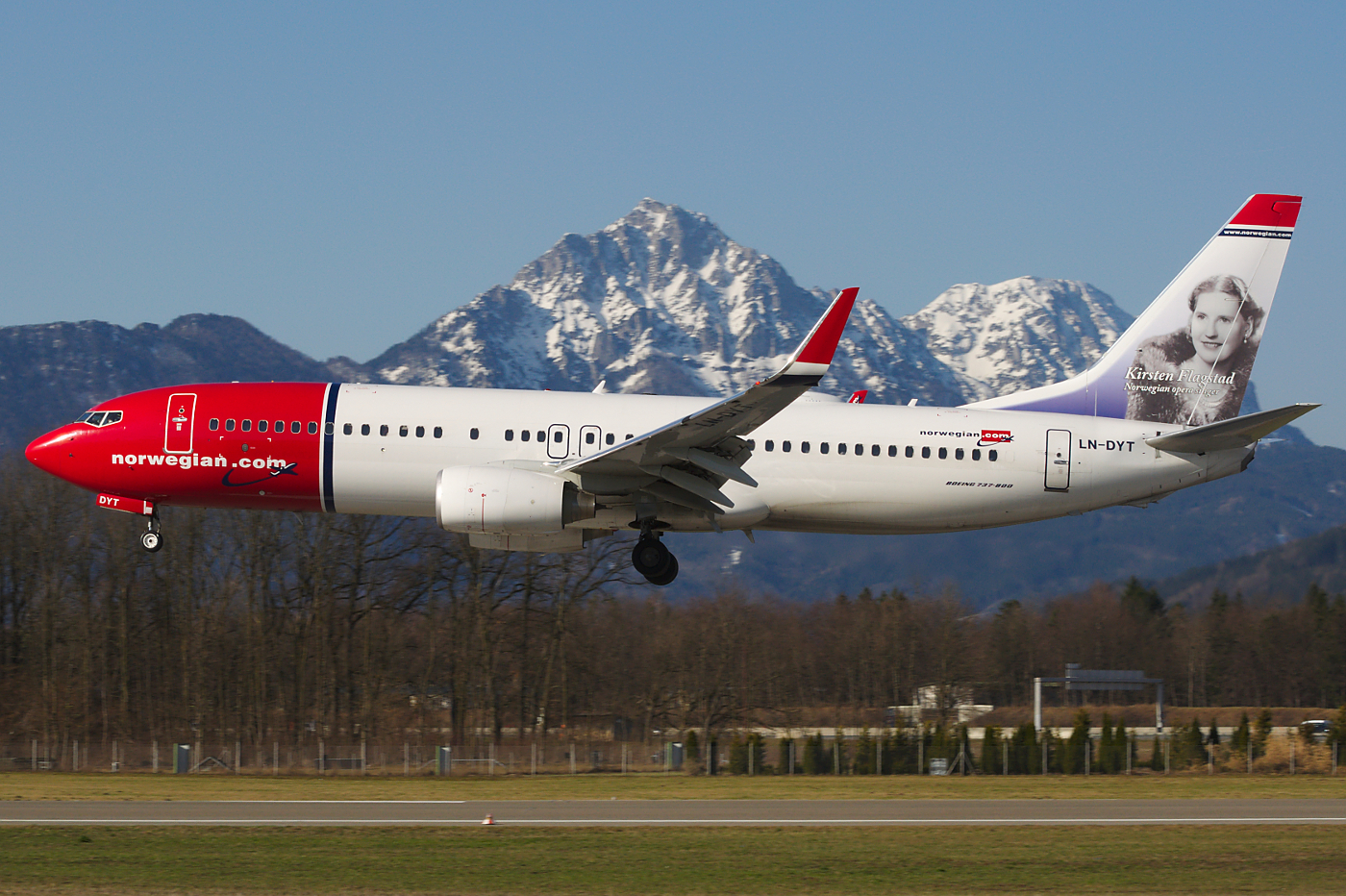
Kirsten Flagstad painted on a Norwegian Air Shuttle airliner.

The Kirsten Flagstad Museum in Hamar, Norway, contains a private collection of opera artifacts. Her costumes draw special attention, and include several examples on loan from the Metropolitan Opera Archives. Her portrait appeared on the Norwegian 100 kroner bill and on the tail section of Norwegian Air Shuttle planes.

"That voice! How can one describe it?" wrote opera critic Harold C. Schonberg in his New York Times obituary of Flagstad. "It was enormous, but did not sound enormous because it was never pushed or out of placement. It had a rather cool silvery quality, and was handled instrumentally, almost as though a huge violin was emitting legato phrases." Incredibly, Flagstad sang the role of Isolde 70 times on the Met stage from 1935 to 1941, making Tristan und Isolde one of the greatest box office attractions in Metropolitan Opera history. Nine of those performances were Saturday matinee radio broadcasts.

== Recordings ==
A comprehensive survey of her recordings was released in several volumes on the Simax label.

Her pre-war recordings include studio recordings of Wagner arias, Beethoven arias, and Grieg songs, as well as duets from Lohengrin, Parsifal, and Tristan und Isolde with Lauritz Melchior. These have been reissued on compact disc by RCA Victor, as well as on Naxos, Preiser and Romophone.

Many Metropolitan Opera broadcasts also survive and have circulated among collectors and more recently on CD. These include:

- Die Walküre, Act I and fragments from Act II from her 1935 début broadcast; 1937 (as Sieglinde); 1940.
- Tristan und Isolde, performances from 1935, 1937, and 1940 all readily available.
- Tannhäuser: 1936, with Melchior and Tibbett, 1939, and 1941 (the latter having an official release on Metropolitan Opera LPs).
- Siegfried: 1937, with Lauritz Melchior and Friedrich Schorr (available on Naxos and Guild labels).
- Lohengrin: 1937, with René Maison
- Fidelio: 1941 with Bruno Walter (available on Naxos)
- Alceste: 1952 (available on Walhall)

After World War II, many important studio recordings followed including:

- Wagner Scenes including the final duet from Siegfried (Testament CDs, licensed from EMI)
- Götterdämmerung: Final Scene, with Furtwängler - EMI
- Tristan und Isolde: Complete opera with Furtwängler - EMI
- Norwegian Songs: EMI
- Götterdämmerung: with Fjeldstad and Bjoner and Set Svanholm. 1956 - Urania and Walhall.
- Der Ring des Nibelungen: Gebhard. From Teatro alla Scala with Furtwängler, Lorenz, Svanholm, Frantz. 1950

Perhaps her most famous operatic recording is the 1952 Tristan with Furtwängler, which has never been out of print. It is available from EMI and Naxos, among others. Because she was aged 57, she was unsure of her capacity to reach the top Cs in Act II, and agreed to Elisabeth Schwarzkopf providing her voice for this purpose. Another two Tristans of note are two live performances: from London on 18 May and 2 June 1936, with Lauritz Melchior as Tristan, Emanuel List as Marke, Sabine Kalter as Brangäne, and Herbert Janssen as Kurwenal, conducted by Fritz Reiner leading the London Philharmonic Orchestra, and from the Teatro Colón (Buenos Aires) on 20 August 1948, with Set Svanholm as Tristan, Viorica Ursuleac as Brangäne, Hans Hotter as Kurwenal, and Ludwig Weber as Marke, conducted by Erich Kleiber.

Two live concerts are of particular historical significance:

- Four Last Songs (Richard Strauss, world premiere), with excerpts from Tristan und Isolde and Götterdämmerung, (Philharmonia Orchestra, cond. Wilhelm Furtwängler), London 22 May 1950. (Testament)
- Carnegie Hall American farewell concert (Symphony of the Air, cond. McArthur), 20 March 1955. (Includes Die Walküre Act I excerpts; Götterdämmerung final scene, Tristan Liebestod, and Wesendonck Lieder (orchestral version).) (World Records LP T-366-7.)
- Flagstad's celebrated 1951 appearance at the Mermaid Theatre, London in Purcell's Dido and Aeneas is represented by a cast recording in which the Mermaid Belinda (Maggie Teyte) was replaced by Elisabeth Schwarzkopf, but under the original direction of Geraint Jones. (His Master's Voice) ALP 1026, EMG review January 1953). A live performance with Teyte is available on the Walhall label.
- The Alceste (original Italian version edited by Geraint Jones) in which she also made a farewell was recorded with Raoul Jobin, Alexander Young, Marion Lowe, Thomas Hemsley, Joan Clark, Rosemary Thayer, Geraint Jones Orchestra and singers, Geraint Jones (Decca LP LXT 5273–5276). (Her part was recorded April 28, April 30, and May 1, 1956.)

In 1956, she moved to Decca where in the autumn of her career further important studio recordings followed:

- Several albums of Grieg, Sibelius, Brahms, etc., with orchestra and piano
- Hymns (traditional Norwegian language hymns)
- Wagner arias with Knappertsbusch (stereo)
- Acts I and III of Die Walküre (as Sieglinde and Brünnhilde, respectively) as well as the Brünnhilde/Siegmund duet from Act II (these conducted variously by Knappertsbusch and Solti, as a sort of preparation for Decca's complete Ring project).
- Her great valedictory as Fricka in the Decca Rheingold of 1958.

Almost to the end of her life, Flagstad continued to sing in fine voice, although she increasingly sang mezzo-soprano material or in a mezzo range: besides the Rheingold Fricka (a mezzo role), Decca planned to cast her also as the Walkure Fricka and the Gotterdammerung Waltraute for its complete Ring (in the event, both roles were sung by Christa Ludwig), and also to record her in Brahms' Four Serious Songs and Alto Rhapsody; that these plans were shelved only by her final illness and death stands as a testament to her superbly consistent vocal abilities, and to the respect and affection in which she was held to the end by record companies and the public.
