= Michael Flagstad =

Norwegian musician and conductor

Michael Flagstad (4 February 1869 – 1 December 1930) was a Norwegian musician and conductor from Hamar.

== Biography ==
Flagstad studied violin with Gudbrand Bøhn, and he was the conductor at the Central Theater from 1901 to 1909 and at the Norwegian Theater from 1912 to 1917. He was a founder and board member of the Norwegian Musicians' Union (Norsk Musikerforbund), which was established in 1911. He also translated numerous opera librettos into Norwegian.

Michael Flagstad was married to the pianist Maja Flagstad and was the father of the singer Kirsten Flagstad, conductor Ole Flagstad, pianist Lasse Flagstad, and singer Karen-Marie Flagstad. They moved from Hamar to Oslo, where they settled in Vinderen around 1900.
