= Opera Comique (Oslo) =

Norwegian opera company

Coordinates: 59°54′48.80″N 10°44′9.06″E

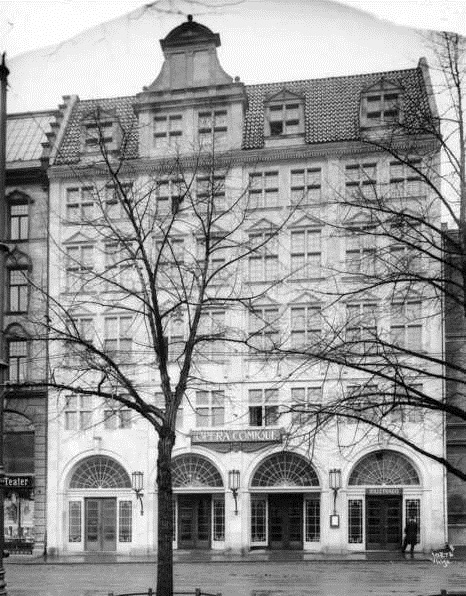
The Opera Comique in 1918

The Opera Comique was Norway's first permanent opera company. The company operated at Stortingsgata ('Parliament Street') no. 16 and existed from 1918 to 1921.

Its first major production was Tannhäuser with tenor Erling Krogh in the starring role. Altogether, the company staged 26 operas, including the Norwegian opera Bruderovet (The Kidnapped Bride) by Gerhard Schjelderup.

== Background ==
By 1918, entertainment venues were already operating on and just off of Stortingsgata. These included the Brødrene Hals concert hall at Stortingsgata 22–24 (established in 1880), the Tivoli entertainment center (Stortingsgata 20, 1890), the National Theater (Stortingsgata 15, 1899), the Theater Café (Stortingsgata 24, 1900), the Chat Noir cabaret (Klingenberggata 5, 1912), and cinemas: Kinematograf-Teatret (Stortingsgata 12, 1904), Bio-Kino (Stortingsgata 14, 1911), Kosmorama (Stortingsgata 4, 1910), and Boulevard (Stortingsgata 10).

== Building ==
Construction on the building at Stortingsgata 16 started in 1917 to create a business venue with a stage. After much discussion, it was decided that the venue would be used for an opera because there was no opera yet in Oslo. The building, designed by Henry Coll, was completed in 1918.

== Opera ==
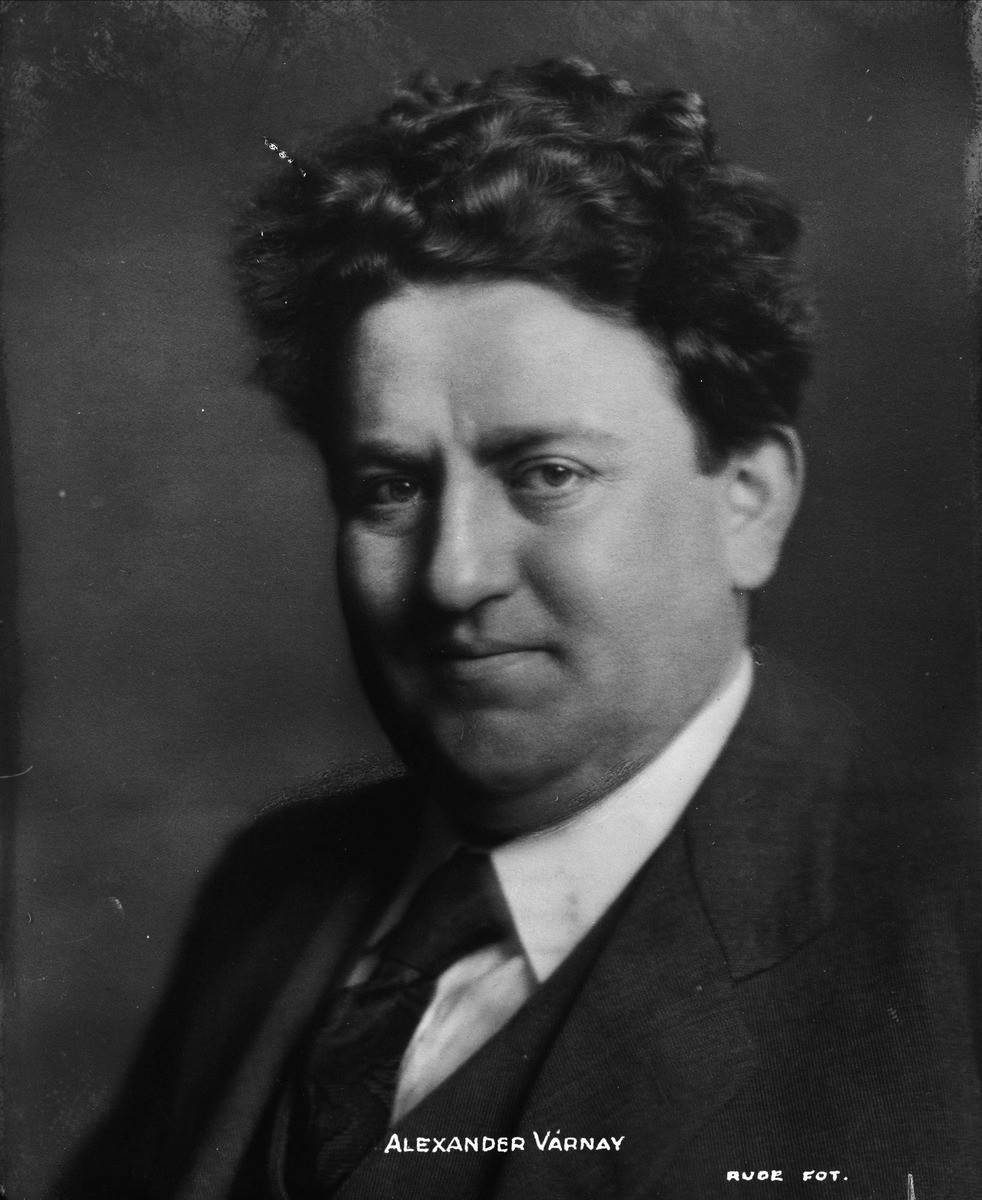
Alexander Varnay (1889–1924) was the opera's artistic director.

The opening performance at the opera took place on November 30, 1918. Benno Singer, the director at Tivoli, established and managed the opera after the decision was made on the venue's use. The establishment of a permanent opera in Oslo offered Norwegian opera singers an opportunity to develop in their home environment; among those that appeared at the Opera Comique was Kirsten Flagstad. During these three years, the Hungarian tenor Alexander Varnay (1889–1924), the father of Astrid Varnay, was the opera's artistic director. His wife, the coloratura soprano, Maria Yavor (1889–1976), also appeared at the opera.
