= Jan de Weryha-Wysoczański =

German sculptor

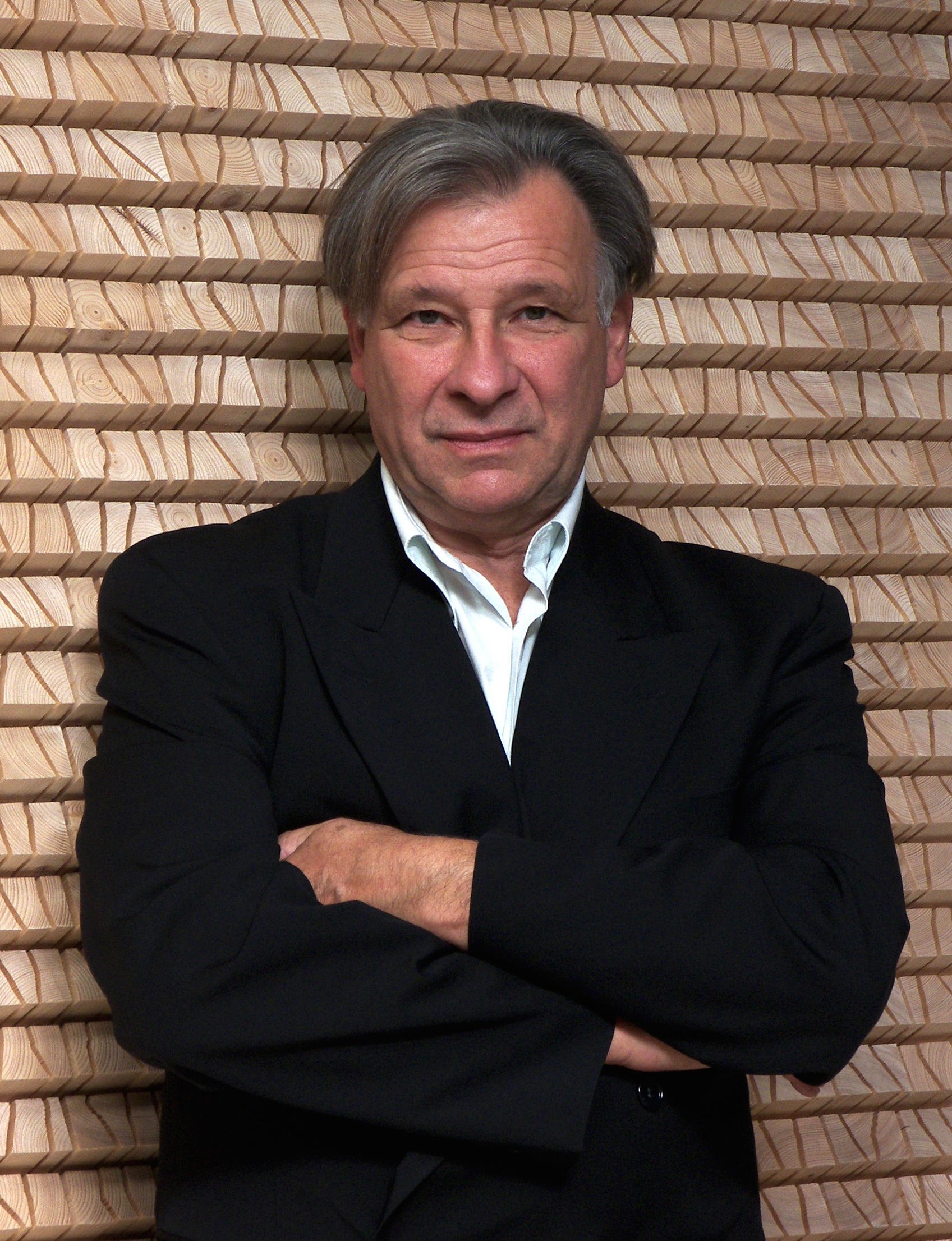
- De Weryha-Wysoczański in 2014
- Born: 1 October 1950 (age 75)
- Education: Academy of Fine Arts in Gdańsk
- Known for: Sculpture
- Awards: Prix du Jury, Salon de Printemps, Luxembourg (1998); Golden Owl, Vienna (2022); Special Recognition by the Jury, Osten Biennial, Skopje (2026)

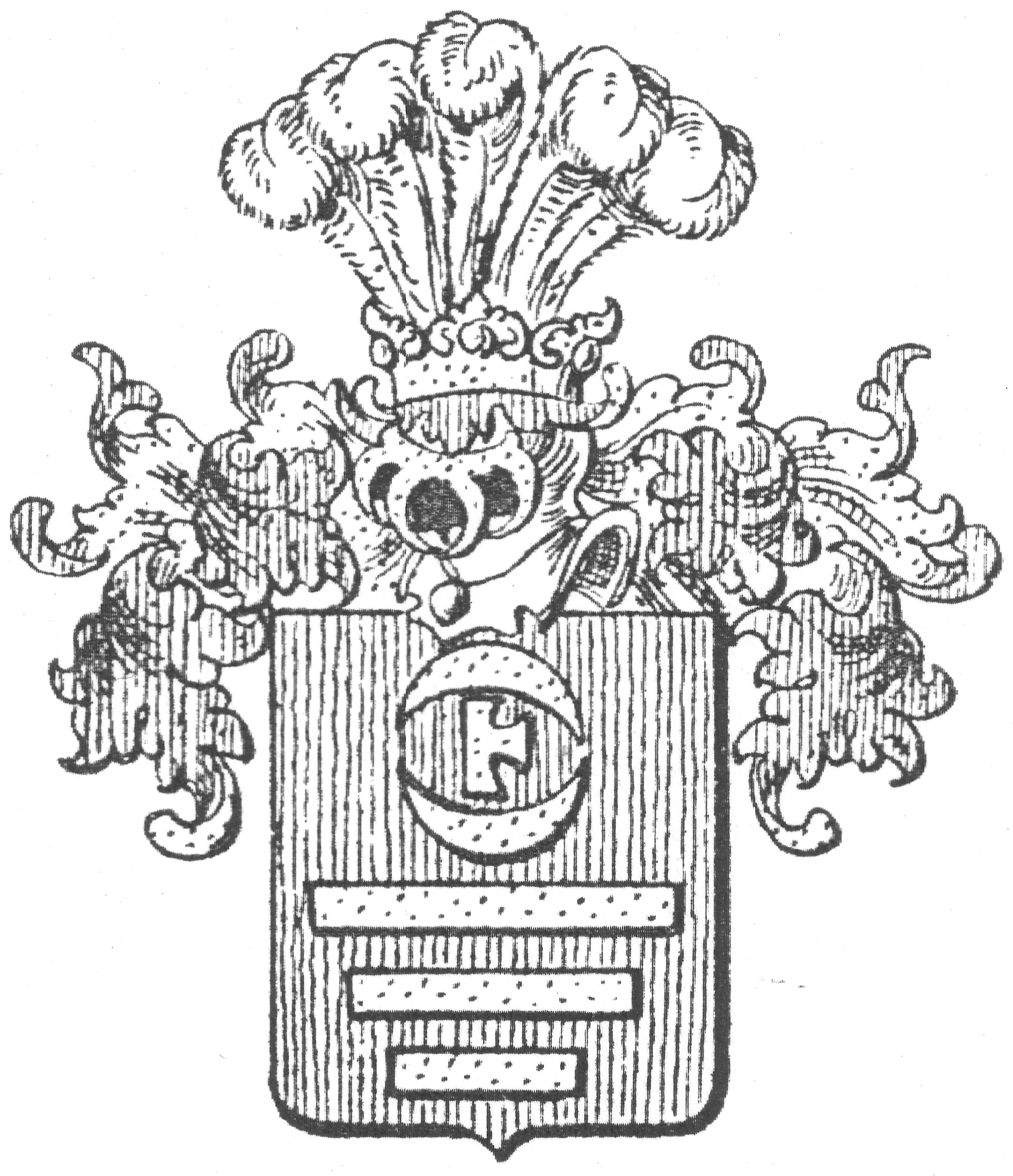
The Wukry coat of arms

Jan Michał, 6th Chevalier de Weryha-Wysoczański-Pietrusiewicz (born 1 October 1950), known as Jan de Weryha-Wysoczański, is a Polish sculptor, process artist and concrete artist. He was born in Gdańsk. From 1971 to 1976 he studied sculpture at the Academy of Fine Arts in Gdańsk. Since 1981, he has been living and working in Hamburg. In 1998, he won the 1st prize, the Prix du Jury, awarded by the Ministry of Culture of the Grand Duchy of Luxembourg at the 'Salon de Printemps 98', Luxembourg. In 1999, he created a monument in memory of the deportees of the 1944 Warsaw Uprising for the memorial to the victims of the Neuengamme Nazi concentration camp at Hamburg, in 2012 a memorial for the Nazi forced labourers in Hamburg-Bergedorf. He was represented by Galerie Kellermann in Düsseldorf. In 2022 de Weryha-Wysoczański was awarded in Vienna the Golden Owl culture award in the category Visual Arts. In 2026 he received a Special Recognition by the Jury at the Osten Biennial 2026, Skopje, North Macedonia.

He comes from an old noble family of Walachian boyar stock and legend has it that his coat of arms is borne by the descendants of Attila the Hun. His only son Rafael is a writer, his uncle Basil was a rich 19th century philanthropist. A son of his aunt Anna was composer Yaroslav Yaroslavenko. Another cousin was industrialist, novelist and playwright Bronislas, 3rd Chevalier de Minkowicz-Wysoczański.

== Works in museum collections ==
- Centre of Polish Sculpture, Orońsko, Poland
- National Museum, Szczecin, Poland
- Museum of Contemporary Art, Radom, Poland

== Sammlung de Weryha ==
Hamburg is the location of the "Sammlung de Weryha", which is based in the former depository of the palace museum Hamburg-Bergedorf. Most of the collection, composed of works by the artist and supported by a Friends organisation, is permanently being on display in the exhibition rooms.

== Exhibitions (selection) ==
- 1978 60th Anniversary of the Greater Poland Uprising in Art, City Gallery BWA Arsenał, Poznań
- 1989 Autumn Salon, Kunsthaus Hamburg, Hamburg
- 1990 Germany in Montana, Gallery of Visual Arts, Missoula, Montana
- 1993 Selected Art Work from the Federal Republic of Germany and The United States: A Traveling Exhibition, Paris Gibson Square Museum of Art, Great Falls, Montana
- 1998 Spring Salon '98, Luxembourg Artist Center, Municipal Theater, Luxembourg
- 2004 Strictly Wood. Heiner Szamida, Helga Weihs, Jan de Weryha, Kunsthalle Wilhelmshaven, Wilhelmshaven
- 2004 Jan de Weryha-Wysoczański – Wooden Cube from the Wooden Cube Series, Chapel Gallery, Polish Sculpture Center, Orońsko
- 2005 Jan de Weryha-Wysoczański – Epiphanies of Nature in the Late-Modern World, Szyb Wilson Gallery, Katowice
- 2005 Jan de Weryha-Wysoczański – Wood – Archive, Patio Gallery, Łódź
- 2006 Jan de Weryha-Wysoczański – Revelations in Wood – Orońsko 2006, Museum of Contemporary Sculpture, Orońsko
- 2006 XV International Sculpture Triennial – Sensitivity, "Zamek" Culture Center, Poznań
- 2006 Jan de Weryha-Wysoczański – Revelations in Wood, City Gallery BWA, Jelenia Góra
- 2008 Alphabet of the Sculpture DEF..., Museum of Contemporary Sculpture, Orońsko
- 2009 Jan de Weryha-Wysoczański – Tabularium, Gdańsk City Gallery, Gdańsk
- 2009 XVI International Sculpture Triennial – Crisis of the Genre, "Zamek" Culture Center, Poznań
- 2010 Wood as Sculpture Material, Museum of Contemporary Sculpture, Orońsko
- 2011 Hamburg Art Week 2011, Chilehaus, Hamburg
- 2013 NordArt 2013, Carlshütte, Büdelsdorf
- 2013 PROJECT BERLIN RELOAD, FACTORY-ART GALLERY, Berlin
- 2015 Alphabet of the Sculpture VWZŹ..., Museum of Contemporary Sculpture, Orońsko
- 2015 Mailights 2015: Günther Uecker, Otto Piene, Heinz Mack, Jan de Weryha, Manfred Binzer, Galerie Kellermann, Düsseldorf
- 2018 Wood Sculpture in the Work of Polish Artists 1918-2018, Władysław Count Zamoyski City Gallery in Zakopane, among others from the collections of the Zachęta National Gallery of Art, Warsaw, and the State Art Gallery, Sopot
- 2021 Kunst Schaffen, Robbe & Berking Yachting Heritage Centre, Flensburg, with Klaus Fußmann, Ingo Kühl among others.

== Gallery ==
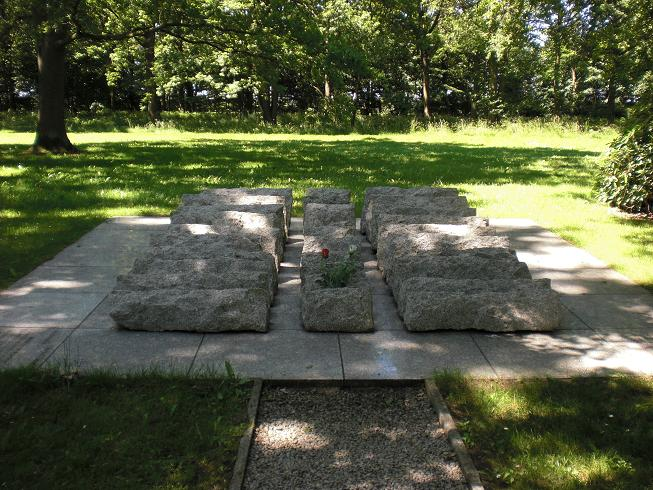
Warsaw Uprising Memorial in Hamburg, 1999

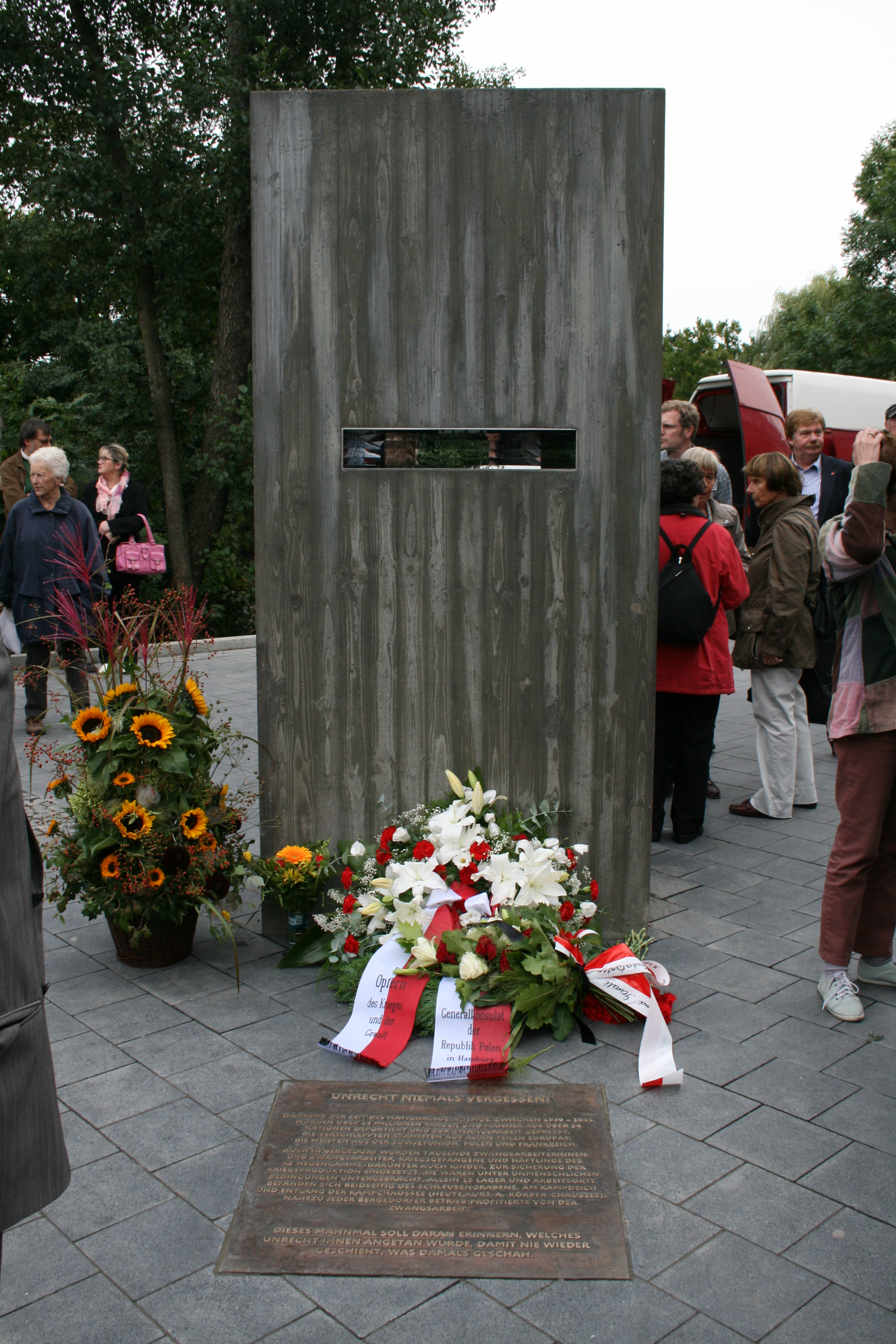
Memorial for the Nazi forced labourers in Hamburg-Bergedorf, 2012

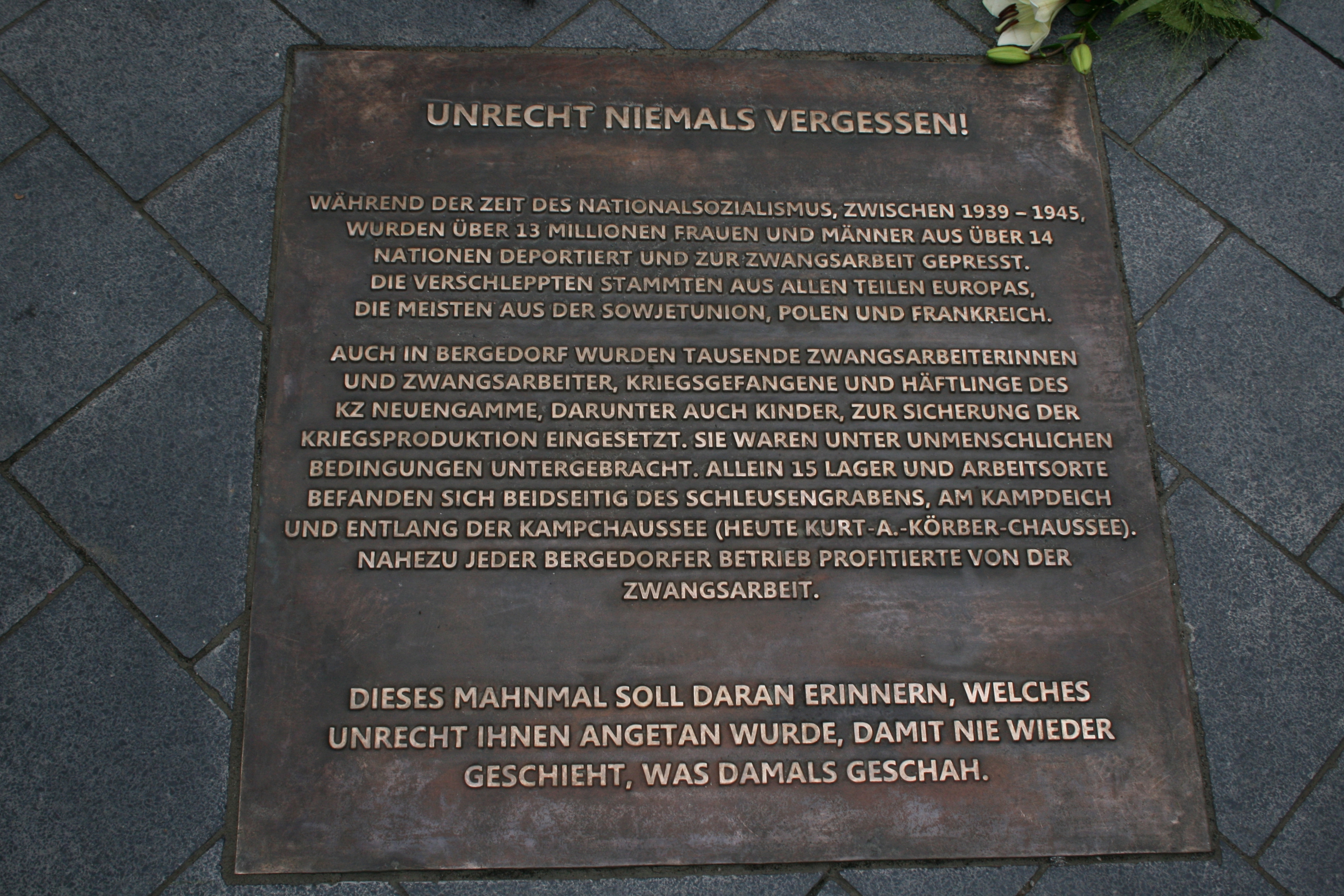
Memorial for the Nazi forced labourers (detail) in Hamburg-Bergedorf, 2012

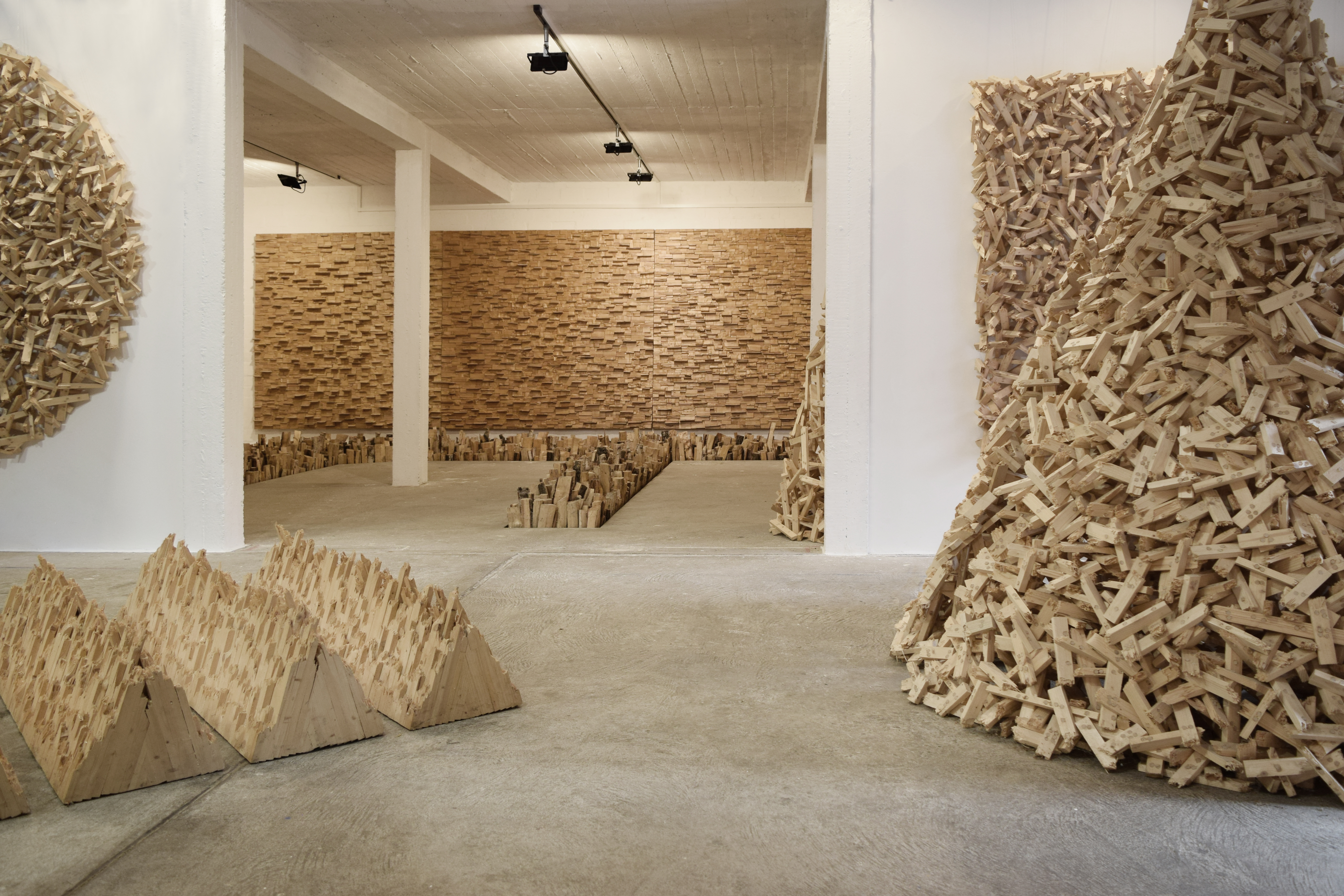
Sammlung de Weryha in Hamburg housing a permanent exhibition of the works of the artist

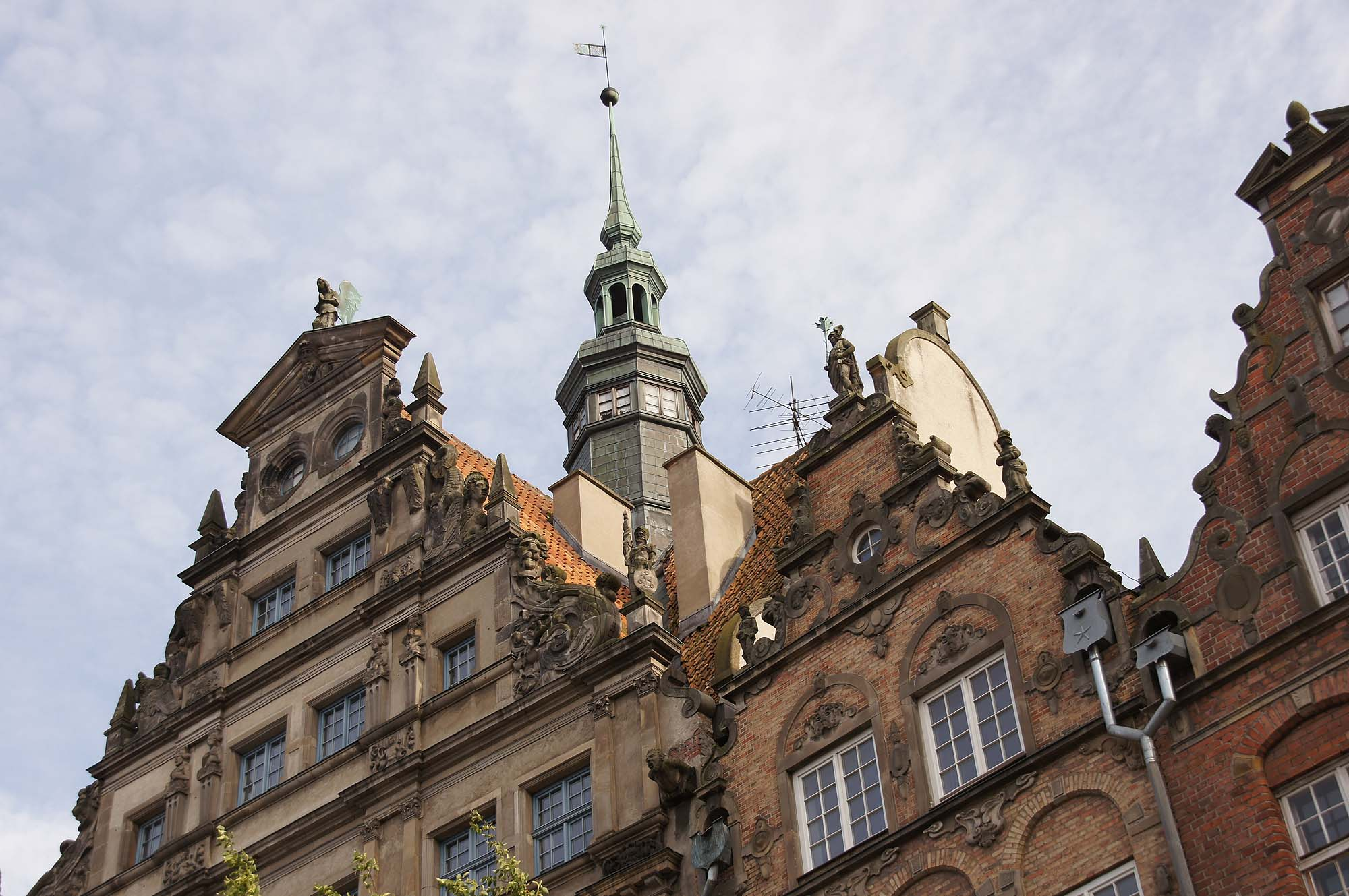
A sculpture on the façade of the English House (left) in Gdańsk was reconstructed by the artist at the beginning of the 1980s

== Bibliography ==
- Axel Feuß: Weryha-Wysoczański, Jan de, in: Allgemeines Künstlerlexikon. Die Bildenden Künstler aller Zeiten und Völker (AKL), vol. 116, Berlin, Boston: de Gruyter 2022, pp. 2-3, ISBN 978-31-1077-593-8, OCLC 464627280.
- Rafael de Weryha-Wysoczański (ed.): Jan de Weryha: The Monograph, Toruń, Hamburg: Oficyna Wydawnicza Kucharski, Freundeskreis Sammlung de Weryha e.V. 2026, ISBN 978-83-64232-77-0, OCLC 1578093248.
