= March of Ukrainian Nationalists =

Ukrainian patriotic song

Зродились ми великої години
English: We were born in a great hour
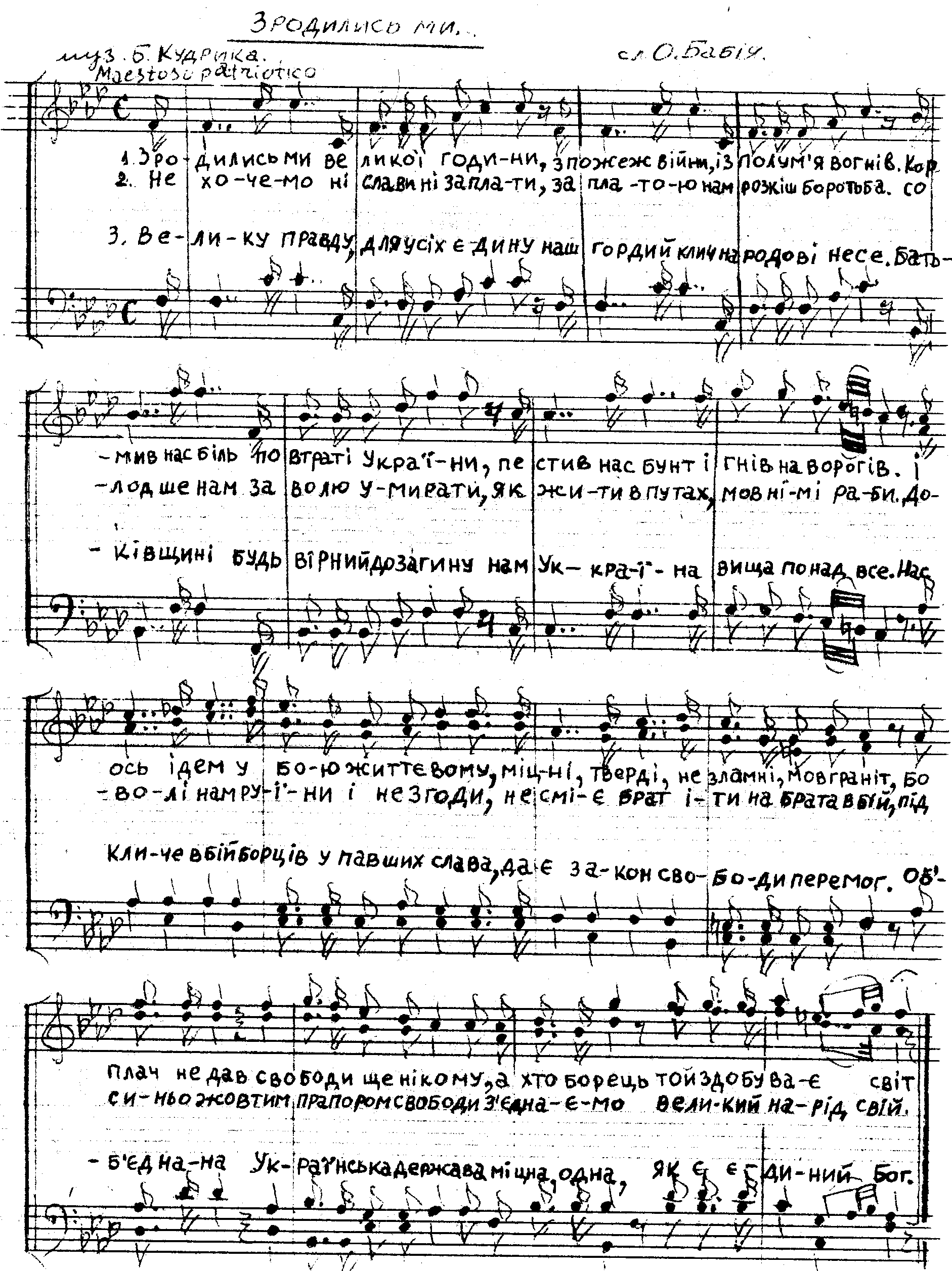
- The original sheet music of the anthem
- Anthem of the Organisation of Ukrainian Nationalists
- Lyrics: Oles Babiy, 1929
- Music: Omelian Nyzhankivskyi, 1929
- Adopted: 1932

Audio sample
- file; help

The March of Ukrainian Nationalists is a Ukrainian patriotic song that was the official anthem of the Organisation of Ukrainian Nationalists and the Ukrainian Insurgent Army. The song is also known by its first line "We were born in a great hour" (Ukrainian: «Зродились ми з великої години», romanized: Zrodylys my z velykoyi hodyny). The song, written by Oles Babiy to music by Omelian Nyzhankivskyi in 1929, was officially adopted by the leadership of the Organisation of Ukrainian Nationalists in 1932. The song is often referred to as a patriotic song from the times of the uprising, and a Ukrainian folk song.

It is still commonly performed today, especially at events honoring the Ukrainian Insurgent Army and by nationalist organisations and party meetings, such as those of VO Svoboda.

== Background ==
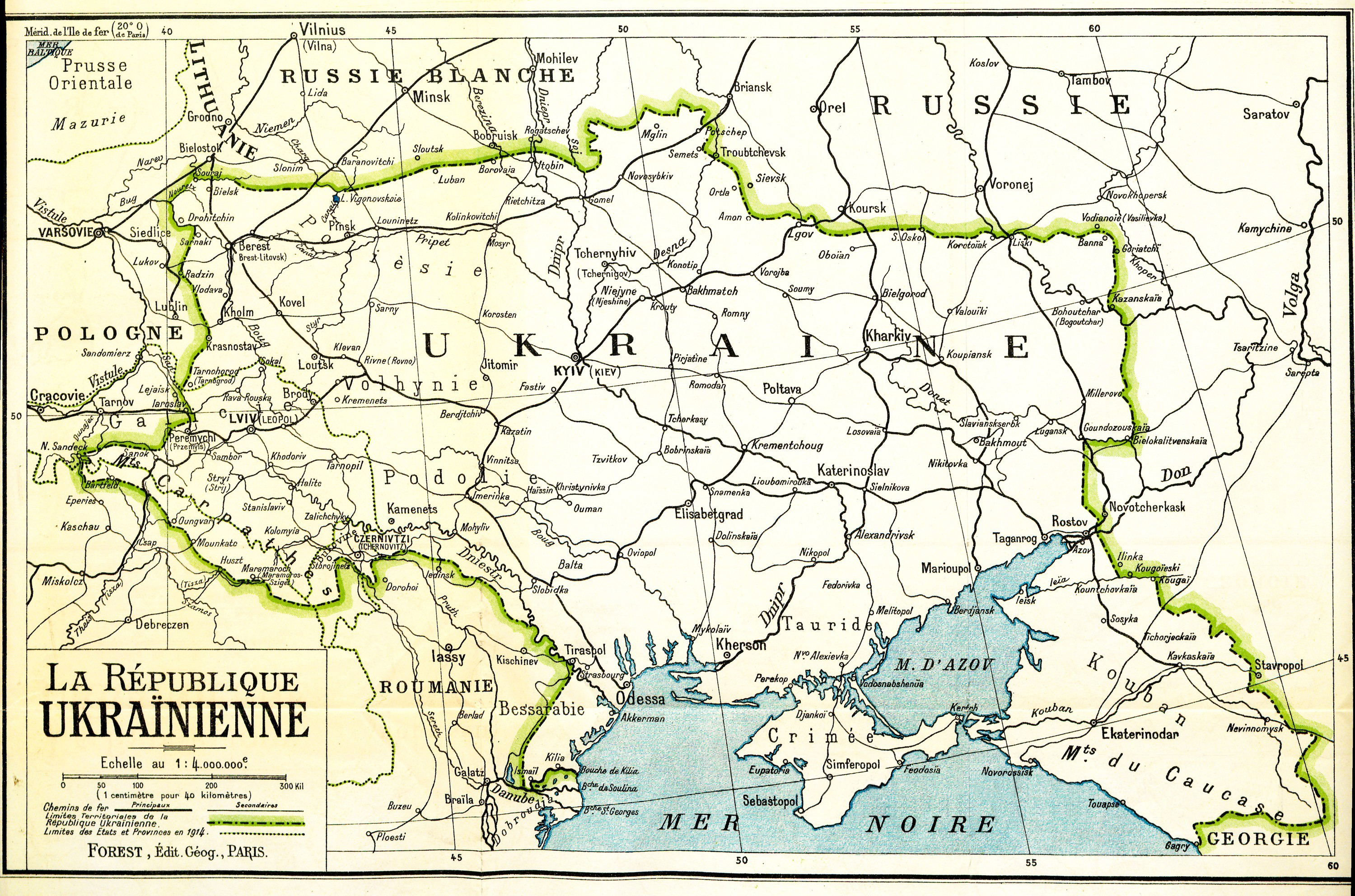
Proposed borders of the short-lived Ukrainian People's Republic as it appeared in 1919, stretching from the San river in present-day Poland to the Kuban region next to the Caucasus Mountains in present-day Southern Russia (as referenced in the song).

In 1919, with the end of the Polish–Ukrainian War, which resulted in the takeover of western Ukraine by the Second Polish Republic, many former leaders of the Ukrainian republic were exiled. As Polish persecution of Ukrainians during the interwar period increased, many Ukrainians (particularly the youth, many of whom felt they had no future) lost faith in traditional legal approaches, in their elders, and in the western democracies who were seen as turning their backs on Ukraine. This period of disillusionment coincided with the increase in support for the Organisation of Ukrainian Nationalists (OUN). By the beginning of the Second World War, the OUN was estimated to have 20,000 active members and many times that number in sympathizers. The song was written in 1929 during the midst of these political events and adopted by the organisation's leadership 3 years later.

The March of the Ukrainian Nationalists is written and performed as a military march and a call to arms. The first verse of the song refers to "the pain of losing Ukraine", referring to the short-lived independence of the Ukrainian People's Republic from 1917-1921. The republic was divided up among the Soviet Union and the Second Polish Republic. The song also mentions a popular Ukrainian national motto, "A United Ukrainian state... from the San to the Caucasus". This is in line with the Ukrainian irredentist concept of having Ukraine's western border start at the San river in modern-day in western Ukraine and southeastern Poland and its eastern border at the Caucasus Mountains in modern-day southern Russia.

== Lyrics ==
Ukrainian lyrics

Зродились ми великої години,
З пожеж війни, із полум'я вогнів,
Плекав нас біль по втраті України,
Кормив нас гнів і злість на ворогів.

І ми йдемо в бою життєвому,
Тверді, міцні, незламні мов граніт,
Бо плач не дав свободи ще нікому,
А хто борець — той здобуває світ.

Не хочемо ні слави ні заплати.
Заплатa нам це радість в боротьбі!
Солодше нам у бою умирати,
як жити в путах, мов німі раби.

Доволі нам руїни і незгоди,
Не сміє брат на брата йти у бій!
Під синьо-жовтим прапором свободи
З'єднаєм весь великий нарід свій.

Велику правду — для усіх єдину,
Наш гордий клич народові несе!
Вітчизні ти будь вірний до загину,
Нам Україна вище понад все!

Веде нас в бій борців упавших слава.
Для нас закон найвищий — то наказ:
"Соборна Українськая держава —
Вільна й міцна, від Сяну по Кавказ".

Ukrainian romanized lyrics (Latynka)

Zrodylyś my velykoi hodyny,
Z požež vijny, iz polumja vohniv,
Plekav nas biľ po vtrati Ukrainy,
Kormyv nas hniv i zlisť na vorohiv.

I my jdemo v boju žyttievomu,
Tverdi, micni, nezlamni mov hranit,
Bo plač ne dav svobody šče nikomu,
A chto boreć — toj zdobuvaje svit.

Ne chočemo ni slavy ni zaplaty.
Zaplata nam ce radisť v boroťbi!
Solodše nam u boju umyraty,
jak žyty v putach, mov nimi raby.

Dovoli nam ruiny i nezhody,
Ne smije brat na brata jty u bij!
Pid synio-žovtym praporom svobody
Zjednajem veś velykyj narid svij.

Velyku pravdu — dlia usich jedynu,
Naš hordyj klyč narodovi nese!
Vitčyzni ty buď virnyj do zahynu,
Nam Ukraina vyšče ponad vse!

Vede nas v bij borciv upavšych slava.
Dlia nas zakon najvyščyj — to nakaz:
„Soborna Ukrainśkaja deržava —
Viľna j micna, vid Sianu po Kavkaz“.

English translation

We were born in a great hour,
From the fires of war, and the flames of gunshots,
We were nurtured by the pain of losing Ukraine,
We were fed by anger and malice to our enemies.

And here we walk in the battle of life—
Solid, durable, unbreakable, like granite,
For crying hasn't given freedom to anyone yet,
But whoever is a fighter, he conquers the world.

We want neither glory, nor payment.
Payment for us is the luxury of fighting!
It is sweeter for us to die in battle,
Than to live in bondage, as mute slaves.

Enough of ruins and disagreements for us,
A brother will not dare to go to war against a brother!
Under the blue-yellow flag of freedom
We will unite all of our great people.

A united nation one for us all is that one truth
This is our proud call to all people:
Be faithful to your homeland until death,
For us, Ukraine is above all else!

The glory of fallen fighters leads us into battle,
The law is the highest order we shall fulfil:
"Towards a free and united Ukrainian nation,
Free and strong, from the San to the Caucasus"!

== Modern song ==
External videos
- March of the New Army
- YouTube

The March of the New Army (Ukrainian: Марш нової армії) is a modernized adaptation of the song that is used as a Ukrainian military march as well as a patriotic song with nationalist overtones. A modern text was adopted in 2017 at the initiative of Oleh Skrypka, lead singer of the Ukrainian rock band Vopli Vidopliassova. The new text honors the soldiers of the Armed Forces of Ukraine who fought and died in the Anti-Terrorist Operation Zone during the War in Donbas. According to Skrypka, the text was conceived while at the front visiting a volunteer unit.

The new march was presented for the first time in early 2017 on the eve of the Ukrainian Volunteer Day, and was performed by Skrypka in cooperation with the Song and Dance Ensemble of the Armed Forces of Ukraine. On August 24, 2018, the modern version of the song was performed the first time at the Kyiv Independence Day Parade dedicated to the 27th anniversary of independence and the 100th anniversary of the UPR. In his opening address at the parade, President Petro Poroshenko sang an excerpt of the song, describing it as one that "symbolizes the inextricable bond between different generations of fighters for freedom of the homeland."

In the version of the song recorded and released in 2026 by the 3rd Assault Brigade, the words “from the San to the Caucasus” are replaced with “from the Tisza to the Caucasus” (the Tisza forms part of Ukraine’s border in the area of the city of Chop, the westernmost point of the country).

=== Modified lyrics as performed by Vopli Vidopliassova ===
Ukrainian lyrics

Зродились ми великої години,
З пожеж війни і полум'я вогнів.
Плекав нас біль за долю України,
Зростив нас гнів і лють на ворогів.

Ми йдемо в бій переможним ходом,
Тверді й міцні, незламні мов граніт,
Бо плач не дав нікому ще свободи,
Хто борець, той здобуває світ.

Велику суть для усіх єдину,
Наш гордий клич народові несе
Вітчизні будь ти вірний без упину
Нам Україна вище понад все!

Веде нас в бій героїв наших слава.
Для нас закон найвищий то наказ:
«Соборна Українська є держава —
Одна навік: від Сяну по Кавказ!»

Ukrainian romanized lyrics (Latynka)

Zrodylyś my velykoi hodyny,
Z požež vijny i polumja vohniv.
Plekav nas biľ za doliu Ukrainy,
Zrostyv nas hniv i liuť na vorohiv.

My jdemo v bij peremožnym chodom,
Tverdi j mücni, nezlamni mov hranit,
Bo plač ne dav nikomu šče svobody,
Chto boreć, toj zdobuvaje svit.

Velyku suť dlia usich jedynu,
Naš hordyj klyč narodovi nese
Vitčyzni buď ty virnyj bez upynu
Nam Ukraina vyšče ponad vse!

Vede nas v bij heroiv našych slava.
Dlia nas zakon najvyščyj to nakaz:
„Soborna Ukrainśka je deržava —
Odna navik: vid Sianu po Kavkaz!“

English translation

We were born in a great hour,
From the fires of war, and the flames of fire,
We were nurtured for the fate of Ukraine,
We arose with anger and rage against enemies.

We go into battle with a triumphant march,
Solid, strong, unbreakable, like granite,
For crying hasn't given freedom to anyone yet,
Whoever is a fighter, thus gains the world.

The great essence for all is uniform,
Our proud call to the people now resounds:
"Be faithful without cease to the Fatherland,
For us, Ukraine is above all else"!

Let the glory of our heroes lead us to battle,
And may this highest order we shall fulfil:
"Towards the independent Ukrainian nation,
Stronger forever, from the San up to the Caucasus!"

=== Alternative lyrics ===
When this song was used at the 2018 Independence Day parade, slightly different lyrics were used.

Ukrainian lyrics

Зродились ми великої години,
З пожеж війни і полум’я вогнів.
Плекав нас біль за долю України,
Зростив нас гнів і лють на ворогів.

Ми йдемо в бій переможним ходом,
Тверді й міцні, незламні мов граніт,
Бо плач не дав нікому ще свободи,
А хто борець, той здобуває світ.

Велику правду для усіх єдину,
Наш гордий клич народові несе
Вітчизні будь ти вірний до загину
Нам Україна вище понад все!

Веде нас в бій героїв наших слава.
Для нас закон найвищий то наказ:
«Соборна Українська є держава —
Одна навік: вона в серцях у нас!»

Ukrainian romanized lyrics (Latynka)

Zrodylyś my velykoi hodyny,
Z požež vijny i polumja vohniv.
Plekav nas biľ za doliu Ukrainy,
Zrostyv nas hniv i liuť na vorohiv.

My jdemo v bij peremožnym chodom,
Tverdi j micni, nezlamni mov hranit,
Bo plač ne dav nikomu šče svobody,
A chto boreć, toj zdobuvaje svit.

Velyku pravdu dlia usich jedynu,
Naš hordyj klyč narodovi nese
Vitčyzni buď ty virnyj do zahynu
Nam Ukraina vyšče ponad vse!

Vede nas v bij heroiv našych slava.
Dlia nas zakon najvyščyj to nakaz:
„Soborna Ukrainśka je deržava —
Odna navik: vona v serciach u nas!“

English translation

We were born in the great hour,
From the fires of war, and the flames of fire,
We were nurtured for the fate of Ukraine,
We arose with anger and rage against enemies.

We go into battle with a triumphant march,
Solid, strong, unbreakable, like granite,
For crying hasn't given freedom to anyone yet,
But whoever is a fighter, he gains the world.

The great truth for all is uniform,
Our proud call to the people brings:
"Be faithful to your Fatherland unto death,
For us, Ukraine is above all else"!

Glory of our heroes leads us to battle,
And this highest order may we shall fulfil:
"For an independent Ukrainian nation,
United forever, it is in our hearts!"

== See also ==
- "Oh, the Red Viburnum in the Meadow"
- "Prayer for Ukraine"
- State Anthem of Ukraine
- „Za Ukrainu“
