= Wysoczański =

Polish noble family

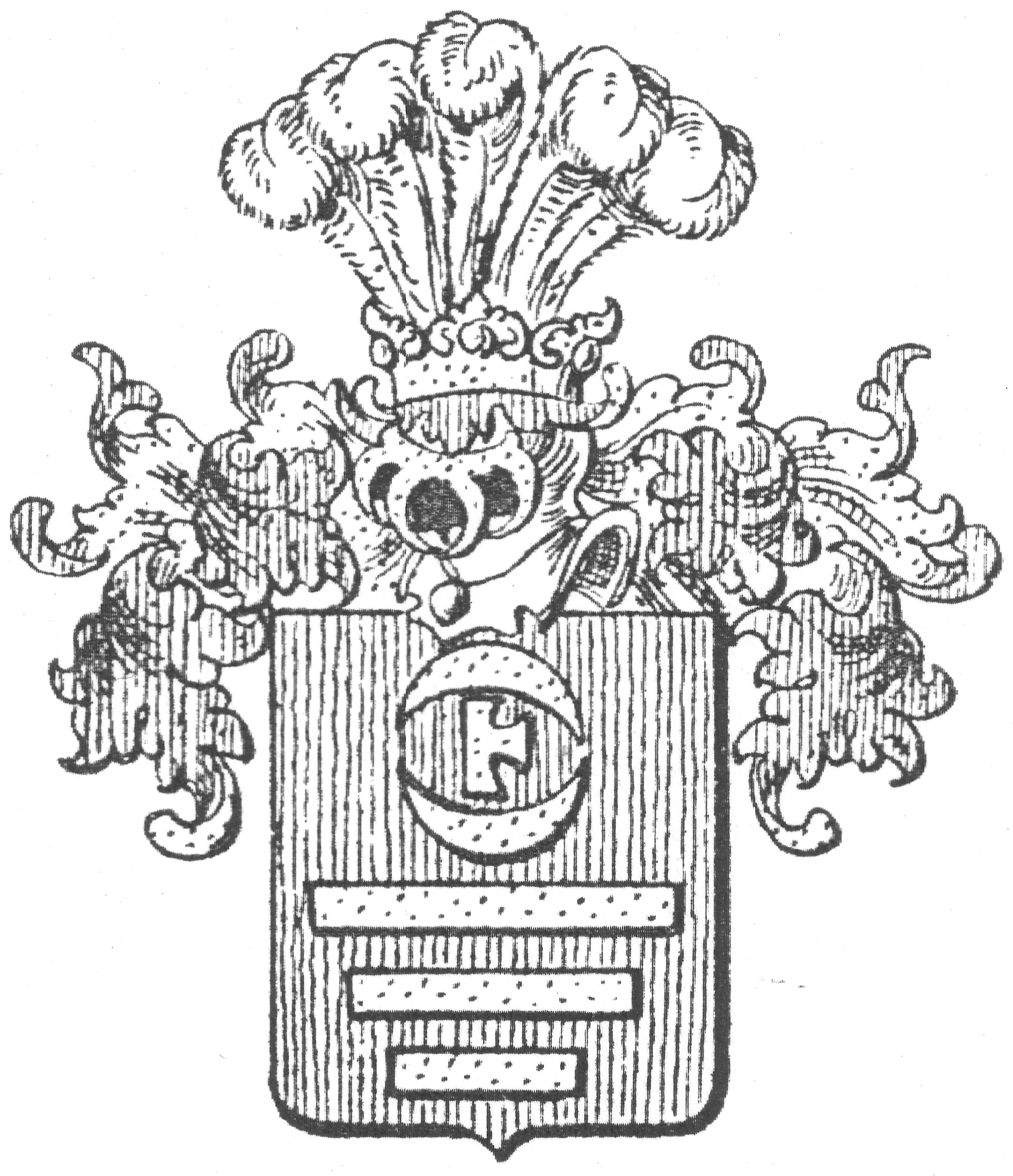
The family coat of arms, "Wukry", in the version of 1784, 1876 and 1889

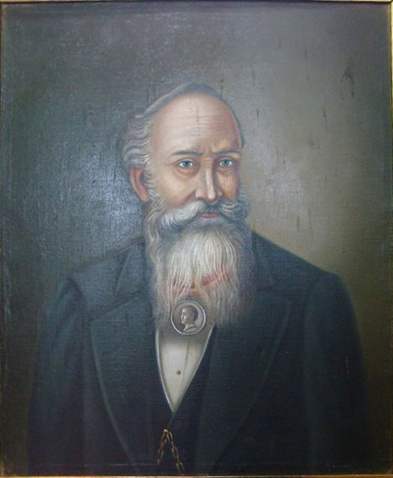
Basil, 1st Chevalier de Weryha-Wysoczański-Pietrusiewicz

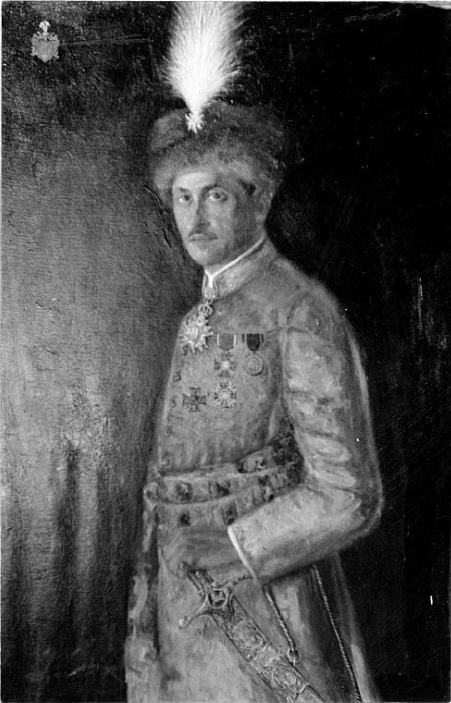
Bronislas, 3rd Chevalier de Minkowicz-Wysoczański, Ph.D.

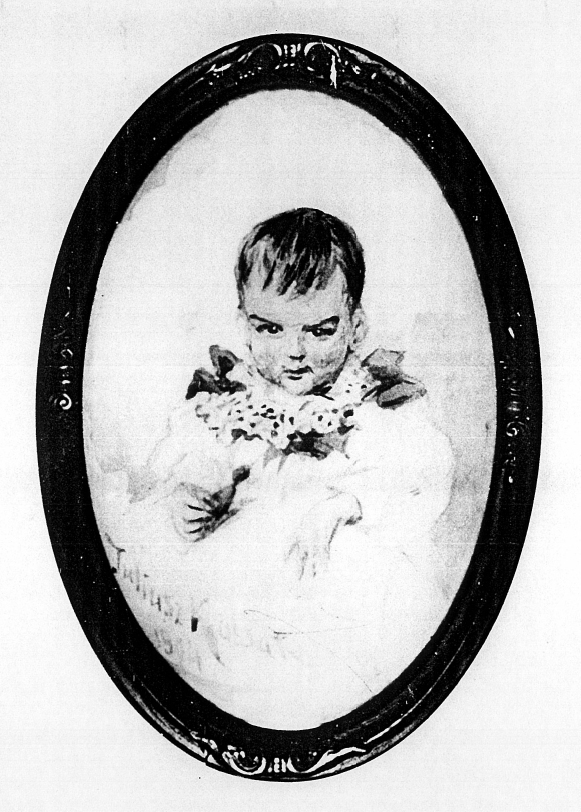
Madame Bronislas de Minkowicz-Wysoczańska, née Romaszkan by Juliusz Kossak

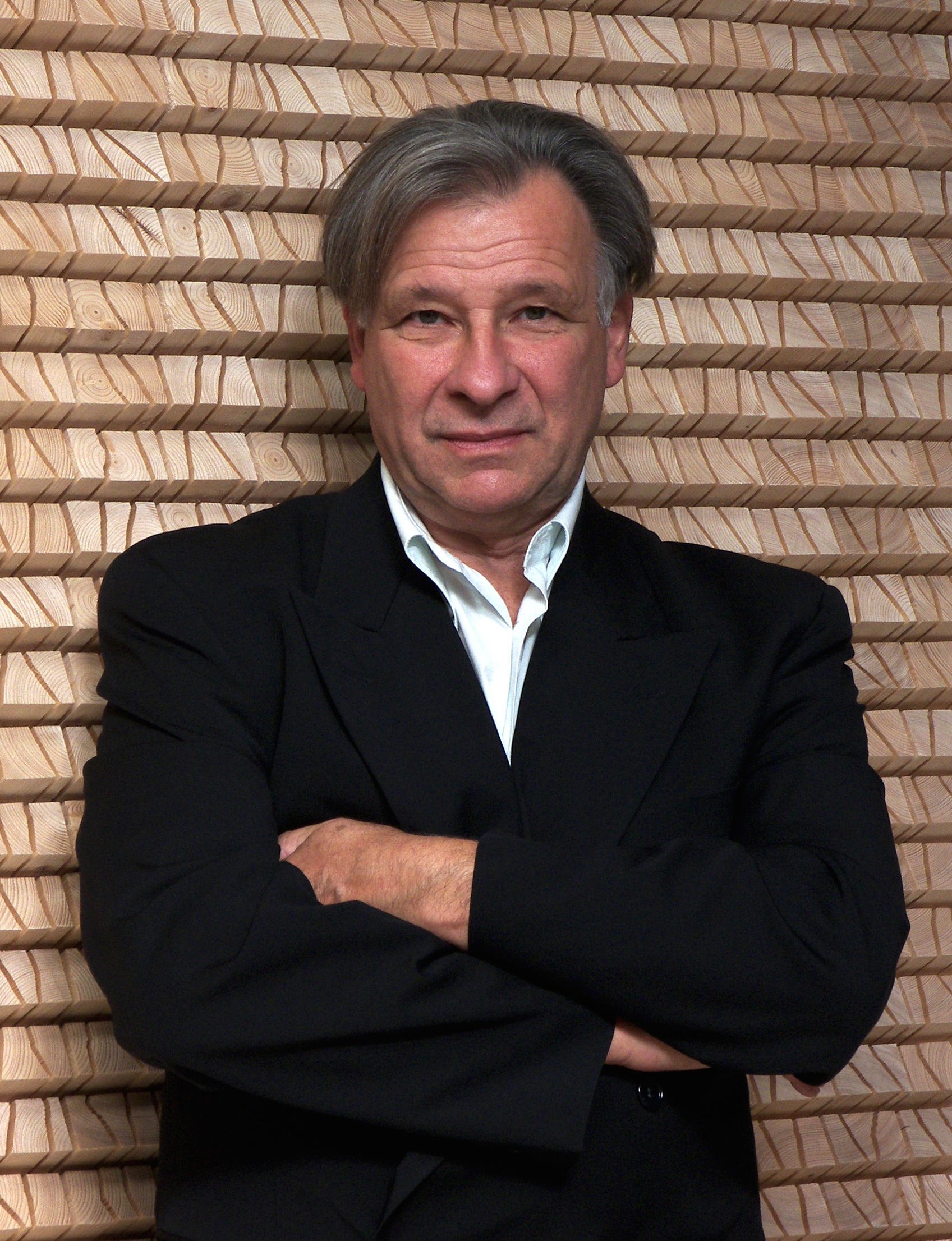
Jan, 6th Chevalier de Weryha-Wysoczański-Pietrusiewicz

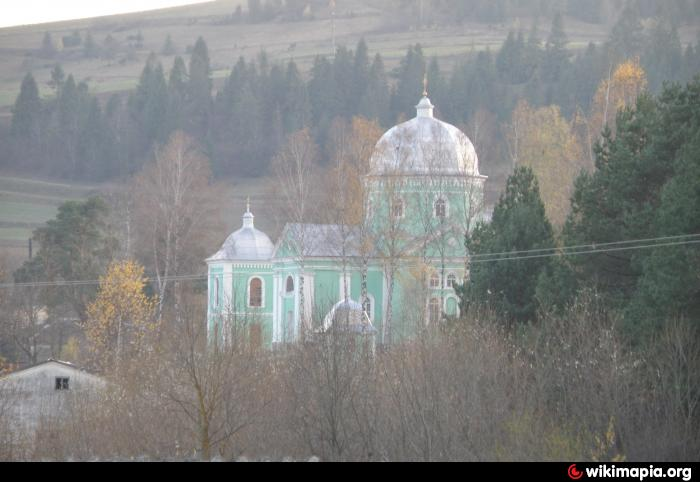
St. Nicholas Church in Wysocko Wyżne donated by Basil, 1st Chevalier de Weryha-Wysoczański-Pietrusiewicz, built by Jan Lewiński

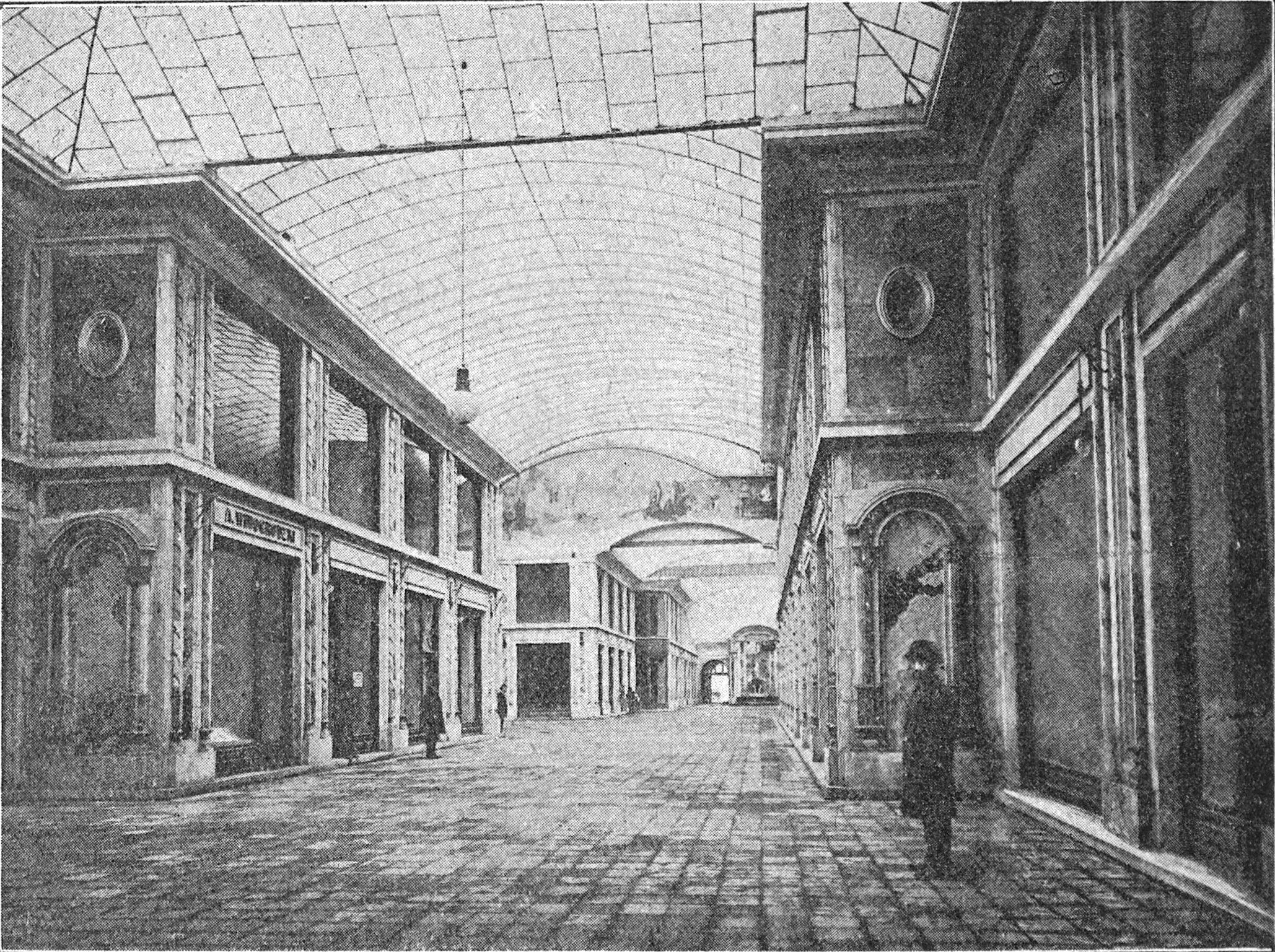
Mikolasch Arcade mentioned in the memoirs of Janina Kościałkowska as the dowry of Hedwig de Minkowicz-Wysoczańska

Wysoczański plural: Wysoczańscy (with by-names such as “de Weryha”, “Minkowicz” or “Pietrusiewicz”) is the surname of a Polish szlachta (nobility) family, which traces its lineage back to Comes Vane Valachus who was granted land in 1431 by Polish King Ladislaus II. Jagiełło. Hereditary Chevaliers of Galicia (“Ritter”) since 1782.

== Notable family members ==
- Albin Kazimierz Weryha-Wysoczański-Pietrusiewicz, 1st Hereditary Chevalier of Galicia 1782, landowner, Member of the Galician Parliament
- Basil Weryha-Wysoczański-Pietrusiewicz (1816-1891), 1st Hereditary Chevalier of Galicia, wholesale merchant, landowner, town property owner and philanthropist in Odessa about whom a biography was published in 1892 and a novel in 1930
- Wilhelmine Weryha-Wysoczańska-Pietrusiewicz, only child of Basil, 1st Chevalier de Weryha-Wysoczański-Pietrusiewicz, heir presumptive to her father's fortune, died prematurely at age 19 in Cannes in 1884, married to a Swiss rentier
- Bronisław Eugeniusz de Minkowicz Wysoczański (1881-1955), 3rd and last Hereditary Chevalier of Galicia, Ph.D., novelist, industrialist, Honorary Consul of the Yugoslavian Kingdom, Commander of the Order of Saint Sava
- Jakub Weryha-Wysoczański-Pietrusiewicz (born 1974), Hereditary Chevalier of Galicia, Executive Board Member of Gemius S.A., President of the Board of Gemius Polska
- Barbara Weryha-Wysoczańska-Pietrusiewicz (born 1949), Madame, Olympic Bronze Medallist and Vice World Champion in fencing, wife of Chevalier Ryszard Weryha-Wysoczański-Pietrusiewicz, Ph.D.
- Jan de Weryha-Wysoczański-Pietrusiewicz (born 1950), 6th Hereditary Chevalier of Galicia, artist
- Rafael de Weryha-Wysoczański-Pietrusiewicz (born 1975), Hereditary Chevalier of Galicia, Ph.D., writer, art historian

== In popular culture ==
=== Geography ===
- In Sokal, a town in the Austro-Hungarian Empire, “one of the prettiest streets” was named after Eugenius, 1st Chevalier de Minkowicz Wysoczański.

=== Literature ===
- In Ivan Fylypchak's biographical novel Willpower (Lwów 1930; second edition Sambor 1999) the book depicts the life of Basil, 1st Chevalier de Weryha-Wysoczański-Pietrusiewicz who is going by his real name in the book, although some facts were changed for dramatic reasons.
- In Józef Dunin Karwicki's Memoirs of a Volyn Man (Lwów 1897) the author makes mention of Basil, 1st Chevalier de Weryha-Wysoczański-Pietrusiewicz.
- In Janina Kościałkowska's memoir Beech Boat (Columbia 1993) the author mentions Hedwig de Minkowicz-Wysoczańska as the girl with "the whole Mikolasch Arcade in her dowry". Hedwig was the daughter of Bronislas, 3rd and last Chevalier, she married Stanislas Longchamps de Bérier. The Mikolasch Arcade was Lwów's most famous shopping arcade with a length of 120 metres and a glass roof of some 18 metres width.
- In Konstantin Paustovsky's six part autobiographical novel cycle Story of a Life the first part Distant Years (London 1964) is to a big part made up of the description of his Wysoczański relatives, as for example the three brothers of his mother who, according to Paustovsky, all attended the Kyiv Cadet Corps and were all inscribed into the Kyiv Register of the Nobility. Out of these Alexey was a tsarist Colonel and "Uncle Kolja" was a Major General who was murdered by the Soviets in 1929. The book includes a description of a ball in a country house as well as going fishing with Uncle Kolja in the dramatic Russian country side.
- In Chevalier Rafael de Weryha-Wysoczański's memoirs A Chevalier from Poland (Kibworth Beauchamp 2016) the first chapter of the book recalls the history and notable members of the family.
- In Demeter Więckowski's biography (Lwów 1892) the author describes the life of Basil, 1st Chevalier de Weryha-Wysoczański-Pietrusiewicz and the erection of the church he donated to his village of birth. The writer and poet Demeter Więckowski was married to Anna de Weryha-Wysoczańska-Pietrusiewicz, a niece of Basil, 1st Chevalier. Their son was Yaroslav Yaroslavenko, the composer, for whom Basil, 1st Chevalier, stood sponsor.

== Sources ==
- Almanach. Polska towarzyska 1926 La Pologne mondaine (Warsaw 1926), Wyr-Wysz.
- Czy wiesz kto to jest? (Warsaw 1938), Uzupełnienia i sprostowania, p. 200, pp. 352-353.
- Chevalier Rafael de Weryha-Wysoczanski, A Chevalier from Poland. The Memoirs of Chevalier Rafael de Weryha-Wysoczański (Kibworth Beauchamp 2016).
- Chevalier Rafael de Weryha-Wysoczanski, Tomasz Lenczewski, Genealogy of the de Weryha-Wysoczański Family, in: Genealogisches Handbuch des Adels, Adelige Häuser XXX, vol 145 (Limburg an der Lahn 2008), pp. 412–420.
- Count Jerzy Sewer Dunin-Borkowski, Spis nazwisk szlachty polskiej (Lwów 1887), p. 518.
- Encyklopedia polskiej emigracji i Polonii 5 (Toruń 2005), pp. 234-235.
- Baron Georg von Frölichsthal, Der Adel in den historischen Ländern der Habsburgermonarchie vom 19. bis 21. Jahrhundert: Index zu seinen Genealogien (Vienna 2020), p. 366, p. 373, 2nd, revised and enlarged edition of Der Adel der Habsburgermonarchie im 19. und 20. Jahrhundert. Index zu seinen Genealogien (Insingen 2008), p. 350, p. 356.
- Jan Gawron, Locators of Settlements Under Wallachian Law in the Sambor Starosty in XVth and XVIth C. Territorial, Ethnic and Social Origins, in: Balcanica Posnaniensia. Acta et studia, XXVI (Poznań 2019), pp. 269–290.
- Genealogisches Handbuch des Adels, Adelslexikon XVI (Limburg a.d. Lahn 2005), pp. 117-118, Adelslexikon XVII, Nachträge (2008), p. 534, Adelslexikon XVIII, Register (2012), p. 419, p. 433, p. 276.
- Gothaisches Genealogisches Handbuch, Adelige Häuser IV, vol 8 (Marburg 2018), pp. 486–498.
- Friedrich Heyer v. Rosenfeld, Ivan v. Bojnčić, Der Adel von Galizien, Lodomerien u. der Bukowina, in: J. Siebmacher’s großes Wappenbuch IV 14 (Nürnberg 1905), p. 244.
- Sylwester Korwin-Kruczkowski, Poczet Polaków wyniesionych do godności szlacheckiej przez monarchów austryjackich w czasie od roku 1773 do 1918. Dalej tych osób, którym wymienieni władcy zatwierdzili dawne tytuły książęce względnie hrabiowskie lub nadali tytuły hrabiów i baronów jak niemniej tych, którym zatwierdzili staropolskie szlachectwo (Lwów 1935), p. 54.
- Bronisław Minkowicz-Wysoczański, Wysoczańscy, Gniazdo i Ród 1380-1943, 2 vols (Lwów 1944).
- Kasper Niesiecki, Herbarz Polski 9 (Leipzig 1842), p. 459 and 10 (1845), p. 482.
- Poczet szlachty galicyjskiej i bukowińskiej (Lwów 1857), pp. 285-286, p. 334.
- Polak w świecie. Leksykon Polonii i Polaków za granicą (Warsaw 2001), p. 336, p. 423.
- Sir Brooks Richards, Secret Flotillas, Clandestine Sea Operations in the Mediterranean, North Africa and the Adriatic 1940-1944, vol II (London 2004).
- Spis alfabetyczny obywateli ziemskich Królestwa Polskiego (Warsaw 1906), p. 140.
- Stephen Taylor, Who's Who in Central and East-Europe (Zürich 1937).
- The Peerage
- Demeter Więckowski, Basil Wysoczański and the new church in Wysocko Wyżne [in Russian] (Lwów 1892).
