= National anthem of Ukraine =

Shche ne vmerla Ukrainy i slava, i volia
English: 'The Glory and Will (Note: Also translated as 'Freedom' and 'Liberty'.) of Ukraine Have Not Yet Perished'
- Ще не вмерла України і слава, і воля
- The sheet music for the State Anthem of Ukraine.
- National anthem of Ukraine
- Also known as: «Ще не вмерла Україна» (English: 'Ukraine Has Not Yet Perished')
- Lyrics: Pavlo Chubynskyi, 1862
- Music: Mykhailo Verbytskyi, 1863
- Adopted: 15 January 1992 (music); 6 March 2003 (lyrics)
- Preceded by: Anthem of the Ukrainian Soviet Socialist Republic

Audio sample
- National anthem of Ukraine arranged by Olexandr Morozov and performed in G minor by the National Presidential Band of Ukraine with Anatoly Molotai conducting: file; help

The State Anthem of Ukraine, (Note: Ukrainian: Державний гімн України, romanized: Deržavnyj himn Ukrainy, IPA: [derˈʒɑu̯nɪj ˈɦimn ʊkrɐˈjinɪ]) also known by its incipit "Shche ne vmerla Ukrainy i slava, i volia" (Note: Ukrainian: Ще не вмерла України і слава, і воля, IPA: [ˈʃtʃɛ ne ˈu̯mɛrlɐ ʊkrɐˈjinɪ i ˈslɑwɐ i ˈwɔlʲɐ]; lit. 'The Glory and Will of Ukraine Have Not Yet Perished') and its original title "Shche ne vmerla Ukraina", (Note: Ukrainian: Ще не вмерла Україна, IPA: [ˈʃtʃɛ ne ˈu̯mɛrlɐ ʊkrɐˈjinɐ]; lit. 'Ukraine Has Not Yet Perished') is the national anthem of Ukraine.

The lyrics are a slightly modified version of the first verse and chorus of the patriotic song "Shche ne vmerla Ukrainy", written in 1862 by Pavlo Chubynskyi, an ethnographer from Kyiv. In 1863, Mykhailo Verbytskyi, a composer and Catholic priest, composed the music to accompany Chubynskyi's lyrics. The first choral public performance of the piece was in 1864 at the Ruska Besida Theatre in Lviv.

In 1865, the song was performed in the Polish city of Przemyśl (then part of the Kingdom of Galicia and Lodomeria, Austrian Empire) during a commemoration of the Ukrainian poet Taras Shevchenko. This historic moment later became the foundation for Ukraine’s National Anthem Day, which is celebrated yearly on March 10.

In the first half of the 20th century, during unsuccessful attempts to gain independence and create a state from the territories of the Russian Empire, Poland, and Austria-Hungary, the song was the national anthem of the Ukrainian People's Republic, the West Ukrainian People's Republic, and Carpatho-Ukraine. A competition was held for a national anthem following Ukraine's secession from the Soviet Union, with one of the songs being "Za Ukrainu" by the Ukrainian writer and actor Mykola Voronyi. "Shche ne vmerla Ukrainy" was officially adopted by Ukraine's parliament on 15 January 1992. The official lyrics were adopted on 6 March 2003 by the Law on the State anthem of Ukraine (Ukrainian: Закон «Про Державний гімн України»).

== History ==
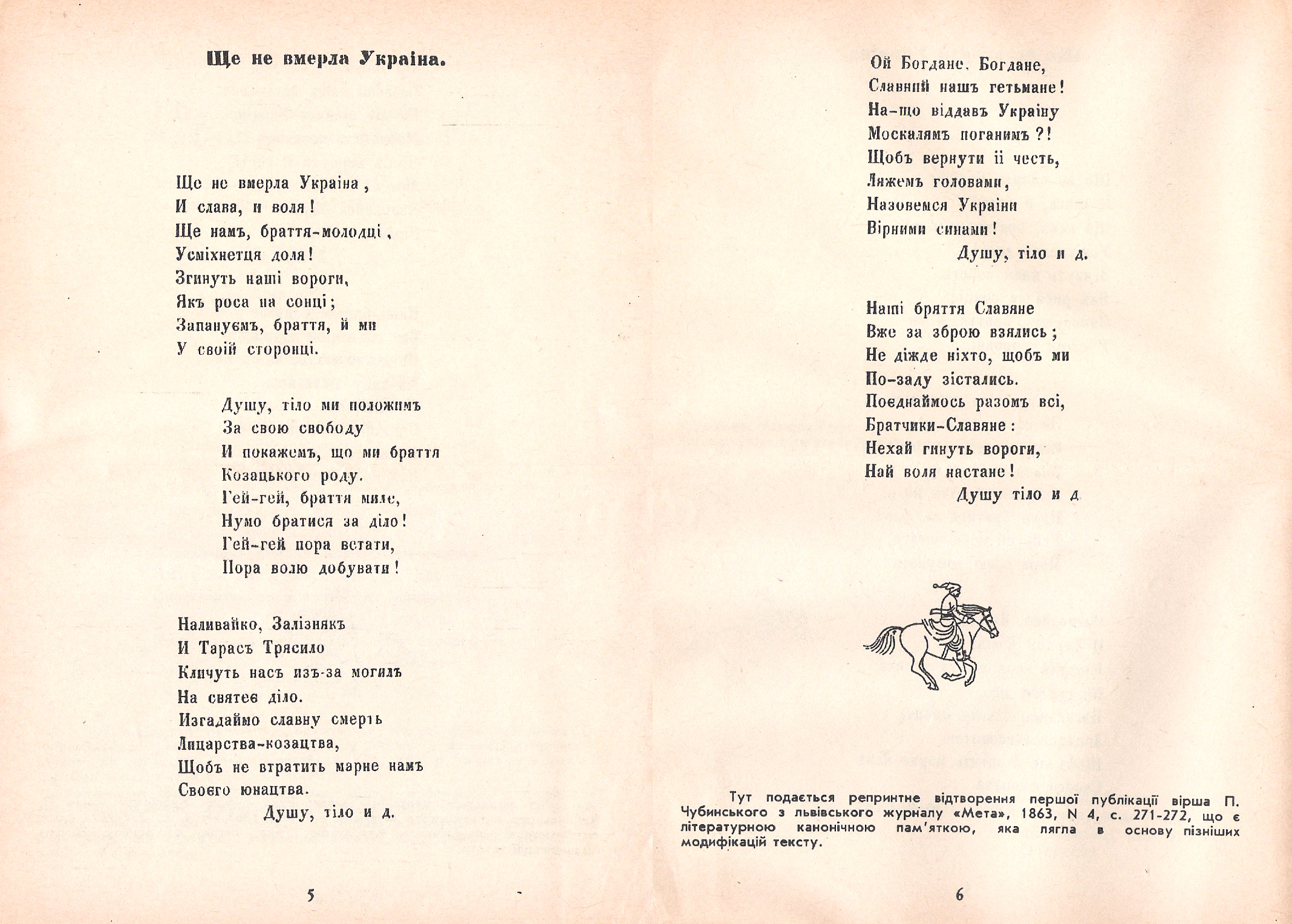
Reprint edition of the Lviv journal Meta of 1863, the first publication of the poem (Old Ukrainian orthography)

=== Background ===
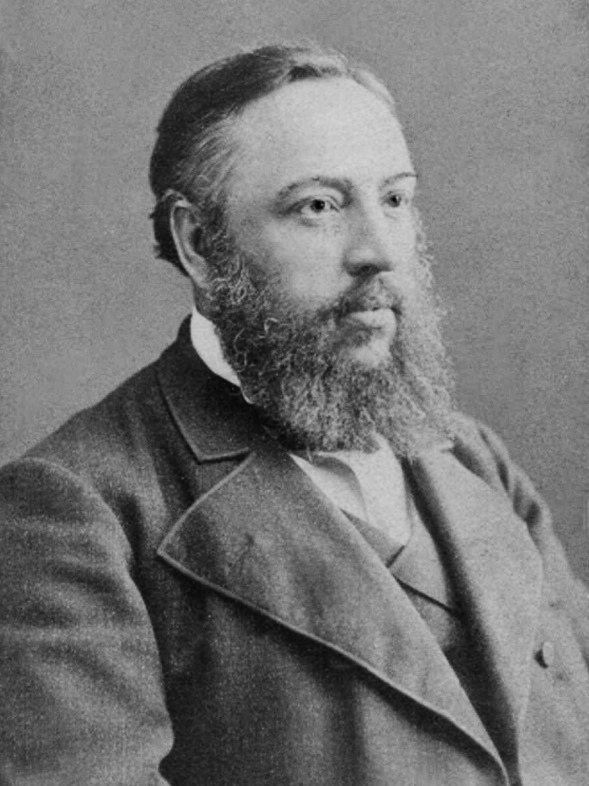
Pavlo Chubynskyi

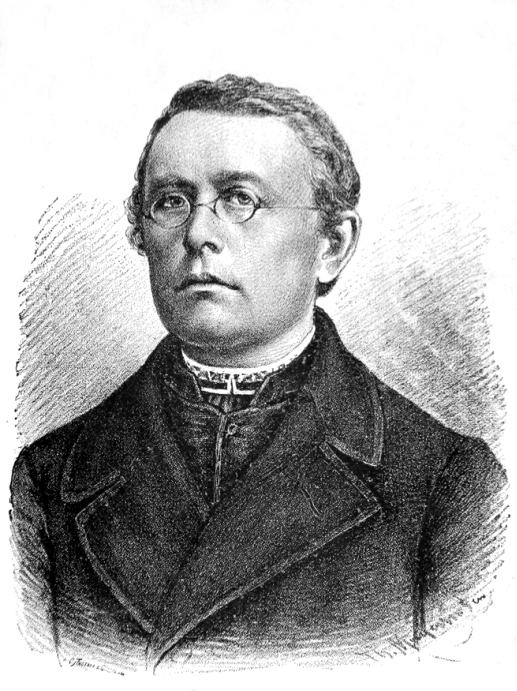
Mykhailo Verbytskyi

The Ukrainian national anthem can be traced back to one of the parties of the Ukrainian ethnographer Pavlo Chubynskyi that occurred during the autumn of 1862. Scholars think that the Polish patriotic song "Poland Is Not Yet Lost", which dates back to 1797 and later became the national anthem of Poland and the Polish Legions, also influenced Chubynskyi's lyrics. The Polish patriotic song was popular among the nations of the former Polish–Lithuanian Commonwealth that were at that time fighting for their independence; the January Uprising started a few months after Chubynskyi wrote his lyrics. According to a memoirist who was present, Chubynskyi wrote the lyrics spontaneously after listening to Serbian students singing Svetozar Miletić's "Srpska pesma" (lit. 'Serbian song') during a gathering of Serbian and Ukrainian students in an apartment in Kyiv.

Chubynskyi's words were rapidly taken up by the earliest Ukrainophiles. In 1862, the head gendarme, Prince Vasily Dolgorukov, exiled Chubynskyi to Arkhangelsk Governorate for the "dangerous influence on the minds of commoners".

The poem was first officially published in 1863 when it appeared in the fourth issue of the Lviv-based journal Meta; the journal mistakenly attributed the poem to Taras Shevchenko. It became popular in the territories that now form part of Western Ukraine and came to the attention of a member of the Ukrainian clergy, Mykhailo Verbytskyi of the Ukrainian Greek Catholic Church. Inspired by Chubynskyi's lyrics, Verbytskyi, then a prominent composer in Ukraine, decided to set it to music. The lyrics were first published with Verbytskyi's sheet music in 1865. The first choral public performance of the piece was in 1864 at the Ruska Besida Theatre in Lviv.

One of the first recordings of this anthem (then spelled "Szcze ne wmerła Ukrajiny ni sława, ni wola") in Ukrainian was released on a gramophone record by Columbia Phonograph Company during World War I in 1916. As a folk song, it was performed by a Ukrainian emigrant from Lviv and New York resident Mykhailo Zazuliak in 1915.

=== Early use ===
"Shche ne vmerla Ukraina" was not used as a state anthem until 1917 when it was adopted by the Ukrainian People's Republic as its national anthem. Still, even between 1917 and 1921, the song was not legislatively adopted as an exclusive state anthem as other anthems were also used at the time.

=== During the Soviet period ===
In 1922, the Ukrainian SSR signed the Treaty on the Creation of the USSR with the Russian SFSR, Transcaucasian SFSR, and Byelorussian SSR, which created the Soviet Union. Following the signing of the treaty, "Šče ne vmerla Ukrainy" was banned by the Soviet regime. The authorities later decided that each separate Soviet republic could have its anthem, but "Šče ne vmerla Ukrainy" was rejected in an attempt to help to suppress separatist sentiments held by Ukrainian nationalists. In 1939, "Šče ne vmerla Ukrainy" was adopted as the official state anthem of Carpatho-Ukraine.

After Joseph Stalin ordered that "The Internationale" be replaced with the State Anthem of the Soviet Union in 1944, all the constituent republics of the union were made to produce each of their representative regional anthem as well. The Ukrainian government established a commission on the anthem on 23 February 1944. Soviet authorities, after a period of struggle, successfully persuaded public intellectuals to create an anthem with lyrics fitting their political interests and music sterile of any Ukrainian national elements. On 23 February, the Ukrainian chairman Mykhailo Hrechukha started a meeting by reading a synopsis of the anthem-to-be in front of musicians and litterateurs: the Ukrainian nation's union with the Soviets were envisaged for the first stanza; the Ukrainian people, their struggles, and freedom under Lenin and Stalin were envisaged for the second stanza; Ukraine's economic and political flourishing in the union were envisaged for the third stanza. The refrain was conceived to be used after each stanza, which was considered as a paean to the union of the Soviet peoples and the reunited Ukraine following the Soviet annexation of Eastern Galicia and Volhynia.

Composers worked on the score before the decision on the lyrics; by February 1945, 11 composers were selected as finalists. Anton Lebedynets' score won with an overwhelming majority vote, and the score was adopted as the music of the new Soviet anthem in November 1949. Earlier in January 1948, the lyrics of Pavlo Tychyna and co-author Mykola Bazhan won; due to plagiarism of his text, Oleksa Novytskyi demanded to be listed as a co-author, but to no avail. On 21 November 1949, the new anthem of the Ukrainian Soviet Socialist Republic was adopted. Borys Yarovynskyi edited and reorchestrated the anthem in 1979.

=== Post-independence ===
On 15 January 1992, "Šče ne vmerla Ukrainy" was adopted by the Ukrainian Parliament, as the state anthem and was later instituted in the Ukrainian Constitution. However, the lyrics for the anthem were not officially adopted until 6 March 2003, when the Verkhovna Rada passed a law on the state anthem of Ukraine (Закон «Про Державний гімн України»), proposed by then-president Leonid Kuchma. The law proposed Mykhailo Verbytskyi's music and Pavlo Chubynskyi's first stanza and refrain of his poem "Šče ne vmerla Ukrainy". However, the first line of the lyrics was to be changed from Šče ne vmerla Ukraina, i slava, i volia to Šče ne vmerla Ukrainy i slava, i volia. (Note: There were attempts for attaining new lyrics through a commission sponsoring several contests as the Ukrainian government did not adopt Chubynskyi's lyrics due to them being considered outdated. The unsuccessful results have continued the association of the anthem with Chubynskyi's lyrics.) The law was passed with an overwhelming majority of 334 votes out of 450, with only 46 MPs opposing. Only the members of the Socialist Party of Ukraine and the Communist Party of Ukraine refrained from voting. The national anthem that up until then had only officially consisted of Mykhailo Verbytskyi's music, would henceforth also include the modified lyrics of Pavlo Chubynskyi.

The popularity of the Ukrainian anthem has become particularly high in the wake of the Orange Revolution protests of 2004 and Euromaidan of 2013. Ukrainian composer Valentyn Sylvestrov, who participated in Ukrainian protests in Kyiv, characterized the Ukrainian anthem thus:

The Ukrainian anthem is amazing. At first it doesn't impress you at all, but that's only at first glance. Indeed, this anthem was created by Mykhailo Verbytskyi, a clerical composer of the mid-19th century. He lived under the Austrian monarchy and probably was fond of Schubert; he had a euphonic gift — it's clear from his liturgical compositions. He was a church composer. And this patriotic song, he created as a church composer. This chant is a Hallelujah. No other anthem has this! It's a unique piece: the anthem of Ukraine, which at the same time has all the characteristic features of a liturgy's beginning. Some memory of a liturgy, of an all-night vigil, has submerged in this anthem. It seems as if the wind blows in this simple chant, as if tree branches are singing.

==== Since Euromaidan and the Russo-Ukrainian War ====
Protests during the 2013/2014 New Year's celebration on Maidan Nezalezhnosti in Kyiv; the protesters sing the national anthem.

During the Euromaidan protests of 2013, the anthem became a revolutionary song for the protesters. In the early weeks of the protests, they sang the national anthem once an hour, led by singer Ruslana. In World Affairs, Nadia Diuk argues that the national anthem was used as "the clarion call of the 'revolution'" during Euromaidan, which added weight to protests that previous ones, such as the Orange Revolution, lacked. In a 2014 survey, after being asked "How has your attitude toward the following changed for the last year?", the Kyiv International Institute of Sociology found that the attitude towards the Ukrainian national anthem had "improved a lot" in 25.3% of Ukrainians, especially after the start of the Russo-Ukrainian War.

After the start of the Russian invasion of Ukraine, several orchestras in Europe and North America performed the Ukrainian national anthem in order to show their solidarity with Ukraine.

== Lyrics ==
The incipit "Shche ne vmerla Ukrainy" reminds Ukrainians about their struggle for national self-identity and independence. It was sung as the de facto national anthem at the inauguration of Leonid Kravchuk, the first Ukrainian president, on 5 December 1991, but it was not until 6 March 2003 that Chubynskyi's lyrics officially became a part of the national anthem. The Constitution of Ukraine designated Verbytskyi's music for the national anthem on 28 June 1996:

The State Anthem of Ukraine is the national anthem set to the music of M. Verbytskyi, with words that are confirmed by the law adopted by no less than two-thirds of the constitutional composition of the Verkhovna Rada of Ukraine.

— Article 20 of the Constitution of Ukraine

On 6 March 2003, the Parliament of Ukraine officially adopted the anthem's lyrics, opting to use only the first stanza and refrain from Chubynskyi's original poem, while slightly modifying the first stanza.

=== Current official lyrics ===
Ukrainian original
English translation
Cyrillic script
Ukrainian National transliteration
IPA transcription (Note: See Help:IPA/Ukrainian and Ukrainian phonology.)

Ще не вмерла України і слава, і воля,
Ще нам, браття молодії, усміхнеться доля.
Згинуть наші воріженьки, як роса на сонці.
Запануєм і ми, браття, у своїй сторонці.

𝄆 Душу й тіло ми положим за нашу свободу,
І покажем, що ми, браття, козацького роду. 𝄇

Shche ne vmerla Ukrainy i slava, i volia.
Shche nam, brattia molodii, usmikhnetsia dolia.
Zghynut nashi vorizhenky, yak rosa na sontsi,
Zapanuiem i my, brattia, u svoii storontsi.

𝄆 Dushu i tilo my polozhym za nashu svobodu,
I pokazhem, shcho my, brattia, kozatskoho rodu. 𝄇

[ʃtʃɛ nɛ ˈwmɛɾ.ɫɐ ʊ.kɾɐˈ(j)i.nɪ i ˈsɫɑ.ʋɐ i ˈwɔ.lʲɐ |]
[ʃtʃɛ nɑm ˈbɾɑ.tʲːɐ mo.ɫoˈdi.(j)i | ʊs.mixˈnɛtʲ.sʲɐ ˈdɔ.lʲɐ ‖]
[ˈzɦɪ.nʊtʲ ˈnɑ.ʃi wo.ɾiˈʒɛnʲ.kɪ | jɑk roˈsɑ nɑ ˈsɔn.tsi |]
[zɐ.pɐˈnu.jem i mɪ ˈbɾɑ.tʲːɐ | u swoˈ(j)ij stoˈɾɔn.tsi ‖]

𝄆 [ˈdu.ʃʊ‿j ˈti.ɫo mɪ poˈɫɔ.ʒɪm | zɑ ˈnɑ.ʃʊ swoˈbɔ.dʊ |]
[i poˈkɑ.ʒem ʃtʃɔ mɪ ˈbɾɑ.tʲːɐ | koˈzɑtsʲ.ko.ɦo ˈɾɔ.dʊ ‖] 𝄇

The glory and will of Ukraine has not yet perished,
And yet still upon us, brothers, fate shall smile once more.
Our enemies shall melt away, like the dew in the sun.
And we too shall rule, O brethen, the homeland of our own.

𝄆 Soul and body shall we lay down for our liberty,
And we'll show, O brethen, that we're a Cossack family! 𝄇

=== Full modern lyrics ===
The first verse and chorus of the following lyrics constitute a more popular (commonly performed) version of the anthem. Differences from the official lyrics are italicized.

Ukrainian original
English translation
Cyrillic script
Latin script
IPA transcription

I
Ще не вмерла України ні слава, ні воля.
Ще нам, браття-українці, усміхнеться доля.
Згинуть наші вороженьки, як роса на сонці,
Запануєм і ми, браття, у своїй сторонці.

Приспів:
Душу й тіло ми положим за нашу свободу,
І покажем, що ми, браття, козацького роду!

II
Станем браття, в бій кривавий, від Сяну до Дону
В ріднім краю панувати не дамо нікому.
Чорне море ще всміхнеться, дід Дніпро зрадіє,
Ще на нашій Україні доленька наспіє.

Приспів

III
А завзяття, праця щира (Note: Also written щира праця (ščyra pracia).) свого ще докаже,
Ще ся волі в Україні піснь гучна розляже.
За Карпати відіб’ється, згомонить степами,
України слава стане поміж народами.

𝄆 Приспів 𝄇

I
Shche ne vmerla Ukrainy ni slava, ni volia,
Shche nam, brattia-ukrainci, usmichnetsia dolia.
Zhynut nashi voroshenky, jak rosa na sonci,
Zapanujem i my, brattia, u svoij storonci.

Pryspiv:
Dushu j tilo my polozhym za nashu svobodu,
I pokazhem, shcho my, brattia, kozatskoho rodu!

II
Stanem brattia, v bij kryvavyj, vid Sianu do Donu
V ridnim kraju panuvaty ne damo nikomu.
Chorne more shche vsmichnetsia, did Dnipro zradije,
Shche na nashij Ukraini dolenka naspije.

Pryspiv

III
A zavziattia pracia shchyra svoho shche dokazhe,
Shche sia voli v Ukraini pisn huchna rozliazhe.
Za Karpaty vidibjetsia zhomonyt stepamy,
Ukrainy slava stane pomizh narodamy.

𝄆 Pryspiv 𝄇

1
[ʃt͡ʃɛ nɛ‿ˈu̯mɛɾ.ɫɐ ʊ.kɾɐ.ˈji.nɪ | ni ˈsɫɑ.ʋɐ ni ˈwɔ.lʲɐ |]
[ʃt͡ʃɛ nɑm ˈbɾɑ.tʲːɐ ʊ.kɾɐ.ˈjin.t͡si | ʊs.mix.ˈnɛ.t͡sʲːɐ ˈdɔ.lʲɐ ‖]
[ˈzɦɪ.nʊtʲ ˈnɑ.ʃi wo.ɾo.ˈʒɛnʲ.kɪ | jɑk ro.ˈsɑ nɑ ˈsɔn.t͡si |]
[zɐ.pɐ.ˈnu.jem i mɪ ˈbɾɑ.tʲːɐ | u swo.ˈjij sto.ˈɾɔn.t͡si ‖]

[ˈpɾɪs.piu̯]
[ˈdu.ʃʊ‿j ˈti.ɫo mɪ po.ˈɫɔ.ʒɪm | zɑ ˈnɑ.ʃʊ swo.ˈbɔ.dʊ |]
[i po.ˈkɑ.ʒem ʃt͡ʃɔ mɪ ˈbɾɑ.tʲːɐ | ko.ˈzɑt͡sʲ.ko.ɦo ˈrɔ.dʊ ‖]

2
[ˈstɑ.nem ˈbɾɑ.tʲːɐ u̯‿bij kɾɪ.ˈʋɑ.ʋɪj | ʋid ˈsʲɑ.nʊ dɔ ˈdɔ.nʊ |]
[ˈu̯‿ɾid.nim ˈkɾɑ.jʊ pɐ.nʊ.ˈʋɑ.tɪ nɛ dɐ.ˈmɔ ni.ˈkɔ.mʊ ‖]
[ˈt͡ʃɔɾ.ne ˈmɔ.ɾe ʃt͡ʃɛ u̯s.mix.ˈnɛ.t͡sʲːɐ | did dni.ˈpɾɔ zɾɐ.ˈdi.je |]
[ʃt͡ʃɛ nɑ ˈnɑ.ʃij ʊ.kɾɐ.ˈji.ni ˈdɔ.ɫenʲ.kɐ nɐs.ˈpi.je ‖]

[ˈpɾɪs.piu̯]

3
[ɑ zɐu̯.ˈzʲɑ.tʲːɐ | ˈpɾɑ.t͡sʲɐ ˈʃt͡ʃɪ.ɾɐ swo.ˈɦɔ ʃt͡ʃɛ do.ˈkɑ.ʒe |]
[ʃt͡ʃɛ sʲɑ ˈwɔ.li w‿ʊ.kɾɐ.ˈji.ni pisnʲ ɦʊt͡ʃ.ˈnɑ roz.ˈlʲɑ.ʒe ‖]
[zɑ kɐɾ.ˈpɑ.tɪ ʋi.di.ˈbjɛ.t͡sʲːɐ | zɦo.mo.ˈnɪtʲ ste.ˈpɑ.mɪ |]
[ʊ.kɾɐ.ˈji.nɪ ˈsɫɑ.ʋɐ ˈstɑ.ne ˈpɔ.miʒ ˈnɑ.ɾo.dɐ.mɪ ‖]

𝄆 [ˈpɾɪs.piu̯] 𝄇

I
The glory and will of Ukraine has not yet perished,
And yet upon us, Ukrainians, fate shall smile once more.
Our enemies shall melt away, like the dew in the sun.
And we too shall rule, O brethen, the homeland of our own.

𝄆 Soul and body shall we lay down for our liberty,
And we'll show, O brethen, that we're a Cossack family! 𝄇

II
Brethren, let's join in a bloody fight, from the Sian to the Don
Ne'er shall we allow others to rule in our native land.
The Black Sea will smile, and grandfather Dnipro will rejoice,
For in our own Ukraine fortune shall flourish once again.

Chorus

III
Our persistence and our sincere toils will be rewarded,
And freedom's song will resound throughout all of Ukraine.
Echoing off the Carpathians, and rumbling across the steppes,
Ukraine's fame and glory shall be known among all nations.

𝄆 Chorus 𝄇

=== Original lyrics (1862) ===
The first stanza of Chubynskyi's original poem is somewhat similar to the first stanza of national anthems of Poland and Yugoslavia and "Hatikvah", the national anthem of Israel.

Ukrainian original
English translation
Cyrillic script
(old orthography)
Latin script
IPA transcription

I
Ще не вмерла Україна, і слава, і воля!
Ще нам, браття молодії, усміхнеться доля!
Згинуть наші воріженьки, як роса на сонці;
Запануєм і ми, браття у своїй сторонці.

Приспів:
Душу й тіло ми положим за нашу свободу
І покажем, що ми браття козацького роду.
Гей-гей, браття миле, нумо братися за діло!
Гей-гей пора встати, пора волю добувати!

II
Наливайко, Залізнякъ и Тарасъ Трясило
Кличуть насъ изъ-за могилъ на святеє діло.
Изгадаймо славну смерть лицарства-козацтва,
Щобъ не втратить марне намъ своєго юнацтва.

Приспів

III
Ой Богдане, Богдане славний нашъ гетьмане!
На-що віддавъ Украіну москалямъ поганимъ?!
Щобъ вернути її честь, ляжемъ головами,
Назовемся Украіни вірними синами!

Приспів

IV
Наші браття Славяне вже за зброю взялись;
Не діжде ніхто, щобъ ми по-заду зістались.
Поєднаймось разомъ всі, братчики-Славяне:
Нехай гинуть вороги, най воля настане!

Приспів

I
Shche ne vmerla Ukraina, i slava, i volia!
Shche nam, brattia molodii, usmichnetsia dolia!
Zhynut nashi vorizhenky, jak rosa na sonci;
Zapanujem i my, brattia u svoij storonci.

Pryspiv:
Dushu j tilo my polozhym za nashu svobodu
I pokashem, shcho my brattia kozatskoho rodu.
Hej-hej, brattia myle, numo bratysia za dilo!
Hej-hej, pora vstaty, pora voliu dobuvaty!

II
Nalyvajko, Zalizniak y Taras Triasylo
Klychut nas yz-za mohyl na sviateje dilo.
Yzhadajmo slavnu smert lycarstva-kozactva,
Shchob ne vtratyt marne nam svojeho junactva.

Pryspiv

III
Oj Bohdane, Bohdane slavnyj nash hetmane!
Na-shcho viddav Ukrainu moskaliam pohanym?!
Shchob vernuty ii chest, liazhem holovamy,
Nazovemsia Ukrainy virnymy synamy!

Pryspiv

IV
Nashi brattia Slaviane vzhe za zbroju vzialys;
Ne dizhde nichto, shchob my po-zadu zistalys.
Pojednajmos razom vsi, bratchyky-Slaviane:
Nechaj hynut vorohy, naj volia nastane!

Pryspiv

1
[ʃt͡ʃɛ nɛ ˈu̯mɛɾ.ɫɐ ʊ.kɾɐ.ˈji.nɐ | i ˈsɫɑ.ʋɐ i ˈwɔ.lʲɐ ‖]
[ʃt͡ʃɛ nɑm ˈbɾɑ.tʲːɐ mo.ɫo.ˈdi.ji | ʊs.mix.ˈnɛ.t͡sʲːɐ ˈdɔ.lʲɐ ‖]
[ˈzɦɪ.nʊtʲ ˈnɑ.ʃi wo.ɾi.ˈʒɛnʲ.kɪ | jɑk ro.ˈsɑ nɑ ˈsɔn.t͡si |]
[zɐ.pɐ.ˈnu.jem i mɪ ˈbɾɑ.tʲːɐ | u swo.ˈjij sto.ˈrɔn.t͡si ‖]

[ˈprɪs.piu̯]
[ˈdu.ʃʊ‿j ˈti.ɫo mɪ po.ˈɫɔ.ʒɪm zɑ ˈnɑ.ʃʊ swo.ˈbɔ.dʊ |]
[i po.ˈkɑ.ʒem ʃt͡ʃɔ mɪ ˈbɾɑ.tʲːɐ | ko.ˈzɑt͡sʲ.ko.ɦo ˈrɔ.dʊ ‖]
[ɦɛj.ˈɦɛj ˈbɾɑ.tʲːɐ ˈmɪ.ɫe | ˈnu.mo ˈbɾɑ.tɪ.sʲɐ zɑ ˈdi.ɫo ‖]
[ɦɛj.ˈɦɛj po.ˈɾɑ ˈu̯stɑ.tɪ | po.ˈɾɑ ˈwɔ.lʲʊ do.bʊ.ˈʋɑ.tɪ ‖]

2
[nɐ.ɫɪ.ˈʋɑj.ko | zɐ.liz.ˈnʲɑk ɪ tɐ.ˈɾɑs tɾʲɐ.ˈsɪ.ɫo |]
[ˈkɫɪ.t͡ʃʊtʲ nɑs ˈiz.zɑ mo.ˈɦɪɫ nɑ sʋʲɐ.ˈtɛ.je ˈdi.ɫo ‖]
[iz.ɦɐ.ˈdɑj.mo ˈsɫɑu̯.nʊ smɛɾtʲ ɫɪ.ˌt͡sɑɾ.stʋɐ.ko.ˈzɑt͡s.tʋɐ |]
[ʃt͡ʃɔb nɛ ˈu̯tɾɑ.tɪtʲ ˈmɑɾ.ne nɑm swo.je.ˈɦɔ jʊ.ˈnɑt͡s.tʋɐ ‖]

[ˈprɪs.piu̯]

3
[ɔj boɦ.ˈdɑ.ne boɦ.ˈdɑ.ne ˈsɫɑu̯.nɪj nɑʃ ˈɦɛtʲ.mɐ.ne |]
[nɑ ʃt͡ʃɔ ʋid.ˈdɑu̯ ʊ.kɾɐ.ˈji.nʊ mos.kɐ.ˈlʲɑm po.ˈɦɑ.nɪm ‖]
[ʃt͡ʃɔb ʋeɾ.ˈnu.tɪ ji.ˈji t͡ʃɛstʲ | ˈlʲɑ.ʒem ˈɦɔ.ɫo.ʋɐ.mɪ |]
[nɐ.zo.ˈʋɛm.sʲɐ ʊ.kɾɐ.ˈji.nɪ ˈʋiɾ.nɪ.mɪ sɪ.ˈnɑ.mɪ ‖]

[ˈprɪs.piu̯]

4
[ˈnɑ.ʃi ˈbɾɑ.tʲːɐ sɫɐ.ˈʋjɑ.ne u̯ʒɛ zɑ ˈzbɾɔ.jʊ ˈu̯zʲɑ.ɫɪsʲ |]
[nɛ diʒ.ˈdɛ nix.ˈtɔ | ʃt͡ʃɔb mɪ pɔ zɐ.ˈdu zi.ˈstɑ.ɫɪsʲ ‖]
[po.jed.ˈnɑj.mosʲ ˈrɑ.zom u̯si | ˈbɾɑ.t͡ʃːɪ.kɪ sɫɐ.ˈʋjɑ.ne |]
[ne.ˈxɑj ˈɦɪ.nʊtʲ wo.ɾo.ˈɦɪ | nɑj ˈwɔ.lʲɐ nɐ.ˈstɑ.ne ‖]

[ˈprɪs.piu̯]

I
The glory and will of Ukraine has not yet perished,
And yet upon us, Ukrainians, fate shall smile once more.
Our enemies shall melt away, like the dew in the sun.
And we too shall rule, O brethen, the homeland of our own.

Chorus:
𝄆 Soul and body shall we lay down for our liberty,
And we'll show, O brethen, that we're a Cossack family! 𝄇
Hey, hey, dearest brothers, onward, take to battle
Hey, hey, it's time to rise, time to gain liberty!

II
Nalyvaiko, Zalizniak and Taras Triasylo
Call us from the grave beyond to the battle holy.
Recall the famous death of the Chivalrous Cossacks
So that we do not lose our youth vainly.

Chorus

III
O Bohdan, O Bohdan, our glorious hetman
For what didst thou give Ukraine to those wretched Moskals?!
In returning her honor, we all lay our heads
And we all shall call ourselves Ukraine's faithful sons!

Chorus

IV
Our Slavic brethen have already taken up arms
So that no one will come attack us behind out backs.
Let us all unite together, O Slavic brethen:
So that enemies perish, and that freedom cometh!

Chorus

== Adaptations ==
Performance by the US Navy Band

1915 performance (two verses) by Mykhailo Zazuliak

1939 performance by the Soim of Carpatho-Ukraine

c. 2020 performance by the National Exemplary Band of the Armed Forces of Ukraine

The song "Slava Ukraini!", written as a "song of resistance" during the 2022 Russian invasion of Ukraine, is inspired by the opening motif of the Ukrainian national anthem.

== Notable arrangements and performances ==
- "Ukraine has not perished!". Mykhailo Zazulyak. Columbia Studio, U.S., 1915;
- "Ukraine has already risen!" (Вже воскресла Україна!) (1926 year) by Mykhailo Zazulyak;
- National anthem of Ukraine (Rock Version) by Nicky Rubchenko;
- Anthem of Ukraine performed by 14 nationalities of Ukraine;
- Anthem of Ukraine in orchestral and instrumental arrangement by Anatoly Avdievskyi;
- National anthem of Ukraine performed by Apocalyptica;
- National anthem of Ukraine performed by Dzidzio;
- National anthem of Ukraine performed by Tina Karol;
- National anthem of Ukraine performed by Jamala
- National anthem of Ukraine performed by Oleksandr Ponomaryov
- National anthem of Ukraine performed by Vopli Vidopliassova

== See also ==
- "Prayer for Ukraine"
- "Zaporizhian March"
- "Oi u luzi chervona kalyna"
- "March of Ukrainian Nationalists"
- "Za Ukrainu"
- Slava Ukraini
- "Slava Ukraini!"

== Sources ==
- Bristow, Michael Jamieson (2006). National Anthems of the World (11th ed.). London: Weidenfeld & Nicolson. ISBN 978-0-304-36826-6.
- Hang, Xing (2003). Encyclopedia of National Anthems. Lanham: Scarecrow Press. ISBN 978-0-8108-4847-4.
- Hrytsak, Yaroslav (2005). "On Sails and Gales, and Ships Driving in Various Directions: Post-Soviet Ukraine as a Test Case for the Meso-Area Concept". In Matsuzato, Kimitaka (ed.). Emerging Meso-areas in the Former Socialist Countries: histories revised or improvised?. Hokkaido University. ISBN 978-4-938637-35-4.
- Khrebtan-Hörhager, Julia (3 July 2016). "Collages of Memory: Remembering the Second World War Differently as the Epistemology of Crafting Cultural Conflicts between Russia and Ukraine". Journal of Intercultural Communication Research. 45 (4): 282–303. doi:10.1080/17475759.2016.1184705. S2CID 147896427.
- Klid, Bohdan (2008). "Songwriting and Singing: Ukrainian Revolutionary and Not So Revolutionary Activities in the 1860s". Journal of Ukrainian Studies: 264–277.
- Kubijovyč, Volodymyr (1963). Ukraine: a concise encyclopedia. Vol. 1. University of Toronto Press. ISBN 978-0-8020-3261-4.
- Kulyk, Volodymyr (20 April 2016). "National Identity in Ukraine: Impact of Euromaidan and the War". Europe-Asia Studies. 68 (4): 588–608. doi:10.1080/09668136.2016.1174980. S2CID 147826053.
- Magocsi, Paul Robert (2010). A History of Ukraine: The Land and Its Peoples (2nd ed.). Toronto: University of Toronto Press. ISBN 978-1-4426-4085-6.
- Struk, Danylo Husar, ed. (1993). "Verbytskyi, Mykhailo". Encyclopedia of Ukraine. Vol. 5. Toronto: University of Toronto Press. ISBN 978-0-8020-3010-8 – via Internet Archive.
- Yekelchyk, Serhy (2003). "When Stalin's Nations Sang: Writing the Soviet Ukrainian Anthem (1944–1949)". Nationalities Papers. 31 (3): 309–326. doi:10.1080/0090599032000115510. S2CID 162023479.
