= Warsaw Uprising Memorial (Hamburg) =

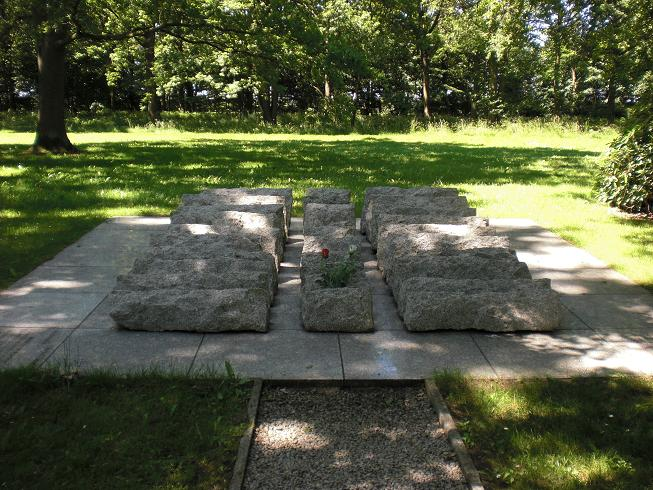
- Warsaw Uprising Memorial in Hamburg
- Artist: Jan de Weryha-Wysoczański
- Year: 1999
- Medium: Granite sculpture
- Subject: Warsaw Uprising
- Location: Hamburg; 53°26′7.55″N 10°14′2.13″E

The Warsaw Uprising Memorial in memory of the deportees of the 1944 Warsaw Uprising stands in the park of the memorial to the victims of the Neuengamme Nazi concentration camp at Hamburg.

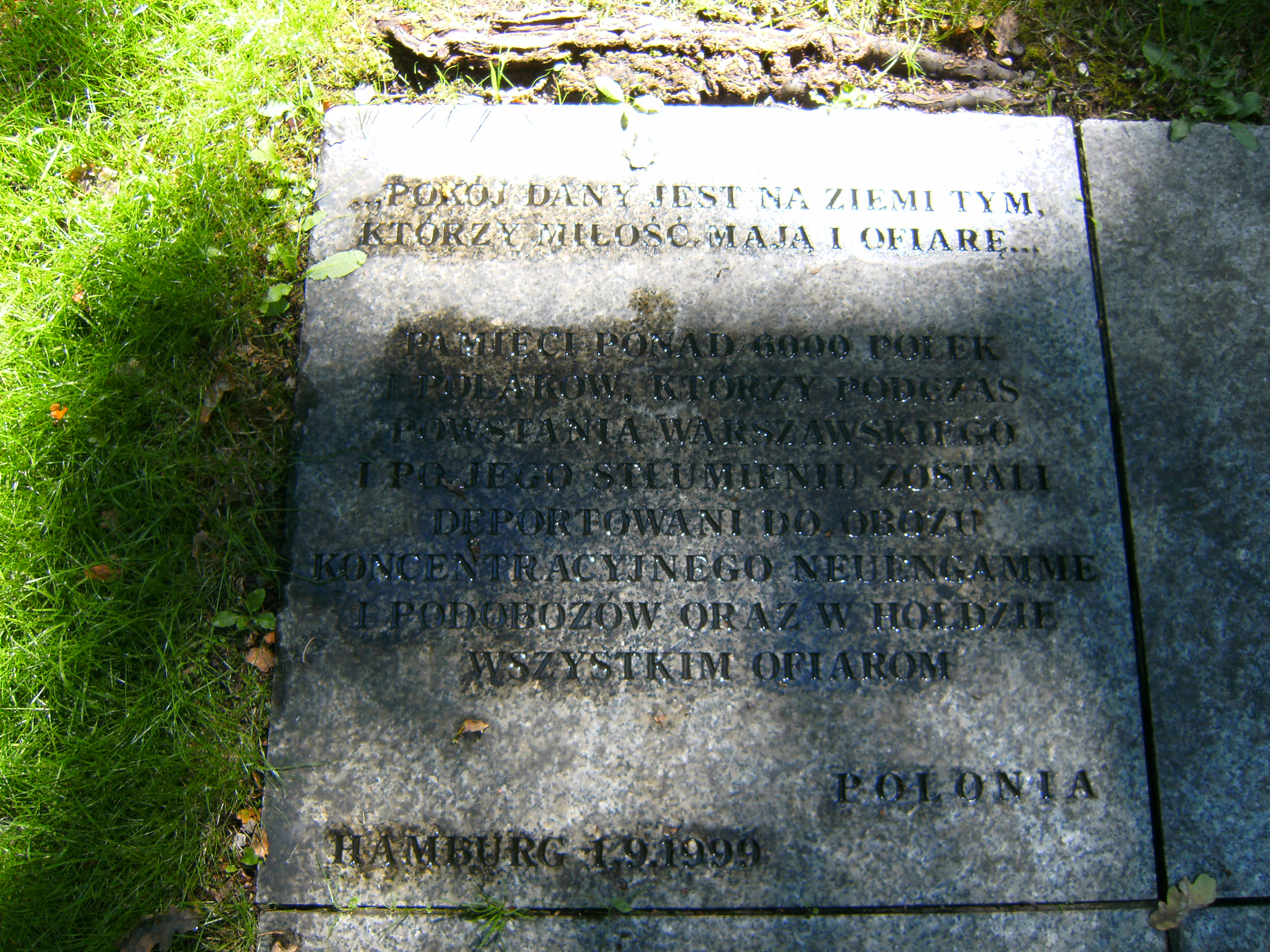
Hamburg, Memorial of Neuengamme concentration camp: memorial area, memorial stone for the victims of the 1944 Warsaw Uprising

It was unveiled on 1 September 1999 among others by Hamburg culture senator Christina Weiss and in the presence of novelist Andrzej Szczypiorski. On a polished surface made up of 36 elements, two of which with German and Polish texts on opposite sides, and to be walked on, are positioned in three rows 30 rough-hewn granite blocks. A gravel path is leading to the front side of the sculpture with which it forms a small valley. The stone used is exclusively Polish Strzegom granite. The memorial is dedicated to the 6000 Poles deported from the 1944 Warsaw Uprising to the Nazi concentration camp in Neuengamme and was initiated by the Polish community in Hamburg commemorating at the same time the 60th anniversary of the outbreak of World War II. Polish sculptor Jan de Weryha-Wysoczański created the monument pro bono.

== See also ==
- Monument to the Women of the Warsaw Uprising
- The Little Insurrectionist
- Warsaw Uprising Monument
- Warsaw Rising Museum
- Warsaw Ghetto Uprising
