= Basil de Weryha-Wysoczański =

The Chevalier de Weryha-Wysoczański-Pietrusiewicz
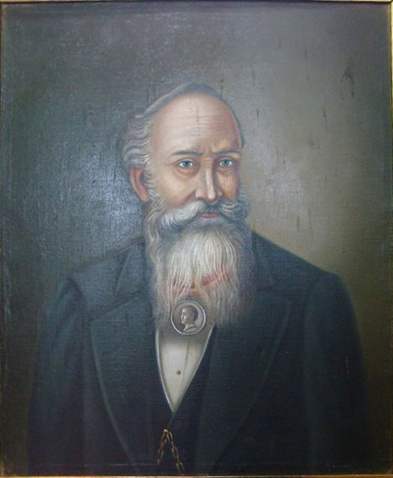
- Born: 23 April 1816; Wysocko Wyżne, Austrian Empire
- Died: 25 October 1891 (aged 75); Odessa, Russian Empire
- Occupations: Wholesale merchant; landowner; town property owner; philanthropist
- Awards: Silver Medal on the Ribbon of Saint Stanislas

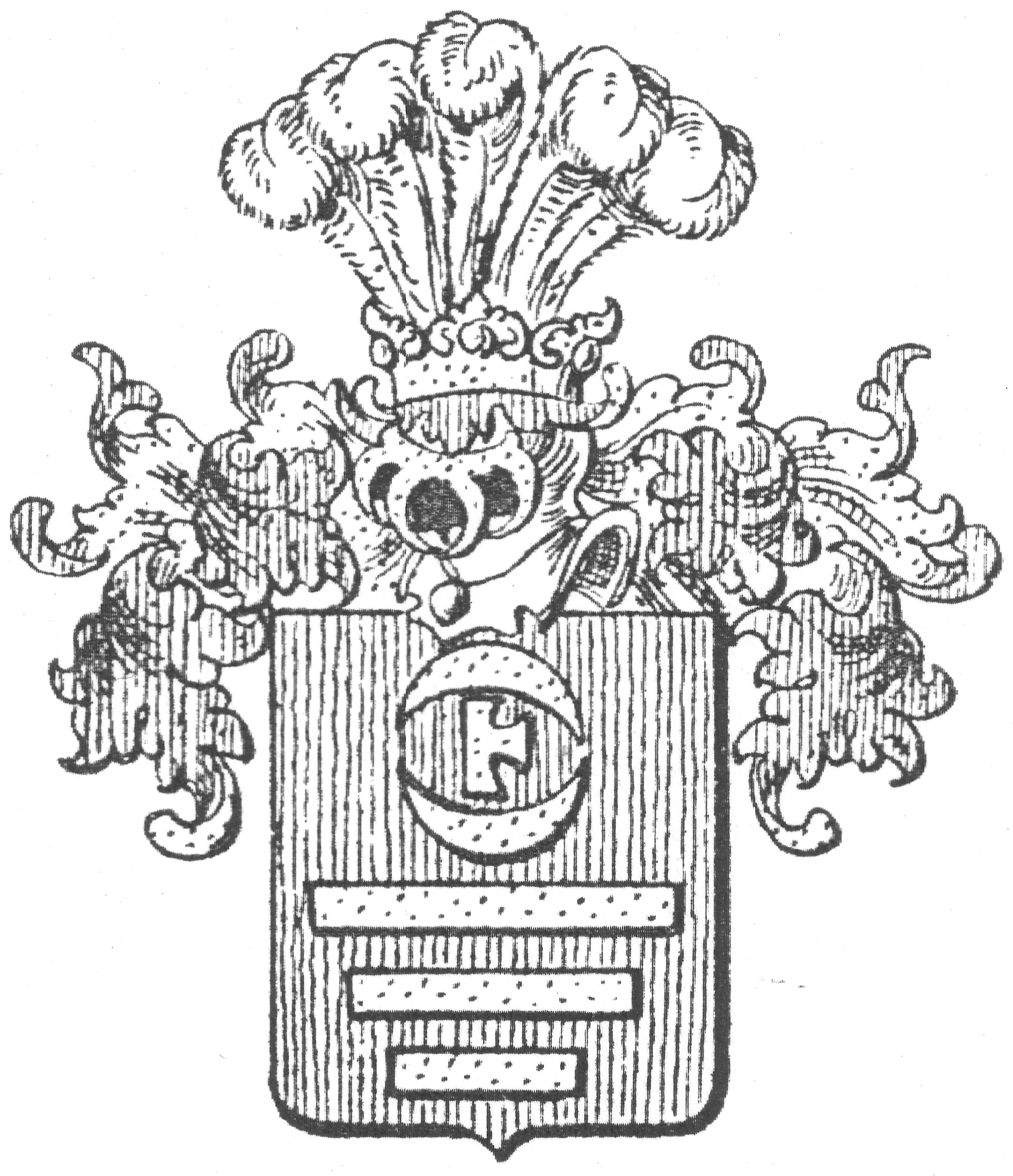
The Wukry coat of arms

Basil, 1st Chevalier de Weryha-Wysoczański-Pietrusiewicz (23 April 1816 – 25 October 1891) was a Polish wholesale merchant, landowner, town property owner and philanthropist from Odessa.

He came from an old noble family of Walachian boyar stock and was the 4th son of Jan, 2nd Chevalier Wysoczański de Pietrusiewicz. He had one daughter, Wilhelmine, who married a Swiss rentier and died at age 19 in Cannes, as well a favoured place of her father and of the international nobility in general. The son of his niece Anna was composer Yaroslav Yaroslavenko, for whom de Weryha-Wysoczański stood sponsor.

== Biography ==
Born in the Austrian Empire, de Weryha-Wysoczański made his money, as his biographer informs us in 1892, with vodka supplies for the army during the Crimean War. As a result, he bought landed estates and town property and ‘became a merchant on a grand scale’. According to his biographer, he once lost a whole ship on the sea but more than made up his losses. He soon got rid of a café-pâtisserie on Odessa's famous Deribasovskaya Street and, as his biographer puts it, ‘became a fully-fledged gentleman capitalist’. His biographer estimated that de Weryha-Wysoczański's cash alone amounted to £11.700.000. In 1861 he was awarded the Silver Medal on the Ribbon of Saint Stanislas and in 1876 received a confirmation of the title of Hereditary Chevalier of Galicia with the Wukry coat of arms, extended to all direct descendants in the male line of his elder brother Gregory, some of whom still living to this day. He died in Odessa in the Russian Empire.

== Philanthropy ==
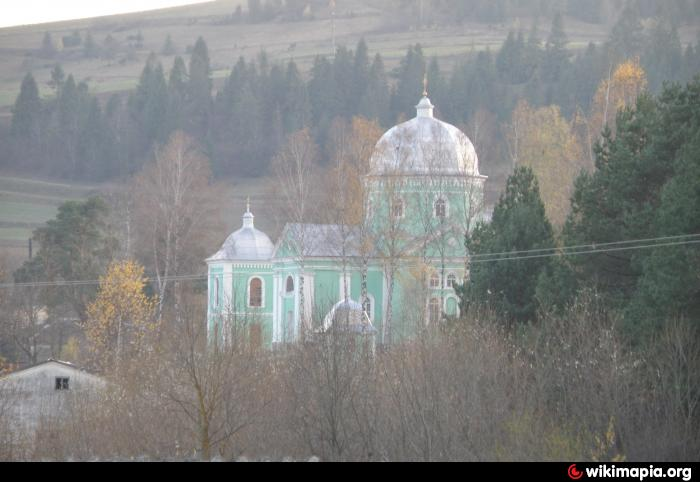
St. Nicholas Church in Wysocko Wyżne donated by Basil, 1st Chevalier de Weryha-Wysoczański-Pietrusiewicz, built by Jan Lewiński

De Weryha-Wysoczański donated £2.340.000 for scholarships, for the education of children. After the death of his only daughter, he gave in Odessa, in February 1885, £900.000 for orphaned girls who would be paid dowries. He founded the Saint Nicholas Church in Wysocko Wyżne, Austro-Hungarian Empire, the consecration of which took place on 13 October 1891. Its architect was Jan Lewiński and its polychromy was carried out by Teofil Kopystyński. It is a large church with both neoclassical and neobyzantine elements.

== In popular culture ==
In 1930 de Weryha-Wysoczański's life was made into a biographical novel by Ivan Fylypchak by the title Willpower (Lwów 1930; second edition Sambor 1999). De Weryha-Wysoczański features in it with his real name, although other names were changed, as well as some facts for reasons of dramatisation.

== Bibliography ==
- Genealogisches Handbuch des Adels, Adelslexikon XVI, Limburg a.d. Lahn 2005, vol. 137, p. 117, ISBN 3-7980-0837-X, OCLC 1570546.
- Sylwester Korwin-Kruczkowski, Poczet Polaków wyniesionych do godności szlacheckiej przez monarchów austryjackich w czasie od roku 1773 do 1918. Dalej tych osób, którym wymienieni władcy zatwierdzili dawne tytuły książęce względnie hrabiowskie lub nadali tytuły hrabiów i baronów jak niemniej tych, którym zatwierdzili staropolskie szlachectwo, Lwów 1935, p. 54.
