= Verkhnie Vysotske =

Verkhnie Vysotske Верхнє Висоцьке
- Village
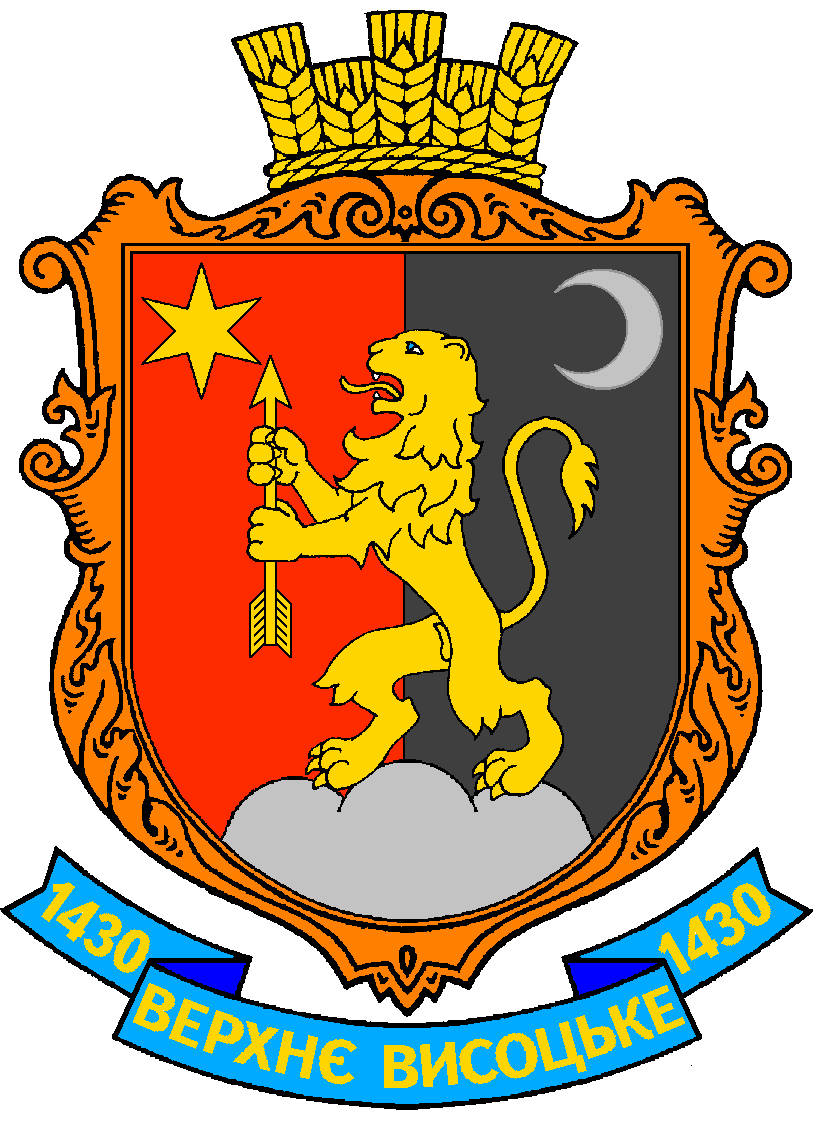
- Coat of arms

- Location within Lviv Oblast
- Coordinates: 48°57′07″N 23°04′16″E
- Country: Ukraine
- Oblast: Lviv Oblast
- Raion: Sambir Raion
- Hromada: Borynia settlement hromada
- Area: 4 km^{2} (1.5 sq mi)
- Elevation: 651 m (2,136 ft)
- Population: 2,118
  - Density: 530/km^{2} (1,400/sq mi)
- Time zone: UTC+2 (EET)
  - Summer (DST): UTC+3 (EEST)
- Postal code: 82554
- Area code: +380 3269

Verkhnie Vysotske (Ukrainian: Верхнє Висоцьке; Polish: Wysocko Wyżne) is a village (selo) in Sambir Raion, Lviv Oblast, in south-west Ukraine, situated in the Ukrainian part of the Carpathian Mountains. It belongs to Borynia settlement hromada, one of the hromadas of Ukraine.

The village was established in the second half of the 15th century.

Until 18 July 2020, Verkhnie Vysotske belonged to Turka Raion. The raion was abolished in July 2020 as part of the administrative reform of Ukraine, which reduced the number of raions of Lviv Oblast to seven. The area of Turka Raion was merged into Sambir Raion.

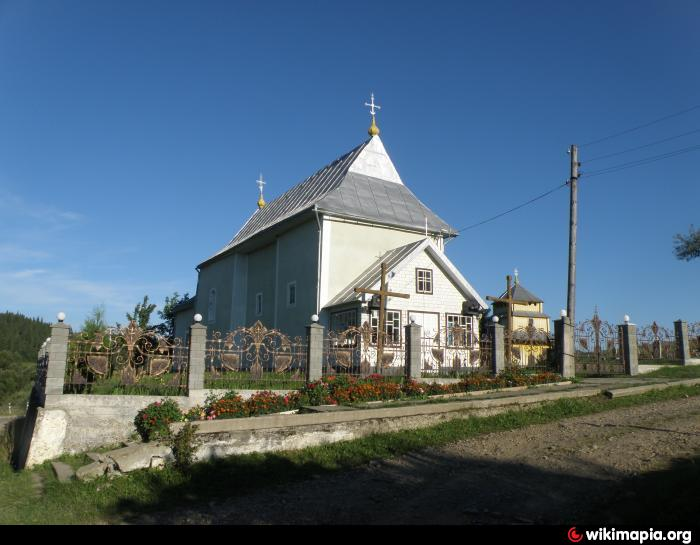
Church of the Assumption of the Blessed Virgin Mary

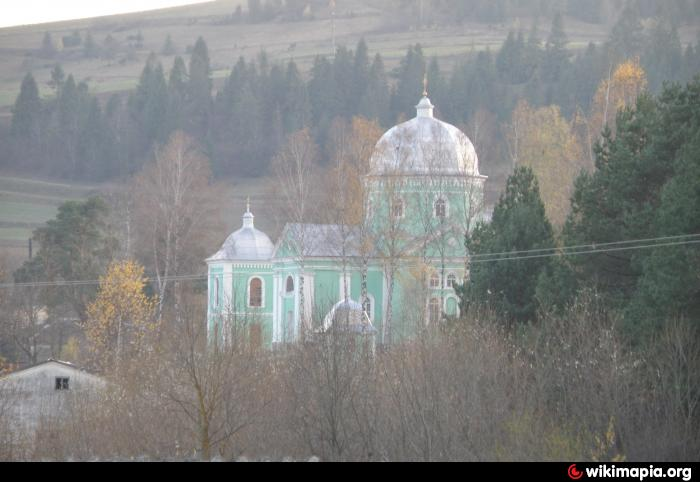
St. Nicholas Church donated by Basil, 1st Chevalier de Weryha-Wysoczański-Pietrusiewicz

== People from Verkhnie Vysotske ==
- Wiktor Wysoczański, Bishop of the Polish Catholic Church
- Basil, 1st Chevalier de Weryha-Wysoczański-Pietrusiewicz, wholesale merchant, landowner, town property owner and philanthropist in Odesa
