= Rafał de Weryha-Wysoczański =

Chevalier Rafał Hugon Maria de Weryha-Wysoczański-Pietrusiewicz (born May 7, 1975) is a Polish art historian, genealogist and writer, who was a representative of the auction house Sotheby's.

Per the "Genealogy of the de Weryha-Wysoczański Family" pedigree he produced for the Genealogisches Handbuch des Adels in 2008, he is the only child of sculptor Jan, 6th Chevalier de Weryha-Wysoczański-Pietrusiewicz, and nephew of Olympic Bronze Medallist and Vice World Champion in fencing Madame Ryszard Weryha-Wysoczańska-Pietrusiewicz and millionaire landowner and philanthropist Basil, 1st Chevalier de Weryha-Wysoczański-Pietrusiewicz.

== Biography ==
Born in Gdynia, Poland, he was educated at the University of Hamburg and on a national merit-based scholarship at Magdalene College, Cambridge, where he became a member of the Cambridge University Heraldic and Genealogical Society. From a long line of womanisers in his family, he became a playboy and completed his doctorate – for which he was awarded another merit scholarship – under the supervision of Leibniz laureate Professor Martin Warnke. De Weryha-Wysoczański-Pietrusiewicz is a former Delegate to the European Commission of the Nobility in Paris. Per reviews listed on his own website, reviewers of his book Strategien des Privaten noted that it has a “wise central idea” and that it “gives important food for thought”. In 2016 he published a memoir entitled A Chevalier from Poland.

Thanks to a generous handicap, he came second in the President's Race 2015 on the Cresta Run, in St. Moritz having also been a member of the Cambridge University Cresta Team in 1999.

== Selected publications ==
- A Chevalier from Poland. The Memoirs of Chevalier Rafael de Weryha-Wysoczański, Kibworth Beauchamp 2016, ISBN 978-1-7858-9161-8.
- Deutsches Adelsblatt, No. 10, October 15, 2002 (Contributor).
- Genealogisches Handbuch des Adels, Adelige Häuser XXX, vol 145, Limburg an der Lahn 2008 (Contributor), ISBN 978-3-7980-0845-8.
- Genealogisches Handbuch des Adels, Adelslexikon XVI, vol 137, Limburg an der Lahn 2005 (Contributor), ISBN 3-7980-0837-X.
- Genealogisches Handbuch des Adels, Adelslexikon XVII, Nachträge, vol 144, Limburg an der Lahn 2008 (Contributor), ISBN 978-3-7980-0844-1.
- Gothaisches Genealogisches Handbuch, Adelige Häuser IV, vol 8, Marburg 2018 (Contributor), ISBN 978-3-9817243-7-0.
- Jan de Weryha: The Monograph, Toruń; Hamburg 2026 (Editor, Contributor, Translator), ISBN 978-83-64232-77-0.
- Komposition als Kommunikation. Zur Musik des 20. Jahrhunderts. Festschrift Professor Peter Petersen, Frankfurt; Berlin; Bern; Bruxelles; New York; Oxford; Wien 2000 (Contributor), ISBN 3-631-36745-7.
- St. Moritz Tobogganing Club, Annual Report, No. 95, 2014-2015 (Contributor).
- Strategien des Privaten. Zum Landschaftspark von Humphry Repton und Fürst Pückler, Berlin 2004, ISBN 3-86504-056-X.
