= Za Ukrainu =

Song by Sokoly
- Language: Ukrainian
- English title: "For Ukraine"
- Released: 1917
- Genre: Patriotic song
- Composer: Yaroslav Yaroslavenko
- Lyricist: Mykola Voronyi

"Za Ukrainu" (Ukrainian: За Україну, lit. 'For Ukraine') is a Ukrainian patriotic song. In 1991 was a candidate to be adopted as the anthem of Ukraine.

== Creation ==
External videos
- "Za Ukrainu" song performed by Ukrainian musicians
- Chorea Kozacky
- Veryovka ensemble

=== Text ===
The song was written by Mykola Voronyi, a prominent Ukrainian poet, civil activist, politician, and one of the founders of the Central Rada. Voronyi was from a former serf-peasant family and was eventually murdered by the Soviet regime as a socially dangerous element. He was posthumously rehabilitated by the Kirovohrad Oblast Court.

Voronyi's text was first published in 1917 in the Kyiv newspaper Narodna Volia ("People's Freedom"), an organ of the Ukrainian Socialist-Revolutionary Party, which supported the course of achieving political autonomy for Ukraine taken by the Central Rada. The text contains revolutionary motives such as breaking of chains, struggle for popular freedom and brotherhood of nations. The latter one was especially actual for Ukrainians, who had to fight each other as parts of the Austro-Hungarian and Russian armies.

Voronyi's poem soon crossed the frontline, and became popular among Ukrainian soldiers in Austria-Hungary. This could have been a result of fraternization between soldiers on both sides of the front, during the course of which servicemen from opposing sides would exchange newspapers. It is known that such occurrences were widespread during April 1917 in the vicinity of Berezhany, where positions of opposing armies were located especially close to each other. As a result, less than six months after the original publication, Voronyi's poem was printed in a calendar issued by the Ukrainian Sich Riflemen and in a newspaper published by the Union for the Liberation of Ukraine in Vienna.

=== Music ===
In 1922 Voronyi's poem was for the first time published with notes, without mention of the composer, as part of a collection of songs performed by the 1st Galician Corps of the Ukrainian Galician Army, which had fought at the frontlines of the Polish-Ukrainian War. Two similar melodies on a lyrics by Mykola Voronyi "For Ukraine!" were created by Lviv composers Bohdan Vakhnianyn (1886-1940) and Yaroslav Yaroslavenko (1880-1958). The melody performed nowadays slightly differs from both of them.

== Later history ==
The song was popular among soldiers of the Ukrainian Army in the struggle against the Soviets. During the early 1990s it was popularized by the Ukrainian folk-band Sokoly led by Ivan Matsyalko from Lviv Oblast. The song also is considered to be an unofficial alternative Ukrainian anthem. In 1991 it was included into the official school curriculum in Ukraine. It is traditionally performed during official events and on solemn occasions.

== Lyrics ==
=== Pre-2003 lyrics ===
Ukrainian original

За Україну
З огнем завзяття
Рушаймо, браття,
Всі вперед!
Слушний час
Кличе нас —
Ну ж бо враз
Сповнять святий наказ!

Приспів:
За Україну,
За її долю,
За честь і волю,
За народ!

Ганебні пута
Ми вже порвали
І зруйнували
Царський трон,
З-під ярем
І з тюрем,
Де був гніт,
Ми йдем на вільний світ!

Приспів

О, Україно!
О, рідна Ненько!
Тобі вірненько
Присягнем.
Серця кров
І любов —
Все тобі
Віддати в боротьбі!

Приспів

Вперед же, браття!
Наш прапор має,
І сонце сяє
Нам в очах!
Дружний тиск,
Зброї блиск,
В серці гнів
І з ним свобідний спів:

Приспів

Ukrainian Latin alphabet

Za Ukrainu
Z ohnem zavziattia,
Rušajmo, brattia,
Vsi vpered!
Slušnyj čas
Klyče nas -
Nu ž bo vraz
Spovniať sviatyj nakaz!

Pryspiv:
Za Ukrainu,
Za ii doliu,
Za česť i voliu,
Za narod!

Hanebni puta
My vže porvaly
I zrujnuvaly
Carśkyj tron,
Z-pid jarem
I z tiurem,
De buv hnit
My jdem na viľnyj svit!

Pryspiv

O, Ukraino!
O, ridna Neńko!
Tobi virneńko
Prysiahnem.
Sercia krov
I liubov -
Vse tobi
Viddaty v boroťbi!

Pryspiv

Vpered že, brattia!
Naš prapor maje,
I sonce siaje
Nam v očach!
Družnyj tysk,
Zbroi blysk,
V serci hniv
I z nym svobidnyj spiv:

Pryspiv

English translation

For Ukraine
With fierce tenacity
Let's move, oh brothers,
All ahead.
The right time
Calls for us -
Now, let's at once
Fulfill the sacred will!

Chorus:
For our Ukraine,
For her fate,
For honor and freedom,
For the people!

The shameful bonds
We all have torn
as well we ruined,
The Tsarist's throne.
From under yokes
And out of jails -
Where was oppression
We enter a free world!

Chorus

Oh, Ukraine,
Oh, native Mother!
To you we loyally
Here swear.
Of heart blood
And its love -
All to you
We're pledging in the fight!

Chorus

Then, charge, oh brothers!
Our banner's waving,
And sun is shining
into our eyes!
Collective press,
Weapon's shine -
the heart's full of wrath
And with it the freedom's chant:

Chorus

== See also ==
- State Anthem of Ukraine
- Prayer for Ukraine
