= Mykola Voronyi =

Ukrainian writer, director and actor (1871–1938)

- Микола Кіндратович Вороний
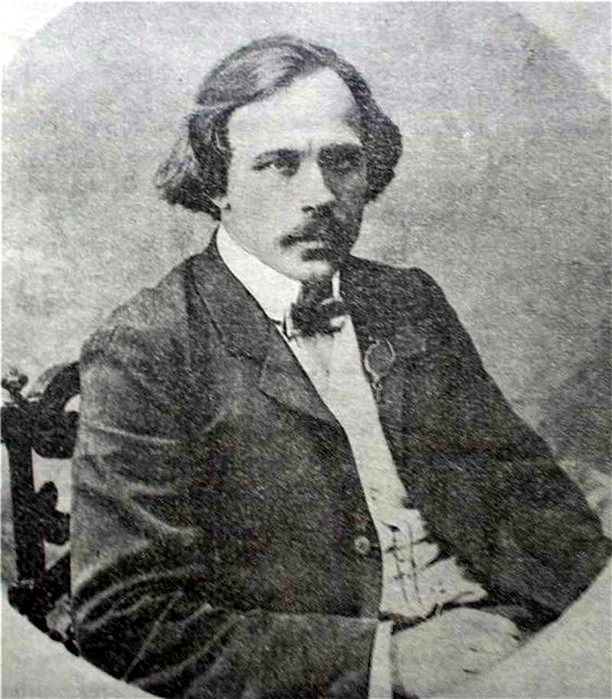
- Born: 6 December 1871; Rostov-on-Don, Russian Empire
- Died: 6 June 1938 (aged 66); Odesa, Ukrainian SSR, Soviet Union (now Ukraine)
- Education: Lviv University; Vienna University
- Occupations: poet, actor, director, critic
- Children: Marko Voronyi
- Writing career
- Language: Ukrainian
- Period: 1895-1930
- Movement: Modernism

Signature
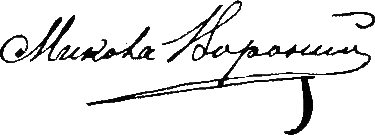

Mykola Kindratovych Voronyi (Ukrainian: Мико́ла Кіндра́тович Ворони́й, pronounced [mɪˈkɔlɐ kinˈdrɑtowɪtʃ woroˈnɪj]; 6 December 1871 – 7 June 1938) was a Ukrainian writer, poet, actor, director, and political activist.

== Biography ==
Voronyi was born in Rostov-on-Don and grew up in the Yekaterinoslav Governorate. Studying in Kharkiv, he was arrested for his political activities and spent three years under police suprevision. Later Voronyi emigrated, living and studying in Lviv and Vienna. In 1895 he started working as director at the Ruska Besida Theatre in Lviv, and also created articles on the topics of theatre, arts and music. After returning to the Russian Empire in 1897, Voronyi acted in the troupes of Marko Kropyvnytskyi and Panas Saksahansky. In 1901 he abandoned his acting career and worked as a zemstvo official, journalist and theatre critic. Starting from 1910 Voronyi was an employee of Mykola Sadovskyi's theatre in Kyiv.

A longtime activist of the Revolutionary Ukrainian Party, Voronyi was a founding member of the Central Council of Ukraine. In 1917 he also became a founder of the National Exemplary Theatre. In 1918 Voronyi worked as a director, actor and head of literary department at the State People's Theatre. After emigrating in 1920, resided in Warsaw and later moved to Lviv, teaching drama and directing the local music academy. In 1925 he served as director of the Grotesque Theatre in Lviv.

After returning to Soviet Ukraine in 1926, Voronyi worked as head of literary departments at Kharkiv and Kyiv operas. He also taught at the Kharkiv Music and Drama Institute and worked as a translator at the All-Ukrainian Photo Cinema Administration. In 1934 he was arrested and sentenced to three years of exile in Voronezh on accusations of spying for Poland and promotion of Ukrainian nationalism. In 1937 Voronyi returned to Ukraine and settled in Kirovohrad Oblast, but was arrested once again soon thereafter. In 1938 he was executed in Odesa by the NKVD troika on made up accusations of belonging to a Ukrainian militarist and nationalist organization.

== Legacy ==
One of the first Ukrainian modernists, Voronyi presented the movement's manifesto in his 1903 article in the Literary-Scientific Herald. He opposed the realist lyricism of the Narodnik era and enriched Ukrainian poetry with urban and individualistic motives, working to increase its strophical and metrical variety. Voronyi's works were panned by critics for being superficial, promoting a "cult of beauty" and lacking original topics and images.

Voronyi is recognized as one of the founders of theatrical theory and criticism in Ukraine. He made a great contribution to the establishment of Ukrainian-language opera. Among his contributions in this sphere are libretto translations of The Love for Three Oranges by Sergei Prokofiev, Trilby by Aleksandr Yurasovsky and Carmen by Georges Bizet. He also translated into Ukrainian numerous songs, including The Internationale, Marseillaise and Warszawianka.

Among composers to whom Voronyi dedicated his critical works was Ostap Nyzhankivsky. His theoretical and critical oeuvre contributed to the development of Ukrainian theatre, among others exerting great influence on Les Kurbas and his Young Theatre. A collection of Voronyi's works was published in Kyiv in 1989.

== Works ==
"Нічого, нічого"
[Nothing, nothing]
Song by Mykola Lysenko based on lyrics by Voronyj (1:01)

=== Poetry collections ===
- Lyrical poems (Ліричні поезії, 1912)
- In Glow of Dreams (В сяйві мрій, 1913)
- For Ukraine (За Україну, 1921)
- Poems (Поезії, Kharkiv, 1929)

=== Critical works ===
- Theatre and Drama (Театр і драма, Kyiv, 1913)
- With Brush and Quill (Пензлем і пером, Prague, 1923)
- Dramatical Primadonna (Драматична примадонна, Lviv, 1924) - dedicated to L.Linnytska
- Director (Режисер, Lviv, 1925)

== Family ==
Voronyi's son Marko (born in 1904 in Chernihiv) followed his steps as a poet. During the late 1920s his works were published in Lviv (under the pen name Marko Antiokh), and later also in Soviet Ukrainian magazines such as Chervonyi Shliakh. In 1935 Marko was arrested in Kyiv, and eventually sentenced to 8 years of concentration camps. He was executed on 3 November 1937 at Solovki.
