= Yaroslav Yaroslavenko =

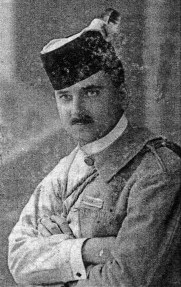

Yaroslav Yaroslavenko (Ukrainian: Ярослав Ярославенко), original surname Vintskovsky (Ukrainian: Вінцковський, Polish: Więckowski; March 30, 1880 – June 26, 1958) was a Ukrainian composer and conductor best known as author of music for the song Za Ukrainu.

Born in Lviv, Yaroslavenko was a son of Ukrainian writer and poet Dmytro Vintskovsky and Anna de Weryha-Wysoczańska-Pietrusiewicz. His original profession was railway engineer. He studied at the Lviv Conservatory from 1898 to 1900, and graduated with a degree in engineering from the Lviv Polytechnic Institute in 1904. He co-founded the Torban music publishing house in 1906 and was its director for over thirty years. Yaroslavenko managed several Ukrainian and Polish choirs and created numerous theartical and orchestra compositions, among them anthems of the Sokil and Plast societies, as well as choir and solo songs. He is also known for his arrangements of Sich Riflemen songs for the piano. He died in Lviv.

== Other notable works ==
Operettas:

- Volodus' (Володусь)
- In Alien Skin (В чужій шкірі)
- Wenches' Riot (Бабський бунт)

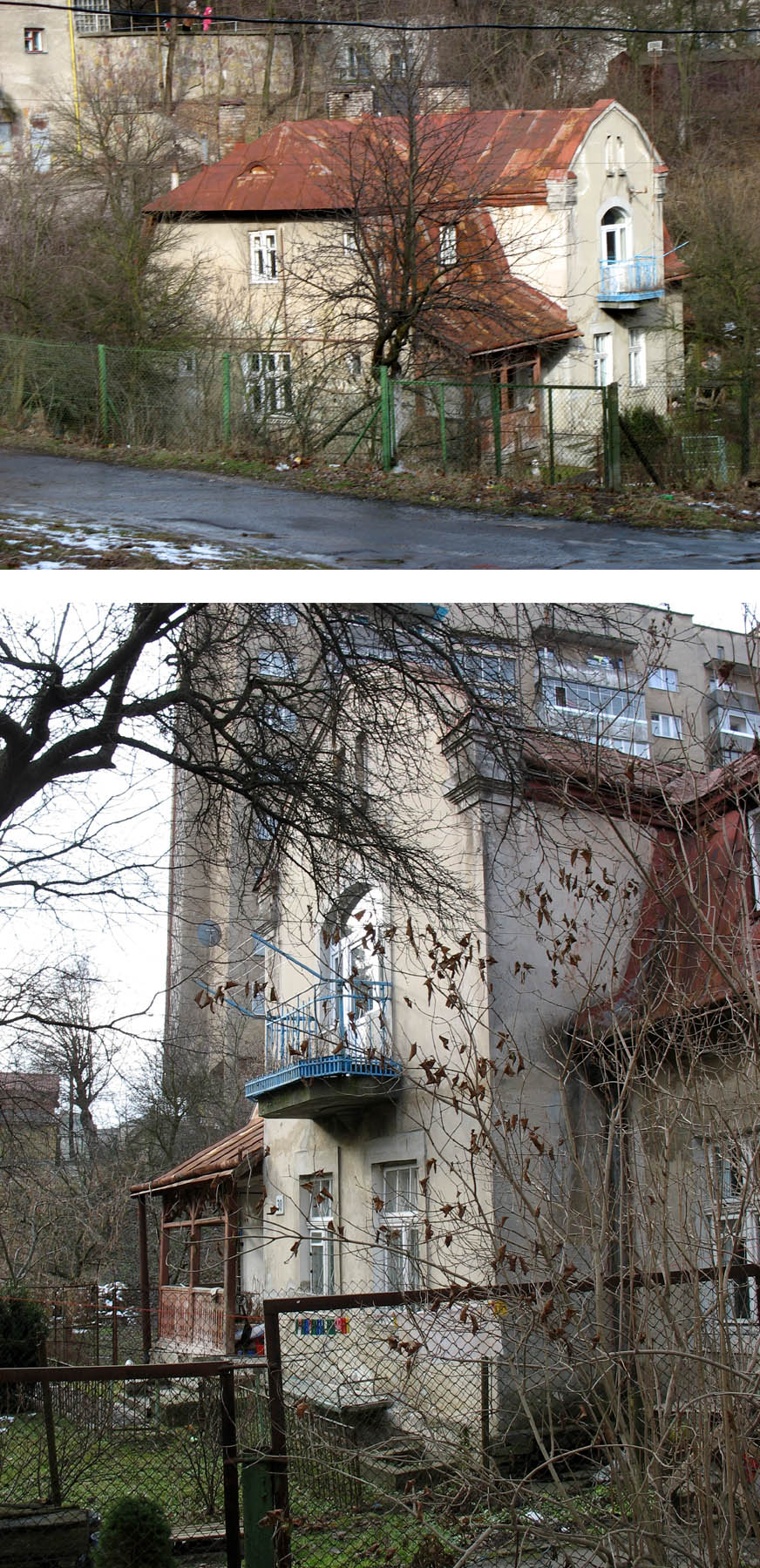
Yaroslavenko's house prior to being demolished

== Sources ==
- "Yaroslavenko, Yaroslav." Encyclopedia of Ukraine V [St-Z]. Toronto: University of Toronto Press, 2016.
- "Yaroslavenko, Yaroslav." in: Bernandt, G. and A. Dolzhanskiĭ. Sovetskie Kompozitory: Kratkiĭ Biograficheskiĭ Spravochnik. Moskva: Sovetskiĭ Kompozitor, 1957.
