= Timpani concerto =

Musical work for ensemble that is centered around the timpani

A timpani concerto is piece of music written for timpani with orchestral or band accompaniment. It is usually in three parts or movements.

The first timpani concertos were written in the Baroque and Classical periods of music. Important concertos from these eras include Johann Fischer's Symphony for Eight Timpani and Georg Druschetzky's Concerto for Six Timpani. During the Romantic Period, the timpani concerto was largely ignored. The timpani concerto was revived in the 20th century and the timpani concerto repertoire increased significantly.

Timpani concerto set-ups can range anywhere from a normal set of 4(32", 29", 26", 23") to 16+ Drums, some of which are smaller than 20" or larger than 32".

== List ==
- Johann Christian Fischer
  - Symphony for Eight Obbligato Timpani (probably 1780s), first known concerto for timpani
- Georg Druschetzky
  - Concerto for Six Timpani and Orchestra (1790s)
- Christoph Graupner
  - Symphony for 2 horns, timpani and strings
- Werner Thärichen
  - Timpani Concerto Op. 34 (1954)
- William Kraft
  - Concerto No. 1 for Timpani and Orchestra (1984)
  - Concerto No. 2 for Timpani and Orchestra ("The Grand Encounter") (2005)
- Gordon Jacob
  - Concerto for Timpani & Band (1984)
- Kurt Schwertsik
  - Timpani Concerto (1987-88)
- James Oliverio
  - Timpani Concerto No. 1 (The Olympian) (1990)
  - Dynasty (double timpani concerto) (2011)
- Mauricio Kagel
  - Konzertstück for Timpani and Orchestra (1990-92)
- Philip Glass
  - Concerto Fantasy for Two Timpanists and Orchestra (2000)
- Russell Peck
  - Concerto for Timpani and Orchestra (Harmonic Rhythm) (2000)
- Russell Peterson
  - Concerto for Timpani and Orchestra (2002)
- Michael Daugherty
  - Raise the Roof (2003)
- Ney Rosauro
  - Concerto for Timpani and Orchestra (2003)
- James Boznos
  - Concerto for Timpani, Roto-toms and Orchestra op.7 (2003)
  - Concerto Nr.2 “Pavilions” op. 20, for extended timpani, orchestra and mp3 (2019)
- Lee Actor
  - Concerto for Timpani and Orchestra (2005)
- Jeff Tyzik
  - Concerto for Timpani (2009)
- John Psathas
  - Planet Damnation for timpani and orchestra (2012)
- Kalevi Aho
  - Concerto for Timpani and Orchestra (2015)
- Marcus Paus
  - Concerto for Timpani and Orchestra (2015)
- Nick Woud
  - Timpani Concerto (Concerto Lirico) (2020)
- Thierry Deleruyelle
  - Timpuma, concerto for Timpani and Band (2023)
