= Hate Songs for Mezzo-Soprano and Orchestra =

Song cycle based on Dorothy Parker's poems

- by Marcus Paus
- Composed: 2013–2014

Hate Songs for Mezzo-Soprano and Orchestra, or simply Hate Songs, is an operatic song cycle for mezzo-soprano and orchestra by Norwegian composer Marcus Paus based on poetry by American poet Dorothy Parker. Paus' Hate Songs was published in 2014, and was included on Tora Augestad's and the Oslo Philharmonic's album Portraying Passion: Works by Weill/Paus/Ives (2018) with works by Paus, Kurt Weill and Charles Ives; it has received critical acclaim and was awarded the Spellemannprisen (Norwegian Grammy Award) for 2018 in the Classical class.

Paus' Hate Songs is based on the poem "Women: A Hate Song" published by Parker in Vanity Fair in 1916 and subsequent poems that have been described as "a photo-book of New York with the female caricatures that Parker abhorred or despised, notably idle bourgeois ladies, who were the object of patriarchal worship as angelic domestic creatures."

Professor of musicology Ralph P. Locke wrote that Paus' Hate Songs "proved to be one of the most engaging works" in recent years; "the cycle expresses Parker's favorite theme: how awful human beings are, especially the male of the species." Locke highlighted Augestad's recording of Hate Songs as one of the "best opera and vocal music" works in that year.

Albrecht Thiemann, editor of Opernwelt, called the work "a captivatingly orchestrated, spirit-sparkling opus" and "a coup that provides an immense listening pleasure. With this work, Paus highlights a woman hardly known in Europe who attacked the social roles and conventions of her time with pointed sarcasm: the New York writer and critic Dorothy Parker (1893–1967). One of her best works is a series of lyrically rhapsodizing, caustically comical swear prose in which she settles accounts of all kinds with personal objects of hatred. For example the polymorphic narcissistic 'man' figure that you encountered in metropolitan everyday life of the early 20th century."

== Discography ==
- Tora Augestad and the Oslo Philharmonic, Portraying Passion: Works by Weill/Paus/Ives, LAWO Classics, 2018
