= Slava Ukraini! (song) =

2022 song by Marcus Paus

- by Marcus Paus
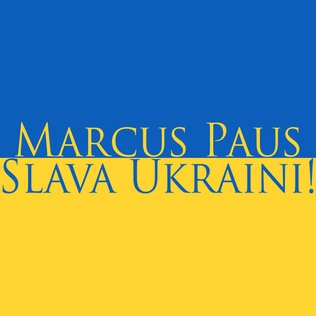
- English: Glory to Ukraine!
- Native name: Слава Україні!
- Genre: Song
- Composed: February 2022
- Performed: 1 March 2022: Norway
- Published: 27 February 2022: NRK, Norway
- Povilas Syrrist-Gelgota, viola, and Oslo Philharmonic

Slava Ukraini! (Ukrainian: Слава Україні!, lit. 'Glory to Ukraine!') is a 2022 song composed by the Norwegian composer Marcus Paus. It is based on the worldwide use of the expression "Glory to Ukraine" (Ukrainian: Слава Україні, romanized: Slava Ukraini) as a symbol of resistance and solidarity during the 2022 Russian invasion, and is loosely inspired by a motif from the opening of the national anthem of Ukraine.

== History ==
It was released on 27 February 2022, was recorded two days later by Lithuanian-Norwegian viola player Povilas Syrrist-Gelgota of the Oslo Philharmonic, and was broadcast shortly afterwards by the Norwegian government broadcaster, NRK, and performed at a peace concert in support of Ukraine at the Norwegian Academy of Music. The work was also featured in a program on LRT on 8 March 2022. Furthermore, the work is featured at SOS Children's Villages' and UNICEF Norway's solidarity concert "Together for the Children of Ukraine" in the Atrium of the University of Oslo, a traditional venue of Nobel Peace Prize ceremonies.

Paus has described the work as a song of resistance and said that "the work seems to strike a chord with many people, including those who are in the middle of the battle zone. There is no nobler task for music than to unite and comfort people." Shortly before writing the work, Paus was commissioned by the Norwegian Armed Forces to write a major "identity-building and unifying" work for the armed forces, the largest commission in the history of Norwegian military music. Paus, who is partly of Jewish descent, was also commissioned by the Government of Norway to write the choral work The Beauty That Still Remains, based on Anne Frank's diary, for the official Norwegian 70th anniversary of the end of the Second World War.

== Discography ==
- Povilas Syrrist-Gelgota (Oslo Philharmonic), Slava Ukraini!, NRK, 2022
