= Slava Ukraini =

Ukrainian national salute

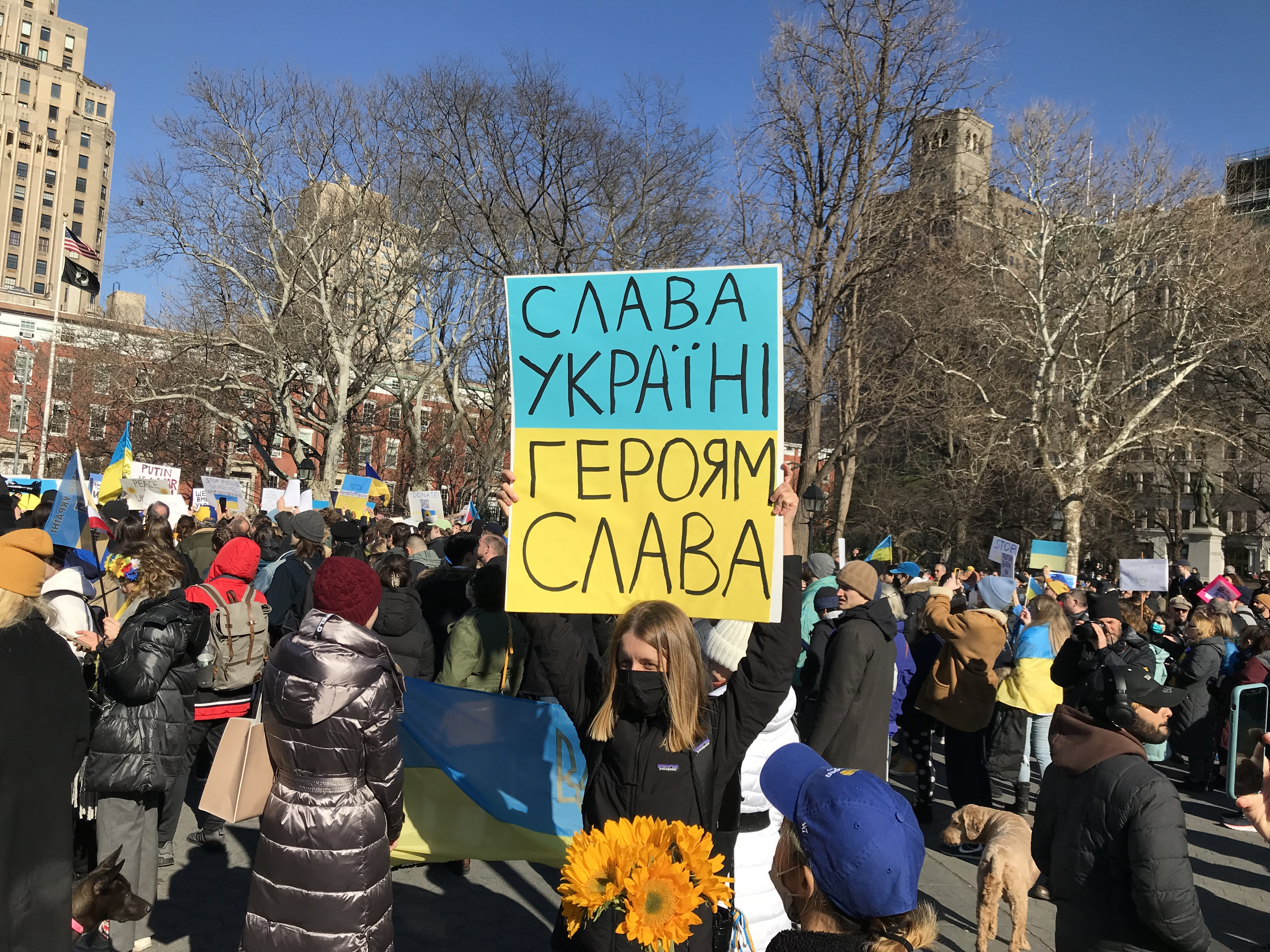
A protester in New York City on 27 February 2022, holding a sign that reads "Glory to Ukraine! Glory to the heroes!". The phrase gained worldwide prominence as a result of the Russian invasion of Ukraine.

"Glory to Ukraine!" (Ukrainian: Слава Україні!, romanized: Slava Ukraini! [ˈslɑwɐ ʊkrɐˈjin⁽ʲ⁾i]; Russian: Слава Украине!, romanized: Slava Ukraine!) is a Ukrainian national salute, known as a symbol of Ukrainian sovereignty and resistance to foreign aggression. It is the battle cry of the Armed Forces of Ukraine. It is often accompanied by the response "To the heroes – glory!" (Ukrainian: Героям слава!, romanized: Heroiam slava! [ɦeˈrɔjɐm ˈslɑwɐ]; Russian: Героям слава!, romanized: Geroyam slava!).

The phrase first appeared at the beginning of the 20th century in different variations, when it became popular among Ukrainians during the Ukrainian War of Independence from 1917 to 1921. The response "Glory to the heroes!" first appeared during the Ukrainian War of Independence or later in the 1920s among members of the League of Ukrainian Nationalists. In the 1930s, it became widespread as a slogan of the Organization of Ukrainian Nationalists (OUN), as well as Ukrainian diaspora groups and refugee communities in the West during the Cold War. In the Soviet Union, the phrase was forbidden. The phrase eventually resurfaced in Ukraine during the country's struggle for independence in connection with the fall of the Soviet Union. Its use was revived again during the 2014 Ukrainian revolution and the Russo-Ukrainian War, during which it became a widely popular symbol in Ukraine.

The phrase has gained worldwide attention during the ongoing Russian invasion of Ukraine and has subsequently been used in protests in support of Ukraine around the world. It has been used in speeches by Ukrainian politicians like President Volodymyr Zelenskyy, as well as numerous foreign leaders.

== History ==
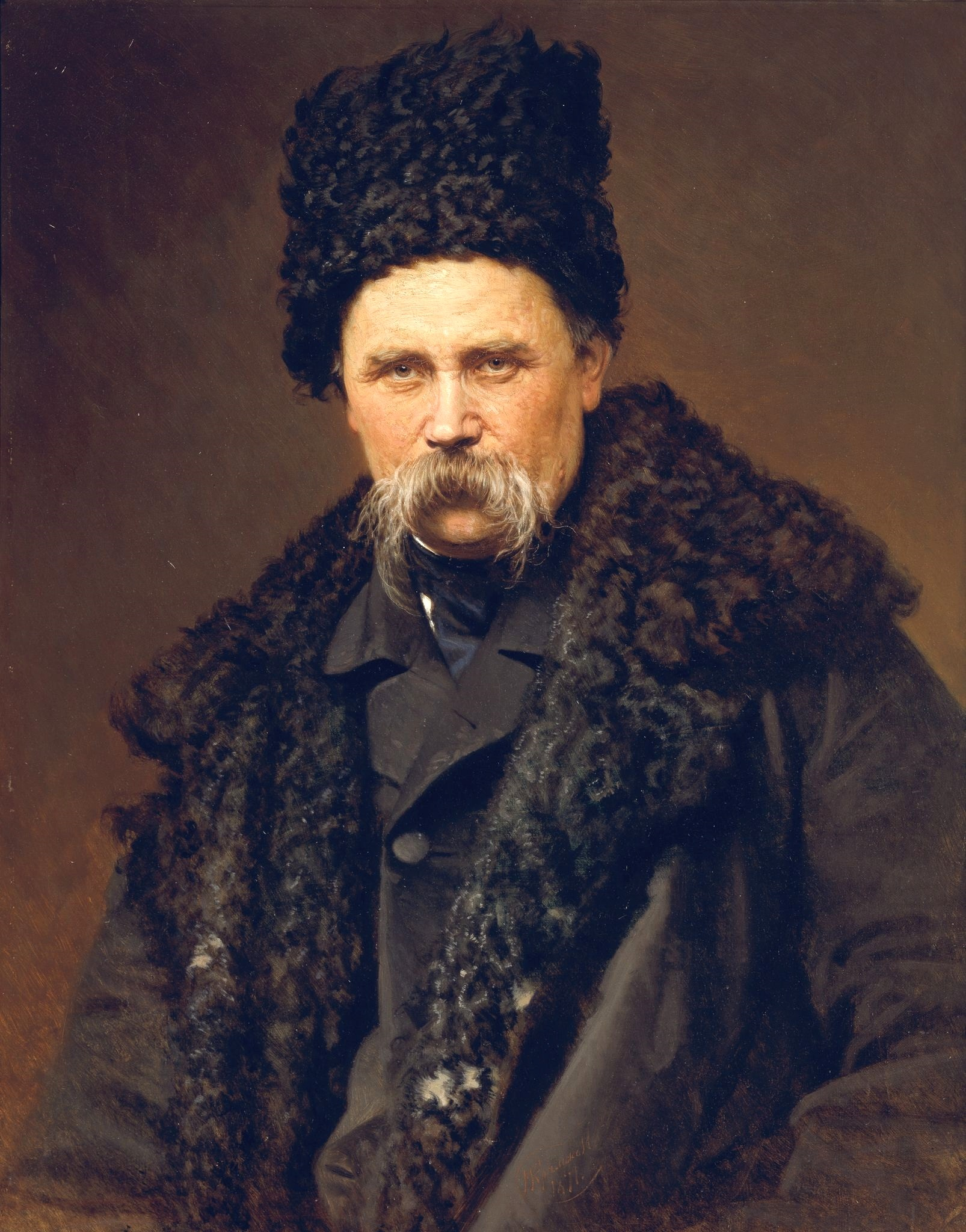
Ukrainian poet Taras Shevchenko used the phrase in the form "Glory of Ukraine" in an 1840 poem.

=== Origins ===
Ukrainian historians argue that the greeting has its roots in Taras Shevchenko’s works. In his 1840 poem To Osnovianenko, Shevchenko used the phrase "Glory of Ukraine":

English translation:

Our thought, our song
Will not die, will not perish…
Oh there, people, is our glory,
Glory of Ukraine!

Original Ukrainian text:

Наша дума, наша пісня
Не вмре, не загине...
От де, люде, наша слава,
Слава України!

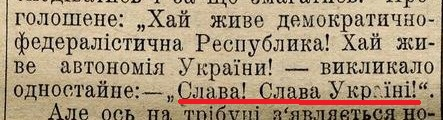
Records of the 15 March 1917 Rada "in support of a democratic and independent Ukraine", from the journal "Nowa Rada". The phrase Glory to Ukraine is underlined.

However the first known use of the phrase "Glory to Ukraine!" as a greeting with the response "Glory all around the world!" (Ukrainian: По всій землі слава, Po vsiy zemli slava) occurred within the Ukrainian student community of the late 19th to early 20th centuries in Kharkiv.

=== Ukrainian War of Independence (1917–1921) ===
The phrase was popularised during the Ukrainian War of Independence (from 1917 to 1921). During this period, the slogan "Glory to Ukraine!", as well as the similar ones like "Long live Ukraine!" could be heard often at patriotic gatherings and demonstrations within Ukraine, as well as among the diaspora. According to historian Yana Prymachenko it was used in the army of the Ukrainian People's Republic by the regiment of the Black Zaporozhians, commanded by Petro Dyachenko, in the form: "Glory to Ukraine!" – "Glory to the Cossacks!", as well as by other military formations with a variety of different responses. After the coup d'état and the assumption of power by Hetman Pavlo Skoropadskyi, the response in the Ukrainian army loyal to Hetmanate was "Glory to Hetman!". The status of the slogan in the army of the UPR was formalised on 19 April 1920, when, under an order of Commander-in-Chief Mykhailo Omelianovych-Pavlenko regulating drill rules in the army, soldiers were obliged to respond "Glory to Ukraine!" when receiving praise or thanks for their service to the homeland.

Insurgents fighting in Kholodny Yar, the last bastion of Ukrainian anti-Soviet resistance in 1919–22, also used a similar salute. According to Yakiv Vodianyi's memoirs published in 1928, it was: "Glory to Ukraine!" and the reply "Eternal glory!". And according to Yuriy Horlis-Horskyi's memoirs published in 1933, the insurgents greeted each other by saying "Glory to Ukraine!" and responding with the same.

=== Interwar period ===
The tradition of greeting each other using "Glory to Ukraine!" was continued by veterans of the Ukrainian army in exile. The Ukrainian National Cossack Association (UNAKOTO), operating in Germany, under the leadership of a former associate of Hetman Skoropadsky, Ivan Poltavets-Ostryanitsa, established on 10 July 1925 a new salute obligatory for members of the organization: "Glory to Ukraine!" – "Glory to Cossacks!".

"Glory to Ukraine!" was also commonly used by Ukrainian nationalists in the 1920s and 1930s. In 1930s it became widespread as a slogan of the Ukrainian Military Organisation (UVO), and later Organization of Ukrainian Nationalists (OUN). According to press reports, during the trials of OUN members after the assassination of Bronisław Pieracki, the accused performed fascist-style salutes to the words "Glory to Ukraine!". At the Second Grand Congress of the OUN on 27 August 1939 in Rome, the response "Glory to the leader!", who was then Andriy Melnyk, was officially adopted, but it was in use since at least 1929 by the members of UVO.

"Glory to Ukraine!" also emerged as a greeting among members of the Ukrainian scout organization Plast, where it gradually supplanted the original greeting "SKOB!", in the form: "Glory to Ukraine!" – "Glory, Glory, Glory!" This greeting is still used by members of Plast today. Many members of Plast belonged as well to the OUN, which contributed to the popularity of the greeting.

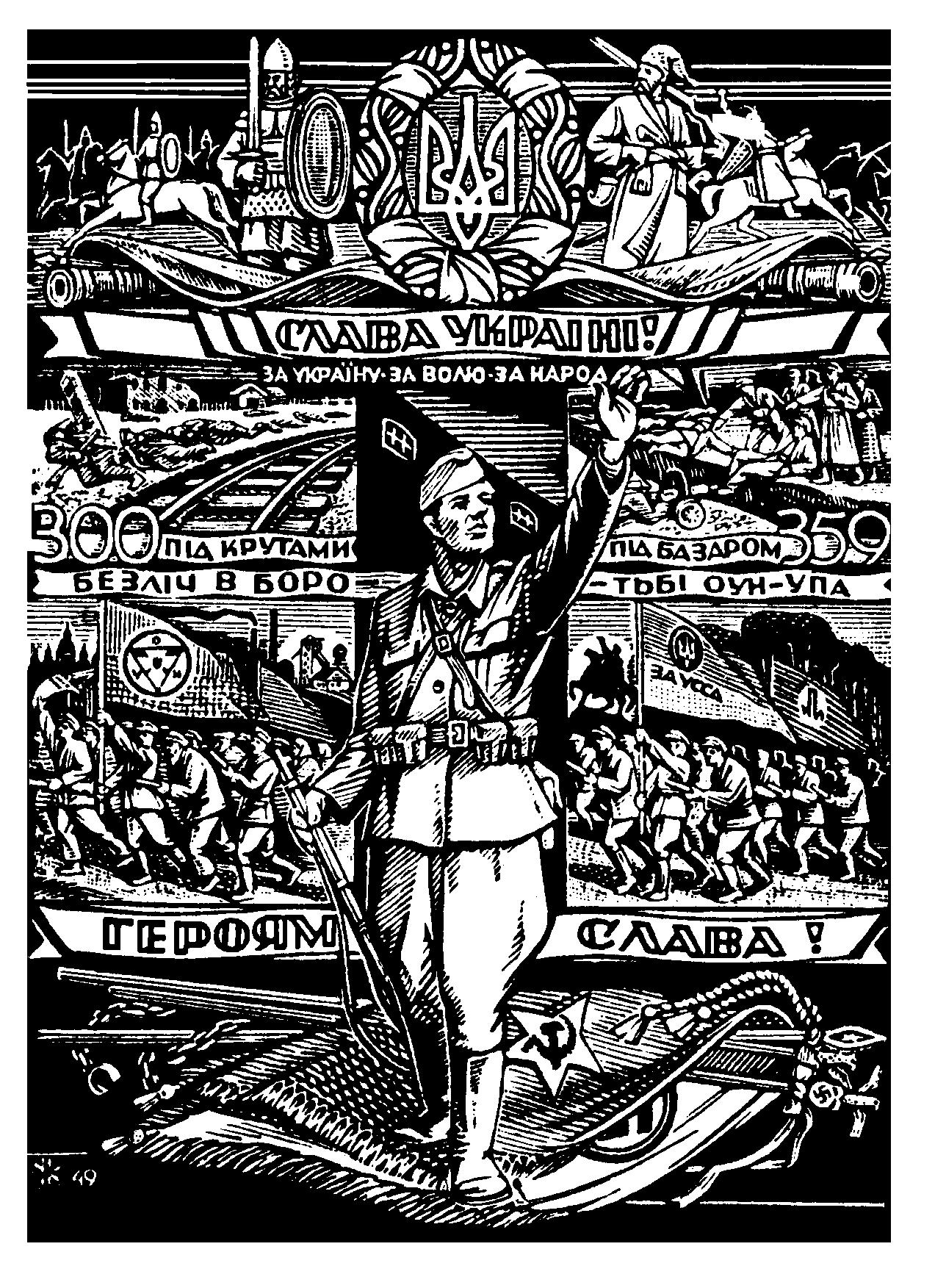
UPA propaganda poster. OUN-UPA's formal greeting is written in Ukrainian on two of the horizontal lines: "Glory to Ukraine—Glory to the Heroes".

According to Yana Prymachenko the response "Glory to the heroes!" (Heroiam slava!) was in use already in years 1917–1921, during the Ukrainian war of independence. In Petro Dyachenko's memoirs, it is reported that at a meeting of the Legion of Ukrainian Nationalists (LUN), which was active in 1925–29, Yuriy Artyushenko proposed to adopt the Black Zaporozhians salute "Glory to Ukraine!" – "Glory to the Cossacks!". This proposal was accepted with a change of response to the more universal "Glory to the heroes!". However, in the memoirs of Artyushenko himself, there is no such information, but there is a mention of the acceptance of the greeting "Glory to Ukraine!" and the response "Glory to Ukraine, Glory!".

=== Second World War ===
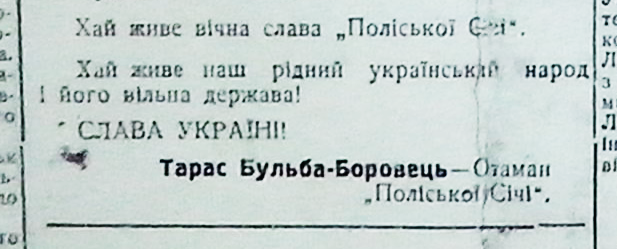
Fragment of Polissian Sich's press organ called "Haidamaka", 16 November 1941. Translation: Long live the eternal glory of the "Polissian Sich". Long live our native Ukrainian nation and its free state! Glory to Ukraine! Taras Bulba-Borovets – ataman of the "Polissian Sich".

During the German occupation of Poland after September 1939, Ukrainian organisations were able to develop extensive activities. OUN activists were involved in the work of the Ukrainian Central Committee and its local branches. After a time, this contributed to the development of national consciousness among many Ukrainians in the General Government and the spread of the OUN greeting. In July 1940, a Ukrainian observer from the Włodawa area noted: We have not yet seen in our lives such an educated, so organised rural youth. Every child who passed by us raised his hand and greeted: "Glory to Ukraine".

In April 1941 in German-occupied Kraków, the younger part of the OUN seceded and formed its own organisation, called the OUN-B after its leader Stepan Bandera. The group adopted a fascist-style salute along with calling "Glory to Ukraine!" and responding with "Glory to the Heroes!". During the failed attempt to build a Ukrainian state on lands occupied by Germany after its invasion of the Soviet Union in June 1941, triumphal arches with "Glory to Ukraine!", along with other slogans, were erected in numerous Ukrainian cities. According to historian Grzegorz Rossoliński-Liebe, an observer recalled many ordinary Ukrainians abandoning the customary Christian greeting "Glory to Jesus Christ" (Slava Isusu Khrystu) in favour of the new OUN greeting. For this reason, Greek-Catholic Metropolitan Archbishop Andriy Sheptytskyi, criticised the OUN for the greeting. Created in the second half of 1942 by the OUN the Ukrainian Insurgent Army dropped the raising of the right arm above the head.

=== Soviet era and late 20th century ===
In the Soviet Union, the slogan "Slava Ukraini!" was forbidden and discredited via a decades-long propaganda campaign alongside the diaspora Ukrainian nationalists who used it. They were dubbed "Ukrainian bourgeois nationalists", "Banderites", and "Nazi henchmen" by Soviet authorities.

In the late 1980s and early 1990s, the slogan began to be heard at rallies and demonstrations. After Ukraine declared independence in 1991, the phrase "Glory to Ukraine!" became a common patriotic slogan. In 1995, President of the United States Bill Clinton used the phrase in a speech in Kyiv (together with "God bless America").

=== Russo-Ukrainian War ===
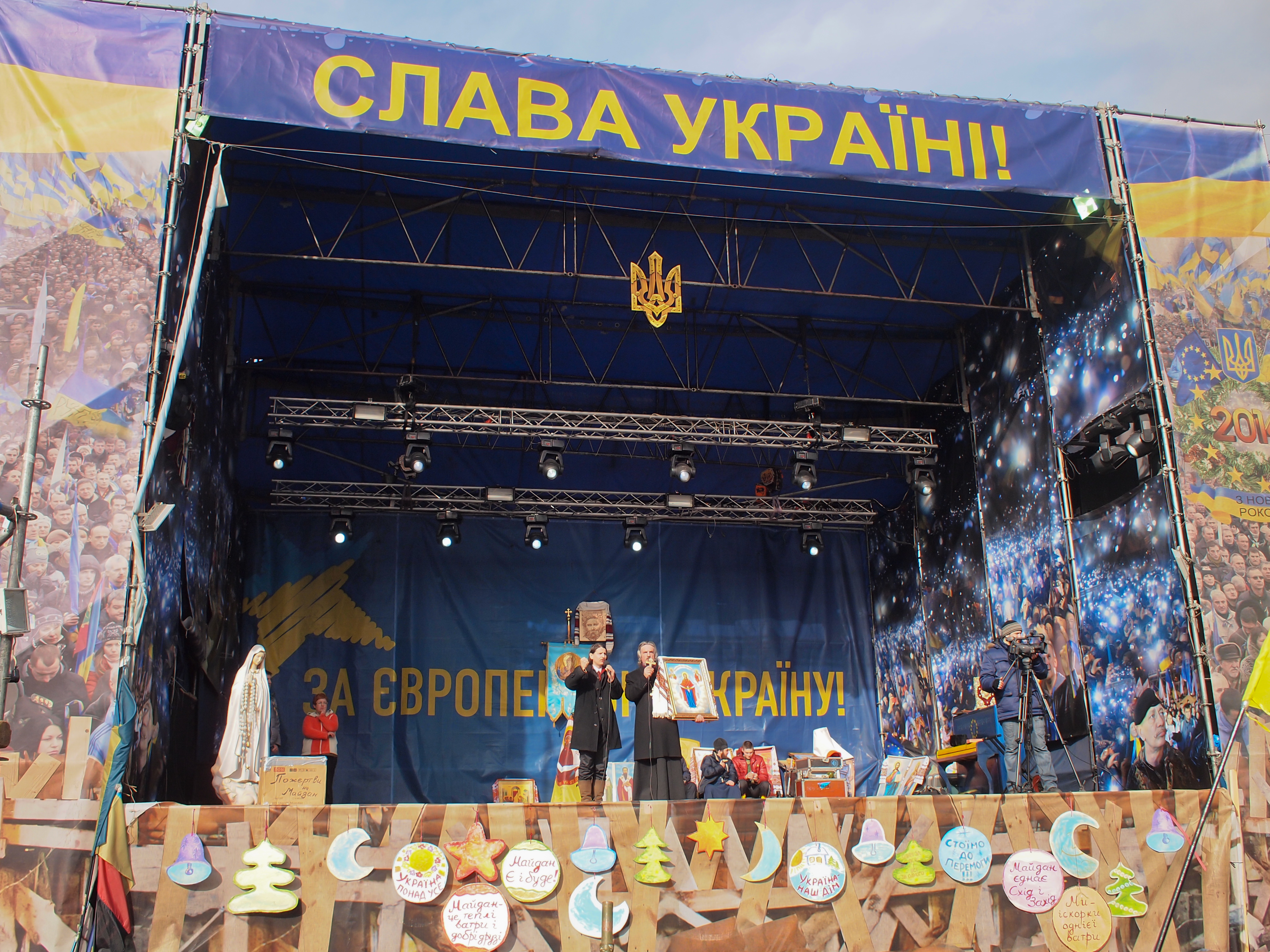
Stage on Independence square during Euromaidan, 19 February 2014

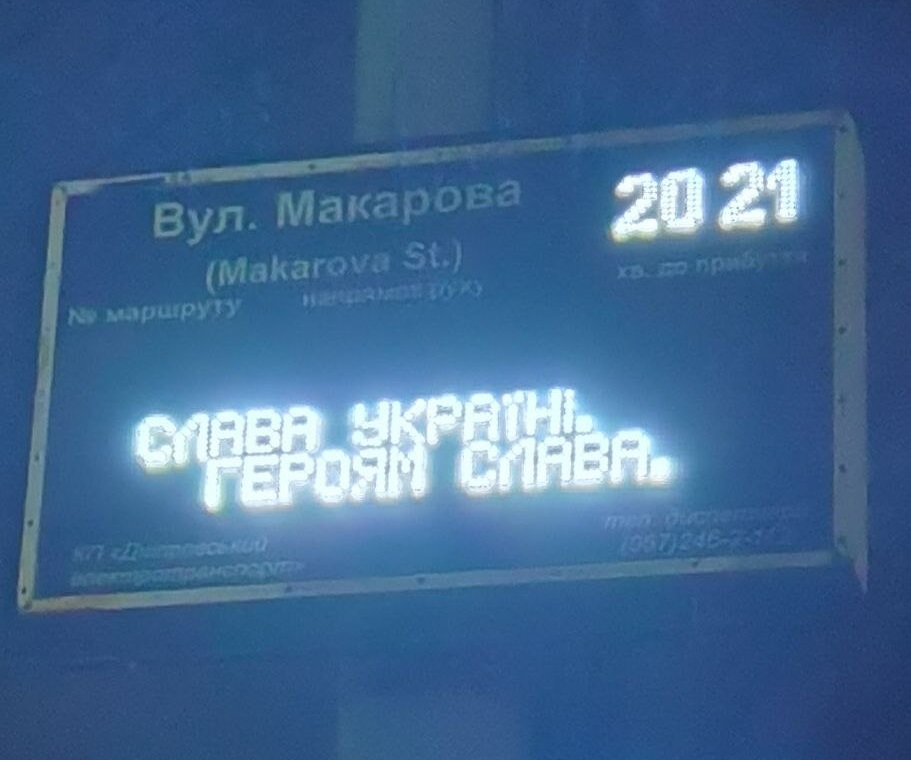
Slava Ukraini on bus stop stand, 2022

The phrase has undergone a resurgence in recent times, becoming a popular and prominent refrain during the 2014 Ukrainian revolution, and a symbol of democracy and of resistance against Putin's Russia following the Russian invasion of Ukraine. Andreas Umland in 2013 attributes the slogan's popularity to actor Yevhen Nyshchuk, who was a presenter at the Euromaidan podium and chanted the slogan. In his opinion, the presence of over-represented ethno-nationalist groups such as the Svoboda party, Congress of Ukrainian Nationalists, Ukrainian Platform Sobor and Right Sector also contributed to its spread among Euromaidan participants. Dr. Serhiy Kvit, former Minister of Education and Science of Ukraine, appeals to Umland that the slogan became popular not because "it was repeated countless times from the Maidan stage and not because of some campaign of ethnic superiority", but because of "its association with the defiant spirit of a struggle against all odds". Later, in 2017, Umland together with Yuliya Yurchuk writes that nationalist symbols during Euromaidan acquired new meaning – a reaction to Soviet and post-Soviet repression of Ukrainian culture and history. The greeting became the mourning for the Euromaidan victims. After war in Donbas started, Ukrainians greeted fighting and fallen Ukrainian soldiers with "Glory to Ukraine". Ukrainian-Canadian historian Serhy Yekelchyk writes that "the nationalist greeting from the 1940s [...] acquired new meaning on the Maidan", and that "when used by protestors, [the slogan] referred to a hoped-for democratic and pro-Western Ukraine and regarded as heroes those who had fallen in service to their cause."

According to political scientist Vyacheslav Likhachev, even variations that had far-right connotations lost that meaning during Euromaidan, for example, nearly every public speech, as well as public greetings began/ended with "Glory to Ukraine – glory to the heroes!" He noted that by the Equality March in 2021, the annual LGBTQ+ event in Kyiv, other variations like "Glory to the nation – death to the enemies!" were chanted by participants spontaneously. They had long become ubiquitous enough to lose any aggressive meaning.

On 9 August 2018, Ukrainian President Petro Poroshenko announced that "Glory to Ukraine!" would be the official greeting of the Armed Forces of Ukraine, replacing "Hello comrades" (Ukrainian: Вітаю товариші, romanized: Vitayu tovaryshi). The greeting was used during the Kyiv Independence Day Parade on 24 August 2018. The Ukrainian parliament approved the President's bill on this (in its first reading) on 6 September and on 4 October 2018. Parliament also made Glory to Ukraine the official greeting of the National Police of Ukraine.

The popularization of the phrase was sometimes controversial abroad. After Croatia's 2018 FIFA World Cup victory, Croatia's assistant coach was fined by the football governing body FIFA after posting a video in which he used the slogan. In response, on 10 July 2018, Ukrainian supporters flooded FIFA's Facebook page with over 158,000 comments, most saying "Glory to Ukraine!". Russia alleged that the chant has ultra-nationalist connotations. The Football Federation of Ukraine said in a statement that "'Glory to Ukraine' is a commonly used greeting in Ukraine," and that it "should not be interpreted as an act of aggression or provocation".

==== Russian invasion of Ukraine ====
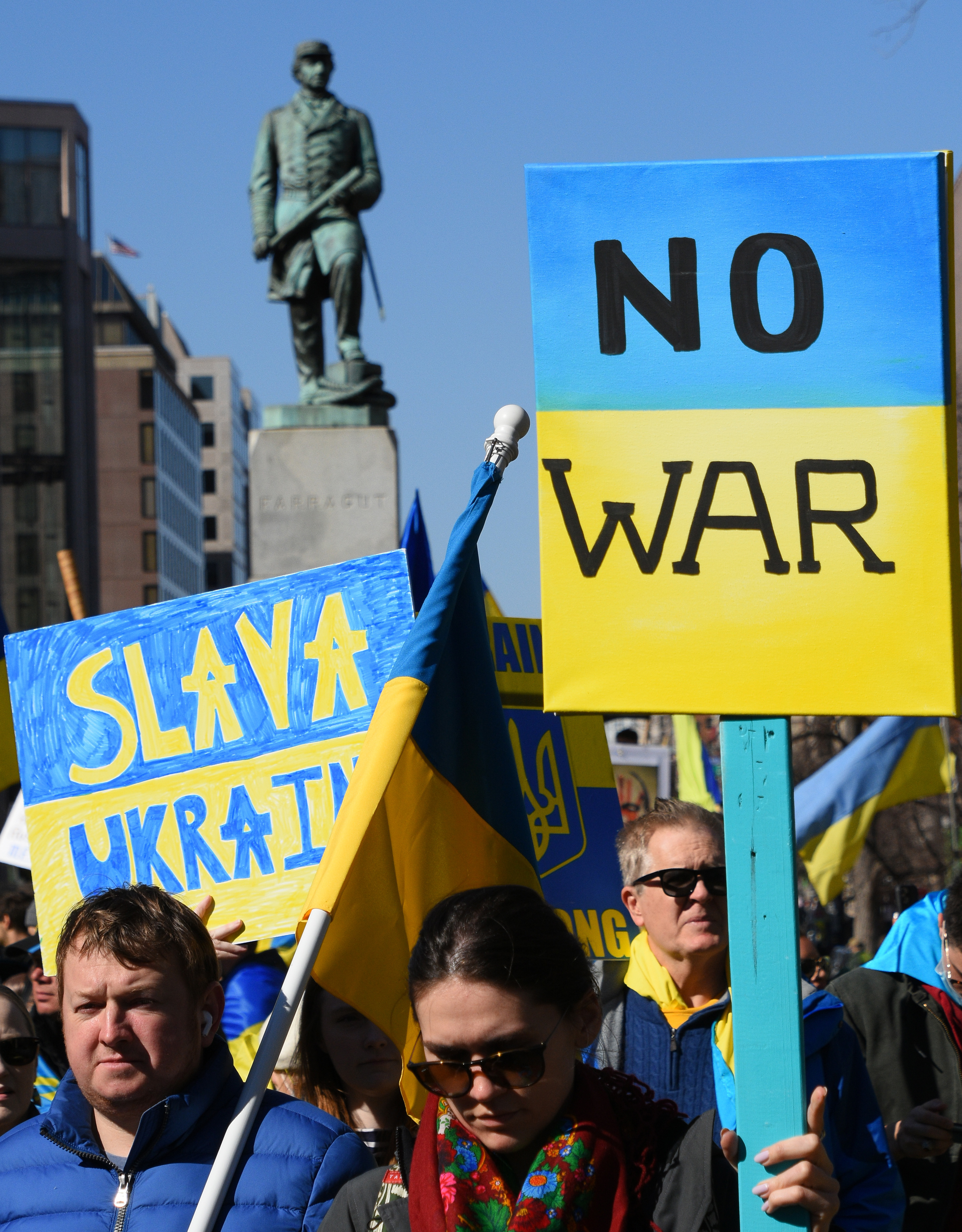
"Slava Ukraini" sign at an anti-war protest in Washington, D.C., 27 February 2022

This phrase became very popular among Ukrainian soldiers and their supporters to boost morale following the Russian invasion of Ukraine. The slogan has seen worldwide use by protesters in solidarity with Ukraine all over the world, accompanying various demands towards the Russian embassies and the relevant national governments such as excluding Russia from SWIFT and closing airspace over Ukraine.

It has been used in speeches by numerous Ukrainian politicians including President Volodymyr Zelenskyy. It has also been used by foreign leaders including European Commission President Ursula von der Leyen, former British Prime Minister Boris Johnson, former New Zealand Prime Minister Jacinda Ardern, former Dutch Prime Minister Mark Rutte, Croatian Prime Minister Andrej Plenković, former speaker of the US House of Representatives Nancy Pelosi and the former British Permanent Representative Barbara Woodward in a speech to the UN. It has been used by commentators and media such as The Times.

== Impact ==
=== Music ===
The Norwegian Armed Forces' official composer Marcus Paus composed the song "Slava Ukraini!," loosely inspired by Ukraine's national anthem. Paus released the work on Facebook on 27 February 2022 and described it as a song of resistance; it was recorded two days later by Lithuanian-Norwegian viola player Povilas Syrrist-Gelgota of the Oslo Philharmonic, and was broadcast shortly afterwards by the Norwegian government broadcaster, NRK. Paus said that "the work seems to strike a chord with many people, including those who are in the middle of the battle zone. There is no nobler task for music than to unite and comfort people."

Beyond Europe, the song "Glory to Hong Kong" drew inspiration from the slogan for use in the 2019–20 Hong Kong protests. The Chinese edition of Deutsche Welle named "Glory to Hong Kong" the "anthem" of the Hong Kong protests. Describing the song, Chinese Television System News in Taiwan noted that the song had "peaceful vocals coupled with scenes of bloody conflicts between Hong Kong Police and the people" and that by creating "Glory to Hong Kong", Hongkongers recorded their "history of struggling for democracy and freedom".

=== Commemorative currency ===
The 2 euro commemorative coin issued by the Bank of Estonia in 2022 features the words "Slava Ukraini" (Glory to Ukraine), which was designed by Daria Titova, a Ukrainian refugee studying at the Estonian Academy of Arts.

== See also ==
- Long Live Belarus!
- Czołem Wielkiej Polsce
- Liberate Hong Kong, revolution of our times

== Bibliography ==
- Lipovetsky, Sviatoslav (2010). Організація українських націоналістів (бандерівці): фрагменти діяльності та боротьби [The Organisation of Ukrainian Nationalists (Banderites): A Collage of Deeds and Struggles] (in Ukrainian).
- Rossoliński-Liebe, Grzegorz (2014). Stepan Bandera: The Life and Afterlife of a Ukrainian Nationalist: Fascism, Genocide, and Cult. Columbia University Press. ISBN 978-3838266848.
- Yermolenko, Volodymyr, ed. (2019). Re-Vision of History. Russian Historical Propaganda and Ukraine. Kyiv. ISBN 978-617-684-247-7.
- Zajączkowski, Mariusz (2015). Ukraińskie podziemie na Lubelszczyźnie w okresie okupacji niemieckiej 1939–1944 [Ukrainian underground in the Lublin region during the German occupation 1939–1944] (in Polish). Lublin-Warsaw.
