= Dorothy Parker =

American poet, writer, critic (1893–1967)

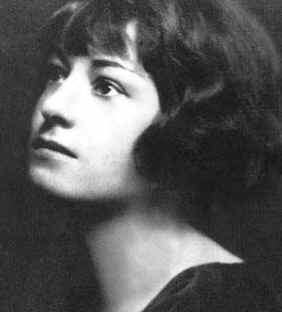
- Parker, c. 1910s–1920s
- Born: Dorothy Rothschild; August 22, 1893; Long Branch, New Jersey, U.S.
- Died: June 7, 1967 (aged 73); New York City, U.S.
- Resting place: Woodlawn Cemetery
- Occupations: Author; poet; critic; screenwriter
- Spouses: Edwin Pond Parker II (m. 1917; div. 1927) Alan Campbell (m. 1934; div. 1947) (m. 1950; died 1963)
- Writing career
- Genres: Poetry, satire, short stories, criticism, essays
- Notable works: Enough Rope, Sunset Gun, A Star Is Born
- Notable awards: O. Henry Award; 1929
- Movement: American modernism

Dorothy Parker (née Rothschild; August 22, 1893 – June 7, 1967) was an American poet, literary critic and writer of fiction. Based in New York, she was known for her caustic wisecracks, and eye for 20th-century urban foibles.

Parker rose to acclaim, both for her literary works published in magazines, such as The New Yorker, and for her role as a founding member of the Algonquin Round Table. In the early 1930s, Parker traveled to Hollywood to pursue screenwriting. Her successes there, including two Academy Award nominations, were curtailed when her involvement in left-wing politics resulted in her being placed on the Hollywood blacklist.

Dismissive of her own talents, she deplored her reputation as a "wisecracker". Nevertheless, both her literary output and reputation for sharp wit have endured. Some of her works have been set to music.

== Early life and education ==
Dorothy Parker, also known as 'Dot' or 'Dottie', was born Dorothy Rothschild in 1893, the youngest of four children of Jacob Henry Rothschild and his wife Elizabeth Annie (née Marston) (1851–1898), at 732 Ocean Avenue in Long Branch, New Jersey. Her mother was of Scottish descent. Her father was the son of Sampson Jacob Rothschild (1818–1899) and Mary Greissman (b. 1824), both Prussian-born Jews. Sampson Jacob Rothschild was a merchant who immigrated to the United States around 1846, settling in Monroe County, Alabama. Dorothy's father was one of five known siblings: Simon (1854–1908); Samuel (b. 1857); Hannah (1860–1911), later Mrs. William Henry Theobald; and Martin, born in Manhattan on December 12, 1865, who perished in the sinking of the Titanic in 1912.

Her mother died in Manhattan in July 1898, a month before Parker's fifth birthday. In 1900, her father married Eleanor Frances Lewis (1851–1903), a Protestant. Author Dorothy Herrmann claimed that Parker hated both her father, who allegedly physically abused her, and her stepmother, whom she refused to call "mother", "stepmother", or "Eleanor", instead referring to her as "the housekeeper". However, her biographer Marion Meade refers to this account as "largely false", stating that the atmosphere in which Parker grew up was indulgent, affectionate, supportive and generous. Eleanor died in 1903, when Parker was nine.

Parker was raised on the Upper West Side and attended a Roman Catholic elementary school at the Convent of the Blessed Sacrament on West 79th Street; Parker joked that she was asked to leave following her characterization of the Immaculate Conception as "spontaneous combustion". She later attended Miss Dana's School, a finishing school in Morristown, New Jersey, graduating in 1911, at the age of 18, according to Arthur F. Kinney, although Rhonda Pettit and Marion Meade state she never graduated from high school. Following her father's death in 1913, she played piano at a dancing school to earn a living while she worked on her poetry. She sold her first poem to Vanity Fair magazine in 1914 and some months later was hired as an editorial assistant for Vogue. She moved to Vanity Fair as a staff writer after two years at Vogue.

In the winter of 1916, Parker and the writer Thorne Smith lived at the same New York boarding house. They were friends and reportedly had a sexual relationship. At the 1916 wedding of her friend Frances Heywood Billings, with whom she lived after her father's death, Parker met a Wall Street stockbroker, Edwin Pond Parker II (1893–1933); Parker recalled him as "beautiful" but "not very smart". They married on June 30th, 1917. The match was not approved and no family members attended the wedding. On July 30th, 1917, Edwin enlisted to serve in World War I with the Army Medical Corps. He returned in 1919 and the couple divorced in 1927, with Edwin marrying a woman nine years his senior immediately after the divorce.

== Algonquin Round Table years ==
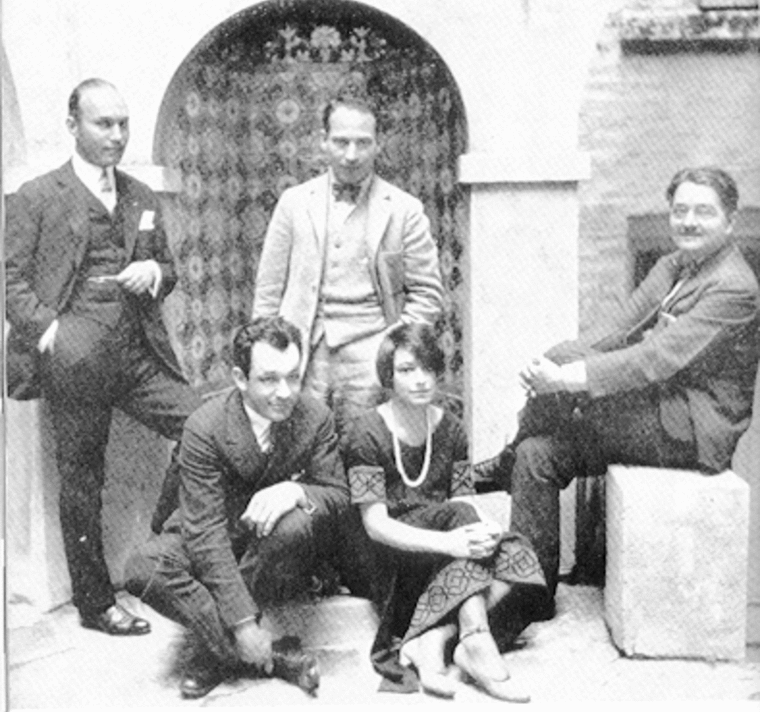
Parker, with Algonquin Round Table members and guests (l–r) Art Samuels (editor of Harper's and, briefly, The New Yorker), Charles MacArthur, Harpo Marx, and Alexander Woollcott

Parker's career took off in 1918 while she was writing theater criticism for Vanity Fair, filling in for the vacationing P. G. Wodehouse. At the magazine, she met Robert Benchley, who became a close friend, and Robert E. Sherwood. The trio lunched at the Algonquin Hotel almost daily. They were founding members of what became known as the Algonquin Round Table. Among its members were newspaper columnists Franklin P. Adams and Alexander Woollcott, as well as the editor Harold Ross, the novelist Edna Ferber, the reporter Heywood Broun, and the comedian Harpo Marx. Through their publication of her lunchtime remarks and short verses, particularly in Adams' column "The Conning Tower", Parker began developing a national reputation as a wit.

Even though many found Parker's caustic theater reviews very entertaining, she was dismissed by Vanity Fair on January 11, 1920, after her criticisms had too often offended the playwright–producer David Belasco, the actress Billie Burke, the impresario Florenz Ziegfeld, and others. Benchley, who was also a Vanity Fair columnist, resigned in protest. (Sherwood is sometimes reported to have done so too but conflicts between management and staff had been ongoing and he was fired in December 1919.) Parker soon started working for Ainslee's Magazine, which had a higher circulation. Her poems and short stories were published widely, "not only in upscale places like Vanity Fair (which was happier to publish her than employ her), The Smart Set, and The American Mercury, but also in the popular Ladies' Home Journal, Saturday Evening Post, and Life".

When Harold Ross founded The New Yorker in 1925, Parker and Benchley were part of a board of editors he established to allay the concerns of his investors. The magazine's first issue was published on February 21, 1925 and Parker wrote drama reviews for the first two issues. Her first poem in the New Yorker, "A Certain Lady", appeared in the February 28th issue. She became famous for her short, viciously humorous poems, many highlighting ludicrous aspects of her numerous and largely unsuccessful romantic affairs, and others wistfully considering the appeal of suicide.

The next 15 years were Parker's period of greatest productivity and success. In the 1920s alone she published some 300 poems and free verses in Vanity Fair, Vogue, "The Conning Tower" column, and The New Yorker as well as in Life, McCall's and The New Republic. Her poem "Song in a Minor Key" was included as part of a candid 1922 interview with N.E.A. writer Josephine Van de Grift.

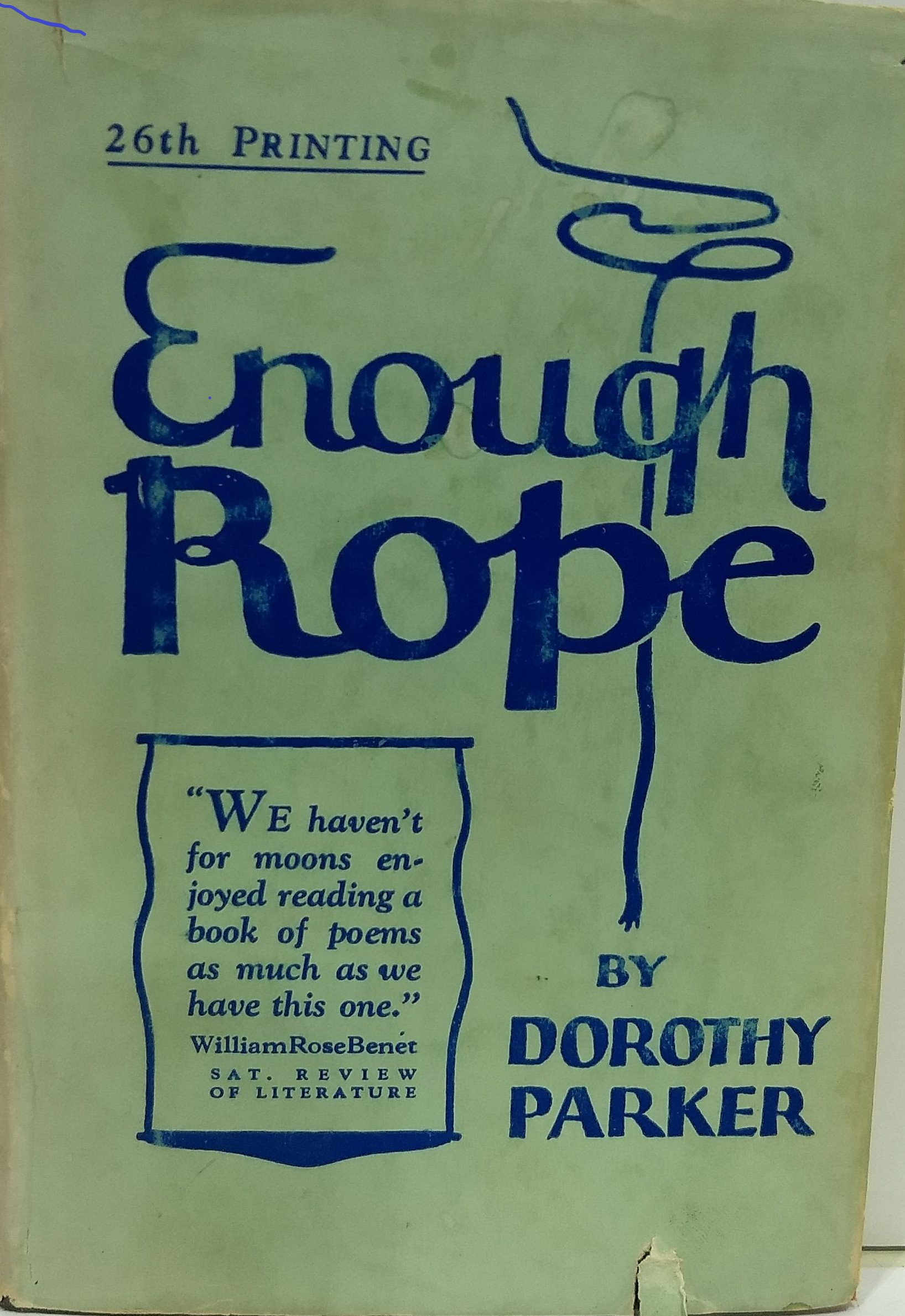
Cover of the first edition of Enough Rope (1926)

Parker published her first volume of poetry, Enough Rope, in 1926. It sold 47,000 copies and garnered impressive reviews. The Nation described her verse as "caked with a salty humor, rough with splinters of disillusion, and tarred with a bright black authenticity". Enough Rope included Parker's two-line poem "News Item" – "Men seldom make passes / At girls who wear glasses" – that would remain among her most remembered epigrams. She amused readers with poems that had a surprise or trick ending, akin to an O. Henry short story, such as:

By the time you swear you're his,
Shivering and sighing,
And he vows his passion is
Infinite, undying—
Lady, make a note of this:
One of you is lying.

— Unfortunate Coincidence

Razors pain you;
Rivers are damp;
Acids stain you;
And drugs cause cramp.
Guns aren't lawful;
Nooses give;
Gas smells awful;
You might as well live.

— Résumé

While some critics, notably The New York Times' reviewer, dismissed her work as "flapper verse", the book helped secure Parker's reputation for sparkling wit. She released two more volumes of verse, Sunset Gun (1928) and Death and Taxes (1931), along with the short story collections Laments for the Living (1930) and After Such Pleasures (1933). Not So Deep as a Well (1936) collected much of the material previously published in Rope, Gun, and Death; and she re-released her fiction with a few new pieces in 1939 as Here Lies.

In a 2000 essay, Literature Professor Wendy Martin said of Parker: "Although her sardonic poetry was extremely popular when it was published and remains readable today, her short stories are her greatest accomplishment." Parker's story "Big Blonde", published in The Bookman, won the O. Henry Award as the best short story of 1929. Several of her stories were written as soliloquies, where the narrator's voice evokes humor and pathos, such as the opening two paragraphs of "A Telephone Call":

Please, God, let him telephone me now. Dear God, let him call me now. I won't ask anything else of You, truly I won't. It isn't very much to ask. It would be so little to You, God, such a little, little thing. Only let him telephone now. Please, God. Please, please, please.

If I didn't think about it, maybe the telephone might ring. Sometimes it does that. If I could think of something else. If I could think of something else. Maybe if I counted five hundred by fives, it might ring by that time. I'll count slowly. I won't cheat. And if it rings when I get to three hundred, I won't stop; I won't answer it until I get to five hundred. Five, ten, fifteen, twenty, twenty-five, thirty, thirty-five, forty, forty-five, fifty…. Oh, please ring. Please.

Parker also tried her hand at writing for the stage. She collaborated with playwright Elmer Rice to create Close Harmony, which ran on Broadway in December 1924. The comedic play was well received in out-of-town previews and favorably reviewed in New York, but it closed after only 24 performances. As The Lady Next Door, it became a successful touring production.

Her other celebrated writing was published in The New Yorker in the form of acerbic book reviews under the byline "Constant Reader". Her response to the whimsy of A. A. Milne's The House at Pooh Corner was "Tonstant Weader fwowed up." Her reviews appeared semi-regularly from 1927 to 1933, and were deemed "immensely popular". They were posthumously published in 1970 in a collection titled Constant Reader, and then anthologized again in 2024.

Throughout much of the 1920s, she was separated from her husband Edwin Parker; they eventually divorced in 1928. She had a number of affairs, her lovers including reporter-turned-playwright Charles MacArthur and the publisher Seward Collins. Her relationship with MacArthur resulted in a pregnancy. Parker is alleged to have said, "how like me, to put all my eggs into one bastard". She had an abortion, and fell into a depression that culminated in her first attempt at suicide.

Toward the end of this period, Parker became more politically aware and active. What would turn into a lifelong commitment to activism began in 1927, when she grew concerned about the pending executions of Sacco and Vanzetti. Parker traveled to Boston to protest the proceedings. She and fellow Round Tabler Ruth Hale were arrested, and Parker eventually pleaded guilty to a charge of "loitering and sauntering", paying a $5 fine.

== Hollywood ==
In February 1932, after a breakup with boyfriend John McClain, Parker attempted suicide by swallowing barbiturates.

In 1932, she met Alan Campbell, an actor hoping to become a screenwriter. They married two years later in Raton, New Mexico. Campbell's mixed parentage was the reverse of Parker's: he had a German-Jewish mother and a Scottish father. She learned that he was bisexual and subsequently proclaimed in public that he was "queer as a billy goat". The pair moved to Hollywood and signed ten-week contracts with Paramount Pictures, with Campbell (also expected to act) earning $250 per week and Parker earning $1,000 per week. They would eventually earn $2,000 and sometimes more than $5,000 per week as freelancers for various studios. She and Campbell "[received] writing credit for over 15 films between 1934 and 1941".

In 1933, when informed that famously taciturn former president Calvin Coolidge had died, Parker remarked, "How could they tell?"

In 1935, Parker contributed lyrics for the song "I Wished on the Moon", with music by Ralph Rainger. The song was introduced in The Big Broadcast of 1936 by Bing Crosby.

With Campbell and Robert Carson, she wrote the script for the 1937 film A Star Is Born, for which they were nominated for an Academy Award for Best Writing—Screenplay. She wrote additional dialogue for The Little Foxes (1941), and did an uncredited "dialogue polish" of It's a Wonderful Life (1946). Together with Frank Cavett, she received a "Writing (Motion Picture Story)" Oscar nomination for Smash-Up, the Story of a Woman (1947), starring Susan Hayward.

After the U.S. entered the Second World War, Parker and Alexander Woollcott collaborated to produce an anthology of her work as part of a series published by Viking Press for servicemen overseas. With an introduction by W. Somerset Maugham, The Portable Dorothy Parker (1944) compiled over two dozen of her short stories, along with selected poems from Enough Rope, Sunset Gun, and Death and Taxes. In 1973, when a revised and enlarged edition of the book was released, the "Publishers' Note" stated that of the 75 volumes in the Viking Portable Library series, Dorothy Parker was one of three—along with Shakespeare and The World Bible—that "have remained continuously in print and selling steadily through time and change."

During the 1930s and 1940s, Parker became an increasingly vocal advocate of civil liberties and civil rights and a frequent critic of authority figures. During the Great Depression, she was among numerous American intellectuals and artists who became involved in related social movements. She reported in 1937 on the Loyalist cause in Spain for the Communist magazine New Masses. At the behest of Otto Katz, a covert Soviet Comintern agent and operative of German Communist Party agent Willi Münzenberg, Parker helped to found the Hollywood Anti-Nazi League in 1936, which the FBI suspected of being a Communist Party front. The League's membership eventually grew to around 4,000. According to David Caute, its often wealthy members were "able to contribute as much to [Communist] Party funds as the whole American working class", although they may not have been intending to support the Party cause.

Parker also chaired the Joint Anti-Fascist Refugee Committee's fundraising arm, "Spanish Refugee Appeal". She organized Project Rescue Ship to transport Loyalist veterans to Mexico, headed Spanish Children's Relief, and lent her name to many other left-wing causes and organizations. Her former Round Table friends saw less and less of her, and her relationship with Robert Benchley became particularly strained (although they would reconcile). Parker met S. J. Perelman at a party in 1932 and, despite a rocky start (Perelman called it "a scarifying ordeal"), they remained friends for the next 35 years. They became neighbors when the Perelmans helped Parker and Campbell buy a run-down farm in Bucks County, Pennsylvania, near New Hope, a popular summer destination among many writers and artists from New York.

After the attack on Pearl Harbor, Parker applied for a passport with plans to become a foreign correspondent, but her application was denied for political reasons. The FBI had compiled a 1,000-page dossier on her, detailing her involvement in leftist activities, which doomed her post-war screenwriting career. It was the time of the Second Red Scare when Senator Joseph McCarthy was raising alarms about communists in government and Hollywood. In 1950, she was identified as a Communist by the anti-Communist publication Red Channels. As a result, movie studio bosses placed her on the Hollywood blacklist. Her final screenplay was The Fan, a 1949 adaptation of Oscar Wilde's Lady Windermere's Fan, directed by Otto Preminger.

With only a small income from her book royalties, Parker and Campbell moved into an apartment "in an unfashionable West Hollywood neighborhood." She collected unemployment benefits while listing herself each week as available for work. Her persistent money troubles in Hollywood contributed to her harsh assessment of the place during a 1956 interview in New York:

Hollywood money isn't money. It's congealed snow, melts in your hand, and there you are. I can't talk about Hollywood. It was a horror to me when I was there and it's a horror to look back on. I can't imagine how I did it. When I got away from it I couldn't even refer to the place by name. 'Out there,' I called it.

Her marriage to Campbell was tempestuous, with tensions exacerbated by her increasing alcohol consumption and by his long-term affair with a married woman in Europe during World War II. Parker and Campbell divorced in 1947, remarried in 1950, and then separated again in 1952 when she moved back to New York. From 1957 to 1962, she wrote book reviews for Esquire. Her writing became increasingly erratic owing to her continued abuse of alcohol. She returned to Hollywood in 1961, reconciled once more with Campbell, and collaborated with him on a number of unproduced projects until Campbell died from a drug overdose in 1963.

== Later life and death ==
Following Campbell's death, Parker returned to New York City and the Volney apartments on East 74th Street. In her later years, she denigrated the Algonquin Round Table, although it had brought her such early notoriety:

These were no giants. Think who was writing in those days—Lardner, Fitzgerald, Faulkner and Hemingway. Those were the real giants. The Round Table was just a lot of people telling jokes and telling each other how good they were. Just a bunch of loudmouths showing off, saving their gags for days, waiting for a chance to spring them ... There was no truth in anything they said. It was the terrible day of the wisecrack, so there didn't have to be any truth ...

Parker occasionally participated in radio programs, including Information Please (as a guest) and Author, Author (as a regular panelist). She wrote for the Columbia Workshop, and both Ilka Chase and Tallulah Bankhead used her material for radio monologues.

Parker died on June 7, 1967, at age 73, of a heart attack. At the time of her death, she was still residing at the Volney building. In her will, she bequeathed her estate to Martin Luther King Jr., and upon King's death, to the NAACP.

=== Burial ===
Following her cremation, Parker's ashes were unclaimed for several years. Finally, in 1973, the crematorium sent them to her lawyer's office; by then he had retired, and the ashes remained in his colleague Paul O'Dwyer's filing cabinet for about 17 years. In 1988, O'Dwyer brought this to public attention, with the aid of celebrity columnist Liz Smith; after some discussion, the NAACP claimed Parker's remains and designed a memorial garden for them outside its Baltimore headquarters. The plaque read:

Here lie the ashes of Dorothy Parker (1893–1967) humorist, writer, critic. Defender of human and civil rights. For her epitaph she suggested, 'Excuse my dust'. This memorial garden is dedicated to her noble spirit which celebrated the oneness of humankind and to the bonds of everlasting friendship between Black and Jewish people. Dedicated by the National Association for the Advancement of Colored People. October 28, 1988.

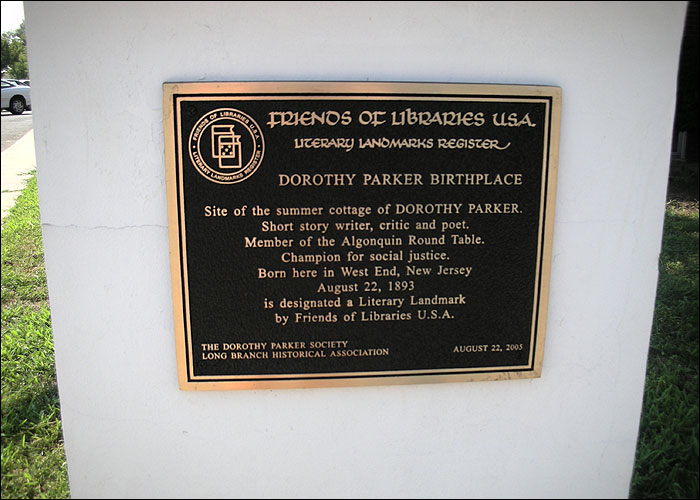
Plaque at Parker's birthplace

In early 2020, the NAACP moved its headquarters to downtown Baltimore and how this might affect Parker's ashes became the topic of much speculation, especially after the NAACP formally announced it would later move to Washington, D.C.

The NAACP restated that Parker's ashes would ultimately be where her family wished. "It’s important to us that we do this right," said the NAACP.

Relatives called for the ashes to be moved to the family's plot in Woodlawn Cemetery, in the Bronx, where a place had been reserved for Parker by her father. On August 18, 2020, Parker's urn was exhumed. "Two executives from the N.A.A.C.P. spoke, and a rabbi who had attended her initial burial said Kaddish." On August 22, 2020, Parker was re-buried privately in Woodlawn, with the possibility of a more public ceremony later. "Her legacy means a lot," added representatives from the NAACP.

== Honors ==
On August 22, 1992, the 99th anniversary of Parker's birth, the United States Postal Service issued a 29¢ U.S. commemorative postage stamp in the Literary Arts series. The Algonquin Round Table, as well as the number of other literary and theatrical greats who lodged at the hotel, contributed to the Algonquin Hotel's being designated in 1987 as a New York City Historic Landmark. In 1996, the hotel was designated as a National Literary Landmark by the Friends of Libraries USA, based on the contributions of Parker and other members of the Round Table. The organization's bronze plaque is attached to the front of the hotel. Parker's birthplace at the Jersey Shore was also designated a National Literary Landmark by Friends of Libraries USA in 2005 and a bronze plaque marks the former site of her family house.

In 2014, Parker was elected to the New Jersey Hall of Fame.

== In popular culture ==
Parker inspired a number of fictional characters in several plays of her day. These included "Lily Malone" in Philip Barry's Hotel Universe (1932), "Mary Hilliard" (played by Ruth Gordon) in George Oppenheimer's Here Today (1932), "Paula Wharton" in Gordon's 1944 play Over Twenty-one (directed by George S. Kaufman), and "Julia Glenn" in the Kaufman–Moss Hart collaboration Merrily We Roll Along (1934). Kaufman's representation of her in Merrily We Roll Along led Parker, once his Round Table compatriot, to despise him. She also was portrayed as "Daisy Lester" in Charles Brackett's 1934 novel Entirely Surrounded. She is mentioned in the original introductory lyrics in Cole Porter's song "Just One of Those Things" from the 1935 Broadway musical Jubilee, which have been retained in the standard interpretation of the song as part of the Great American Songbook. Additionally, she was mentioned in the title and lyrics of Prince's song "The Ballad of Dorothy Parker" on his 1987 album Sign o' The Times.

Parker is a character in the novel The Dorothy Parker Murder Case by George Baxt (1984), in a series of Algonquin Round Table Mysteries by J. J. Murphy (2011– ), and in Ellen Meister's novel Farewell, Dorothy Parker (2013). She is the main character in "Love for Miss Dottie", a short story by Larry N Mayer, which was selected by writer Mary Gaitskill for the collection Best New American Voices 2009 (Harcourt).

She has been portrayed on film and television by Dolores Sutton in F. Scott Fitzgerald in Hollywood (1976), Rosemary Murphy in Julia (1977), Bebe Neuwirth in Dash and Lilly (1999), and Jennifer Jason Leigh in Mrs. Parker and the Vicious Circle (1994). Neuwirth was nominated for an Emmy Award for her performance, and Leigh received a number of awards and nominations, including a Golden Globe nomination.

Television creator Amy Sherman-Palladino named her production company 'Dorothy Parker Drank Here Productions' in tribute to Parker.

Tucson actress Lesley Abrams wrote and performed the one-woman show Dorothy Parker's Last Call in 2009 in Tucson, Arizona, presented by the Winding Road Theater Ensemble. She reprised the role at the Live Theatre Workshop in Tucson in 2014. The play was selected to be part of the Capital Fringe Festival in DC in 2010.

In 2018, American drag queen Miz Cracker played Parker in the celebrity-impersonation game show episode of the Season 10 of Rupaul's Drag Race.

In the 2018 film Can You Ever Forgive Me? (based on the 2008 memoir of the same name), Melissa McCarthy plays Lee Israel, an author who for a time forged original letters in Dorothy Parker's name.

In 2025, in the television show “Only Murders In The Building,” a character played by Christoph Waltz claims that Dorothy Parker took his virginity.

In 2026, the one-actor play Vicious Circles & A Writer of Note: The Tempest of Dorothy Parker by Mike Broemmel premiered. The play stars Ellen Shamas-Brandt in the title role of Dorothy Parker.

== 2007 Dorothy Parker copyright trial ==
In Silverstein v. Penguin Putnam, Inc, the plaintiff claimed copyright in certain Parker poems that had been reproduced in Penguin's Dorothy Parker: Complete Poems after appearing in Not Much Fun, a volume edited by Stuart Y. Silverstein that had been the first collection to include these particular poems.

The Second Circuit reversed the district court’s initial award of summary judgment on the copyright claim insofar as it was based on Not Much Fun's arrangement of poems and the edits that Silverstein made and the titles he gave to some of the poems. The Second Circuit also vacated the judgment that Silverstein's selection of poems was protectible.... After a bench trial, the court held that the plaintiff’s selection of all of the poems lacked creativity and was therefore not copyrightable, ruling in favor of Penguin.

In a November 2007 decision, the court held that Silverstein had simply compiled all of the uncollected Parker poems he could find and that this selection process involved no creativity, so the collection was not entitled to copyright protection.

== Adaptations ==
In 1982, Anni-Frid Lyngstad recorded "Threnody", produced by Phil Collins and set to music by Per Gessle, for her third solo album Something's Going On, after she offered him a book of poems by Dorothy Parker.

In the 2010s some of her poems from the early 20th century have been set to music by the composer Marcus Paus as the operatic song cycle Hate Songs for Mezzo-Soprano and Orchestra (2014); Paus's Hate Songs was described by musicologist Ralph P. Locke as "one of the most engaging works" in recent years; "the cycle expresses Parker's favorite theme: how awful human beings are, especially the male of the species".

With the authorization of the NAACP, lyrics taken from her book of poetry Not So Deep as a Well were used in 2014 by Canadian singer Myriam Gendron to create a folk album of the same title. Also in 2014, Chicago jazz bassist/singer/composer Katie Ernst issued her album Little Words, consisting of her authorized settings of seven of Parker's poems.

In 2021 her book Men I'm Not Married To was adapted as an opera of the same name by composer Lisa DeSpain and librettist Rachel J. Peters. It premiered virtually as part of Operas in Place and Virtual Festival of New Operas commissioned by Baldwin Wallace Conservatory Voice Performance, Cleveland Opera Theater, and On Site Opera on February 18, 2021.

== Works ==
=== Short story collections ===
- 1930: Laments for the Living (thirteen short stories)
  - The Sexes
  - Mr. Durant
  - Just a Little One
  - New York to Detroit
  - The Wonderful Old Gentleman
  - The Mantle of Whistler
  - A Telephone Call
  - You Were Perfectly Fine
  - Little Curtis
  - The Last Tea
  - Big Blonde
  - Arrangement in Black and White
  - Dialogue at Three in the Morning
- 1933: After Such Pleasures (eleven short stories)
  - Horsie
  - Here We Are
  - Too Bad
  - From the Diary of a New York Lady
  - The Waltz
  - Dusk Before Fireworks
  - The Little Hours
  - Sentiment
  - A Young Woman in Green Lace
  - Lady With a Lamp
  - Glory in the Daytime
- 1939: Here Lies: The Collected Stories of Dorothy Parker
  Omits "The Mantle of Whistler" and "Dialogue at Three in the Morning" from Laments for the Living and "A Young Woman in Green Lace" from After Such Pleasures. Adds three previously uncollected stories:
  - Clothe the Naked
  - Soldiers of the Republic
  - The Custard Heart
- 1944: The Portable Dorothy Parker
  The original edition, arranged by Parker herself, includes all the stories from Here Lies plus five previously uncollected stories:
  - The Lovely Leave
  - The Standard of Living
  - Song of the Shirt, 1941
  - Mrs. Hofstadter on Josephine Street
  - Cousin Larry
- 1973: The Portable Dorothy Parker, revised and enlarged edition
  Includes all the stories from the 1944 edition plus three previously uncollected stories:
  - I Live on Your Visits
  - Lolita
  - Bolt Behind the Blue
- 1995: Complete Stories, edited by Colleen Breese (Penguin)
  Includes all the previously collected stories (restoring "The Mantle of Whistler", "Dialogue at Three in the Morning", and "A Young Woman in Green Lace"); nine "sketches"; and thirteen previously uncollected stories:
  - Such a Pretty Little Picture
  - A Certain Lady
  - Oh! He's Charming!
  - Travelogue
  - A Terrible Day Tomorrow
  - The Garter
  - The Cradle of Civilization
  - But the One on the Right
  - Advice to the Little Peyton Girl
  - Mrs. Carrington and Mrs. Crane
  - The Road Home
  - The Game
  - The Banquet of Crow

=== Poetry collections ===
- 1926: Enough Rope
- 1928: Sunset Gun
- 1931: Death and Taxes
- 1936: Not So Deep as a Well: Collected Poems by Dorothy Parker
- 1996: Not Much Fun: The Lost Poems of Dorothy Parker (UK title: The Uncollected Dorothy Parker)
  The second edition, published in 2009, includes additional poems.
- 1999: Complete Poems, edited by Colleen Breese (Penguin)
  First complete edition covering Parker's entire career and including her uncollected verse.

=== Journalism ===
==== Book reviews ====
Parker wrote forty-six book reviews and essays for The New Yorker between 1927 and 1933 under the pseudonym Constant Reader, with most appearing in 1927 and 1928. Some are included in the revised and enlarged edition of The Portable Dorothy Parker (1973). There are two other collections, both with limitations:

- Constant Reader (New York: Viking Press, 1970)
  Omits fifteen pieces and makes cuts to others.
- Constant Reader: The New Yorker Columns 1927–28 (New York: McNally Editions, 2024)
  Omits the eleven pieces that appeared from 1929 to 1933.

==== Theater reviews ====
- Complete Broadway, 1918–1923, edited by Kevin C. Fitzpatrick (Bloomington, IN: iUniverse, 2014)

=== Plays ===
- 1929: Close Harmony (with Elmer Rice)
- 1949: The Coast of Illyria (with Ross Evans), about the murder of Mary and Charles Lamb's mother by Mary
- 1953: Ladies of the Corridor (with Arnaud D'Usseau)

=== Screenplays ===
- 1936: Suzy (with Alan Campbell, Horace Jackson and Lenore J. Coffee; based on a novel by Herman Gorman)
- 1937: A Star is Born (with William A. Wellman, Robert Carson and Alan Campbell)
- 1938: Sweethearts (with Alan Campbell, Laura Perelman and S.J. Perelman)
- 1938: Trade Winds (with Alan Campbell and Frank R. Adams; story by Tay Garnett)
- 1941: Week-End for Three (with Alan Campbell; story by Budd Schulberg)
- 1942: Saboteur (with Peter Viertel and Joan Harrison)
- 1947: Smash-Up, the Story of a Woman (with Frank Cavett, John Howard Lawson and Lionel Wiggam)
- 1949: The Fan (with Walter Reisch and Ross Evans; based on Lady Windermere's Fan by Oscar Wilde)

== Sources ==
- Calhoun, Randall (1993). Dorothy Parker: A Bio-Bibliography. Westport, Connecticut: Greenwood Press. ISBN 0-313-26507-0.
- Crowther, Gail (2024). Dorothy Parker in Hollywood. New York: Gallery Books. ISBN 978-1-9821857-9-4.
- Fitzpatrick, Kevin C. (December 1, 2005). A Journey Into Dorothy Parker's New York. Berkeley, CA: Roaring Forties Press. ISBN 978-0-9777429-8-1.
- Keats, John (1970). You Might As Well Live: The Life and Times of Dorothy Parker. New York: Simon & Schuster.
- Lauterbach, Richard E. (1953). "The legend of Dorothy Parker". In Birmingham, Frederic A. (ed.). The girls from Esquire. London: Arthur Barker. pp. 192–202.
- Meade, Marion (1987). Dorothy Parker: What Fresh Hell Is This?. New York: Penguin Books. ISBN 0-14-011616-8.
- Perelman, S. J. (1981). "Dorothy Parker". The Last Laugh. New York: Simon & Schuster.
