= Maja S. K. Ratkje =

Norwegian vocalist and composer (born 1973)

Maja Ratkje
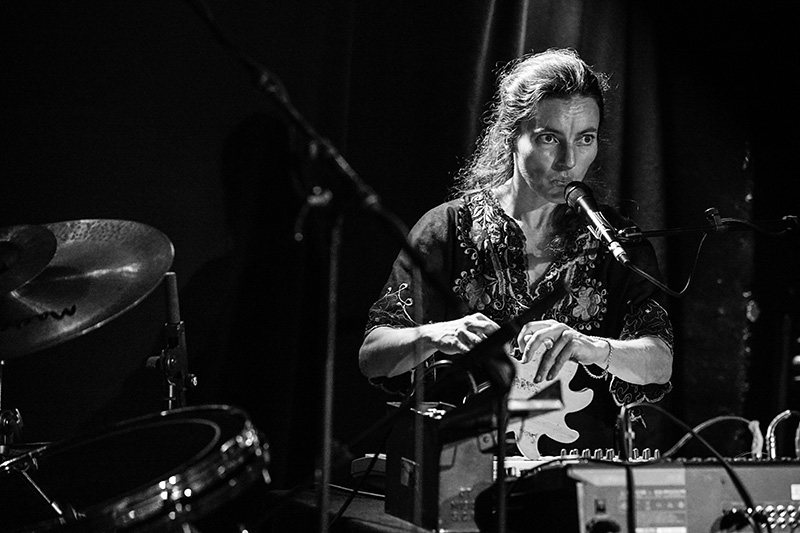
- In Aarhus, Denmark 2018

Background information
- Born: Maja Solveig Kjelstrup Ratkje; 29 December 1973 (age 52); Trondheim, Sør-Trøndelag
- Origin: Norway
- Genres: Jazz
- Occupations: Musician, composer
- Instruments: Vocals, electronics
- Website: ratkje.no

Maja Solveig Kjelstrup Ratkje (born 29 December 1973 in Trondheim, Norway) is a Norwegian vocalist and composer. She plays on vocals and electronics instruments.

== Career ==
Ratkje studied composition at the Norwegian Academy of Music in Oslo under the tutorship of Lasse Thoresen, Olav Anton Thommessen and Asbjørn Schaathun, and got her diploma in 2000. During the summer of 1999, Ratkje studied at IRCAM and she has also studied individually with composers such as Louis Andriessen, Sofia Gubaidulina, Ivar Frounberg, Klaus Huber, Joji Yuasa and Kaija Saariaho.

She performs and releases music for concerts, recordings, films, installations, theatre, dance and other performances. Maja is a member of SPUNK, a Norwegian improv group, and Agrare, a performance trio consisting of the noise duo Fe-mail and the Swedish dancer Lotta Melin. She has collaborated with, among others, Jaap Blonk, Lasse Marhaug, Joëlle Léandre, Per Inge Bjørlo, Stian Westerhus, Kathy Hinde, Odd Johan Fritzøe, POING, HC Gilje, Stephen O'Malley, Ikue Mori, and Zeena Parkins.

As a vocal soloist, Ratkje has performed with ensembles Engegårdkvartetten, Trondheim Symphony Orchestra, The Norwegian Radio Orchestra, BBC Scottish Symphony Orchestra, Ensemble InterContemporain and Klangforum Wien. In 2003 she also performed as a soloist at the Ultima Oslo Contemporary Music Festival premiere of her opera No Title Performance.

Ratkje's career as a composer spans from smaller chamber music works to opera, orchestral works, film-, dance and theatre music. Her works have seen performances by performers, ensembles and orchestras such as Ensemble Intercontemporain, BBC Scottish Symphony Orchestra, Klangforum Wien, Oslo Sinfonietta, Kringkastingsorkestret, Arve Tellefsen, Vertavokvartetten, Frode Haltli, Marianne Beate Kielland, Engegårdkvartetten and Cikada. Ratkje has twice been selected as the San Francisco-based Other Minds Festival's profile composer. Ratkje has also been composer in residence at festivals Trondheim Kammermusikkfestival, Nordland Musikkfestuke, Avanti! Summer Festival and at the Huddersfield Contemporary Music Festival. Key works includes Gagaku Variations (accordion, string quartet), Crepuscular Hour (3 choirs, 6 noise musicians, organ, electronics), Concerto for Voice and Orchestra, Essential Extensions, Korall Koral (baby opera) and Sinus Seduction (sax, tape).

In 2001 Ratkje was the first Norwegian composer to win the Arne Nordheim Composer's Prize. She is also a recipient of a number of domestic and international awards, including two Edvard Prizes and the UNESCO Rostrum Award as well as Award of Distinction with Jazkamer during the Prix Ars Electronica for her solo album Voice in 2003.

Ratkje has also served as a music critic for Norwegian weekly newspaper Morgenbladet and has published a book via publishing house Aschehoug: Stemmer.Eksperimentell Kvinneglam (ISBN 9788203356797). Ratkje is also an advocate for environmental issues, is a member of climate action group Stopp oljesponsing av norsk kulturliv (translation: End Oil-sponsorship of Norwegian Arts), and refrains from accepting offers for performances or commissions supported by the oil industry.

In 2020 her work Asylos was included on the album The Beauty That Still Remains by the Norwegian Girls' Choir alongside the eponymous work by Marcus Paus.

In 2021, Ratkje was awarded the Lindeman Prize, one of Norway’s most prestigious music honors, in recognition of her outstanding work as a composer. That same year, she received an Honorary Mention at ZKM’s Giga-Hertz Awards for her digital work "Corona lockdown concert for TUSK Festival 2020." Her composition "Considering Icarus," premiered by Stephen Menotti and the SWR Symphonieorchester at Donaueschinger Musiktage, was nominated for the Music Composition Prize of the Prince Pierre of Monaco Foundation in 2024.

== Honors ==
- 1999: Edvardprisen in the category for contemporary music – smaller works for Waves II b
- 2001: Arne Nordheims Composer Prize
- 2001: second place in the International Competition of Electroacoustic Music Russolo in Paris for composers below 30 years of age
- 2003: Recipient of an Award of Distinction in the digital musics category at this year's Prix Ars Electronica
- 2004: Edvardprisen in the open category for No Title Performance and Sparkling Water

== Production ==
=== Selected works ===
==== Orchestral works ====
- Waves I (1997)
- No Title Performance and Sparkling Water, opera, premiered at the Ultima Oslo Contemporary Music Festival (2003)
- Concerto for Voice (moods III) (2004)
- Engebøfjellet; Where were you when they cut me down from the gallows? «Deep brass orchestra and electric guitar», with Stephen O'Malley (2011)
- Crepuscular Hour (2012)
- ASYLOS (2013)
- Tale of Lead and Frozen Light (2014)
- Concerto for Voice (moods IIIc) (2015)

==== Chamber works ====
- Sinus Seduction (moods two) (1997)
- River Mouth Echoes (2001)
- Gagaku Variations (2001)
- Du som fremmed (2001)
- Rondo – Bastard – Overture – Explosion (2004)
- ØX (2005)
- Ro-Uro (2007)
- Breaking the News (2010)
- Tale of Lead and Light (2011)
- Ein Häppchen noch (2011)
- Softly as I leave you (2012)
- "And sing while thou on pressed flowers dost sleep" (2012)
- Putin's Case (2012)
- In Dialogue with Rudnik (2014)
- Doppelgänger (2015)
- Ekkokammer 2.0 (2014–15)

==== Works for stage productions ====
- De Tenen van God (2004)
- Adventura Anatomica (2005)
- Carrying Our Ears and Eyes in Small Bags (2006)
- Høyt oppe i fjellet (2011)
- Larache (2011)
- Adventura Botanica (2013)
- Ekkokammer 2.0 (2014–15)
- Revelations (This Early Song) (2017)

==== Multimedia works, film music ====
- Das Wohltemperierte SPUNK (2001–12)
- Wintergarden (2005)
- Jazzgym (2008)
- Breathe (2008)
- Desibel (2009)
- Dancing Cranes (2010)

=== Solo ===
- 2002: Voice (Ratkje)|Voice (Rune Grammofon)
- 2006: Stalker (Maja Ratkje album)|Stalker (Important Records)
- 2006: Adventura Anatomica (Semishigure)
- 2007: Teip (Ambolthue)
- 2008: River Mouth Echoes (Tzadik)
- 2009: Cyborgic (The Last Record Company)
- 2010: Danse Macabre (Kassettkultur)
- 2013: Janus (Erratum), with Joachim Montessuis
- 2014: In Dialogue With Eugeniusz Rudnik (Bôłt)
- 2015: Celadon (Important Records), with Jon Wesseltoft, Camille Norment, Per Gisle Galåen
- 2016: Crepuscular Hour (Rune Grammofon)
- 2019: Sult (Rune Grammofon)

=== Collaborations ===
With SPUNK

- 1999: Det Eneste Jeg Vet Er At Det Ikke Er En Støvsuger (Rune Grammofon)
- 2001: Filtered By Friends (Remix album) (Rune Grammofon)
- 2002: Den Øverste Toppen På En Blåmalt Flaggstang (Rune Grammofon)
- 2005: En Aldeles Forferdelig Sykdom (Rune Grammofon)
- 2009: Kantarell (Rune Grammofon)

With Fe-mail

- 2003: Syklubb fra Hælvete, vinyl (TV5)
- 2004: Syklubb fra Hælvete, CD (Important Records)
- 2004: All Men Are Pigs (Fe-mail and Lasse Marhaug) (Gameboy Records)
- 2005: Voluptuous Vultures, vinyl (PsychForm Records)
- 2006: Northern Stains (Fe-mail & Carlos Giffoni) (Important Records)
- 2006: Voluptuous Vultures, CD (PsychForm Records)
- 2006: Blixter Toad (Asphodel)

Other collaborations

- 2006: Banquet For King Ludwig II Of Bavaria! (from the album The Rose Has Teeth In The Mouth Of A Beast), with Matmos
- 2011: Wach Auf! (Øra Fonogram), with Poing
- 2012: Treasure Hunt (TiConZero), with Ikue Mori, Simon Balestrazzi, Sylvie Courvoisier, Alessandro Olla
- 2013: Scrumptious Sabotage (Bocian Records), with Ikue Mori
- 2016: Drono - "Lakes" (LINE Imprint), with Derek Piotr

Compilations

- 2009: Solveigs Lied (TIBProd), Maskinanlegg vs. Solveig Kjelstrup
