= No Search, No Rescue =

English-language poem Palestinian poet Jehan Bseiso

- by Jehan Bseiso
- Written: 2015
- Language: English
- Publisher: Electronic Intifada
- Publication date: 2015

No Search, No Rescue is an English-language poem by the Palestinian poet Jehan Bseiso (born 1983) on the refugee crisis. The first stanza reads: "How do we overcome war and poverty only to drown in your sea?" The poem has also been referred to as a film poem. It was first published by Electronic Intifada in 2015. It has been set to music twice, by the Norwegian composer Marcus Paus and the Italian composer Silvia Borzelli.

Augusta, Italy
Where is the interpreter?
This is my family.
Baba, mama, baby all washed up on the shore. This is 28 shoeless survivors and thousands of bodies.
Bodies Syrian, Bodies Somali, Bodies Afghan, Bodies Ethiopian, Bodies Eritrean.
Bodies Palestinian.
Your Sea, Mare, Bahr. Our war, our Harb.

— Jehan Bseiso, No Search, No Rescue (third stanza)

== Musical adaptations ==
=== Paus ===
The poem was set to music as a choral work by the Norwegian composer Marcus Paus in 2017. The choral work was commissioned by the Norwegian Youth Choir under the direction of the Israeli conductor Yuval Weinberg for the joint anniversary concert of the Norwegian Youth Choir, the Norwegian Composers' Association and Arena: Klassisk. The choral work has also been performed in many church concerts in the Church of Norway.

=== Borzelli ===
The poem was also set to music by the Italian composer Silvia Borzelli, commissioned by Radio France.
