= Joachim Kwetzinsky =

Norwegian pianist (born 1978)

Joachim Victor Birkeland Kjelsaas von Kwetzinsky-Stetzenkow (born 8 April 1978), known as Joachim Kwetzinsky, is a Norwegian pianist.

== Background ==
He is a son of the author Oddbjørn Birkeland and the pianist Berit Kjelsaas Kwetzinsky, and a stepson of the scenographer Truls Kwetzinsky (born Wassily Michail Fjodor Grossow von Palm von Kwetzinsky-Stetzenkow), who is himself a son of the Russian-born music critic Wassily von Kwetzinsky and a grandson of the Russian general Mikhail Kvetsinsky, who both came to Norway in 1920 as refugees from the Russian Revolution.

== Education and work ==
Joachim Kwetzinsky studied at the Norwegian Academy of Music, and has been a student of Einar Steen-Nøkleberg, Liv Glaser and Jiri Hlinka. He has given concerts in over 20 countries and has published several albums. He is known for his collaboration with David Arthur Skinner, Johannes Martens and Marcus Paus, and published the album Marcus Paus i 2013.

== Prizes ==
He won the Concours Grieg Prize in 2002 and the Robert Levin Prize in 2009.

== Albums ==
- Polyphonic Dialogues, 2L
- Figments and Fragments, 2L
- Marcus Paus, Aurora, 2013
