= Tirill Mohn =

Norwegian composer, singer and violinist

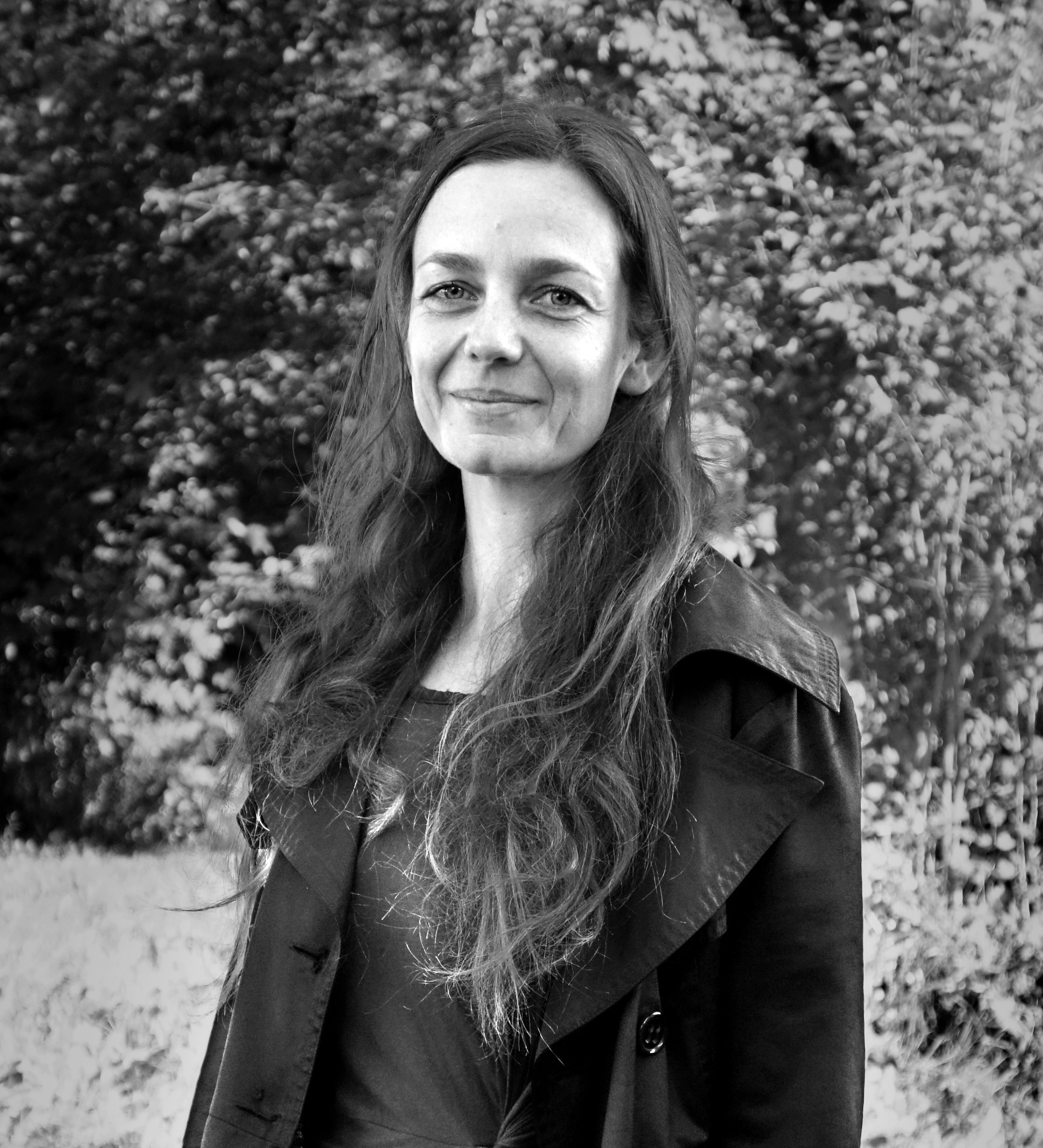
- Pronunciation: [ˈtɪrɪl ˈmuːn]
- Born: 22 February 1975 (age 50); Oslo, Norway
- Occupation(s): Composer, singer, violinist
- Spouse: Marcus Paus

Tirill Mohn (pronounced [ˈtɪrɪl ˈmuːn]; born 22 February 1975), also known mononymously as Tirill, is a Norwegian composer, singer and violinist. She was a member of the art rock band White Willow, and has released several solo albums.

Mohn is a descendant of the artists Christian Krohg and Oda Krohg. In 2019 she married the composer Marcus Paus; she and her husband are distantly related as both are descendants of Norway's first attorney-general Bredo Henrik von Munthe af Morgenstierne Sr.

== Discography ==
Solo albums

- A Dance with the Shadows (2003)
- Tales from Tranquil August Gardens (2011)
- Nine and Fifty Swans (2011)
- Um Himinjǫður (2013)
- Said the Sun to the Moon (2019)
- Three Love Songs And A Swan Song (2022)
