= Children of Ginko =

Opera by Marcus Paus

- Opera by Marcus Paus
- Native title: Frøbarna
- Librettist: Oda Fiskum
- Language: Norwegian / English
- Premiere: 2020; Shanghai

Children of Ginko (Norwegian: Frøbarna) is a children's opera by Marcus Paus, set to a Norwegian-language libretto by Oda Fiskum. It was written in 2017/2018 and premiered in Shanghai in 2020 as part of the Ibsen International project, supported by the Norwegian Ministry of Foreign Affairs. The opera is inspired by the Svalbard Global Seed Vault project, and is part of the government-supported art project "The Seed" that aims to raise awareness about ecological issues.

The opera is set in a near future, when "The Big Sleep" has caused the world to freeze into an ice desert. Hidden in a sanctuary, two sisters, "seed children", set out to wake the planet. The opera aims to promote ecological conscience and "reveal the power of nature and celebrate children’s courage in growing up."
