= Concerto for Timpani and Orchestra (Paus) =

Composition by Marcus Paus

Concerto for Timpani and Orchestra is a timpani concerto by Marcus Paus, written for the 250th anniversary of Bergen Philharmonic Orchestra. It was first performed by Bergen Philharmonic Orchestra conducted by Andrew Litton on 19 February 2015 with Håkon Kartveit (principal timpanist of Bergen Philharmonic) as Soloist. The premiere was broadcast by NRK.

The concerto was extensively debated in the music journal Ballade in 2015 after it was attacked by atonal modernist composer Olav Anton Thommessen for not being atonal or modernist. The concerto was defended by the composer Ragnar Søderlind, who considered the concerto a good starting point for the debate about 21st century (classical) music, and argued that the atonal modernist movement has become "smug and controlling."
