= Wassily von Kwetzinsky =

Wassily von Kwetzinsky-Stetzenkow (born 26 August or 7 September 1898 in Nikolsk-Ussuriysky in Russia, died 17 November 1970 in Oslo, Norway) (Russian: Василий Михайлович Квецинский; Vasily Mikhailovich Kvetsinsky) was a Russian-born Norwegian music critic and writer. He came to Norway in 1920 as a refugee from the Russian Revolution together with his father, General Mikhail Kvetsinsky.

He served in the Russian Army, where he became a captain in the Leib Guard Chasseur Regiment on 25 September 1917. In July 1919 he joined the White Army at Arkhangelsk during the North Russia Intervention, where he served with his father, who was chief of staff to Governor-General Yevgeny Miller. In December 1919 he evacuated to Finland, and in the following year he came to Norway. His father died as a cab driver and brewery labourer at Lillehammer in Norway in 1923.

Wassily von Kwetzinsky wrote a series of articles on the Russian Revolution in Norwegian newspapers in 1920 and 1921. He was a teacher of music theory at the Oslo Conservatory of Music from 1929 to 1948, and became known as a music critic and cultural figure. He was also active as a composer, translator from Russian and author of crime fiction set in Russia.

He became a Norwegian citizen under the legal name Wassily von Kwetzinsky-Stetzenkow, and was usually known as Wassily von Kwetzinsky, often in an abbreviated form, e.g. W. v. Kwetzinsky. He was the grandfather of the pianist Joachim Kwetzinsky.
