= Mikhail Kvetsinsky =

Russian general (1866–1923)

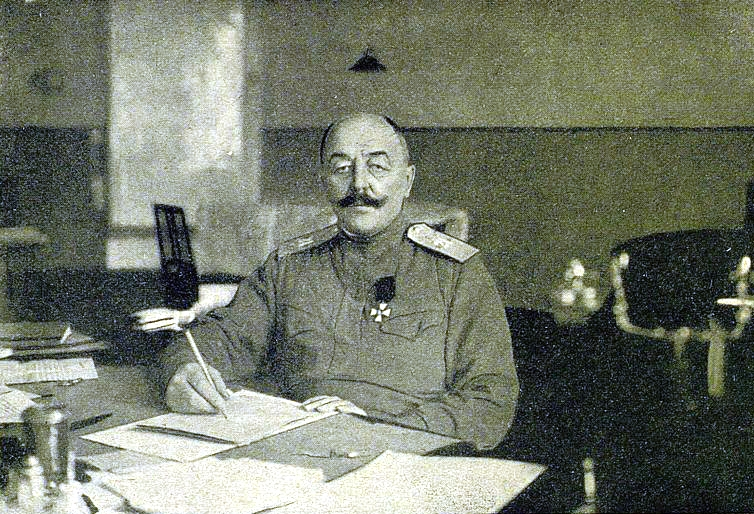
- Kvetskinsky before 1917
- Native name: Михаил Квецинский
- Born: January 3, 1866; Moscow Governorate, Russian Empire
- Died: March 31, 1923 (aged 57) Lillehammer, Norway
- Buried: Lillehammer, Norway
- Allegiance: Russia (Russia) White Movement
- Branch: Imperial Russian Army
- Service years: 1891–1920
- Rank: Lieutenant-General (1915)
- Commands: Mukden garrison (chief); 1st East-Siberian Rifle Regiment; 21st Infantry Division; 3rd Army; Kiev Military District
- Conflicts: Russo-Japanese War; World War I Russian Civil War
- Awards: Order of Saint George, 4th Class (1915)
- Children: 2

Mikhail Fyodorovich Kvetsinsky (Russian: Михаил Фёдорович Квецинский; January 3, 1866 – March 31, 1923), also known as Michael (von) Kwetzinsky, was a Russian officer and a military administrator. He held notable command posts in the Russian Far East, during the Russo-Japanese War, during the First World War and during the Russian Civil War, when he was one of the leaders of the White Army of the North during the North Russia Intervention. Kvetsinsky became a Major-General in 1910 and a Lieutenant-General in 1915.

He fled to Norway together with his superior Yevgeny Miller in 1920 and lived as a cab driver and labourer at a brewery at Lillehammer until his death three years later. His son Wassily von Kwetzinsky became a music critic and cultural figure in Norway. The Norwegian pianist Joachim Kwetzinsky is a stepson of his grandson.

== Background ==
He was born in Moscow Governorate to a Russian Orthodox military family and was the son of Fyodor Kvetsinsky, a captain in the Russian Army.

== Military career ==
He obtained his education at the third Alexandrov's Institute, graduating in 1885 as an infantry officer and soon enrolling into the Nikolayev Academy of General Staff which he finished in 1891.

At first he was commissioned into the 8th Artillery Brigade.

=== Staff adjutant ===
Since February 9, 1892, he was a senior staff adjutant of the 17th Infantry Division (ID) and since October 12 the same year he was the assistant to the senior staff adjutant of the Warsaw Military District. On February 1, 1893 he was appointed as the senior staff adjutant of the 3rd Guard ID.

=== Staff officer ===
From December 6, 1893 until February 25, 1902 he was assigned as a staff officer to the headquarters of the 1st East-Siberian Rifle Brigade. From July 15 to September 8, 1900, he was the Chief of Staff of the South-Manchuria military unit. Since February 25, 1901 - duty staff officer of the Kwantung armed forces field headquarters.

=== Commanding officer ===
Since June 2, 1901 - acting military commissioner at the Mukden court, February 27 of next year in the Mukden government. From February 23, 1904 he was the chief of Mukden garrison and participated in the Russo-Japanese War. From March 9, 1904 he was assigned to the namestnik court of the Russian Far East and since September 6, 1905 he was chief of staff of the Russian Far East armed forces. From December 27, 1906 he was the commander of the 1st East-Siberian Rifle Regiment.

=== World War I ===
On July 6, 1910 he was appointed the chief of staff at the 3rd Caucasus Army Corps with which he entered World War I as part of the 3rd Army of the South-Western front. For his achievements in battles near the town of Kodenitsy in September 1914 he was awarded the Order of Saint George of IV grade (order of April 15, 1915). Since January 8, 1915 he was the commander of the 21st ID. On February 8, 1915 he was transferred as the chief of staff to the 2nd Army of general V. V. Smirnov. From September 21, 1915 chief of staff of the Western front armies, the closest assistant to general Alexei Evert where he actively participated in the planning for the military front operations. On April 3, 1917 he was appointed as the commander of the 3rd Army which was at the left wing of the Western front covering the Polotsk direction. He attempted to resolve the revolutionary situation in his units and even achieved from the Army Committee deportation to the rear of the most revolutionary adjusted saboteurs. At the start of the June Advance the army consisted of the 5th, 15th, 20th, and 35th Army Corps, but it did not participated in the advance.

=== Struggle against the Bolshevik agitators ===
After the July activities partook serious preventive actions to cease the revolutionary agitation in the army including after artillery fire the decommissioning of the 693rd Infantry Slutsk Regiment (174th ID, 20th Army Corps) which refused to surrender the Bolshevik agents. From October 20, 1917, he became the commander of the Kiev Military District and unsuccessfully tried to extinguish the Kiev Bolshevik Uprising. He showed himself as a non-initiative leader and virtually surrendered his officers to the Bolsheviks.

=== White Army of the North ===
When General Miller was appointed the head of the anti-Bolshevik government of the Northern Oblast (1918–20) in January 1919, Kvetsinsky was made the chief of staff of his Northern Army. Later Kvetsinsky was requested to resign, yet remained the chief of staff until the evacuation of the White Russian forces in February 1920.

== Life in exile ==
He emigrated to Tromsø, Norway along with the rest of the Miller's government officials on ice-breaker Kuzma Minin. During the withdrawal from Arkhangelsk a sea battle took place between two ice-breakers which is the only battle in the history involving ice-breakers. For a short while the Russian immigrants were interned in the Norwegian military camp Værnesmoen. Upon release Kvetsinsky worked as a bootman, but later moved to Lillehammer, Norway. There he found job at the local brewery while also driving a taxicab. His son Wassily von Kwetzinsky who was a captain in the Russian Army enrolled into the Norwegian Institute of Technology in Trondheim, and later become a noted music critic. After a couple of years, Kvetsinsky became sick and was put into a local Red Cross hospital where he died after several months on March 31, 1923. He was buried at the city's cemetery in Lillehammer.
