= August Schieldrop =

Norwegian tubist (born 1999)

- Born: 1999 (age 26–27); Oslo, Norway
- Occupation: Tubist

August Schieldrop (born 1999) is a Norwegian classical tubist who performs as a soloist with the Oslo Philharmonic and the Norwegian Radio Orchestra. He has received several of Norway's main music prizes.

== Career ==
Schieldrop was born in Oslo. He attended Oslo Waldorf School where he played tuba at the school's orchestra, and is educated at the Norwegian Academy of Music. He has received several of Norway's main music prizes. He won the music prize Fjord Cadenza in 2016. He received the prize "Musician of the Year" from the Norwegian Music Competition for Youth in 2020. In 2021 he won the Music Prize of Equinor. He has performed as a soloist with the Oslo Philharmonic, the Norwegian Radio Orchestra and the Bergen International Festival. The tuba concerto Tuba Mirum by Marcus Paus was originally written for Schieldrop, and performed by Schieldrop and the Oslo Philharmonic and broadcast by NRK.
