= Tuba Mirum (Paus) =

Concerto for tuba and orchestra by Marcus Paus

Tuba Mirum is a concerto for tuba and orchestra by the Norwegian composer Marcus Paus. The work was commissioned by the Oslo Philharmonic and written specifically for the tubist August Schieldrop. It was first performed in 2021 by Schieldrop and the Oslo Philharmonic under their chief conductor Klaus Mäkelä, and the premiere was also broadcast by the Norwegian national broadcaster, NRK. The work has a duration of 20 minutes. The work is described by the Norwegian national encyclopedia Store norske leksikon as one of Paus' major works. The work was positively received by Norwegian classical music critics, and NRK's music critic Stein Eide described the work as a key new tuba concerto.

Paus said that "all instruments have their pioneers for the development of the instrument, and Schieldrop is one of those musicians who at an early age has begun to feel that the available repertoire has become too narrow. The title refers both to the instrument as a far-reaching miracle in the hands of a virtuoso soloist, but also to sequences from the Catholic death mass "Dies Irae", from which it borrows the title and musical iconography."
