= The War Cross (Paus) =

Composition by Marcus Paus

The War Cross (Norwegian: Krigskorset) is a full-length musical work in thirty movements composed by Marcus Paus on commission from the Norwegian Armed Forces. The work was premiered and released as an album by the Norwegian Army Music Corps in 2023. The Norwegian Armed Forces commissioned Paus to compose a work that would be "identity-building and unifying" by depicting "the emotions behind the many stories of the War Cross, honoring those who have received the recognition, and perhaps inspire others to effort for Norway."

The work is composed with a view to be performed both in its entirety and in individual parts for various occasions. It is the most comprehensive commission the Norwegian Armed Forces has ever given for the creation of new music for military use since the modern Army was founded in 1628.
