= The Ash-Lad – Pål's Story =

Opera by Marcus Paus and Ole Paus

- Opera by Marcus Paus
- Native title: Askeladden – Påls versjon
- Librettist: Ole Paus
- Language: Norwegian
- Premiere: 2011; Norwegian National Opera and Ballet

The Ash-Lad – Pål's Story (Norwegian: Askeladden – Påls versjon) (Askeladden – Påls versjon) is a children's opera composed by Marcus Paus to a Norwegian-language libretto by Ole Paus. It was commissioned by the Norwegian National Opera and Ballet and premiered in 2011. Consisting of three scenes with a duration of about 80 minutes, it is based on the Norwegian fairy tales about Askeladden (The Ash-Lad) and tells the story from the perspective of the perennial loser and underdog, the Ash-Lad's brother Pål.
