= Missa Concertante =

Mass

Missa Concertante is a mass composed by Marcus Paus in 2008. It was first performed by Oslo Chamber Choir, principal cathedral organist Kåre Nordstoga, saxophonist Rolf Erik Nystrøm, percussionist Katrine Nyheim and Oslo String Quartet at Oslo International Church Music Festival in 2008. Based on the traditional Catholic mass, it also features concerto elements. The work has been lauded by music critics.
