= The Beauty That Still Remains =

Choral composition by Marcus Paus

- by Marcus Paus
- Genre: choral composition
- Text: Anne Frank
- Language: English/Norwegian
- Composed: 2015

The Beauty That Still Remains is a full-length choral work by Norwegian composer Marcus Paus, that is based on The Diary of a Young Girl by Anne Frank, and has received critical acclaim. It was commissioned by the Government of Norway for the official Norwegian 70th anniversary of the end of the Second World War in 2015, and written for the Norwegian Girls' Choir, historically the girl's choir of the Norwegian Broadcasting Corporation; it premiered in 2015 in the Atrium of the University of Oslo (where the Nobel Peace Prize was formerly awarded), and the premiere was opened by Minister of Defence Ine Marie Eriksen Søreide. It was released on the 2020 studio album The Beauty That Still Remains by the Norwegian Girls' Choir alongside Maja Ratkje's avant-garde choral work Asylos.

== Content and reception ==
The libretto is written by Paus based on Anne Frank's diary and includes edited parts of it. It includes eleven movements: "Prologue: Dearest Kitty," "The World Transformed I", "Cadenza I," "Empty Days," "Cadenza II," "Prescription for Gunfire Jitters," "A Portrait of Anne," "Intimations of Love," "Cadenza III," "The World Transformed II" and "Epilogue: The Beauty That Still Remains."

The work "takes its title from one of the most famous, defiant, and affecting quotes from The Diary of Anne Frank":

At such moments I don't think about all the misery, but about the beauty that still remains. This is where Mother and I differ greatly. Her advice in the face of melancholy is: "Think about all the suffering in the world and be thankful you're not part of it." My advice is: "Go outside, to the country, enjoy the sun and all nature has to offer. Go outside and try to recapture the happiness within yourself; think of all the beauty in yourself and in everything around you and be happy.

— Anne Frank, "The Diary of a Young Girl"

Guy Rickards noted in Gramophone:

The sentiment of that quote, its focus on the positive in a time of dire peril, is the pillar around which Marcus Paus' extraordinarily beautiful cantata is constructed, encapsulated in the last of its eleven movements, "Epilogue," setting those very words in an outpouring of melody that is captivating and heartbreaking in equal measure (...) Something of the power of Paus’ conception derives from the primary use of a girls’ chorus as the main musical channel, many of the singers—in any performance—therefore of an age with Anne Frank when she wrote those words, and was then betrayed and transported to the death camps. That would count for little were the quality of Paus’ musical invention not as high as it is, however. It is given an added dimension by the role of the accordion accompaniment (...) although there are points where it is debatable who is accompanying whom. There is a real sense of fusion, counterpoint and cross-fertilisation between the musical strands here, such that while I referred above to The Beauty That Still Remains being a ‘cantata’, I could with equal justification term it a concerto for accordion with choral accompaniment. The music works equally well in both elements and even more so in synthesis. The Finnish composer Mikko Heiniö has achieved a similar intensity of blend in some of his piano concertos (albeit not quite as uniformly successfully as Paus here) and the ultimate progenitor of this type of work is the incomparable Wirklicher Wald of Arne Nordheim. This is quite the finest work by Marcus Paus that I have heard.

== Album ==
In 2020 the studio album The Beauty That Still Remains by the Norwegian Girls' Choir was released by 2L; it includes Paus' eponymous work as well as Maja Ratkje's avant-garde choral work Asylos. Music critic Ola Nordal described the work as "a masterpiece." Dominy Clements noted that the album is "filled with intriguing juxtapositions, with children’s songs and games rubbing shoulders with Gregorian chant, spoken word and beautiful singing and all kinds of theatrical scenes being created and as quickly dissolved into jaw-dropping moments of unexpected stylistic and musical counterpoint."
