= Marcus Paus =

Norwegian composer (born 1979)

- Born: Marcus Nicolay Paus; 14 October 1979 (age 46); Oslo, Norway
- Occupation: Composer
- Notable work: The War Cross • Children of Ginko • Slava Ukraini! (song)
- Spouse: Tirill Mohn
- Parents: Ole Paus (father); Anne-Karine Strøm (mother)

Marcus Nicolay Paus (Norwegian pronunciation: [ˈmɑɾ.kʉs ˈpæʉs]; born 14 October 1979) is a Norwegian composer and one of the most performed contemporary Scandinavian composers. As a classical contemporary composer he is noted as a representative of a reorientation toward tradition, tonality and melody, and his works have been lauded by critics in Norway and abroad. His work includes chamber music, choral works, solo works, concerts, orchestral works, operas, symphonies and church music, as well as works for theatre, film and television. Paus is regarded as "one of the most celebrated classical composers of Norway" and "the leading Norwegian composer of his generation."

Paus has said he considers himself to be a "musical dramatist" or storyteller. Although often tonal and melodically driven, Paus's music employs a wide range of both traditional and modernist techniques, and several of Paus's works have been influenced by folk music and non-Western classical music. Paus has referred to himself as a "melodist," "anarcho-traditionalist" or a humanist composer, and is known for advocating musical pluralism. He has "garnered a reputation as a prolific, versatile, and highly communicative contemporary composer" whose "works revolve around a strong appreciation for the functional use of traditional harmonies and form, combined with his uniquely idiosyncratic contemporary expressive language." He has also been described as a lyrical modernist or a postmodern composer. In 2022 Paus was commissioned by the Norwegian Armed Forces to write a major "identity-building and unifying" work for the armed forces.

Marcus Paus has set to music poets and writers such as Dorothy Parker, W. B. Yeats, Oscar Wilde, Siegfried Sassoon, Richard Wilbur, William Shakespeare, Christina Rossetti, Emily Dickinson and Anne Frank, and Norwegians André Bjerke, Jens Bjørneboe, Arne Garborg, Knut Hamsun, Johan Falkberget, Harald Sverdrup and Ole Paus. His church music works include O Magnum Mysterium and Requiem. He is one of the few Norwegian contemporary opera composers and has written several operas for children in cooperation with Ole Paus. He co-hosts the podcast series Paus og Castle blir kloke på musikklivet (Paus and Castle Figure Out Music Life) with punk and rap musician Kim Morten Mohn.

== Background ==
Coat of arms of the Paus family

A member of the Paus family, Marcus Paus was born in Oslo and is a son of one of Norway's best known singer-songwriters Ole Paus and the former pop star Anne-Karine Strøm. He grew up in Oslo's Røa borough. His grandfather, General Ole (Otto Cicin von) Paus, was head of the army group in the military intelligence service of the exile Norwegian High Command in London during the Second World War, one of the founders of the Norwegian Intelligence Service and later the highest-ranking Norwegian in NATO's Command Structure in the 1970s; he was born and raised in Vienna to the Norwegian Consul-General Thorleif (von) Paus and a Viennese mother, Gabriele (Ella) Stein, whose family had converted from Judaism to Catholicism. Ella's father, the Viennese lawyer August Stein (1852–1890), left the Jewish Community of Vienna in 1877, had his children baptized as Catholics in 1885 and converted to Catholicism himself the following year. The family name was officially spelled "von Paus" (or sometimes "de Paus") in Austria-Hungary, although the family didn't use a particle in Norwegian. The Paus family belonged to the regional elite governing Upper Telemark from the early 17th century, the "aristocracy of officials" consisting of judges and priests of the state Church of Norway. He is a descendant of Peter Paus, commemorated in a Latin elegy authored by his son, Paul Paus, both 17th-century priests. His family branch settled as merchants and ship-owners in the port town of Skien in the late 18th century and were noted as millionaire steel industrialists in Christiania (Oslo) in the 19th and 20th centuries. The family were the closest relatives of playwright Henrik Ibsen, who was a first cousin of Marcus Paus's great-great-grandfather, steel industrialist Ole Paus. His grandfather and great-grandfather owned Kvesarum Castle in Sweden until 1951.

In 2019 he married the composer and singer Tirill Mohn, a former member of the art rock band White Willow and a descendant of the artists Christian Krohg and Oda Krohg; he and his wife are distantly related as both are descendants of Norway's first attorney-general Bredo Henrik von Munthe af Morgenstierne Sr.

== Career ==
Paus attended Oslo Waldorf School. As a high school student at a musical high school he was profoundly influenced by his teacher, composer Trygve Madsen. He also took two summer courses at the Musicians Institute in Hollywood in the mid-1990s. During his teenage years from the early 1990s he was active as a progressive rock guitarist, and he was recognised in The Guinness Book of Records as the world's fastest guitarist in the mid-1990s. Paus left the progressive rock scene around 1997 and was later described as "the last guitar hero."

He studied at the Norwegian Academy of Music from 1998 to 2002; at the age of 18, he became one of its youngest students ever to be accepted at its composer programme. Among his teachers were Olav Anton Thommessen. Paus made his debut as a composer in 2000 with String Quartet No. 1, based on pictures by Edvard Munch, which won the Oslo Grieg Society's award. After graduating, he left for New York City, where he studied classical composition at the Manhattan School of Music from 2003 to 2005. In New York he was a student of Richard Danielpour and spent a semester working as his assistant. Paus's breakthrough as a leading young composer came in 2008, with Missa Concertante, written for the Oslo International Church Music Festival. His first opera, The Witches, with a libretto by Ole Paus, is also from that year. In 2010, he was artistic director of the Oslo Opera Festival. Paus lived and worked in Berlin from 2011 to 2016, when he returned to Norway. Paus became a member of the Norwegian Society of Composers in 2005, and has been one of the four members of its music committee, its expert body in artistic matters, since 2019. He is represented by the management company OnwardTM.

== Musical style ==
Paus is a noted representative of a reorientation toward tradition, tonality and melody. Although often tonal and melodically driven, Paus's music employs a wide range of both traditional and modernist techniques, including aleatoricism and serial procedures. Paus's harmonic writing is typically complex, combining non-traditional structures such as clusters and symmetrical harmonic shapes with triadic harmony. Several of Paus's works have been influenced by folk music and non-Western classical music, among them Lasuliansko Horo (2004) for violin and piano (Bulgarian folk music), the flute concertino A Portrait of Zhou (2012) (Chinese music), and Fanitull (Devil's Tune) from Two Lyrical Pieces (2007) for string orchestra (Norwegian folk music). As a teenager, Marcus Paus was active as a progressive rock guitarist, and this experience is at times reflected in some of Paus's most energetic music, like the Scherzo II from his Cello Sonata (2009) and the 3rd movement, Mosh, from his Three Movements for Solo Cello (2012). Paus is also influenced by film music, and has cited John Williams as an important influence in the way he embodies dissonance and avant-garde techniques within a larger tonal framework. He is also inspired by Ravel and Shostakovich.

As a young composer in 2007, he described himself as a "cultural conservative non-modernist" in his musical style. In a 2013 interview, his views were more nuanced and he said that he is not opposed to modernism and that modernism has included important innovations and contributions, but that he supports diversity in musical styles and influences, and a "greater acceptance of a tradition-inspired musical style." Over time Paus has embraced modernist influences to a greater degree, while retaining a tonality and interest in tradition; NRK's music critic Trond Erikson wrote in 2015 that "if anyone could be called a lyrical modernist, it would be Marcus Paus" and that "Marcus Paus has shown that creating something new, exciting and beautiful is not reserved for the old masters." In a 2017 interview Paus said he felt ostracized by older atonal modernist composers in the late 1990s, but that "thankfully, the climate is quite different now, and more generous and open-minded." In 2020, Paus described himself as an "anarcho-traditionalist" who felt compelled to rebel against prejudice against traditional musical values in the 1990s and early 2000s. In 2022 he also described himself as a humanist composer, and said that although his work is often inspired by tradition, he doesn't feel bound by it. He also said that he has never been an anti-modernist. Guy Rickards has referred to Paus in Gramophone as "a successful postmodern composer."

Paus has referred to himself as a "melodist," stating that "melody is to music what a scent is to the senses: it jogs our memory. It gives face to form, and identity and character to the process and proceedings. It is not only a musical subject, but a manifestation of the musically subjective. It carries and radiates personality with as much clarity and poignancy as harmony and rhythm combined. As such a powerful tool of communication, melody serves not only as protagonist in its own drama, but as messenger from the author to the audience." He considers himself to be a "musical dramatist" or storyteller who uses his music to "empathise with something pre-existing" to convey "something that is human."

Paus has said that "words are my passion. If I weren't a composer, I would probably have endeavoured to become a poet or writer. Perhaps my father, with his love for the relation of words and music, had something to do with that (...) I set what I love, and what I cannot resist. Setting poetry is an urge (...) I think of music as subtext and symbolism." Paus is a member of the Riksmål Society and in a 2002 interview he linked his views on music to his views on language.

Frances Borowsky notes that Paus "has garnered a reputation as a prolific, versatile, and highly communicative contemporary composer" whose "works revolve around a strong appreciation for the functional use of traditional harmonies and form, combined with his uniquely idiosyncratic contemporary expressive language." Danny Riley notes that Paus is one of the "key musical figures in Norway’s modern compositional landscape" and argues that Paus's compositions might be seen as a reaction against older Norwegian contemporary composers, but that he is not a complete conservative. The musicologist Edward Green writes that Paus's music "is grounded in tradition, is steeped in the value of careful craftsmanship, and yet, at the same time, is passionate, surprising, original, deeply lyrical, and fervently humanist in its social and political orientation." Green describes Paus as "the leading Norwegian composer of his generation." The music journal Ballade has referred to Paus as omnipresent in Norwegian contemporary classical music.

== Work and collaborations ==
Known for his virtuosic and idiomatic writing, Paus has collaborated with some of Norway's finest soloists, including violinists Henning Kraggerud and Arve Tellefsen, saxophonist Rolf-Erik Nystrøm and singer Tora Augestad. Marcus Paus is also known for his collaborations with other artists, most prominently Swedish painter Christopher Rådlund, as well as singer/songwriter and poet Ole Paus (the librettist of several of Paus's operas). Other collaborators have included film director Sara Johnsen, dancer, choreographer and FRIKAR founder Hallgrim Hansegård, and actress Minken Fosheim.

Paus has set to music a number of poets and writers, among them Dorothy Parker, W. B. Yeats, Oscar Wilde, Siegfried Sassoon, Richard Wilbur, William Shakespeare, Christina Rossetti, Emily Dickinson and Anne Frank, and Norwegians André Bjerke, Jens Bjørneboe, Arne Garborg, Knut Hamsun, Johan Falkberget, Harald Sverdrup and Ole Paus.

All of Paus's four string quartets to date are themed after painters (nos. 1 and 4 on paintings by Edvard Munch, no. 2 on a painting by Halfdan Egedius, and no. 3 on paintings by Christopher Rådlund).

Paus's choral work The Stolen Child (2009), based on poetry by William Butler Yeats, was one of his early works to receive international critical acclaim. Written for Ensemble 96, it was included on their album Kind (2010) which presented Nordic choral music, and which was nominated for the Grammy Award for Best Choral Performance. Stephen Eddins wrote that Paus's work is "sumptuously lyrical and magically wild, and [...] beautifully captures the alluring mystery and danger and melancholy" of Yeats. Kirk McElhearn wrote that "it presents a sound-world that is astounding and moving."

Paus's The Beauty That Still Remains, based on original text by Anne Frank, was commissioned by the Government of Norway for the official Norwegian commemoration of the end of the Second World War in 2015; released as a studio album by 2L in 2020, it received critical acclaim. Guy Rickards noted in Gramophone that the work "takes its title from one of the most famous, defiant, and affecting quotes from The Diary of Anne Frank: 'I do not think about all the misery, but about all the beauty that still remains.' The sentiment of that quote, its focus on the positive in a time of dire peril, is the pillar around which Marcus Paus' extraordinarily beautiful cantata is constructed, encapsulated in the last of its eleven movements, Epilogue, setting those very words in an outpouring of melody that is captivating and heartbreaking in equal measure. (...) This is quite the finest work by Marcus Paus that I have heard."

Paus's Concerto for Timpani and Orchestra, written for the 250th anniversary of Bergen Philharmonic Orchestra, triggered the biggest public debate about art music in Norway since the 1970s with a large number of articles by Norwegian composers in the music journal Ballade on its aesthetics and the future of contemporary music. Danny Riley argued that "it’s tempting to view its instrumental pyrotechnics as a remnant from Paus's days shredding guitar in prog rock groups as a teenager."

In 2017, the album Marcus Paus – Odes & Elegies was released by Sheva Contemporary, featuring his works A Portrait of Zhou, Marble Songs, Shostakovich in Memoriam, Vita and Love's Last Rites, performed by Tom Ottar Andreassen, the Norwegian Radio Orchestra, Henning Kraggerud, Oslo Camerata directed by Stephan Barratt-Due and others. The album received critical acclaim.

Musicologist Ralph P. Locke wrote that Paus's Hate Songs, based on poetry by Dorothy Parker, "proved to be one of the most engaging works" in recent years; "the cycle expresses Parker's favorite theme: how awful human beings are, especially the male of the species." In 2018, Tora Augestad and the Oslo Philharmonic released the album Portraying Passion: Works by Weill/Paus/Ives, with works by Kurt Weill and Charles Ives in addition to Paus's Hate Songs, and the album won the 2018 Spellemannprisen (Norwegian Grammy Award) for best classical album. Locke highlighted Augestad's recording of Hate Songs as one of the "best opera and vocal music" works in that year. Albrecht Thiemann, editor of Opernwelt, called the work "a captivatingly orchestrated, spirit-sparkling opus" and "a coup that provides an immense listening pleasure."

His work for children include the children's operas The Witches, based on Roald Dahl, and The Ash-Lad – Pål's Story, both written in collaboration with his father Ole Paus. His children's opera Children of Ginko premiered in Shanghai in 2020 as part of the Ibsen International project supported by the Norwegian Foreign Ministry.

His work also includes church music, including the widely performed O Magnum Mysterium (2007), Missa Concertante (2008) and Requiem (2014), the latter written with his father Ole Paus. The German music critic Jan Brachmann wrote in the Frankfurter Allgemeine Zeitung that Paus's O Magnum Mysterium translates "the harmonious language from soundtracks for mystery thrillers into pious devotion, almost based on the maxim: 'You, Christmas are like a David Lynch film, but with a happy ending and no deaths.'"

In 2018 Julie Kleive and Joachim Kwetzinsky released the album En hellig, alminnelig lek (A Sacred, Ordinary Game) with songs by Paus based on poetry by André Bjerke. In 2020 Kleive and Kwetzinsky released the album Dypt i forledelsen (Deep in Seduction) with songs by Paus based on poetry by Jens Bjørneboe. Music critic Maren Ørstavik described the latter as "a solid, modern song cycle" written with "a sense of singable melodies, classical forms and traditional instrumentation" and noted that "it is interesting to compare the two works, which demonstrate that Paus is an original composer despite the conventional forms and instrumentation."

In 2020, Paus released the song cycle Good Vibes in Bad Times, written for mezzo-soprano Tora Augestad based on texts by Donald Trump reconceptualized as poems. Paus said that "more than being merely a satirical take on Trump (which, of course, it obviously is), these texts offer a humanizing perspective, allowing us to take pity where reality otherwise leaves little room for it."

In a review of Paus's film score for Mortal (2020), Jonathan Broxton wrote that the work is "likely to be remembered as the breakthrough of a superb ‘new’ talent because if this is any indication of his work, he's going to be massive very soon." Paus was nominated for the 2020 Movie Music UK Awards; Broxton wrote that Paus, "who is already considered a wunderkind in classical circles – blew me away with the score for the super-hero fantasy/horror Mortal." Paus was also nominated for an Amanda Award and as the Norwegian nominee for the 2021 Nordic Film Music Days – HARPA Award for the work; the HARPA jury described it as "an impressively mature orchestral work that feels both introvert and extrovert at the same time, painting its fantastical canvas in broad, impressionistic strokes." Daniel Schweiger described Mortal as "truly thunderstruck in announcing Paus’ symphonically avenging talent to a bigger playing field."

In 2020, Paus' work Ingenting forsvinner (Nothing Disappears), with lyrics by Ole Paus, was first performed by NyNorsk Brass Quintet and Tora Augestad; Paus described the work as "equal parts epitaph, confession, prayer and threat." In 2021, the guitar concerto Decameron and the violin concerto Voyage were first performed by the Norwegian Arctic Philharmonic Orchestra with soloists Petter Richter and Miriam Helms Ålien. In 2021, the tuba concerto Tuba Mirum was first performed by tubist August Schieldrop and the Oslo Philharmonic.

The double album Cabin Fever: Pandemic Works (Sheva Contemporary, 2022) contains new works written during the corona pandemic, performed by the Norwegian Arctic Philharmonic Orchestra and various musicians. The album Requiem/Trisyn/Læreren som ikke ble (2022) notably contains Requiem by Marcus and Ole Paus and The Teacher Who Was Not To Be by Paus and Olav Anton Thommessen.

In 2022 the Norwegian Armed Forces commissioned Paus to write a major work to tell the stories of the recipients of Norway's highest honour, the War Cross. The Armed Forces said the idea is that the work will be a major "identity-building and unifying" work for the armed forces. It was the largest commission in the history of Norwegian military music. During the Russian invasion of Ukraine that year, Paus composed the song "Slava Ukraini!," that he described as a song of resistance. Paus said that "the work seems to strike a chord with many people, including those who are in the middle of the battle zone. There is no nobler task for music than to unite and comfort people."

Paus has expressed interest in writing an opera based on Ibsen's Peer Gynt.

== Other activities ==
From 2021 Paus co-hosts the podcast Paus og Castle blir kloke på musikklivet (Paus and Castle Figure Out Music Life) with his brother-in-law, punk and rap musician and music producer Kim Morten Mohn (also known by the stage name Kim Castle). Paus performed an electric guitar solo on the 2021 single "Mamman og Pappans Anthem (feat. Marcus Paus)" released by electronic duo detdusa; it was Paus' first appearance as a performer since the 1990s.

== Selected works ==
Orchestral works

- The War Cross (Krigskorset) (2023), written for the Norwegian Armed Forces
- Tuba Mirum (2021), written for the Oslo Philharmonic and tubist August Schieldrop
- Decameron: Concerto Rifugio (2020)
- Love's Last Rites (2017)
- Concerto for Timpani and Orchestra (2015), written for the Bergen Philharmonic Orchestra
- Hate Songs for Mezzo-soprano & Orchestra (2013–14), text: Dorothy Parker
- Music for Orchestra (2012)
- A Portrait of Zhou (Concertino for Flute & Orchestra) (2012)
- Triple Concerto for Violin, Viola & Orchestra (2011)
- Two Lyrical Pieces (2007)
- Ave Mozart! (2006)

Choral works

- Litanies (2021), text by Siegfried Sassoon
- No Search, No Rescue (2017), text by Palestinian poet Jehan Bseiso
- The Day of Wrath Shall Come (2017), text by Thomas of Celano
- Free is the Land (2016), text by Ole Paus
- The Beauty That Still Remains (2015), libretto by the composer based on The Diary of a Young Girl by Anne Frank
- Dies Irae (2014), text by Heidi Køhn
- And Now Abide (2012)
- The Stolen Child (2009), text: W. B. Yeats
- Missa Concertante (2008)
- O magnum mysterium (2007)
- The Dome & the River (2006)

Operas and stage works

- Children of Ginko / Frøbarna (2017–18), chamber opera in one act, libretto by Oda Fiskum
- Hate Songs for Mezzo-soprano & Orchestra (2013–14), text: Dorothy Parker
- Spelet om Christian Frederik (2014)
- Eli Sjursdotter (2013–14), libretto by Ola Jonsmoen
- The Teacher Who Was Not To Be (Læreren som ikke ble) (2013), libretto by the teacher who was not to be (Olav Anton Thommessen)
- The Ash-Lad – Pål's Story (Askeladden – Påls versjon) (2010–11), libretto by Ole Paus, based on the fairy tale character Askeladden
- The Wild Choir (2009), text by Knut Hamsun
- The Witches (Heksene) (2007–08), libretto by Ole Paus, based on the novel of the same name by Roald Dahl

Chamber works

- Two Eldritch Songs for Voice (Tenor) & Piano (2021)
- Fragments from Sappho (2020)
- Sonata for Violin & Piano (2020)
- Songs from Shiraz (2020)
- The Song and the Catastrophe (2018), text by Ulrik Farestad
- Confessions (2018), text by André Bjerke
- Never (2017), text by André Bjerke
- Everyday Miracle (2017), text by André Bjerke
- Room Mates (2017), text by Ulrik Farestad
- Late Summer Songs (2017), text by Jan Erik Vold
- The Yearning of Things (2017), text by André Bjerke
- Love Songs (2016), text by Dorothy Parker
- Music to Hear (Sonnet VIII) (2016), text by William Shakespeare
- Sonata for Double Bass and Piano (2016)
- The Harvesting (2016), text by Edvard Munch
- Afterplay: Eternity's Gaze (2015), text by Ole Paus
- Fanfare for Two Violins (2015)
- Requiem (2014), text by Ole Paus
- Screwing Britten (2013)
- String Quartet no. 4 ‘Ashes’ (2013)
- Sonata for Cello & Piano (2009)
- String Quartet no.3 (2006)
- Trio for Clarinet, Violin & Piano (2006)
- Lasuliansko Horo for Violin & Piano (2004)

Solo works

- Slava Ukraini! (2022; composed during the 2022 Russian invasion of Ukraine)
- Good Vibes in Bad Times (2020)
- Decameron: Concerto Rifugio (2020)
- Intimations (2020)
- Cabin Fever (2020)
- The Waters of Vinje (Souvenir d'un Voyage) (2019)
- Intrada for Solo Oboe (2018)
- Kleiberg Variations for Solo Piano (2018)
- Mathias' Song for Solo Piano (2018)
- Sarabande for Solo Clavichord (2018)
- Stetind (2018)
- Alone for Solo Cello (2017)
- September Lines for Solo Clarinet (2017)
- Sonata for Solo Clarinet (2017)
- Christiania, 1899 for Solo Piano (2016)
- Elegy for Solo Alto Recorder (or Oboe) (2016)
- Hauntings for Solo Flute (2016)
- Marble Songs (2016)
- Prowling (2016)
- Sonata for Solo Bassoon (2016)
- Three Lines (2016)
- Two Idylls (2016)
- Two Pieces for Solo Harpsichord (2016)
- A Prologue to the Past (2015)
- Inventory (2015), text by Dorothy Parker
- Summer Sketches (2015)
- Theory (2015), text by Dorothy Parker
- A Farther Front (2014)
- Sur le nom de Bach (2014)
- Vita (2014)
- Three Shades of Evil (2013)
- Trauermusik for Solo Cello (2012)
- 4 Memento Mori for Solo Piano (2012)
- The Ladies on the Bridge for Solo Violin (2010)

Film scores

- Rex Barbaricum (documentary series)
- Mortal (2020), directed by André Øvredal
- UMEÅ4ever (2011), directed by Geir Greni
- Upperdog (2009), directed by Sara Johnsen

== Selected discography ==
- Ensemble 96s: Kind (2L, 2010) (The Stolen Child)
- UMEÅ4ever (MTG Music, 2011)
- Henning Kraggerud: Munch Suite (Simax 2013)
- Johannes Martens and Joachim Kwetzinsky: Marcus Paus (Aurora 2013)
- Bergen Philharmonic Orchestra: OPUS 250 (LAWO Classics, 2015) (Concerto for Timpani and Orchestra)
- Tom Ottar Andreassen, the Norwegian Radio Orchestra, Henning Kraggerud, Oslo Camerata directed by Stephan Barratt-Due and others: Marcus Paus – Odes & Elegies (Sheva Contemporary, 2017)
- Tora Augestad and the Oslo Philharmonic: Portraying Passion: Works by Weill/Paus/Ives (LAWO Classics, 2018)
- Julie Kleive and Joachim Kwetzinsky: En hellig, alminnelig lek [A Sacred, Ordinary Game] (Grappa Musikkforlag, 2018)
- Norwegian Girls' Choir: The Beauty That Still Remains (2L, 2020)
- Julie Kleive and Joachim Kwetzinsky: Dypt i forledelsen [Deep in Seduction] (MTG Music, 2020)
- Mortal (MTG Music, 2020)
- Zurich Chamber Singers: O Nata Lux (Berlin Classics, 2020) (O Magnum Mysterium)
- Good Vibes in Bad Times (MTG Music, 2020)
- Sonata for Violin and Piano (Sheva Contemporary, 2021)
- Cabin Fever: Pandemic Works (Sheva Contemporary, 2022)
- Requiem/Trisyn/Læreren som ikke ble (2022), with Requiem by Marcus Paus/Ole Paus, and The Teacher Who Was Not To Be by Marcus Paus/Olav Anton Thommessen

== Awards ==
- Wessel Prize, 2012
- Composer of the Year Prize (won) of the Norwegian Music Publishers, 2017
- Amanda Award for Best Music (nominated), 2020
- Breakthrough Composer of the Year, Movie Music UK Awards (nominated), 2020
- Nordic Film Music Days – HARPA Award (Norwegian nominee), 2021
- Government Grant for Artists, 2021
- Composer of the Year Prize (nominated) of the Norwegian Music Publishers, 2022
- Work of the Year Prize (nominated) of the Norwegian Music Publishers, 2022
