= Ralph P. Locke =

American musicologist, classical music critic and professor emeritus

- Born: 1949 (age 76–77)

Academic background
- Education: Harvard University; University of Chicago

Academic work
- Institutions: Eastman School of Music
- Main interests: Musicology

Ralph P. Locke (born 1949) is an American musicologist, classical music critic and professor emeritus of musicology at Eastman School of Music. He founded the University of Rochester Press Eastman Studies in Music series in 1994 and is the senior series editor. He is a contributor to a number of reference works, including the New Grove Dictionary of Music and Musicians, New Grove Dictionary of American Music, New Grove Dictionary of Opera, New Harvard Dictionary of Music, New Grove Dictionary of Women Composers, American National Biography, Encyclopedia of New England Culture, and Encyclopaedia Britannica. He is an editorial board member of Journal of Musicological Research, Ad Parnassum: a Journal of Eighteenth and Nineteenth Century Music, Nineteenth Century Music Review, and Journal of Music History Pedagogy. He is also "one of the most published musicologists on orientalism and music." Locke earned his BA at Harvard University and his PhD at the University of Chicago.

== Selected bibliography ==
- Music and the Exotic from the Renaissance to Mozart, Cambridge University Press, 2015
- Musical Exoticism: Images and Reflections, Cambridge University Press, 2009
- Cultivating Music in America: Women Patrons and Activists since 1860, University of California Press, 1997
- Music, Musicians, and the Saint-Simonians, University of Chicago Press, 1986
