= Åsmund =

Åsmund or Aasmund is a Norse male given name, derived from as ('god') and mundr ('protector'). People with the given name Åsmund or Aasmund include:

- Asmund, Varangian tutor of Sviatoslav I of Kiev (945–972)
- Åsmund Asdal (born 1957), Norwegian biologist
- Aasmund Bjørkan (born 1973), retired Norwegian football midfielder
- Aasmund Brynildsen (1917–1974), Norwegian essayist, biographer, editor and consultant
- Roald Åsmund Bye (born 1928), Norwegian politician for the Labour Party
- Åsmund Esval (born 1889), Norwegian painter
- Åsmund Forfang (born 1952), Norwegian writer
- Åsmund Frægdegjevar, medieval Norwegian legendary hero who is hired by the king to rescue a princess
- Åsmund Kåresson, runemaster who flourished during the first half of the 11th century in Uppland, Sweden
- Aasmund Kulien (1893–1988), Norwegian politician for the Labour Party
- Aasmund Nordstoga (born 1964), Norwegian musician, singer and composer from Vinje, Telemark
- Aasmund Olavsson Vinje (1818–1870), Norwegian poet and journalist
- Åsmund Reikvam (born 1944), Norwegian professor in medicine and former politician
- Aasmund Halvorsen Vinje (1851–1917), Norwegian politician for the Liberal Party splinter party Liberale Venstre

== See also ==
- Asmund, eponymous hero of the saga Ásmundar saga kappabana
- Åsmund Åmli Band, Norwegian country/rock band from Valle in Setesdalen, formed in 1996
- Åsmund Frægdegjevar (album), the first full-length album by the Norwegian folk metal band Lumsk
