= Oslo String Quartet =

Norwegian musical group

Oslo String Quartet was formed in 1991 by Geir Inge Lotsberg and Per Kristian Skalstad (violins), Are Sandbakken (viola), and Øystein Sonstad (cello). It was among the 1994 prize winners of the London International String Competition, which is among the most prestigious string quartet competitions internationally. In 2007 Skalstad left the quartet in order to pursue a conducting career. Liv Hilde Klokk replaced him at the start of 2008. The quartet regularly at music festivals in Scandinavia and elsewhere, including Wigmore Hall in London and Carnegie Hall in New York. The quartet was awarded Komponistforeningens pris (the Prize of the Norwegian Association of Composers) in 1998 and the Kritikerprisen (the Norwegian Critics Prize for Music) for 1999–2000. Their CD recordings of Carl Nielsen's quartets won them a 1999 "Editor's Choice" nomination in the international journal The Gramophone, which stated, "Artistically it is the finest at any price point ... totally dedicated, idiomatic performance ... full of vitality and spirit and refreshingly straightforward".

Their CD recordings include music by Edvard Grieg, David Monrad Johansen, Knut Nystedt, Klaus Egge, Fartein Valen, Johan Kvandal, Alfred Janson, Carl Nielsen, Magnar Åm, Lasse Thoresen, Ragnar Søderlind, Johan Svendsen, Jean Sibelius, Hugo Wolf, Ketil Stokkan, and Alban Berg.

To mark their 15-years anniversary, the quartet staged a two-week The Beethoven Code project in November 2006, where all of Beethoven's string quartets were performed over eight concerts, in the library building at the University of Oslo. An integral part of this series of concerts was a string of lectures by prominent scholars on various aspects of Beethoven's life and the impact of his music. The Beethoven Code project also included the making, and screening of the film Brødrene Gahl og jakten på Beethovenkoden, conceived, librettoed and directed by Sonstad, and featuring the four musicians as actors. The film depicts the spiritual and existential fight and plight of Beethoven's four illegitimate children, who use the power of Große Fuge against the dark Tahitian forces of bratsjismen (violist).

Violist Magnus Boye Hansen joined the quartet in 2018.

== Releases ==
- Edvard Grieg og David Monrad Johansen: String quartets (Naxos 8.550879)
- Knut Nystedt, String quartets no. 2-5 (Simax PSC 1114,1995)
- Norwegian 20th century string quartets (Naxos 8.554384). Works by Fartein Valen, Klaus Egge, Johan Kvandal and Alfred Janson.
- Carl Nielsen: String quartets (Naxos, two volums. NAXOS 8.553907 and NAXOS 8.553908). Editor's Choice in Gramophon.
- The silver cord (Aurora, ACD5028. 2002). Works by Lasse Thoresen, Ragnar Söderlind og Magnar Åm
- Johan Svendsen: Op. 1 and 5 (CPO 999858. 2001)
- "Voces intimae" (CPO 999977–2. 2002). Jean Sibelius, Hugo Wolf og Alban Berg.
- «Faller oppover». (Fabra, FBRCD-02. 2003) Pop, jazz and Latin.
- Wilhelm Stenhammar: String quartets no. 3-6 (CPO, 7774262. Double cd/sacd 2006/07)
- «Jumping Wide» (Fabra FBRCD-08, 2010) Crossover
- Grieg Revisited (Fabra, FBRCD-06. 2010) Bergljot, String Quartet in F-major (completed by Ø Sonstad), Ballade
- The Schubert Connection, (2L93. 2012) Schubert: Death and the Maiden, Grieg: String Quartet in g-minor
- minor major, (2L135. 2015). Schubert: G-Major, Beethoven f-minor, opus 95.
- Archive. (Fabra FBRCD-17, 2020) Works by Hvoslef, Nordheim, Wallin and Åm.

== Members ==
- Geir Inge Lotsberg, violin
- Liv Hilde Klokk (since 2008); Per Kristian Skalstad (until 2007), violin
- Magnus Boye Hansen (since 2018); Are Sandbakken (before 2018), viola
- Øystein Sonstad, cello
