= Kvandal =

Kvandal is a Norwegian surname. Notable people with the surname include:

- Eirin Maria Kvandal (born 2001), Norwegian ski jumper
- Johan Kvandal (1919–1999), Norwegian composer
- Lilleba Lund Kvandal (1940–2016), Norwegian soprano singer
