= Asdal =

Asdal may refer to:

== People ==
- Åsmund Asdal (born 1957), a Norwegian biologist and agronomist, employed at Nordic Genetic Resource Center (NordGen) as Svalbard Global Seed Vault (SGSV).

== Places ==
- Asdal (village), a village in the municipality of Arendal in Aust-Agder county, Norway
- Asdal, North Jutland, a village in Hjørring Municipality in the North Denmark Region of Denmark

== Other ==
- ASDAL, the Association of Seventh-day Adventist Librarians
