= Eidsborg =

Village in Tokke Municipality, Norway

- Village
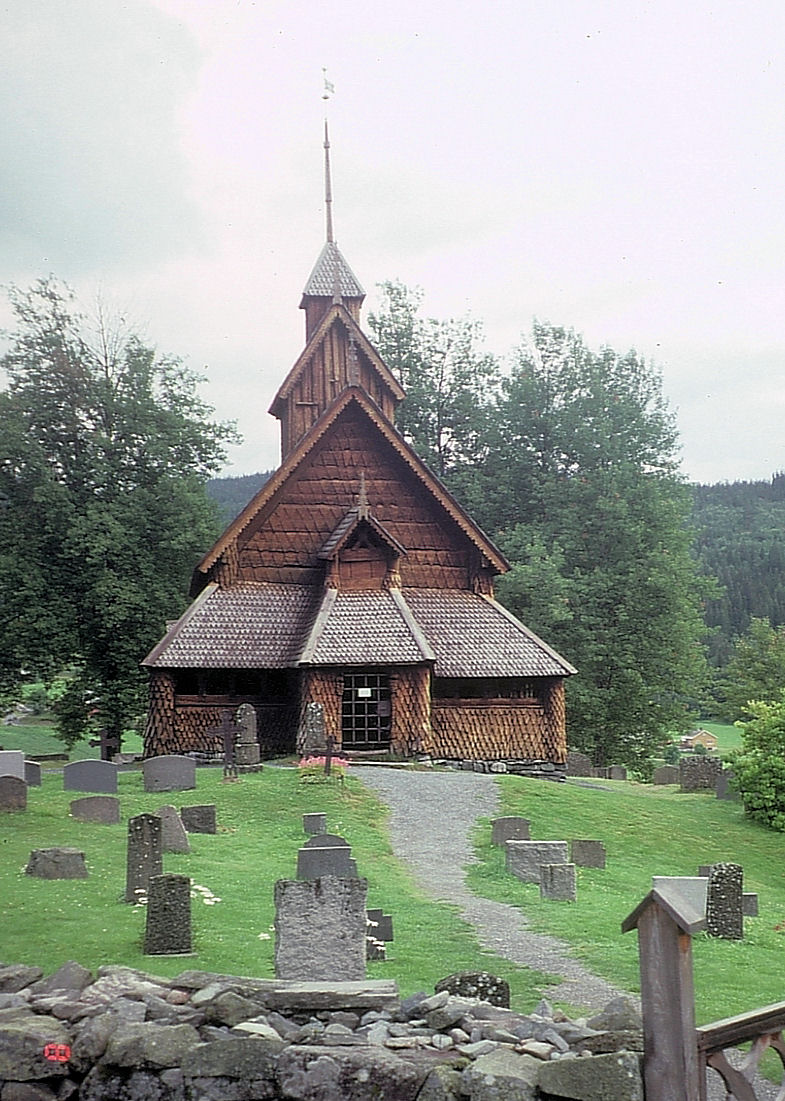
- View of the Eidsborg Stave Church in the village
- Interactive map of Eidsborg
- Coordinates: 59.46233°N 8.02518°E
- Country: Norway
- Region: Eastern Norway
- County: Telemark
- District: Vest-Telemark
- Municipality: Tokke Municipality
- Elevation: 515 m (1,690 ft)
- Time zone: UTC+01:00 (CET)
  - Summer (DST): UTC+02:00 (CEST)
- Post Code: 3891 Høydalsmo

Eidsborg is a village in Tokke Municipality in Telemark county, Norway. The village is located about 3 kilometres (1.9 mi) north of the village of Dalen and the lake Bandak. The village lies in a bowl-shaped valley, surrounded by forests.

The 13th-century Eidsborg Stave Church is located in the village. The village is also the site of the Vest-Telemark Museum. Vindlausloftet was built around 1167 and it was originally located on the Vindlaus farm. It is now located the museum and it is the oldest secular wooden building in Norway.

For hundreds of years, there was a quarry at Eidsborg. Stones were turned into whetstones and then they were transported to Skien on the ice during the winter and then loaded on ships to send to other markets.

Anne Lillegaard's version of the visionary poem Draumkvedet was written down by folklorist Jørgen Moe during a visit to Eidsborg in 1847. Lillegaard also contributed a large number of traditional songs.

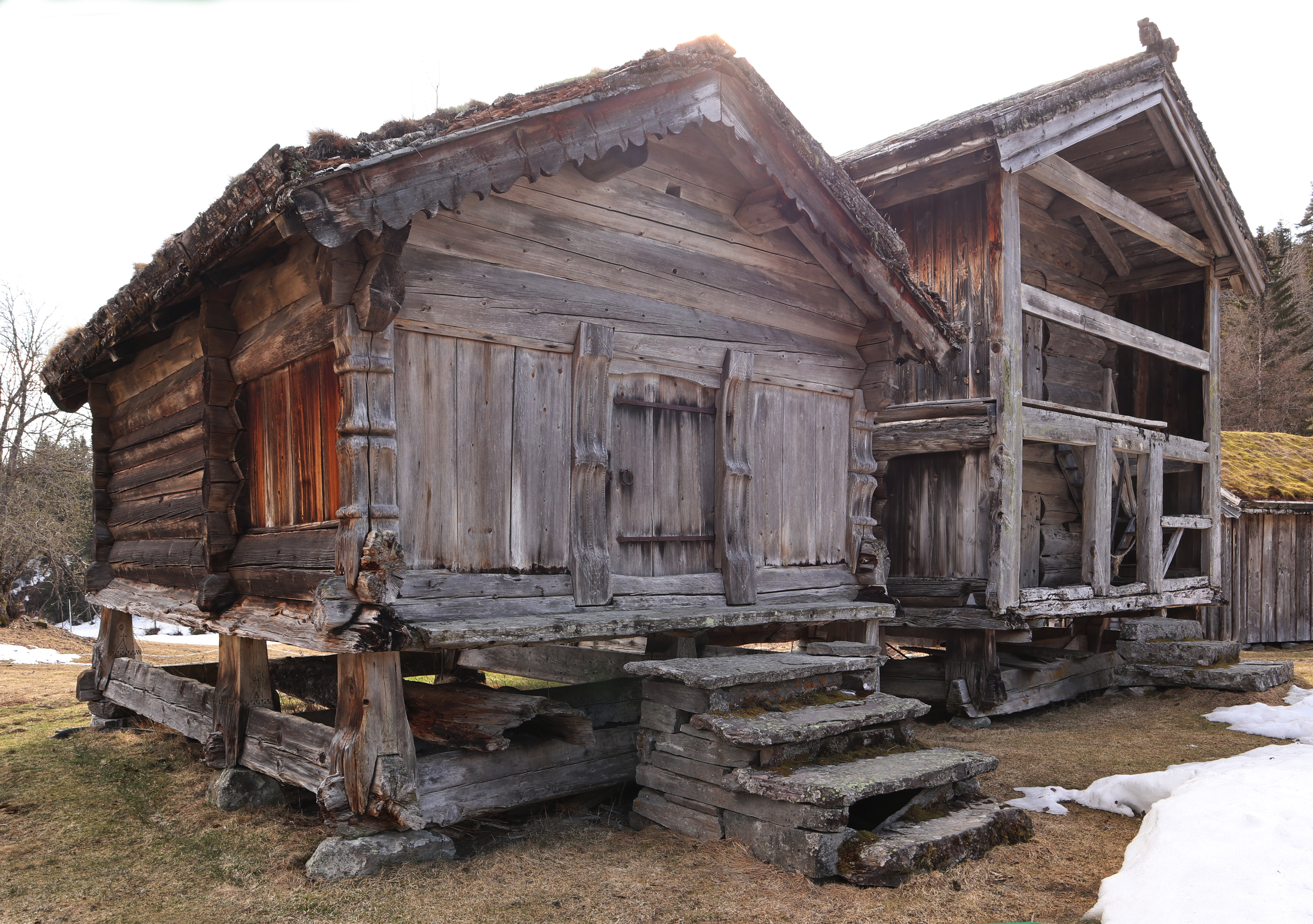
Vindlausloftet – oldest secular building in Norway

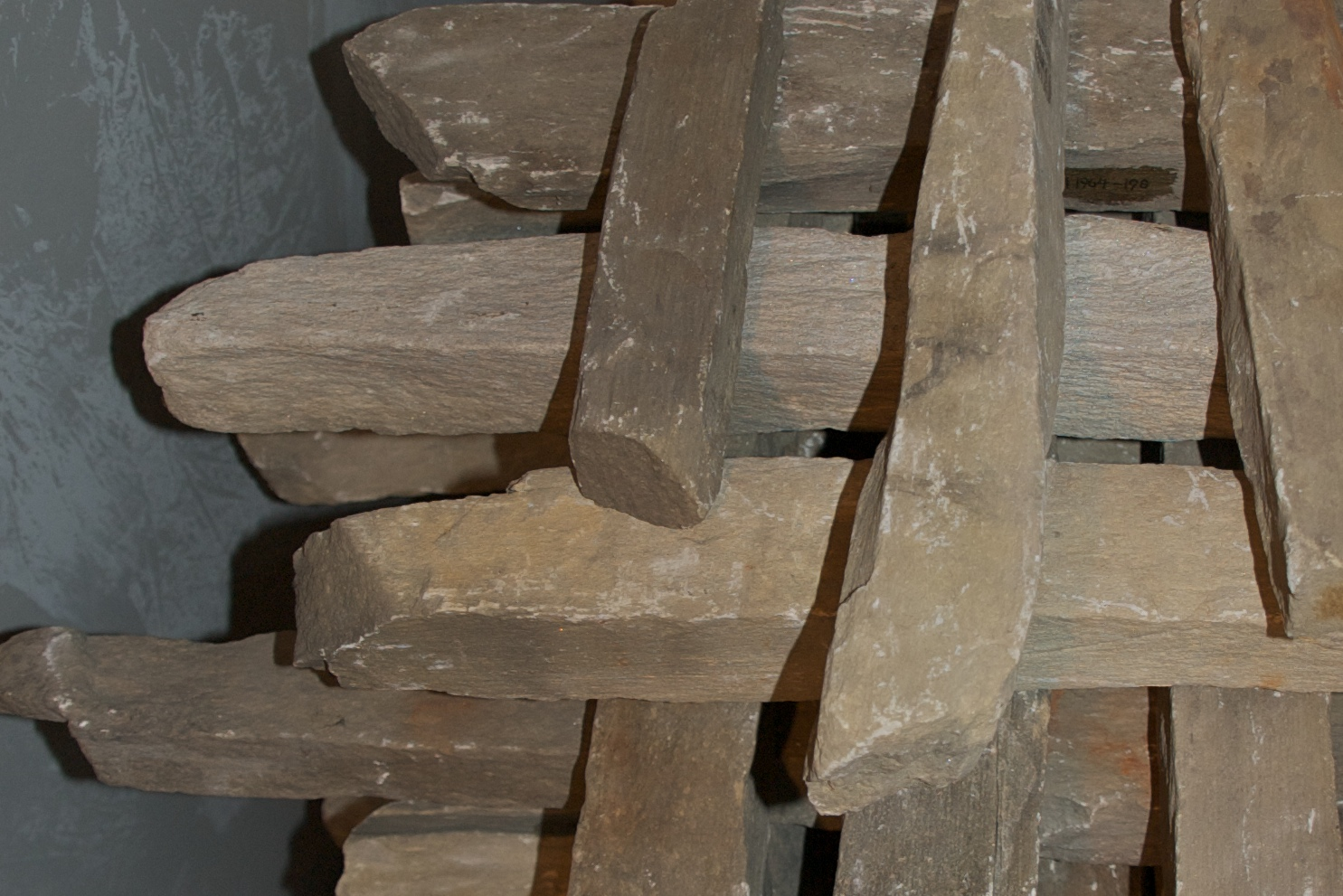
Whetstones from Eidsborg

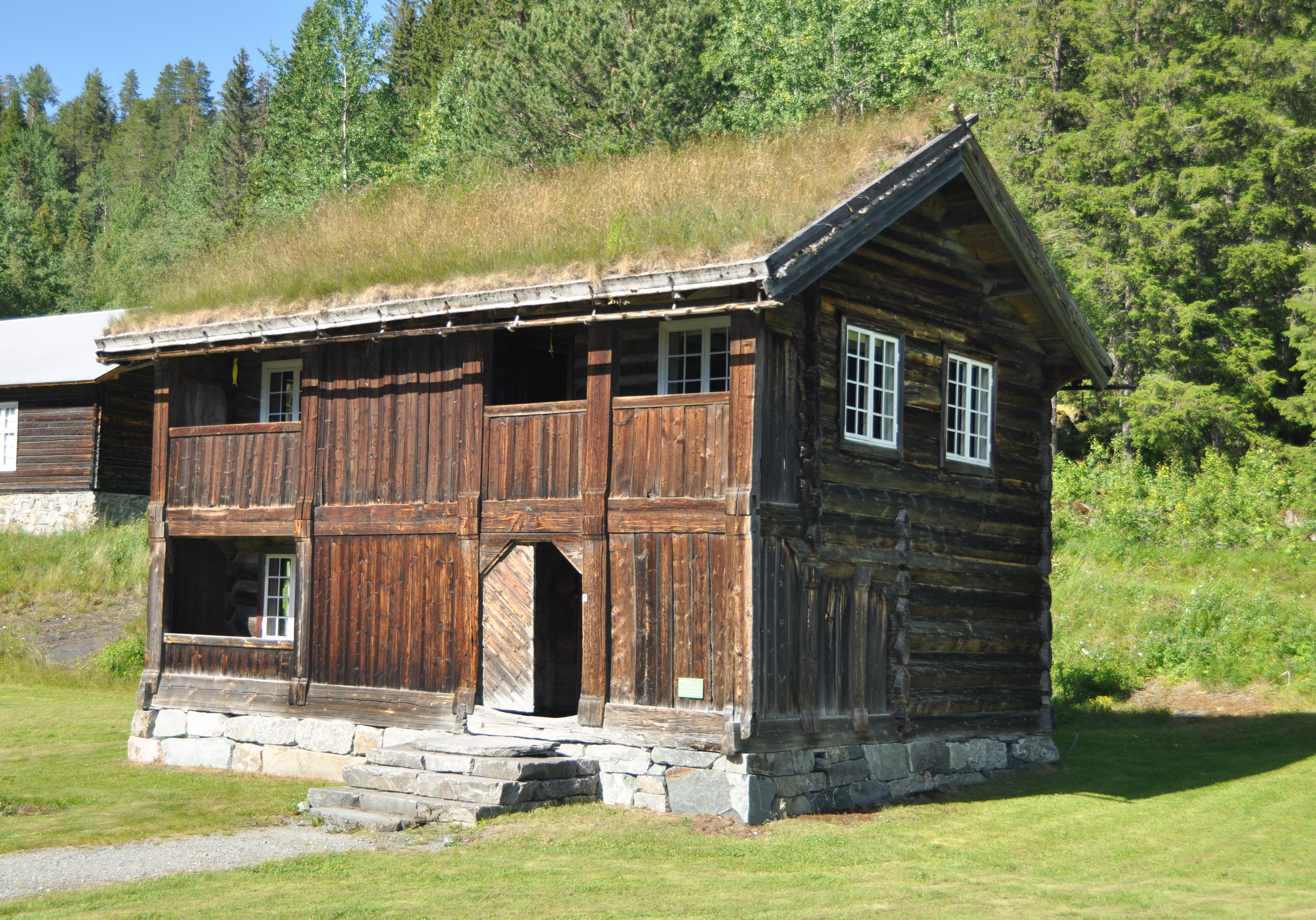
Building at the Vest-Telemark Museum
