= Reikvam =

Reikvam is a Norwegian surname. Notable people with the surname include:

- Åsmund Reikvam (born 1944), Norwegian scientist and politician
- Rolf Reikvam (born 1948), Norwegian politician
