= Det Vilde Kor (Lumsk) =

Studio album by Lumsk
- Released: February 26, 2007
- Recorded: September 2006
- Genres: Progressive rock, Lullaby
- Label: Tabu Recordings

Lumsk chronology
Troll (2005)	Det Vilde Kor (2007)

Det Vilde Kor is the third full-length album by the Norwegian folk metal band Lumsk. It was released on February 26, 2007 by Tabu Recordings. The lyrics are taken from Knut Hamsun's similarly titled poetry collection of 1904.

== Track listing ==
1. "Diset Kvæld" – 3:04
2. "Om Hundrede Aar er Alting glemt" – 6:31
3. "Høstnat" – 3:38
4. "Paa Hvælvet" – 2:50
5. "Lad Spille med Vaar over Jorden" – 3:22
6. "Duttens Vise" – 3:22
7. "Svend Herlufsens Ord, del I Min Kærest er som den" – 2:37
8. "Svend Herlufsens Ord, del II Og du vil vide" – 2:23
9. "Svend Herlufsens Ord, del III Jeg har det" – 1:50
10. "Svend Herlufsens Ord, del IV Se, Natten er Livet" – 4:35
11. "Godnat Herinde" – 3:29
12. "Skærgaardsø" – 2:45

== Personnel ==
- Stine Mari Langstrand – Vocals
- Vidar Berg – Drums
- Ketil Sæther – Guitar
- Espen Warankov Godø – Piano, Hammond, Synthesizer
- Eystein Garberg – Guitar
- Siv Lena Waterloo Laugtug – Violin
- Espen Hammer – Bass Guitar
