= Forfang =

Forfang is a Norwegian surname. Notable people with the surname include:

- Åsmund Forfang (born 1952), Norwegian writer
- Daniel Forfang (born 1979), Norwegian ski jumper
- Halvard Grude Forfang (1914–1987), Norwegian educator
- Johann André Forfang (born 1995), Norwegian ski jumper
- Ole Forfang (born 1995), Norwegian cyclist
