= Åsmund Frægdegjevar =

Norwegian folk song

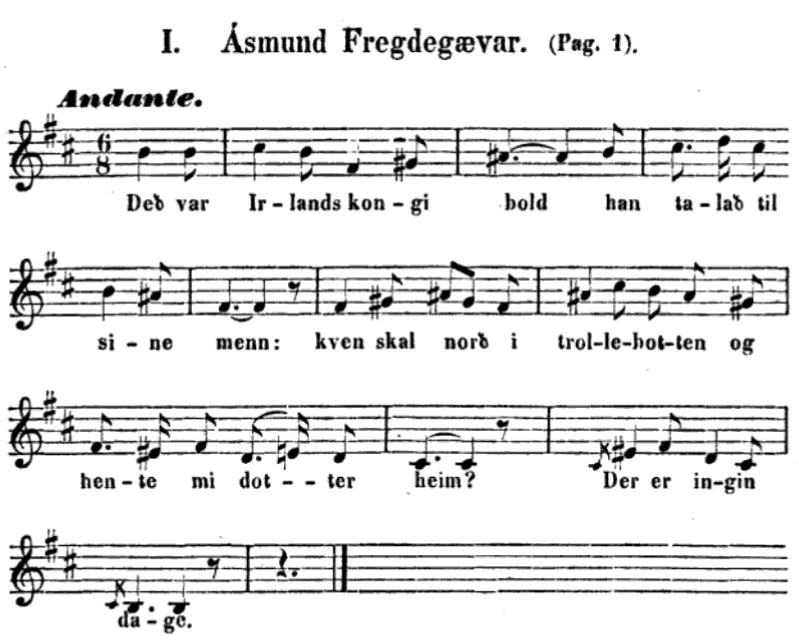
Åsmund Frægdegjeva (1853) by Magnus Brostrup Landstad

Åsmund Frægdegjevar is a medieval Norwegian legend and ballad (classification: TSB E 145) with several variations all detailing the adventures of a hero by the same name who is hired by the king to rescue a princess. It is based on a fornaldarsaga.

== Summary ==
The story begins as many fairytales do: the fair princess has been captured and imprisoned in a faraway castle, and the King commissions a hero, in this case Åsmund, to rescue her. He and his brothers take the King's flagship Ormin Lange to the castle of the ogre Skomegyvri, where the princess is imprisoned. However, his brothers will not enter with him, so he goes alone.

He finds the princess with relative ease walking through the castle, and immediately falls in love with her. But she is under a spell of the ogre, and believing that Skomegyvri is her mother, will not leave with him. He then takes her by force.

On his way out, the ogre appears. They fight a long battle both physically and with curses and spells, but Åsmund eventually kills Skomegyvri. The princess being free from the spell, they plunder the castle and return home with all the ogre's treasure.

== Parallels ==
The ballad tells a similar story to an Icelandic saga (Ásmundar saga flagðagæfu, extant only as the fragmentary Ásmundar rímur flagðagæfu), where the hero is known as Ásmundur Flagðagæfa.

== Recordings ==
Åsmund Frægdegjevar by Lumsk is a concept album based on the ballad.

Jan Inge Rasmussen recount the ballad in his version of the song "Åsmund Frægdegjæva" on the album from 1975 Rasmusikk

Gåte recount the ballad in their song "Åsmund Frægdegjæva" on the album Svevn.

== English Translations ==
English translations of this ballad have been published:

- "Åsmund Frægdegjeva" in The Faraway North (2016) by Ian Cumpstey.
- Waggoner, Ben (2010). Sagas of Giants and Heroes. New Haven, CT: Troth Publications. ISBN 978-0578059334. (from the summary Inntak úr söguþætti af Ásmundi flagðagæfu: Tale of Asmund Ogre-Lucky, pp. 151-164)

== Adaptations ==
A series of ten tapestries illustrating scenes from Åsmund Frægdegjevar was woven by Ragna Breivik from 1923 to 1949, based on drawings by Gerhard Munthe. The tapestry series is now housed in the Bryggens Museum in Bergen.
