= Draumkvedet =

Norwegian medieval ballad

"Draumkvedet" (lit. 'The Dream Poem'; NMB 54, TSB B 31) is a Norwegian visionary poem, probably dated from the late medieval age. It is one of the best known medieval ballads in Norway. The first written versions are from Lårdal Municipality and Kviteseid Municipality in Telemark in the 1840s.

The protagonist, Olav Åsteson, falls asleep on Christmas Eve and sleeps until the thirteenth day of Christmas. Then he wakes, and rides to church to recount his dreams to the congregation, about his journey through the afterlife. The events are in part similar to other medieval ballads like the Lyke Wake Dirge: a moor of thorns, a tall bridge, and a black fire. After these, the protagonist is also allowed to see Hell and some of Heaven. The poem concludes with specific advice of charity and compassion, to avoid the various trials of the afterlife.

== Musical Settings ==
The poem was set to music by several Norwegian composers:

- David Monrad Johansen is perhaps the first composer to treat the poem text musically with his op. 7 for male choir from the 1920s.
- His son, Johan Kvandal wrote his "Draumkvædet" op. 15 in 1955, based on the Draumkvedet texts and melodies. This work is available in two versions, one for soprano solo and mixed choir with piano/ organ and another for soprano, mixed choir, flute, clarinet, bassoon, horn, viola, cello and double bass. It has been recorded by Bergen Domkantori (Bergen Digitalstudio BD7011).
- Eivind Groven made a composition for soloists, choir and symphony orchestra in 1963. The work is available on CD (Aurora 1988).
- Harald Gundhus arranged the poem for tenor saxophone, flute (performed by him), hardingfele (performed by Knut Buen), Celtic harp (performed by Warren Carlstrøm) and organ (performed by Kåre Nordstoga), the poem proper being sung by Agnes Buen Garnås. It was recorded at Gjerpen Kyrkje, 5–7 June 1984, for the Kirkelig Kulturverksted label.
- Arne Nordheim set it to music in 1994 as Draumkvedet (The Dream Ballad). He scored it for solo singing voices, speakers, Hardanger fiddle, electronics, chorus and orchestra. The work was composed in honor of the millennium of the city of Trondheim in 1997. It was recorded in 2001 and released on a two-CD set in 2006.
- Ola Gjeilo wrote a version for choir, piano, and string orchestra, which premiered in May 2014. The words are an English translation by the poet Charles Anthony Silvestri.
- The Norwegian progressive rock band Neograss set it to music in 2015 for their 5th studio album, Draumkvedet.

== Other adaptations ==
In the early 1920s, the Norwegian weaver Ragna Breivik produced a tapestry of Draumkvedet based on a drawing by Gerhard Munthe. The tapestry was acquired by Fana Municipality and now hangs in Fana Church.

== Recordings ==
Nordheim, Arne. Draumkvedet = The Dream Ballad. Vocal soloists and musicians; Grex Vocalis; Norwegian Radio Orchestra; Ingar Bergby, conductor. Simax PSC 1169, 2006. CD

== See also ==
- Visio Tnugdali
