= Ragna Breivik =

Norwegian textile artist

- Born: 9 September 1891; Rød i Fana, Fana Municipality, Norway
- Died: 10 March 1965 (aged 73); Rød i Fana, Fana Municipality, Norway
- Occupations: Tapestry designer and weaver
- Years active: 1913–1964
- Notable work: Åsmund Frægdagjeva tapestry series
- Parents: Lasse Breivik (father); Marta Knutsdotter (mother)

Ragna Breivik (9 September 1891 – 10 March 1965) was a Norwegian tapestry designer and weaver.

== Personal life ==
Breivik was born on 9 September 1891 to Marta Knutsdotter and Lasse Breivik at the farm of Rød in Fana Municipality, Hordaland county. The area is now part of Bergen Municipality in Norway. She learned to weave from her mother at an early age and could card, spin, dye, and weave by the age of ten. In childhood she also developed a strong interest in Norse mythology and Norwegian history, which would lead to a longstanding association with the painter and illustrator Gerhard Munthe. Throughout her life she was acquainted with many other leading Norwegian artists, including the painter Nikolai Astrup, and the prominent Norwegian cultural historian Christian Koren Wiberg was a champion of her work.

In 1917 she moved to Oslo, and in January 1927 to America, returning to Norway in 1932 after the death of her mother the previous year. Her brother, Captain Nicolai Breivik, drowned when his ship Elfrida sank in a storm on 9 December 1959. This greatly affected Ragna, who created the tapestry Engelen satt krone på in his memory. She herself died at Rød on 10 March 1965 at the age of 73.

== Education ==
Breivik undertook a course in weaving at Bergen's Home Crafts Association in 1910, followed by a one-year course in weaving and vegetable dyeing at Bergen Women's Industrial School in 1910–11 under the tutelage of Hilda Kristensen. At her father's suggestion, she trained as a teacher at the Women's Industrial School (now part of Oslo Metropolitan University) in Oslo in 1914.

== Career ==
Breivik's first independent tapestry work was Dansk Folkevise (Danish Folksong) in 1913, based on a painting by the Danish fresco painter Joakim Skovgaard. She took a position as a teacher of needlework and weaving at Nordhordland County School from 1915 to 1916. Her work from this period until 1920 includes De fem gode og de fem dårlige Jomfruer (The Five Good and the Five Bad Virgins) after a drawing by the artist Sigurd Lunde; Lunde later became a great help to her by adapting Gerhard Munthe's watercolours for weaving. She also wove two tapestries based on cartoons by the painter Axel Revold, Bjergprekenen (The Sermon on the Mount) and Jesus i Getsemane (Jesus in Gethsemane), as well as one based on Paa Havets Bund (At the Bottom of the Sea) after a design by the painter Arne Lofthus.

1920 saw the first of Breivik's many tapestries based on the designs of Gerhard Munthe, Trollebotn. It was followed in the early 1920s by another, Draumkvædet (Dream Ballad), woven for Fana Municipality and considered one of her major works. In 1921 she became a teacher of tapestry, dyeing, and spinning at Bergen School of Arts and Crafts, where she stayed until 1936. Her work was included in a group exhibition at the Bergen Art Association in 1926.

Her most renowned work is the Åsmund Frægdegjæva tapestries, a series of ten tapestries which she produced from 1923 to 1949 at her home in Rød i Fana from drawings by Munthe. The tapestries are now housed at the Bryggens Museum in Bergen, forming the centrepiece of a dedicated exhibition "Tales in Thread" of Breivik's life and work in 2025. The series illustrates the events of the medieval Norwegian ballad Åsmund Frægdegjevar.

From 1927 to 1932 she was an artist-in-residence at Edgewater Tapestry Looms in New Jersey, USA, with a solo exhibition at the Architectural League of New York running throughout her residency. At Edgewater she was in charge of all the wool dyeing for the studio, allowing her free rein to use her flair and sense of colour; in one single-panel tapestry she noted down 6,112 different shades, all from natural plant dyes, including over 40 used to depict the skin of a single face in the design. While in America she also exhibited at the Metropolitan Museum of Art, Brooklyn Museum, and the Toledo Museum of Art in Ohio, receiving critical praise in both the American and Norwegian press, including from prominent figures such as Allen H. Eaton and Knut Gjerset.

Breivik continued to produce tapestries based on Munthe's works after the completion of the Åsmund Frægdegjæva series. In 1949 she finished Døren i fjeldet (The Door in the Mountain), exhibiting with other artists in Munthe's house the same year. In 1951 she headed the tapestry course at the Bergen School of Arts and Crafts, and received a three-year work grant from the Norwegian state from 1951 to 1954. She also taught the textile course at the same institution from 1962 to 1963. In the period 1953–62 she wove eight tapestries from her own drawings with biblical motifs, and produced two more works from Munthe's drawings in the early 1960s: Engelen satt krone på (The Angel Set the Crown) in memory of her brother Nicolai and based on a vignette in Minder og meninger (Memories and Opinions) in 1960, and Beileren (The Suitor) in 1962. She finished her final tapestry, again from a Munthe design, in February 1964.

== Weaving technique ==
Breivik blended dyed fleece before spinning the wool for her tapestries, instead of dyeing already spun yarn, resulting in multicoloured thread. She believed this gave vivacity to the finished work even if it diluted the clarity of the colours. She used the winding technique in all her tapestries, considering it necessary to realise the motifs. This winding technique is better suited to curved and rounded shapes in ornamentation than the slaking technique used in older Norwegian weaving, which produces harder, more angular lines. Breivik believed the winding technique allowed her to give more life to larger areas in the finished work.
