= Ragnar Søderlind =

Norwegian composer (born 1945)

Ragnar Søderlind (born 27 June 1945) is a Norwegian composer. He has written ballets and operas, and for the concert hall, programmatic works based on poems.

== Biography ==
Ragnar studied with Conrad Baden in Oslo and with Erik Bergman and Joonas Kokkonen at the Sibelius Academy in Helsinki. This was followed by studies in conducting at the Norwegian State Academy of Music where he is currently a faculty member.

As a composer, Søderlind initially composed orchestral works which were strongly influenced by late Romanticism and early 20th-century European music. His style has become more advanced over the years, yet throughout he has been a master of orchestration and has maintained his personal stamp on sound. In addition to orchestral music, his output includes incidental music for plays, ballets and operas. He has also arranged a considerable amount of music, including several works by Edvard Grieg, and he has recently written an opera that includes Grieg’s music for Olav Tryggvason.

== Discography ==
- Søderlind's Violin Concerto has been recorded together with Johan Kvandal's on the Centaur label.
- Symphonies Nos. 2 & 3, "Rokkomborre", London Symphony Orchestra, Ragnar Söderlind conductor, Aurora label (1989).

== Works ==
- 1962/63:“Jolsterslatt” for orchestra, op.2: 3 minutes
- 1964-65:“Preludium” for orchestra, op.4: 9 minutes
- 1965/77:“Pieta” for male voice and string orchestra, op.5: 6 minutes
- 1967: “Fra Nord til Sor” for symphonic band, op.7B: 3 minutes
- “Rokkomborre” for orchestra, op.8: 7 minutes + (Aurora cd)
- 1967-70:Symphonic Vision “Polaris” for orchestra, op.11: 14 minutes + (Aurora cd)
- 1968: Trauermusik for orchestra, op.12: 9 minutes + (Aurora cd)
- 1969: “Fantasia Borealis” for orchestra, op.14: 11 minutes
- 1971: Sinfonia minimale for youth orchestra, op.16: 4 minutes
- 1971-72:International Rhapsody for orchestra or small orchestra, op.17: 10 minutes
- 1973/75:“Two Pieces from the Desert” for Oboe and Small Orchestra, op. 21B: 11 minutes
- 1974: “Fra myggenes land” for symphonic band, op.18
- 1975/79:Symphony No.1, op.23: 27 minutes
- 1977/80:Cantata “Vaer utamodig, menneske” for chorus and orchestra, op. 25: 10 minutes
- 1978: Symphonic/Choreographic Drama “Hedda Gabler” for orchestra, op.26: 30 minutes
- “Dagsalme” for symphonic band and organ, op.28, No.2
- 1979: Symphonic Poem “Amor et labor”, op. 27: 10 minutes
- 1981: Symphony No.2 “Sinfonia Breve”, op.30: 14 minutes + (Aurora cd)
- 1981/88:Sinfonietta for brass and percussion, op. 31 A: 15 minutes
- 1982: Ballet “Kristin Lavransdatter”, op.32: 45 minutes
- Symphonic Poem “Kom havsindar, kom!, op.33: 5 minutes
- 1982-83:“Eg hev funne min floysne lokkar att I mitt svarmerus” for soprano and orchestra, op.35C: 10 minutes
- 1982-95:Symphonic Poem “Krans og kors”, op.64: 45 minutes
- 1983: Olavs Hymne” for male voice, chorus and orchestra, op. 36: 13 minutes
- “Septemberlys” for male voice and orchestra, op.37: 15 minutes
- Two Songs for male voice and orchestra, op.39B: 5 minutes
- 1984: Symphony No.3 “Les illuminations symphoniques” for soprano, baritone and orchestra, op.40: 35 minutes + (Aurora cd)
- “Toccata brillante over ‘Seier’n er var’ for orchestra, op.41: 4 minutes
- “Nasadiya/Upphavshymna”, op.42 for chorus and ensemble: 10 minutes
- Nostalgic Rhapsody “Eystradalir” for orchestra, op. 43: 12 minutes
- 1985: Symphonic Poem “Av hav er du komen” for four narrators, violin, women’s chorus and orchestra, op.44: 45 minutes
- 1985-86:Ballet Music “Victoria”, op. 45 (and Ballet Suite, op.45B: 15 minutes)
- 1986-87: Violin Concerto, op. 46: 34 minutes + (Centaur cd)
- 1988: Ecstasy for strings and timpani, op.45C: 6 minutes
- 1989: Passion Cantata for two voices, chorus and orchestra, op. 48
- 1990: Tone Poem “The Hour of Love”, op.45D
- 1990/95:Symphony No.4 “Sedimenti musicalii”, op.50: 30 minutes + (Aurora cd)
- 1991: “Transtromer”: Suite for voice, piano, two percussion and string orchestra or chamber orchestra, op.52 B and C: 25 minutes
- 1991-92:Cello Concerto, op.54: 36 minutes + (Aurora cd)
- 1992: Two Songs from texts by Hans Borli for low voice and orchestra, op. 55B: 5 minutes
- “Haugebonden”-Ten Ironic Variations on a Norwegian folk-tune for chamber orchestra, op.56: 10 minutes
- 1993/97:Symphonic Poem “Der Tanz des Lebens” for tenor and orchestra, op.67: 25 minutes
- 1994/95:Cantata “Bak morke vinter ventar ein var” for six solo voices, chorus and orchestra, op. 61: 25 minutes
- “De beste” for voice and small orchestra, op.62C: 2 minutes
- 1995: Fanfare Regale for orchestra, op.63: 1 minute
- 1995/2001:Symphony No.5 “Kvitsunn”, op.60: 28 minutes *
- Symphonic Suite “Angst”, op.68: 20 minutes
- 1996-97:Piano Concerto “Colosso”, op.70: 38 minutes
- 1997: Cantata “Rogden Sjo” for soprano, chorus and orchestra, op.72A
- 1998-99: Symphony No.6 “Todesahnung”, op.74: 45 minutes
- 1999: “Arle I old: Tanker ved et tidsskille” for lur, ram’s horn and orchestra, op.75: 7 minutes
- “The Hollow Men: A Penny for the Old Guy” (A Little Requiem for the 20th century) for male chorus and chamber orchestra, op.76:12 minutes
- 2001-02:Trumpet Concerto “Die Signale des Tods und des Lebens”, op. 80: 28 minutes
- 2001: “Rapsodia del teatro” for mezzo-soprano, cello and string orchestra, op. 82: 12 minutes
- 2002: Symphony No.7 “La Campane dell’Atlantico” for baritone, chorus and orchestra, op.85 B: 33 minutes
- 2002-03:Viola Concerto “Nostalgia delle radici”, op. 86: 40 minutes
- 2003: “Mother Bear” for chorus, harp, piano, timpani, two percussion and string orchestra, op. 87B
- 2004: “Sona-Torrek”-Melodrama for narrator men’s choir and orchestra, op.90
- 2004-05:Symphony No.8 “Jean Sibelius in memoriam”, op.95: 23 minutes
- 2005: Symphonic Incantations “The Great Mother Bear” for orchestra, op.92:20 minutes
- 2009: “A Nordic Requiem: a Mass for the Living and the Dead” for seven, soloists, chorus and orchestra, op.104: 120 minutes
- 2012: Symphony No. 9, "Il Grande Enigma", for Tenor, choir, and orchestra: 55 minutes
- 2013: The Waste Land - Dramatic cantata in 5 parts for Soprano, Mezzo-Soprano, Tenor and Bass baritone solo, chorus, and orchestra, op. 115 : 2 hours
- 2014: La Profezia della Veggante - Cantata drammatica in due atti, op. 117: 85 minutes
- 2017: Jötunheim – Eine kleine "Alpensinfonie" – For choir and orchestra, Op. 122 C: 23 minutes
- 2019: The Love Song of J. Alfred Prufrock: for Tenor and Orchestra, op. 127: 28 minutes
- 2020: Symphony No. 10, "Corona" for orchestra, op. 130: 28 minutes
- 2021: Symphony No. 11, "Corona part 2" for orchestra, op. 132: 46 minutes
- 2023: Symphony No. 12, Lyric Symphony for Soprano, Baritone, and Orchestra "Le Voyage", op. 138: 45 minutes

== Sources ==
- Arvid O. Vollsnes. The New Grove Dictionary of Opera, edited by Stanley Sadie (1992), ISBN 0-333-73432-7 and ISBN 1-56159-228-5
- Colin Mackie's Website: Composer Catalogues
- Norwegian Contemporary Music, publisher (nb.no)
