= The Wild Choir =

Poetry collection by Knut Hamsun

The Wild Choir (Norwegian: Det vilde Kor) is a poetry collection by Nobel laureate in literature Knut Hamsun. It was published in 1904 and is his only poetry collection. The collection contains existentialist, erotic and political poems. One of the best known poems from the collection is "Letter to Byron in the Great Beyond" (Himmelbrev til Byron), addressed to the late English poet Lord Byron, one of Hamsun's role models. It also includes the poem "In a hundred years, all is forgotten" (Om hundrede år er allting glemt). The collection has been set to music by different composers and musicians, including the album Bjørnstad/Paus/Hamsun (1982) by Ole Paus and Ketil Bjørnstad, the album Det Vilde Kor (2007) by Lumsk, and the operatic song cycle Det vilde Kor (2009) by Marcus Paus.

== Bibliography ==
- Knut Hamsun, Det vilde kor og andre dikt, Gyldendal Norsk Forlag, 1999
