= Eidsborg Stave Church =

Church in Telemark, Norway

- Eidsborg stavkyrkje
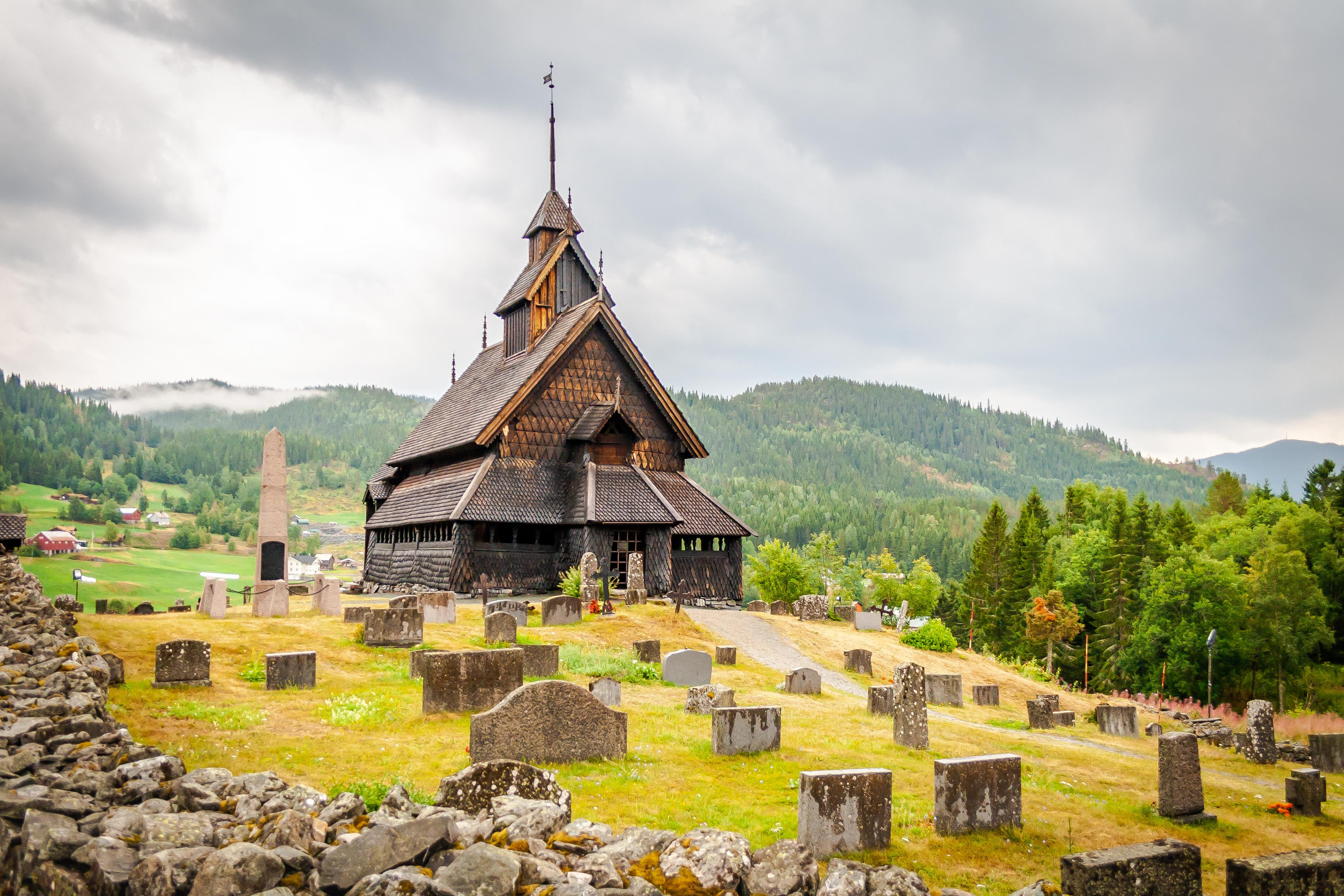
- View of the church
- Eidsborg Stave Church
- 59°27′52″N 8°01′19″E
- Location: Tokke Municipality, Telemark
- Country: Norway
- Denomination: Church of Norway
- Previous denomination: Catholic Church
- Churchmanship: Evangelical Lutheran

History
- Status: Parish church
- Founded: c. 1150

Architecture
- Functional status: Active
- Architectural type: Long church
- Completed: c. 1150 (876 years ago)

Specifications
- Capacity: 70
- Materials: Wood

Administration
- Diocese: Agder og Telemark
- Deanery: Øvre Telemark prosti
- Parish: Eidsborg, Mo, og Skafså
- Norwegian Cultural Heritage Site
- Type: Church
- Status: Automatically protected
- ID: 84071

Eidsborg Stave Church (Norwegian: Eidsborg stavkyrkje) is a parish church of the Church of Norway in Tokke Municipality in Telemark county, Norway. It is located in the village of Eidsborg. It is one of the churches for the Eidsborg, Mo, og Skafså parish which is part of the Øvre Telemark prosti (deanery) in the Diocese of Agder og Telemark. The brown, wooden stave church was built in a long church design, using plans drawn up by an unknown architect. The church seats about 70 people. It was long beleved that the church was built around the year 1250, but newer research and analysis have challenged that belief and discovered that it was actually built around 100 years earlier, around 1150

Eidsborg Stave Church is one of the best preserved Norwegian stave churches. The church is located next to the Vest-Telemark Museum in Eidsborg. The church is still in use as a parish church, but it is a popular tourist site as well.

== History ==
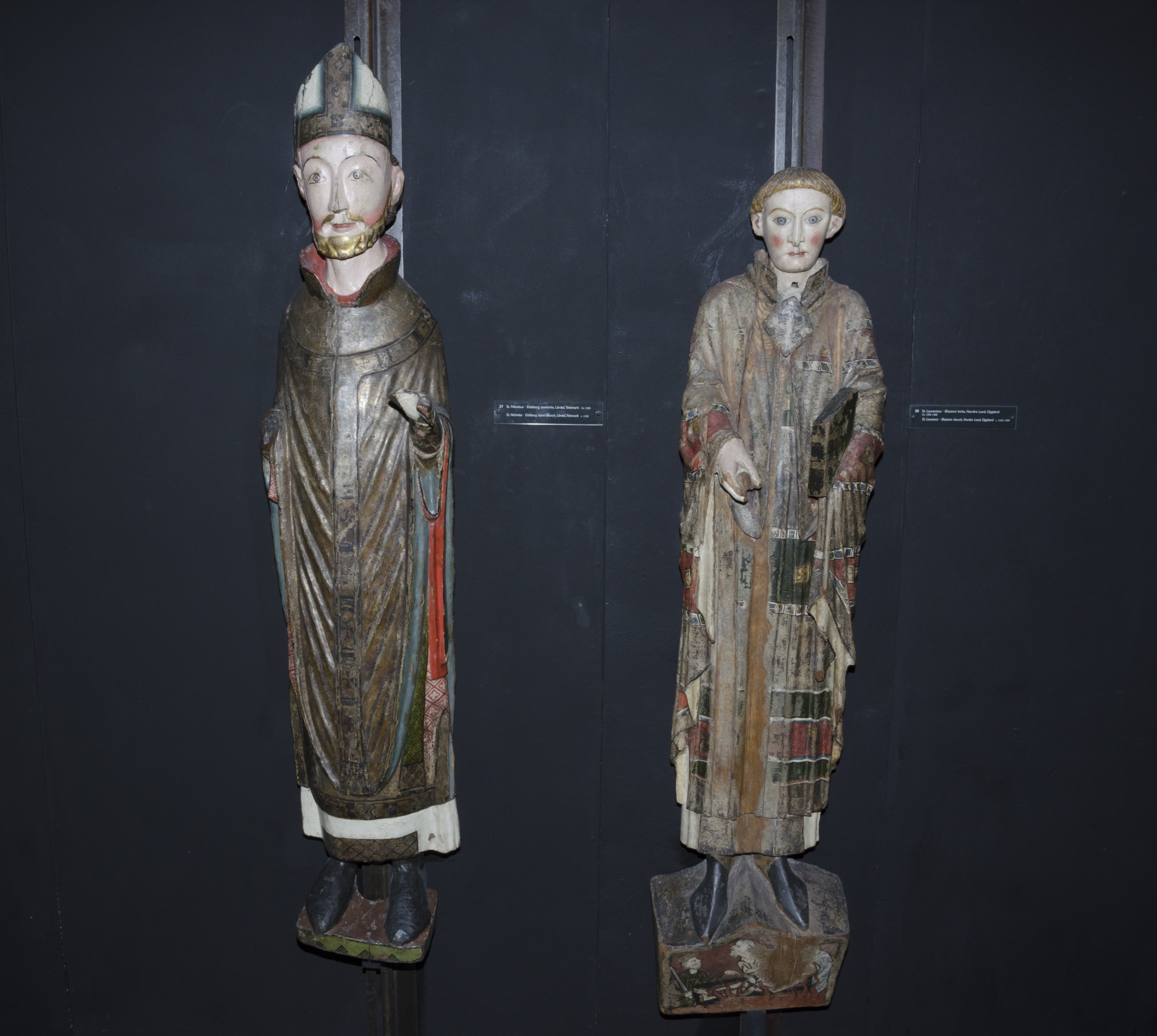
13th century statue of St. Nicholas of Bari

The earliest existing historical records of the church date back to the year 1354, but the wooden church is estimated to have been built before that, between 1145 and 1155. The church has been remodeled a number of times over the years. To begin with, it was a relatively simple long church with a narrower choir. Charred remains of wood under the existing church indicate that there was a building on the site earlier, but nothing is known about that. In the 1600s, the inner walls of the church were decorated with murals. In the 1700s, a tower was built on top of the roof over the nave. In 1826, the old choir was torn down and the church was extended to the east with a new choir that was the same width as the nave. In 1845, a new timber-framed choir was built to the east of the newly extended church and the choir area from 1826 was incorporated into the nave. At the same time, the church was paneled on the inside and got new interior furniture. In the 1920s, there was a restoration where the interior paneling and the relatively new false ceiling were removed. Also, the 17th century wall murals were uncovered and restored in colour and some of the ornaments from the Renaissance were uncovered. In the 2000s, the roof structure was repaired.

=== Dedication ===
The church is dedicated to the traveler's patron, St. Nicholas of Bari. In the church there was a painted sculpture of St. Nicholas from the middle of the 12th century. According to a legend, every midsummer night she was carried to a nearby pond and immersed there. Today this sculpture is in the collection of the Kulturhistorisk Museum in Oslo. A copy of the sculpture is on display in the stave church.

== Construction ==
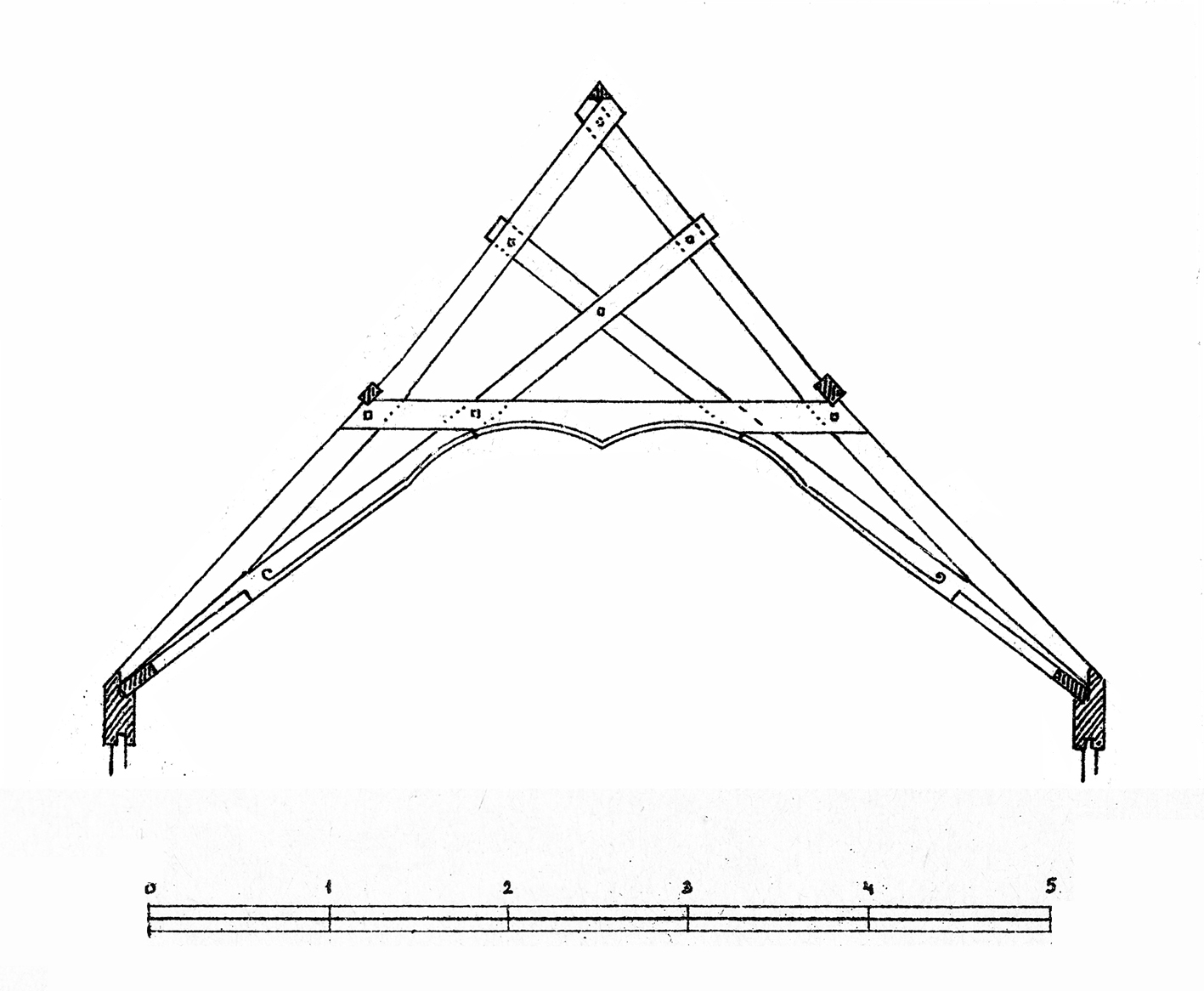
Roof truss of Eidsborg stave church.

The church is a single-nave, rectangular long church. The roof structure is supported by four corner pillars and has no additional supports in the interior. The wall panels are clamped between the corner pillars and supported by additional posts. Around the church there is an arc with small arcs to the north, south, and west. The main entrance is on the west. In 1928, the remains of a decorated archivolt were discovered above the entrance, between the pillars. The outer layer of the building forms a wooden shingle façade that clad the walls as well as the roof and the corner pillars. The church construction is (for the most part) like other well-known stave churches of this size, but the solutions and work stand out in a somewhat shallow design. There is also very little decoration in the form of elaborate details and sheds on the oldest parts of the church.

When the church was first built, it was a simple small single-nave long church in stave-work, measuring less than 40 square metres (430 sq ft). This was probably a common size of village stave churches in Norway during the Middle Ages. The nave measured 6.3 by 5.3 metres (21 ft × 17 ft) and the choir was 2.2 metres (7 ft 3 in) wide. The first choir was demolished in the 17th century, but there is a sign of it in the building. The roof of the choir was somewhat lower than that of the church. The choir probably had no more than 6 square metres (65 sq ft) of floor space. The church did not initially have open-air corridors surrounding it, but it did have a tower on the roof in the middle of the building the start.

Simple stave churches like this one have a construction where bottom sleepers lie on a stone wall and are tied together in the corner by standing corner staves. At the upper end of the corner rods, the rod leg is tapped in. Between the bottom villa and the stave floor are the wall planks that are fastened in quadrants with tongue and groove. The upper corners are reinforced with knees made of angular wax, often taken from the transition between trunk and root. The roof construction is made up of reinforced rafters, cock beams and knees, fastened to the pole. This is how the Eidsborg church is built, but unlike other stave churches, the bottom villas in the Eidsborg church are not lathed over one another in the corner, but only seen next to each other and held together by the corner staff. This is a less stable construction than usual, something that may indicate that less experienced stave church builders were on the work team who set up the oldest part of the church. On the bottom villas, there is a clear ax mark after counting, both on the outside and inside. This is also an unusual feature because in other stave churches, all such marks are plastered away so that the walls are smooth, especially on the inside.

There were two entrances to the church, one in the choir and one in the nave, both on the south side of the church. In the bottom villa below the entrance to the church, a double-arch profile has been preserved. Probably there was one like this also on the upper side of the door, and correspondingly at the entrance to the choir. This is a Gothic decorative element that is not known from many churches, but they are dated to around 1250–1300. Double arches can also be found on some small windows on the roof tower. Two church bells from the Middle Ages hang inside the tower. The oldest of them is stylistically dated to 1250–1280, while the other is several decades younger.

The church was repeatedly changed through restorations. Nevertheless, the nave is considered to have been preserved in the original. In 1693, the roof turret was rebuilt, and in the 19th century the church was extended to the east. In the 1920s and 1930s, the false ceiling was removed and small windows were inserted. During the restoration, a fireplace was discovered under the floor. This served possibly for burnt offerings of pagan cults. The wood shingle facade dates from the 1970s and shows cracks. During the early 2000s, breakage was found on the main structure. Rafter girders were kinked and pushed down by the load. An additional supporting structure was then installed above the rafters and the wooden shingles were replaced.

== Media gallery ==
Old and modern photos

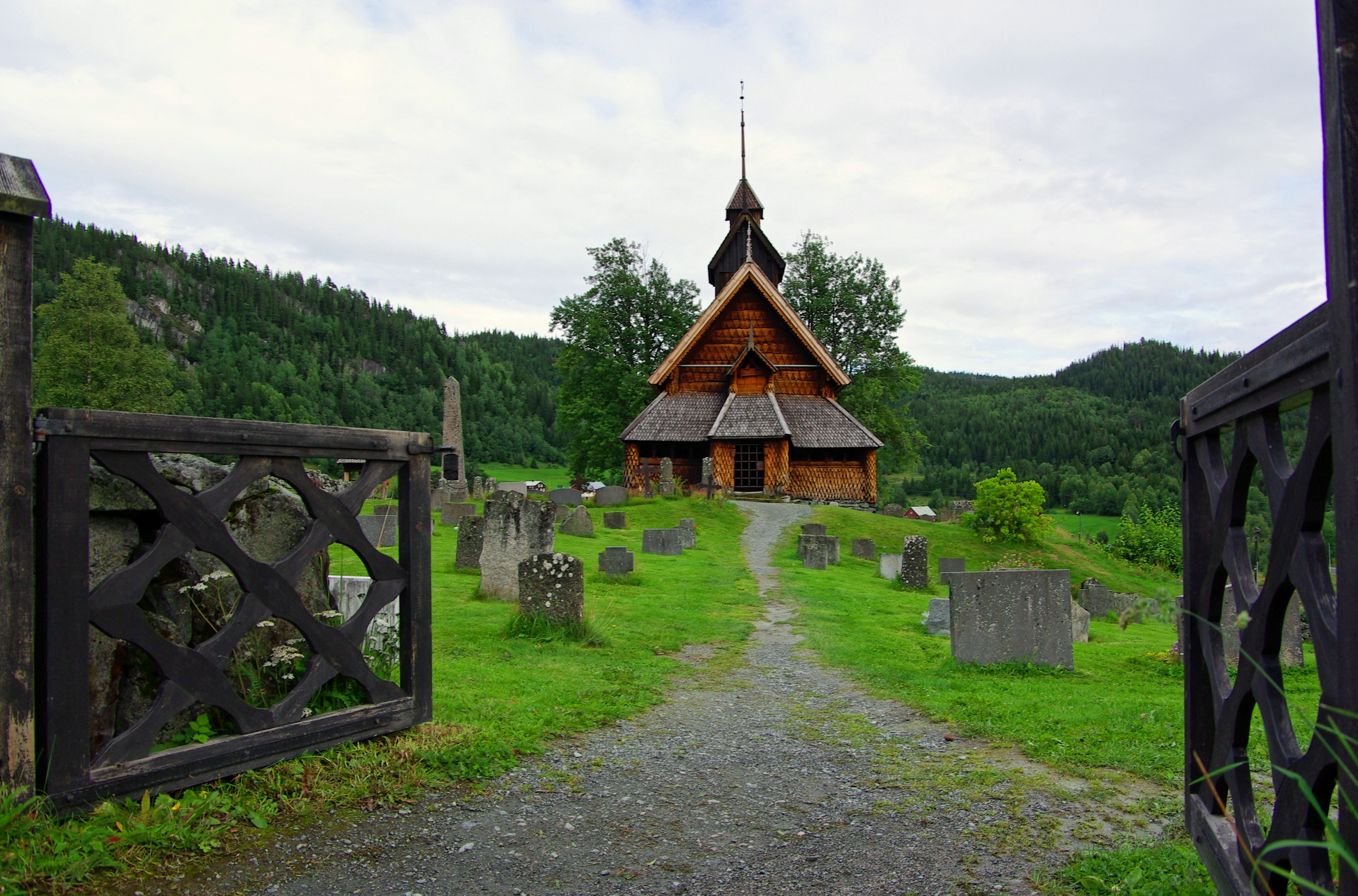

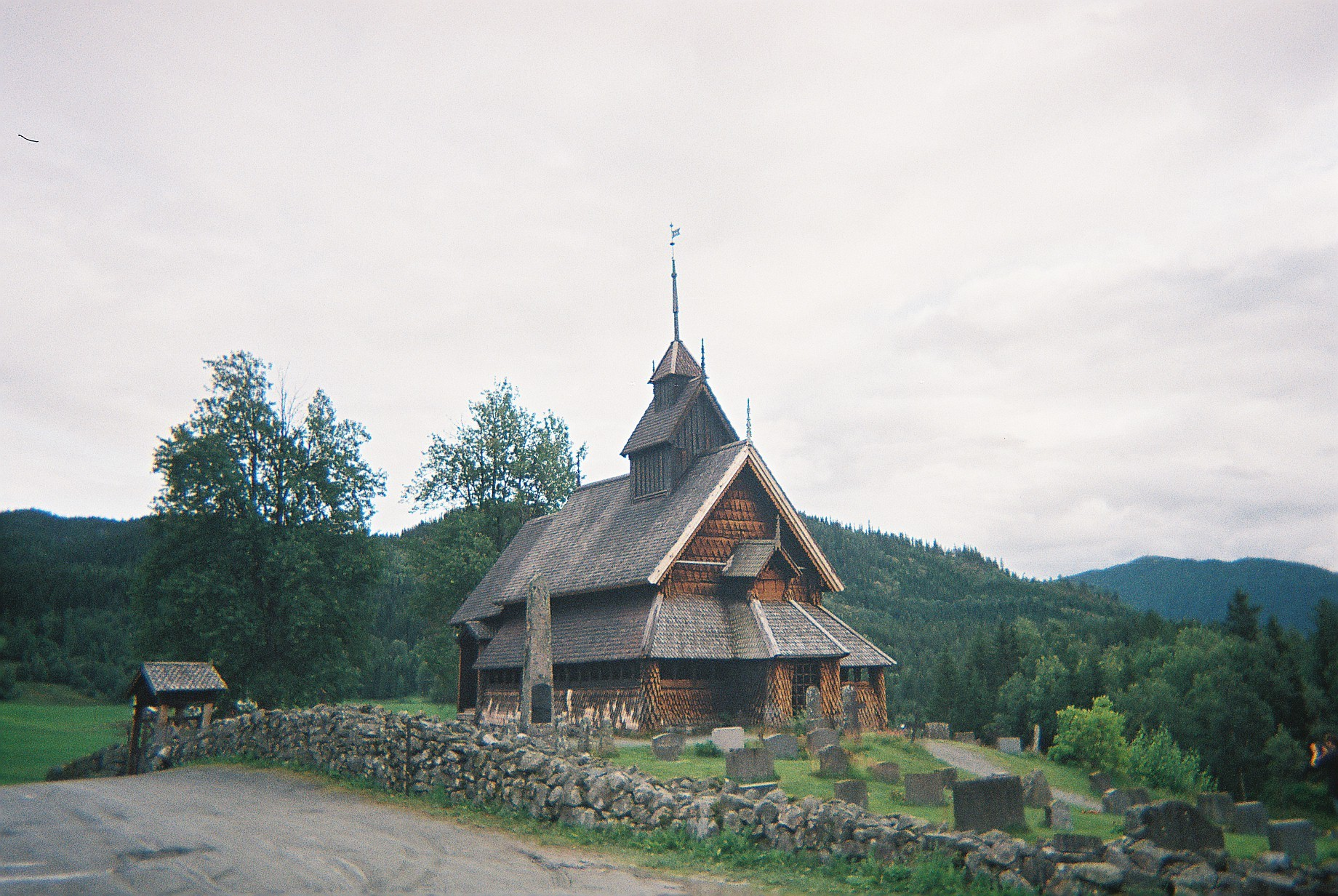

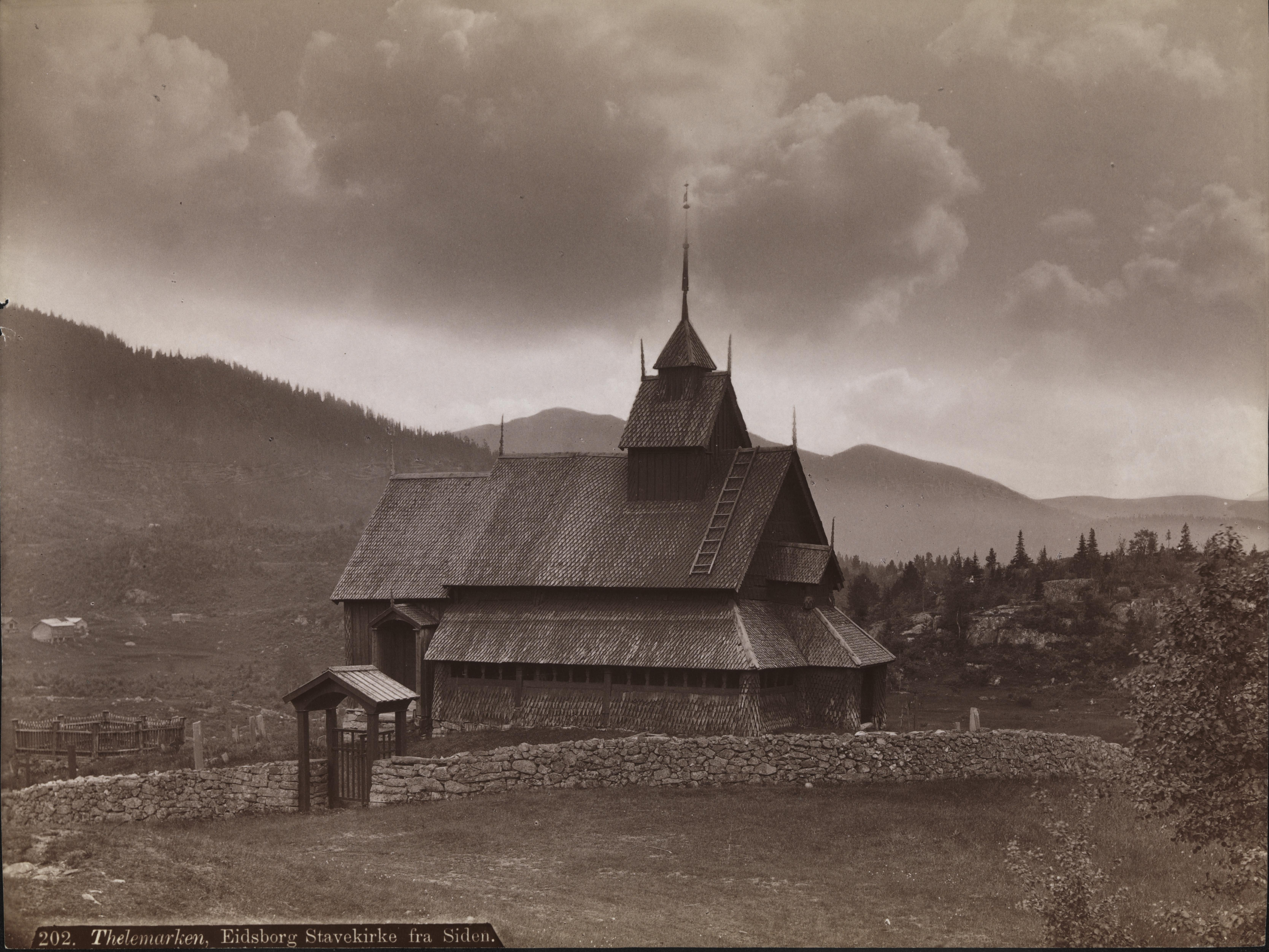
Photo from 1880 to 1890

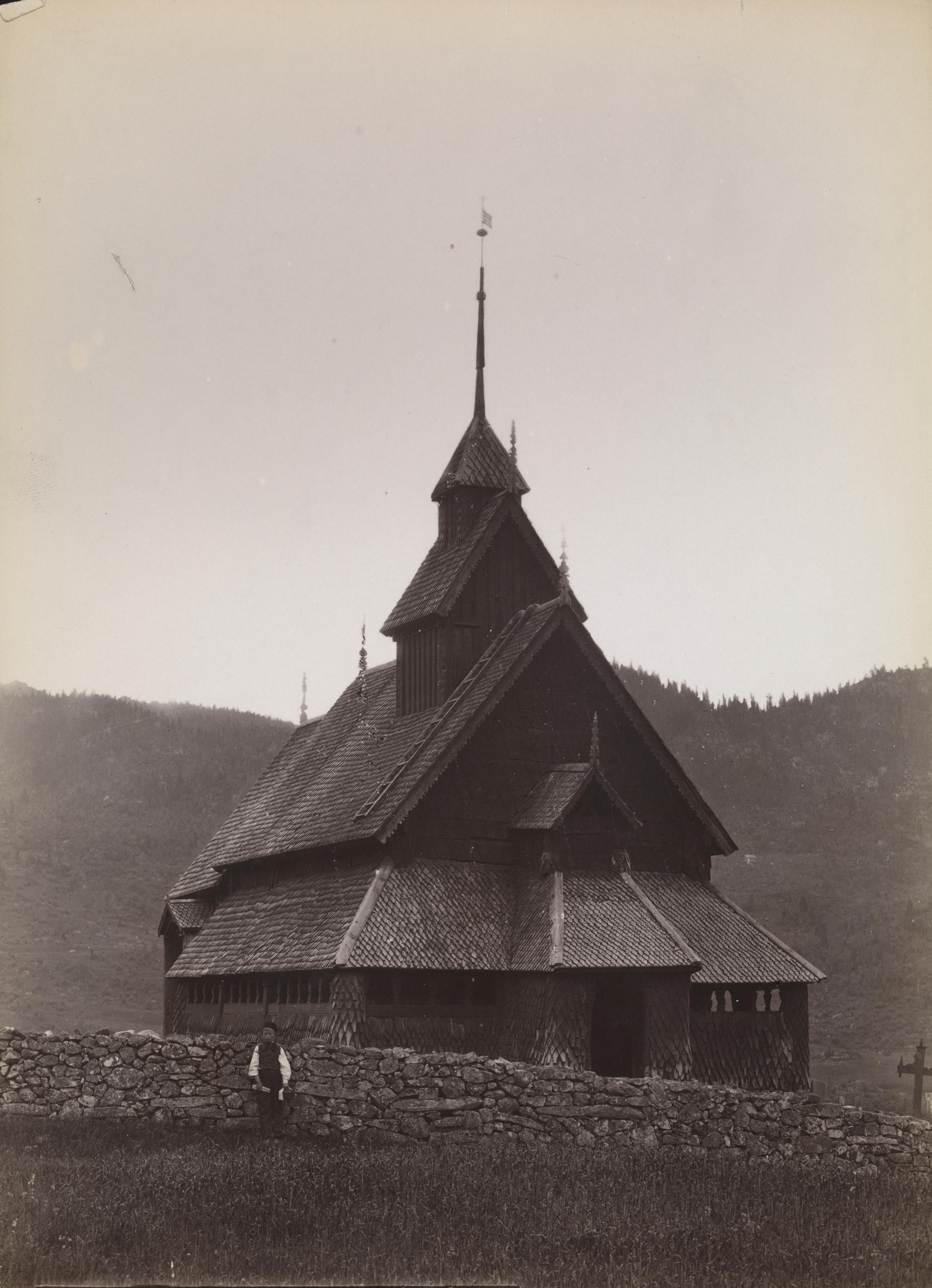
Photo from 1880 to 1890
Decorations of the Eidsborg Stave Church

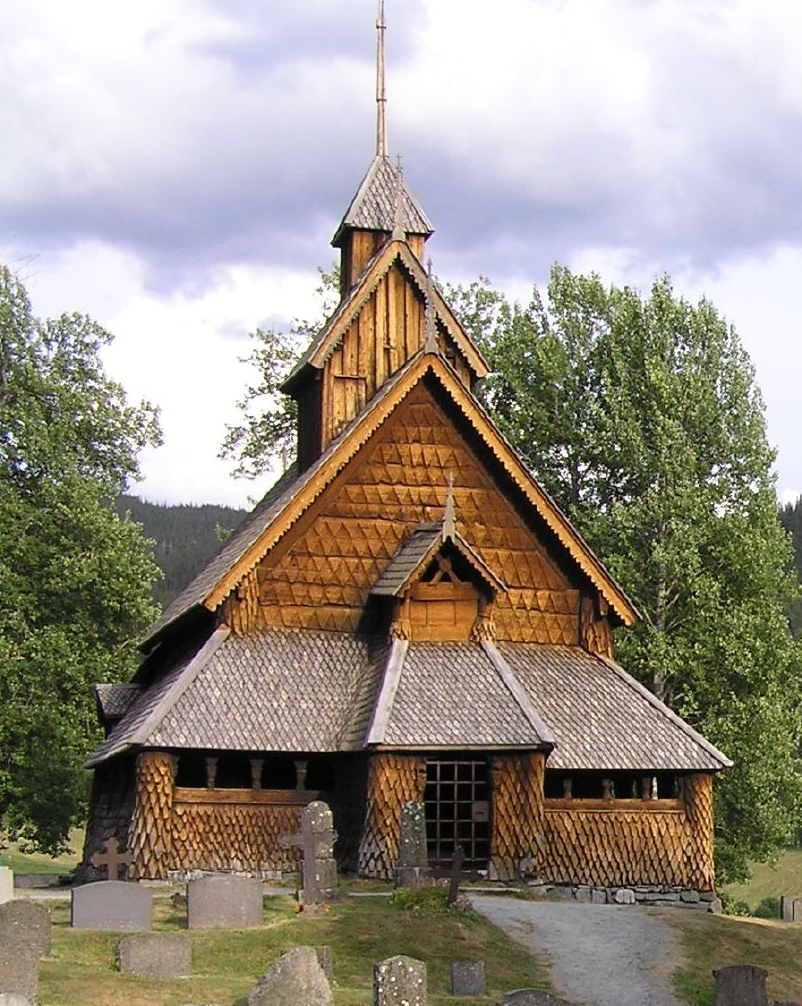
West view

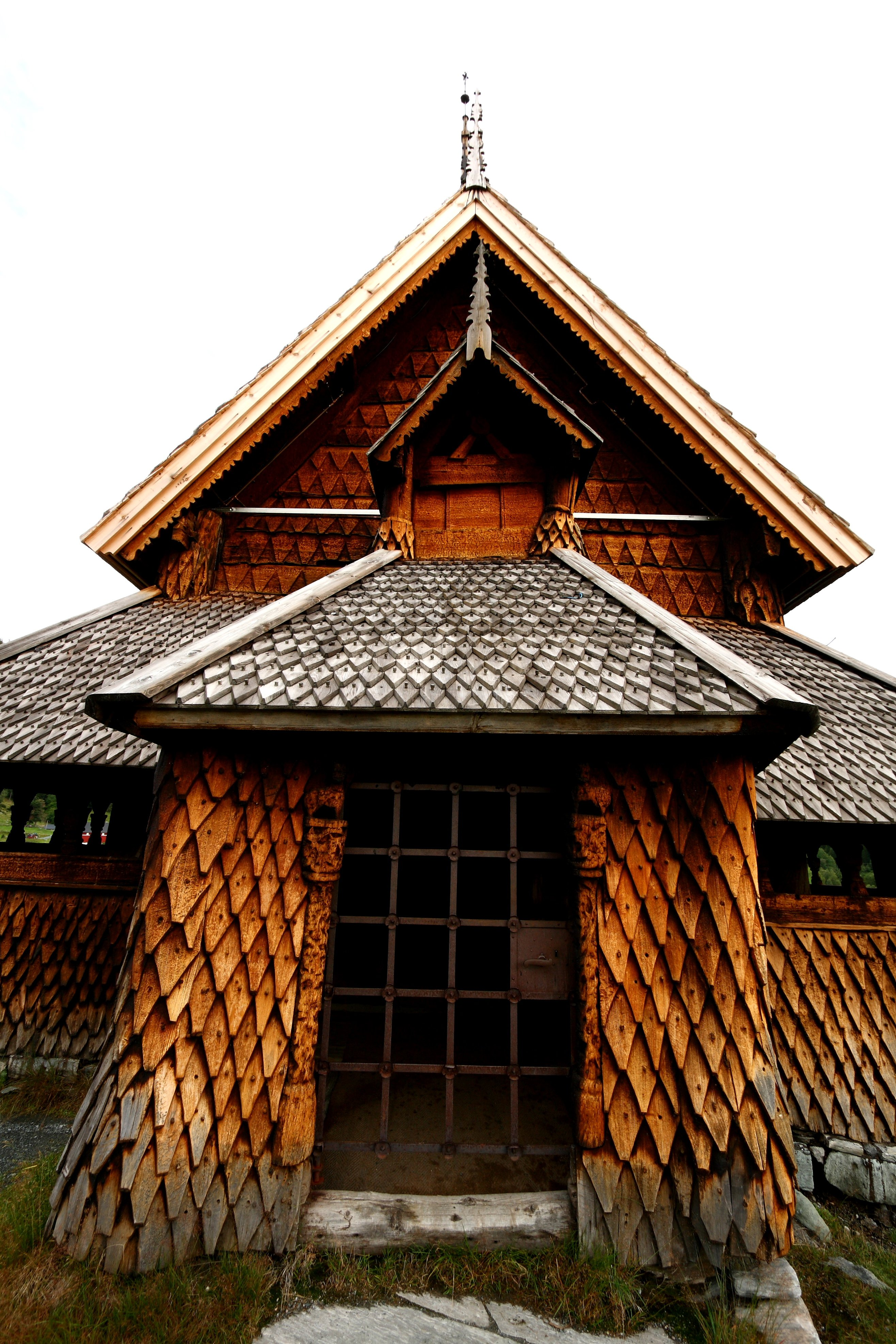
West portal, 2008

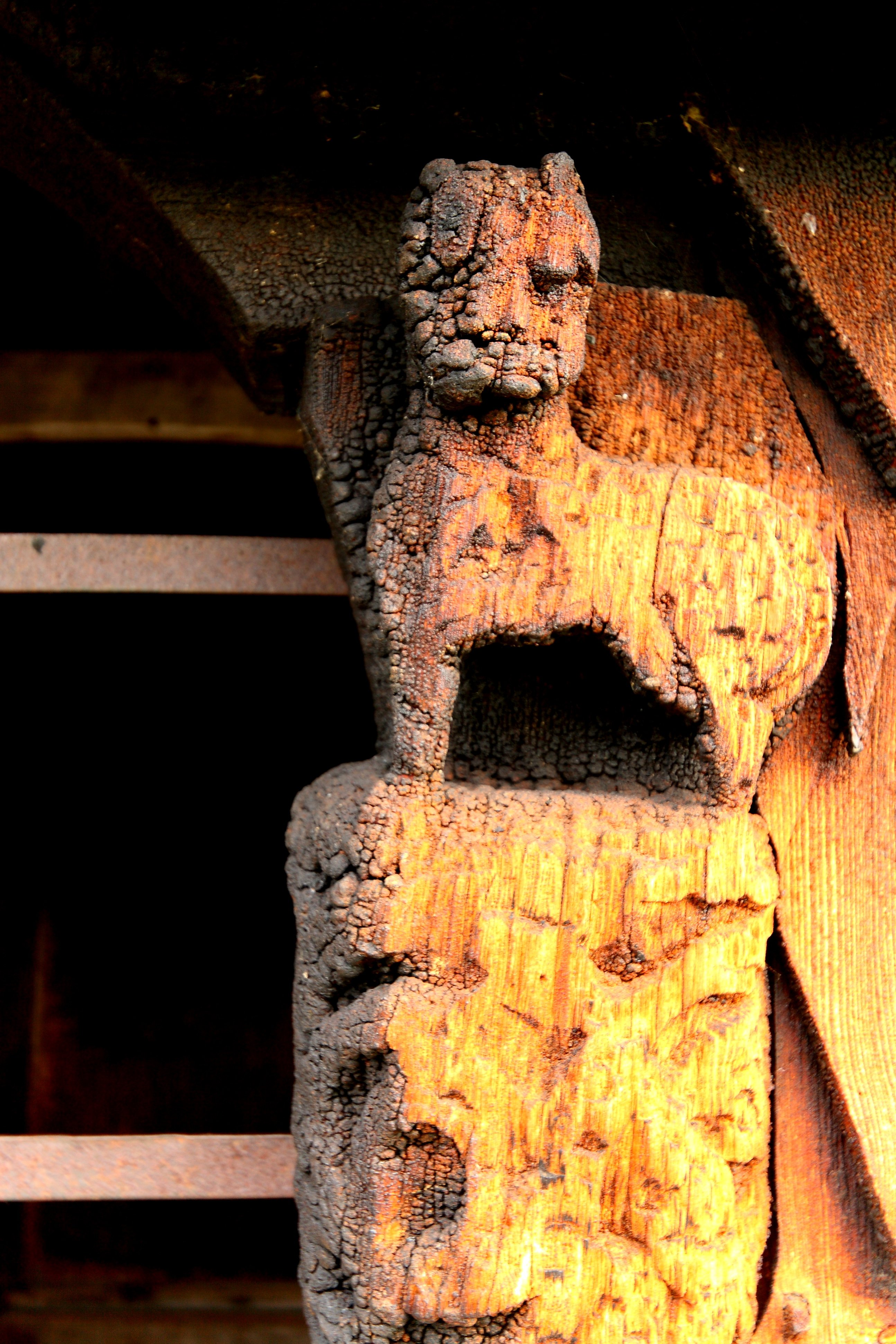
Detail of the portal

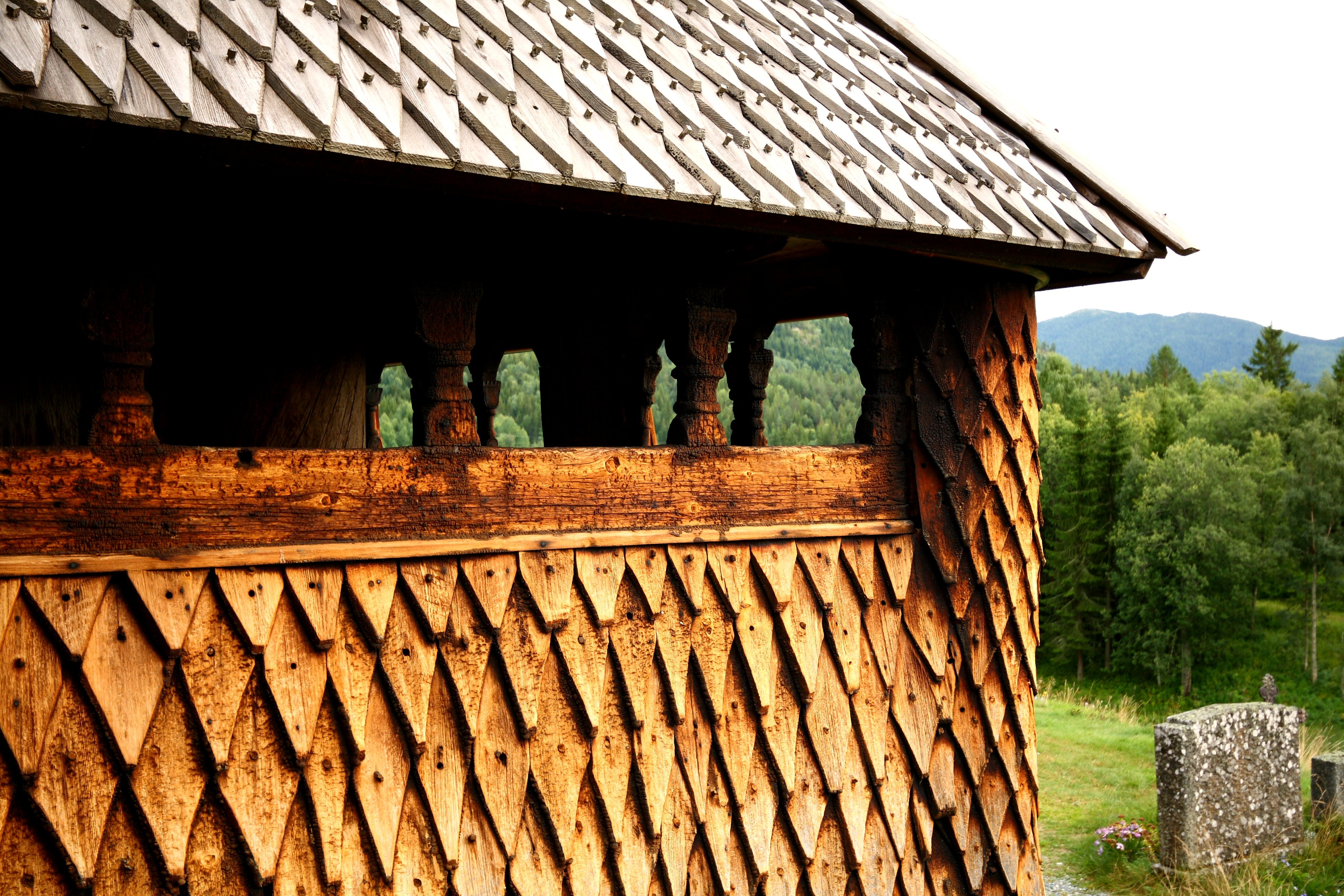
Detailed view of the wooden shingle facade

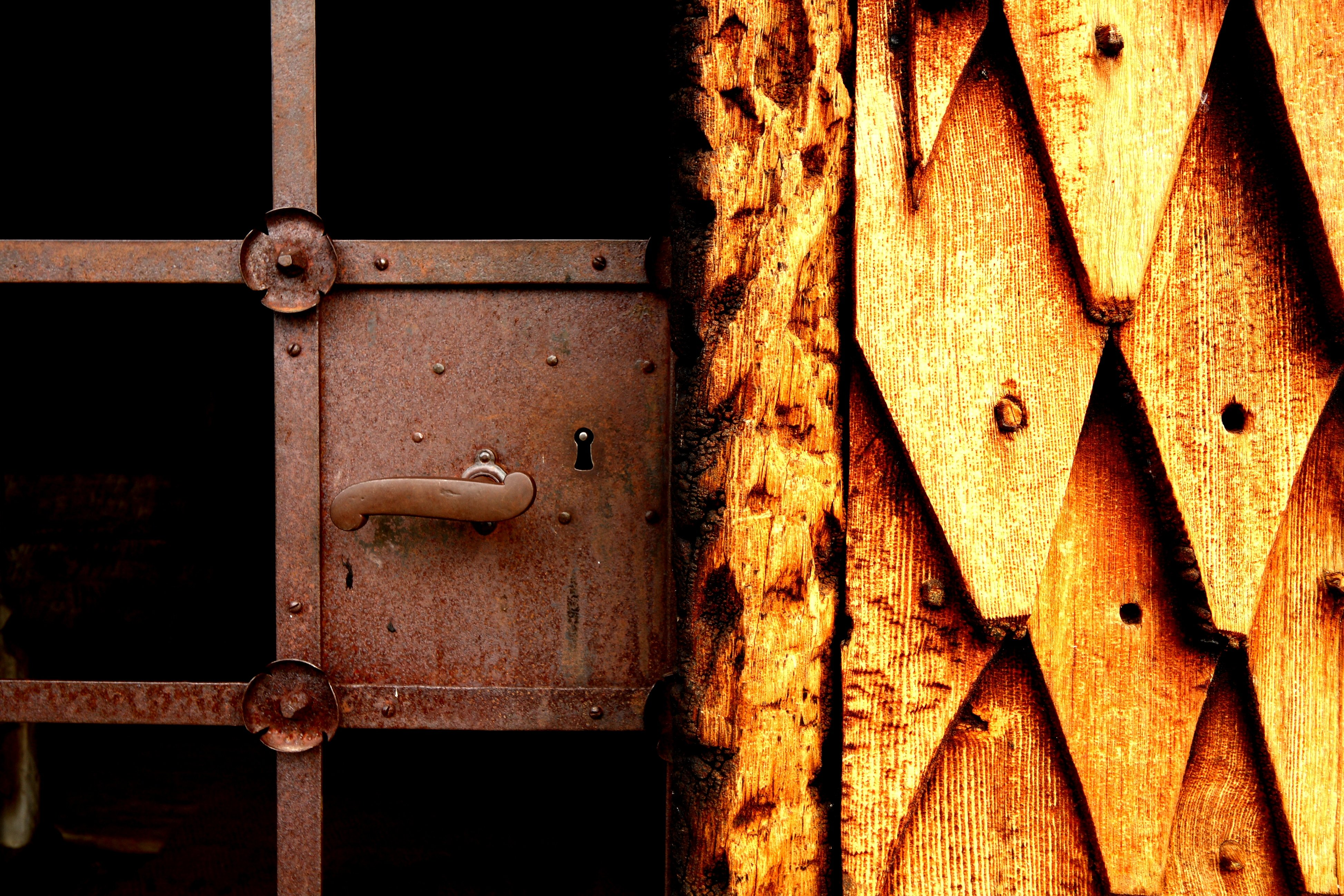
Detail of Eidsborg stave church
Historical illustrations

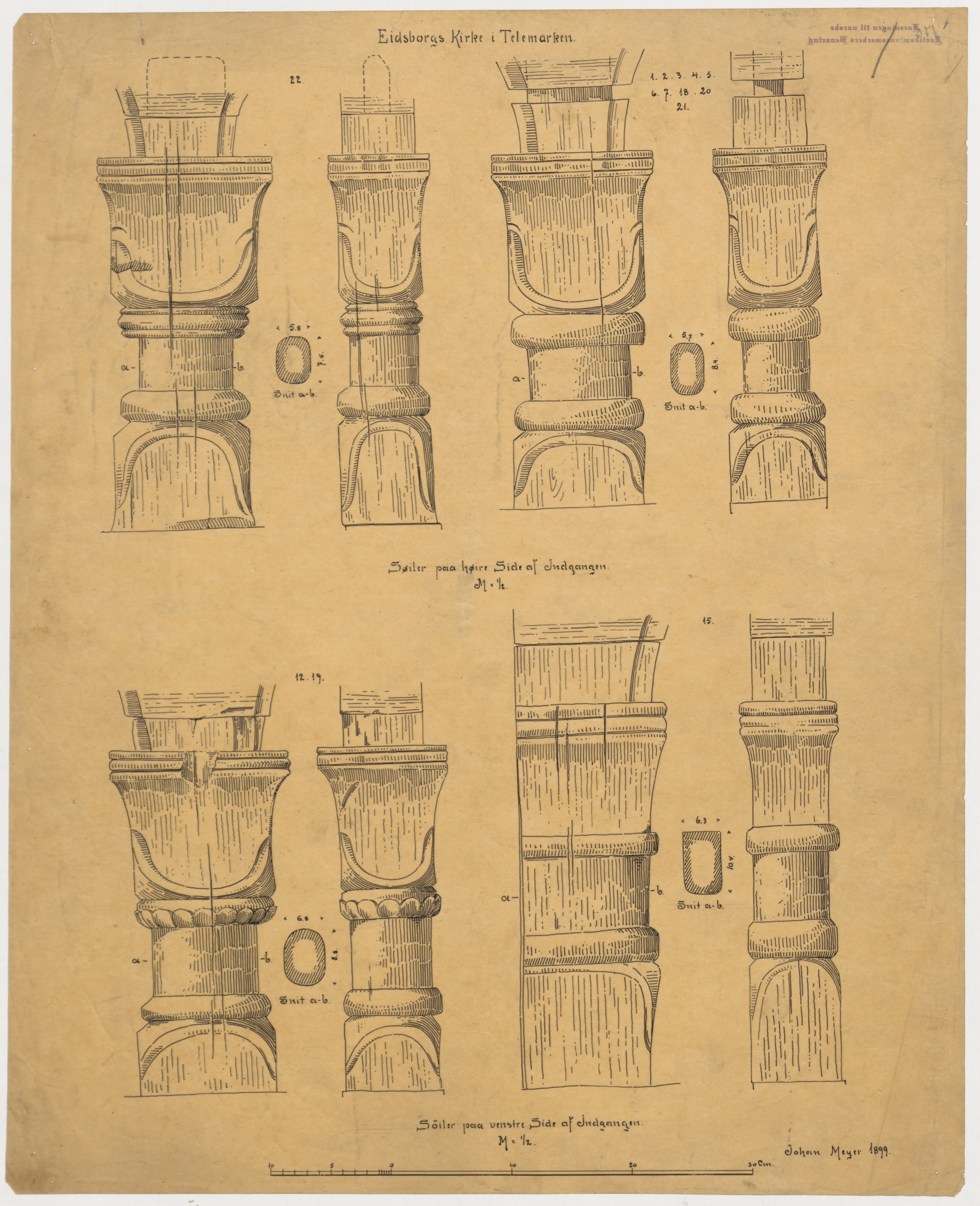
Elevation and side view of 4 columns from the hallway.

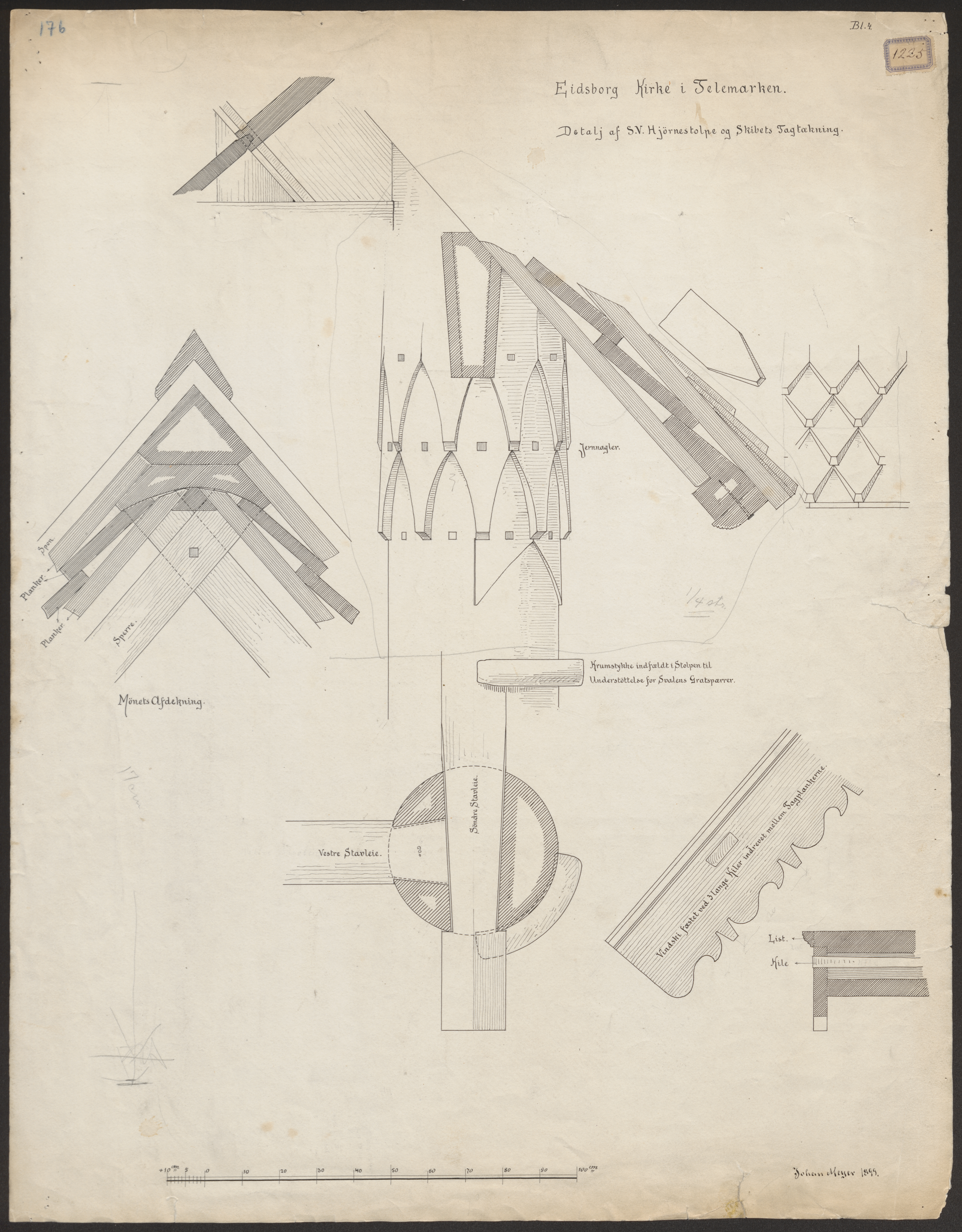
Detail of corner post and the roofing.

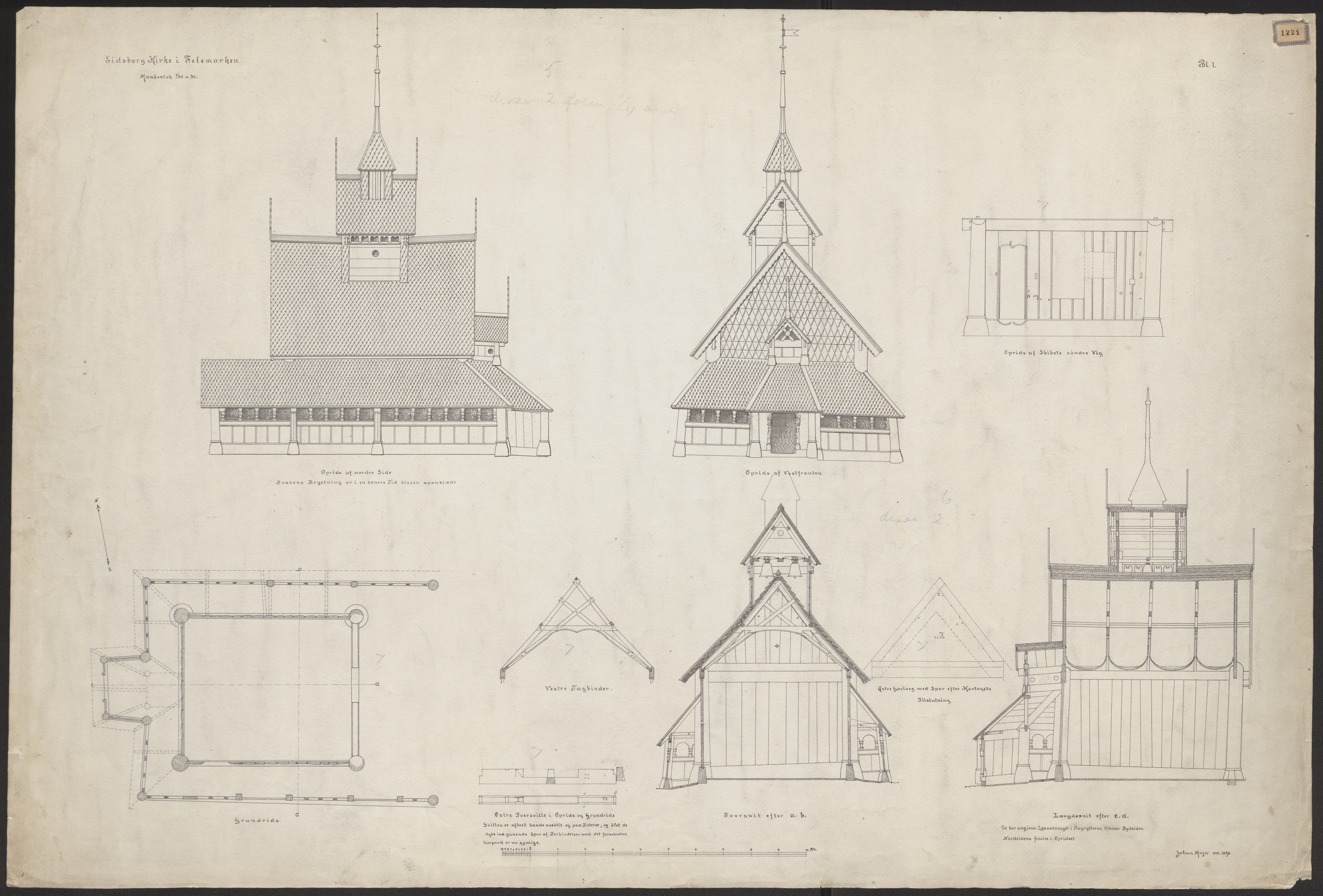
Ground plan, longitudinal section, cross section, elevation of the west façade and north façade, elevation of the south wall of the church.

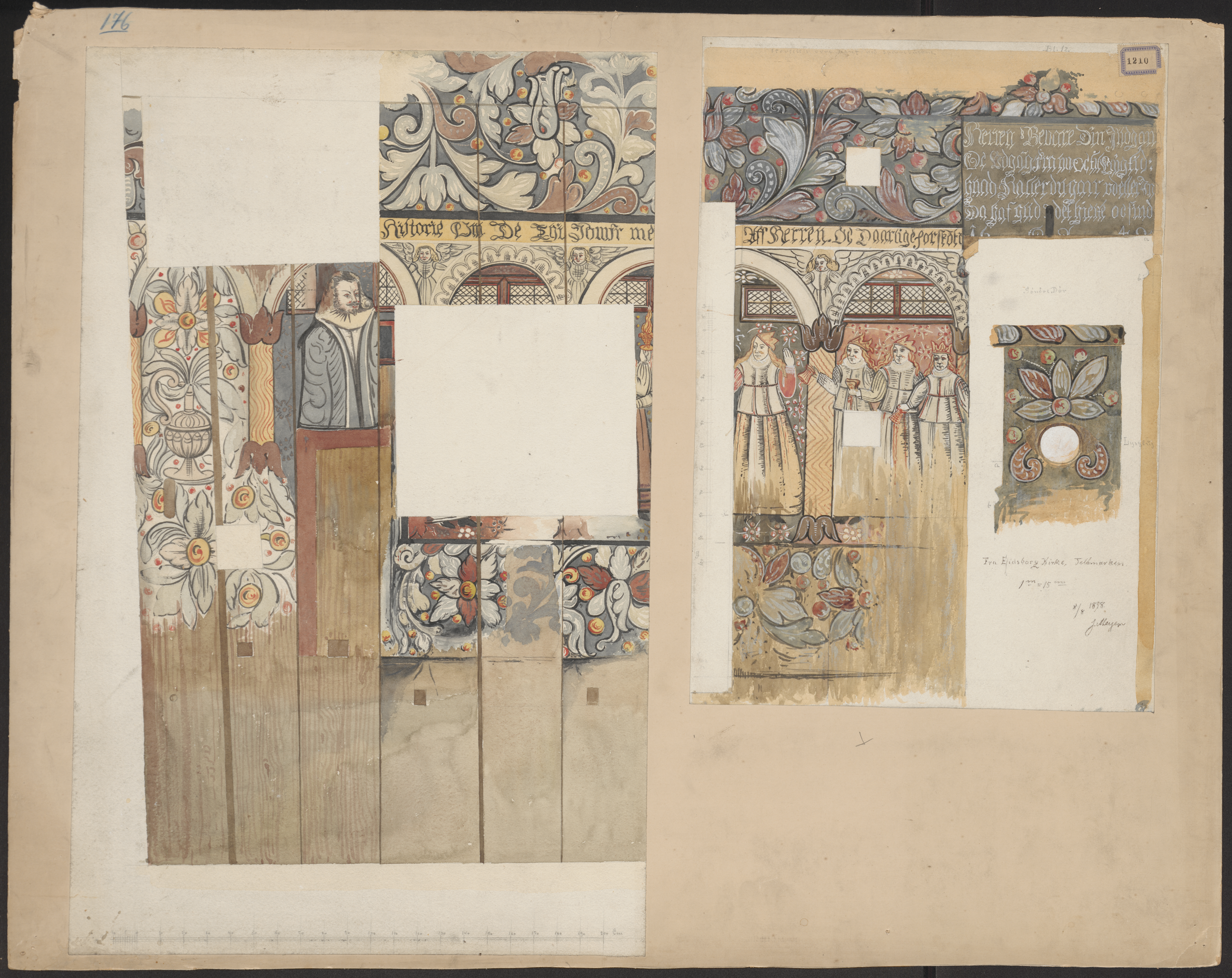
Murals around the church's south entrance.

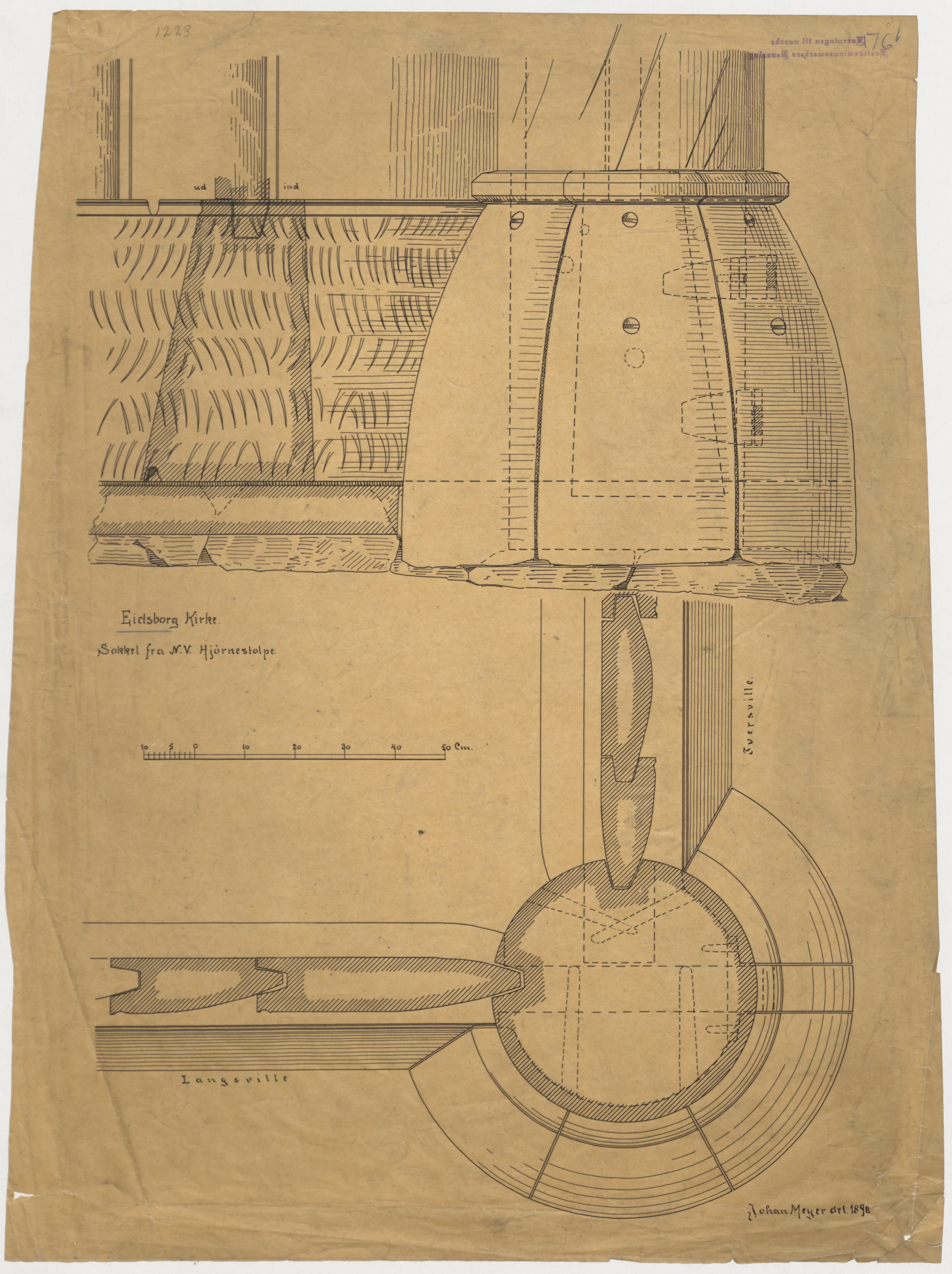
Form of plinth, northwest corner post.

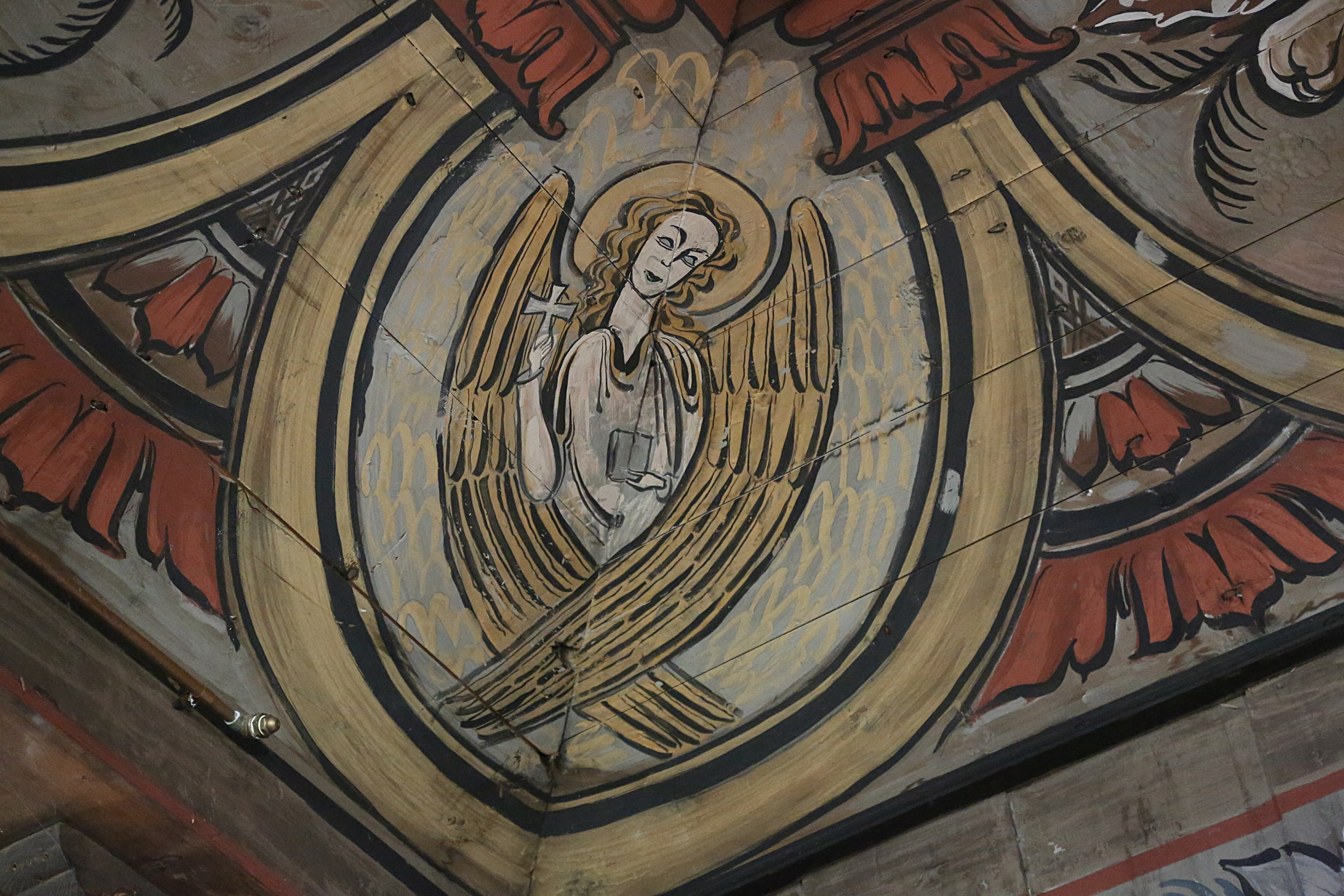
