= Lilleba Lund Kvandal =

Norwegian soprano singer (1940–2016)

- Born: Annbjørg Helene Lund; 21 April 1940; Oslo, Norway
- Died: 30 September 2016 (aged 76); Bærum, Norway
- Education: Oslo Conservatory of Music
- Occupation: Opera singer
- Spouse: Johan Kvandal (m. 1976; died 1999)
- Relatives: David Monrad Johansen (father-in-law)

Annbjørg Helene "Lilleba" Lund Kvandal (21 April 1940 – 30 September 2016) was a Norwegian soprano singer and song teacher.

She was born in Oslo to Casper Lund and Signe Jensen, and was married to composer Johan Kvandal from 1976. She studied at the Oslo Conservatory of Music and further in Hamburg, Munich and Zagreb. She made her concert debut in Augsburg in 1963. Between 1963 and 1970 she was assigned with various opera houses in Germany. In 1966, she won third prize in the ARD International Music Competition.

She edited the folk song collection Norske folkeviser gjennom tusen år from 2000, based on the song collections of Catharinus Elling, Ludvig Mathias Lindeman and others. The collection includes children's songs (lullabies, singing games), youth songs, shieling songs and melodies (calls, nymph songs, and tunes for zither, flute and goat horn), medieval ballads, comic ballads, and hymns.

With her husband, who died in 1999, she resided at Gyssestad in Bærum. She died in 2016.
