= Åsmund Åmli Band =

Norwegian band

- Origin: Valle Municipality, Setesdal, Norway
- Genres: Country, rock
- Years active: 1996-present
- Members: Åsmund Åmli (Bass guitar); Bjørn Stiauren (Drums); Stian Øvland (Guitar); Dag Wolf (Pedal steel guitar)
- Past members: Arne Vigeland (Pedal steel guitar)
- Website: http://www.amliband.no

Åsmund Åmli Band is a Norwegian country/rock band from Valle Municipality in Setesdal, formed in 1996. They have sold more than 20,000 albums worldwide and are one of Norway's most successful country bands.

== Members ==
=== Current members ===
- Åsmund Åmli – lead vocals, bass
- Bjørn Stiauren - drums
- Stian Øvland - guitar
- Dag Wolf - pedal steel guitar

=== Former members ===
- Arne Vigeland - pedal steel guitar

== Discography ==
=== Studio albums ===
Album title	Release date
Bjorøyl	2003
Panorama	June 16, 2008

=== EPs ===
Album title	Release date
No e det på det gamaste	2000
