= Åsmund Frægdegjevar (album) =

Studio album by Lumsk
- Released: 2003
- Genre: Folk metal, Progressive metal
- Length: 58:20
- Label: Spinefarm

Lumsk chronology
| Åsmund Frægdegjevar (EP) (2002) | Åsmund Frægdegjevar (2003) | Troll (2005) |

Åsmund Frægdegjevar is the first full-length album by the Norwegian folk metal band Lumsk. It was released on August 25, 2003 by Spinefarm. A concept album, it adapts the Norwegian legend Åsmund Frægdegjevar into an experimental folk metal project.

== Track listing ==
1. "Det var Irlands kongi bold" – 2:08
2. "Ormin lange" – 4:44
3. "Skip under lide" – 5:34
4. "I trollehender" – 3:11
5. "Hår som spunnid gull" – 2:08
6. "Slepp meg" – 4:23
7. "Skomegyvri" – 6:24
8. "Olafs belti" – 4:45
9. "I lytinne två" – 3:54
10. "Langt nord i Trollebotten" – 3:33
11. "Fagran fljotan folen" – 7:23
12. "Kampen mot bergetrolli" – 4:07
13. "Der e ingin dag'e" – 6:06
