= Åsmund Forfang =

Norwegian writer

Åsmund Forfang (born 22 May 1952) is a Norwegian writer. He has written several novels, short story collections, and children's books. He has also issued two non-fiction books, about the mining communities of Kopperå and Løkken Verk.
