= Lumsk =

Norwegian folk metal band

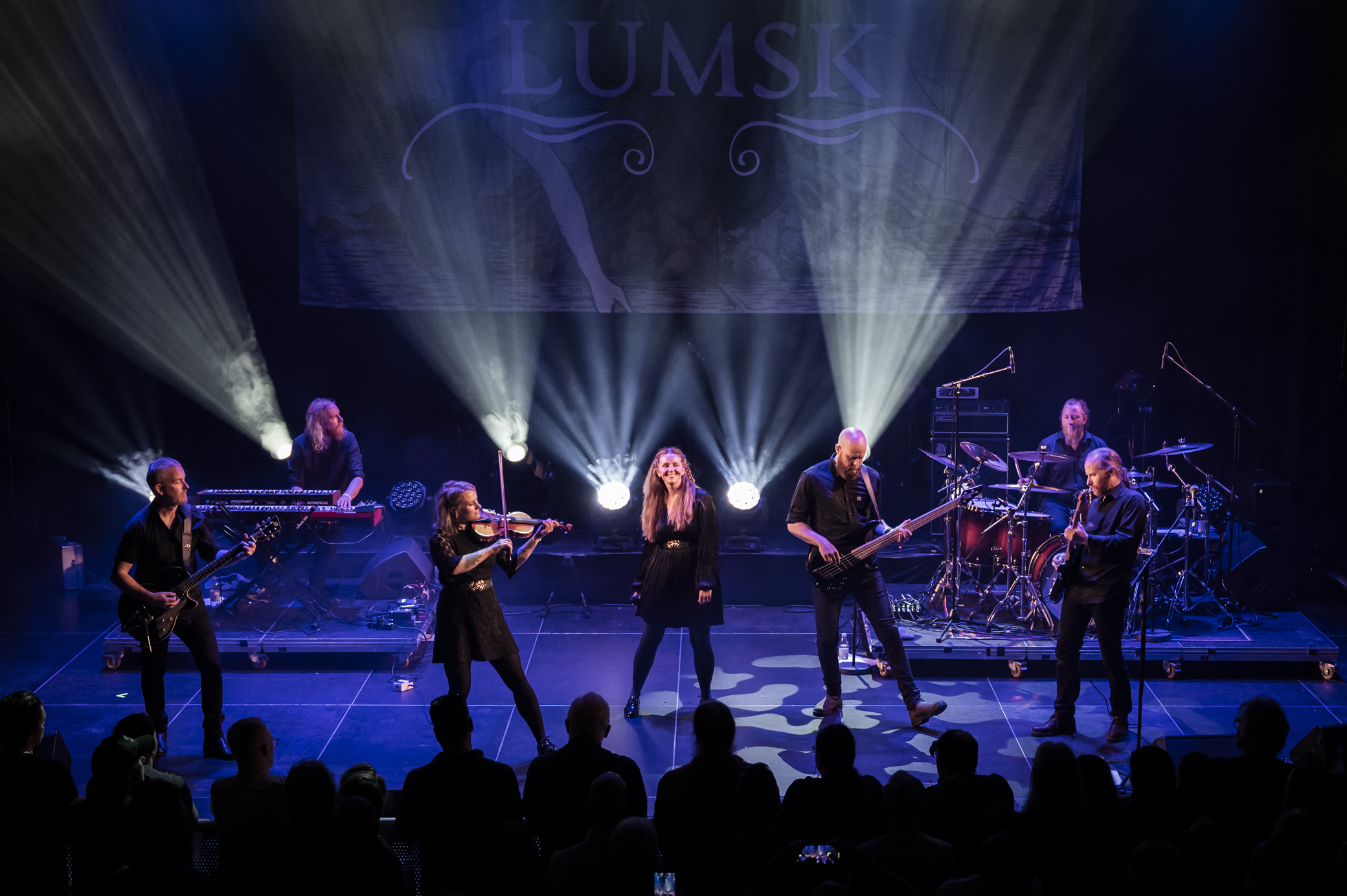
- Lumsk in 2024

Background information
- Origin: Trondheim, Norway
- Genres: Folk metal, folk rock, progressive rock
- Years active: 1999 - present
- Label: Dark Essence Records
- Members: Annelise Ofstad Aar; Vidar Berg; Ketil Sæther; Espen Warankov Godø; Eystein Garberg; Siv Lena Laugtug Sæther; Espen Hammer
- Website: lumsk.bandcamp.com

Lumsk is a Norwegian folk metal band from Trondheim. The band combines traditional Norwegian folk music and folklore with rock, progressive rock and metal. The group has both male and female vocals with violin, guitar and drums.

== History ==
After having released a self-produced demo, the band released an EP called Åsmund Frægdegjevar in 2001 under contract with the record company Spinefarm Records. The next year, the band moved to Tabu Recordings and released their debut album, which had the same title as the previously released EP. The album was characterized by its blend of classical instruments and heavy metal. The songs make up a narrative about the saga of Åsmund, who in Lumsk's interpretation sails from Ireland to rescue a king's daughter from a group of trolls.

Several years later, and with a new vocalist, the band released its second album, called Troll. The album was a departure in many ways from its predecessor - the band had gotten a new vocalist and guitarist, and as a whole the music was not as heavy or dark as on the debut album. There were also fewer songs, and together they did not compose one narrative, but were rather stories in and of themselves; stories which were based on Nordic mythology and were written by the saga author Birger Sivertsen and his wife Kristin.

The same year the band released the single Nidvisa, which, in addition to the song Allvis from Troll, contained a song written for the action group Give Us Back Christmas (Gi oss jula tilbake in Norwegian) in protest against department stores' early Christmas decorating. The profits from the sale of the single also went to the group.

On February 26, 2007, Lumsk released their third full-length album, entitled Det Vilde Kor. On this album, Lumsk have added music to Det Vilde Kor, which is a collection of poems written by the famous Norwegian poet Knut Hamsun. With this album the music departed from its folk metal sound and incorporated a calmer and slightly more progressive nature.

In July 2007 Espen announced on Lumsk's website that Ketil and Siv Lena would be leaving the band due to a baby being born. They were replaced by Swedish musicians Håkan Lundqvist and Jenny Gustafsson. In 2009 Annelise Ofstad Aar joined the band, as a replacement for vocalist Stine Mari Langstrand, who also left in 2007.

On May 5, 2023 Lumsk released Fremmede toner, under their new label Dark Essence Records. On October 30, 2026, they released Einsemda.

== Members ==
=== Current ===
- Espen Warankov Godø - keyboards (2000-)
- Eystein Garberg - guitar (2001-)
- Espen Hammer - bass guitar (2002-)
- Roar Grindheim - guitar (2012-)
- Vidar Berg - drums (2005-)
- Mari Klingen - vocals (2020-)
- Siv Lena Laugtug Sæther – violin (2001–2007, 2021 -)

=== Former ===
- Snorre Hovdal - bass guitar and backing vocals
- Bjørnar Selsbak - guitar
- Øyvind R - guitar
- Vibeke Arntzen - vocals
- Sondre Øien - bass guitar
- Steinar Årdal - male vocals
- Alf Helge Lund - drums (1999–2005)
- Ketil Sæther - guitar (2004–2007 - 2009–2012)
- Stine Mari Langstrand - vocals (2004–2007)
- Håkan Lundqvist - guitar (2007)
- Jenny Gustafsson - violin (2007)
- Annelise Ofstad Aar - vocals (2009-2019)

== Discography ==
=== Albums ===
- Åsmund Frægdegjevar (2003)
- Troll (2005)
- Det Vilde Kor (2007)
- Fremmede Toner (2023)
- Einsemda (2026)

=== Demos and singles ===
- Demo 2001 (demo, 2001)
- Nidvisa (single, 2005)
- Det Døde Barn/Das Tode Kind (single, 2023)
