= Åsmund Reikvam =

Norwegian scientist and politician

Åsmund Ragnar Reikvam (born 1944 in Førde) is a Norwegian professor in medicine and former politician.

== Education ==
He graduated as dr. med. in 1976 and became a specialist in Internal medicine and Heart disease in 1981. He worked at Ullevål university hospital and Sogn og Fjordane central hospital, the latter as head physician in 1983–1984 and 1989–1992. In 1999 he was appointed professor in pharmacotherapeutics at the University of Oslo.

== Career ==
Before moving to Oslo he was a member of municipal council of Førde Municipality for eight years, representing the Labour Party. His brother Rolf Reikvam is a national legislator.

Reikvam graduated from Medical School, University of Oslo, in 1970, and was a research fellow at the Institute of Physiology, Faculty of Medicine, University of Oslo, where he gained his PhD degree in 1976 with a thesis on “Activation and proliferation of macrophages.”

Reikvam had his main clinical training at Ullevaal University Hospital, Oslo, and became specialist in cardiology and in internal medicine in 1981. After additional education at the University of Oslo in 1987 he received the Master of Health Administration degree. He has served as chair of the Department of Medicine and Cardiology, Central Hospital of Sogn and Fjordane, and was the medical director of the hospital. He has been director of research Forum, the research organisation of Ullevaal University Hospital, chair of the Department of Pharmacotherapeutics, University of Oslo and since 1999 professor of pharmacotherapeutics, now at the Institute of Clinical Medicine, University of Oslo.

He has been a member of the steering committees of important clinical trials, including the International Studies of Infarct Survival, ISIS2, ISIS3, ISIS4, and the EU funded trials of the European Secondary Prevention Study Group and, furthermore, a national co-ordinator of HOPE and GUARDIAN. He has extensive experience in clinical research. In recent years his main scientific interest has been pharmacotherapy and pharmacoepidemiology of cardiovascular diseases, particularly management of myocardial infarction. He is the author or co-author of 250 scientific papers and has published in reputable journals, including Nature, the Lancet, BMJ, Heart, Journal of Internal Medicine, European Heart Journal, European Journal of Clinical Pharmacology, and British Journal of Clinical Pharmacology.

Reikvam has served on the scientific boards of main granting agencies, including the Research Council of Norway and the Foundation for Health and Rehabilitation, chairman for ten years, and at present a member of the board of the organisation. Until recently he has been chair of the Norwegian Society of Pharmacoepidemiology. He is a member of The Adverse Drug Committee of the Norwegian Medical Agency. Reikvam is a Fellow of the European Society of Cardiology (FESC) and a member of the Working Group of Cardiovascular Pharmacology and Drug Therapy of the society. He has been a member of EMEA's (European Medicines Agency) pharmacovigilance working party and has had health care evaluation assignments for OECD.

Reikvam has had leading positions within the Norwegian Medical Association (NMA), including chair of a regional department and a member of the NMA's chief decision-making body, the Representative Body. He has been active in politics and has been a member of a town council (councilor) and has also served as alderman.
