= Åsmund Asdal =

Norwegian biologist and agronomist

Åsmund Asdal (born 1957) is a Norwegian biologist and agronomist, employed at Nordic Genetic Resource Center (NordGen) as Coordinator of Operation and Management of the Svalbard Global Seed Vault(SGSV).

He facilitates seed deposits in the SGSV from the international community of gene banks and research institutes holding seed collections of plant genetic resources, and is responsible for information and media visits to the Seed Vault.

From 2001 to 2015 he managed the Norwegian national program for plant genetic resources at the Norwegian Genetic Resource Centre. He has also conducted research for the Norwegian Institute for Agricultural and Environmental Research (Bioforsk), the Norwegian Genetic Resources Centre and the Norwegian Crop Research Institute.

Publications include Fra forsøksgården på Landvik til Norsk institutt for Planteforskning:Planteforsk Landvik 50 år (2000) and Kompostkvalitet - dokumentasjon og anbefalinger: rapport fra prosjektet Utvikling av kompostprodukter (2002).
