= David Monrad Johansen =

Norwegian composer (1888–1974)

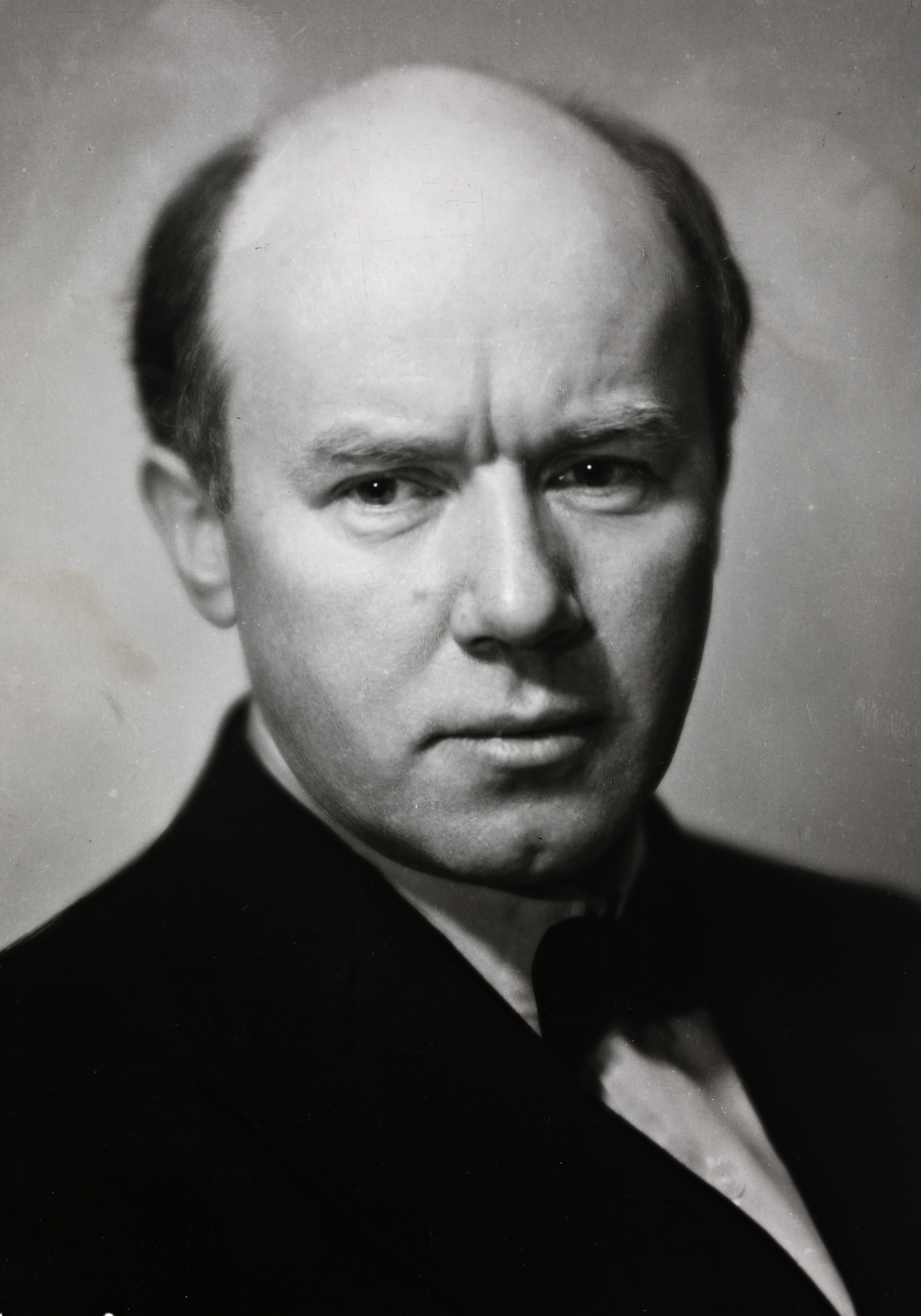
Portrait of David Monrad Johansen (1888-1974)

David Monrad Johansen (8 November 1888 – 20 February 1974) was a Norwegian composer.

He was born in Vefsn Municipality and grew up near Mosjøen, where he received his first piano lessons. He came to Christiania (Oslo) in 1904 to study at the conservatory there, and he continued taking lessons with Catharinus Elling, Iver Holter and others until he went to Berlin in 1915 for further studies. In 1920, he went for a study trip to Paris, and here Stravinsky’s music came to make a huge impression on him. In addition he met Fartein Valen, which inspired him to start studying dissonant counterpoint. Later, in 1933 and 1935, he spent short periods abroad for further studies. Monrad Johansen’s study time was extraordinary diverse, and his development was affected by this.

It is difficult to categorise his style, with all the different influences that he went through. Before Berlin, he was within the conservative late romanticism, clearly influenced by Edvard Grieg. After Berlin, under the influence of Alf Hurum, he started studying the French Impressionist music, and around 1920 this style is apparent in his music. This was also a very productive period. At the same time, he was influenced by the nationalistic style. He several times used lyrics from Norse literature or Norwegian folk stories/songs, but seldom melodies. He did, however, arrange some folk tunes for piano (opus 9 and 10).

Monrad Johansen’s most famous piece is Voluspaa op. 15 (1926). It was composed for soloists/vocals, choir and orchestra, and it is based on the poem Voluspaa, from the Edda. This piece and the Nordlands Trompet op. 13, are the most pure nationalistic of Monrad Johansen’s works, and often called a Norwegian impressionism. Regarding sound, they are related to impressionism, but have structures with more polyphonic features than what was common in f. ex. Debussy’s impressionistic pieces. The basis for the music, which is clearly tonal, has modal features. Dorian, Phrygian and Lydian scales are often apparent. Even though Monrad Johansen had achieved significant recognition with these pieces, it was clear to him that the style was a dead-end, and the following pieces show a composer on a stylistic search. Then, during the studies in 1933 and 1935, he turned more into a neo-classical direction, more polyphonic, more clear tonality, classical forms – also more clear sound and colours, and fewer dissonances than in the 1930s.

Monrad Johansen had a very central position in Norwegian music life in the 1920s and 1930s. He was the leading person within the musical nationalism around 1925, after having achieved great recognition with the 7 songs to old Norwegian folk stories (opus 6) and the piece for male choir, Draumkvedet, opus 7. This position was strengthened when he got an artist scholarship (from 1925 to 1945).

During the German occupation of Norway in the course of World War II, Johansen joined the fascist party Nasjonal Samling and supported the collaborationist government of Vidkun Quisling, and during the period of 1942-1945 was a member of the Nazi-appointed Kulturting (Cultural Council). In the post-war Norwegian legal purge he was convicted of treason and sentenced to four years of forced labour.

David Monrad Johansen's son was the composer Johan Kvandal.
