= Johan Kvandal =

Norwegian composer (1919–1999)

- Born: 8 September 1919; Kristiania
- Died: 16 February 1999 (aged 79); Bærum
- Occupation: Composer
- Spouse: Lilleba Lund Kvandal
- Father: David Monrad Johansen

David Johan Kvandal (né Johansen; 8 September 1919 – 16 February 1999) was a Norwegian composer.

== Career ==
He was born in Kristiania to David Monrad Johansen and Amunda Holmsen, with the family later moving to Bærum where Kvandal died.

He took his studies in conducting and organ at Oslo Conservatory, and studied composition from Marx at the Hochschule für Musik, Vienna, and Boulanger in Paris. He served as a music critic for the Oslo newspapers Morgenposten and Aftenposten, and as organist of the Vålenengen Church in Oslo. Many of his works utilize folk elements. Among his compositions are Norsk ouverture from 1951, Skipper Worse-suite for a television drama series from 1968, Norske stevtoner from 1974, and Balladen om Heming unge from 1984. His opera Mysterier, with libretto based on Hamsun's novel, was staged at Den Norske Opera in 1994.

He was married twice, first to Maria Teresia Unterrainer (from 1951), and from 1976 to Lilleba Lund.
