= Bjørneboe =

Bjørneboe is a surname. Notable people with the surname include:

- Agnete Bjørneboe (born 1943), Tanzanian-born Danish artist and educator
- Jens Bjørneboe (1920–1976), Norwegian writer
- Sven Kærup Bjørneboe (born 1943), Norwegian essayist
- Therese Bjørneboe (born 1963), Norwegian theatre critic and editor
