= Oslo Waldorf School =

School in Oslo, Norway

Coordinates: 59°56′57″N 10°39′32″E

Oslo Waldorf School (Norwegian: Rudolf Steinerskolen i Oslo) is a Waldorf school located in the Vestre Holmen area in the Vestre Aker district of West End Oslo, Norway. It is an integrated primary, middle and high school with around 550 pupils. Founded in 1926, it is one of the oldest Waldorf schools worldwide. The school is an independent non-profit foundation, receives government funding and is officially recognized under the Private School Act as equivalent to public schools, its diplomas qualifying for entry into higher education and other schools. It is a member of the Norwegian Association of Waldorf Schools. Many of its alumni have been noted in the arts, politics and other areas of society, and include the former NATO secretary-general and prime minister Jens Stoltenberg.

== History ==
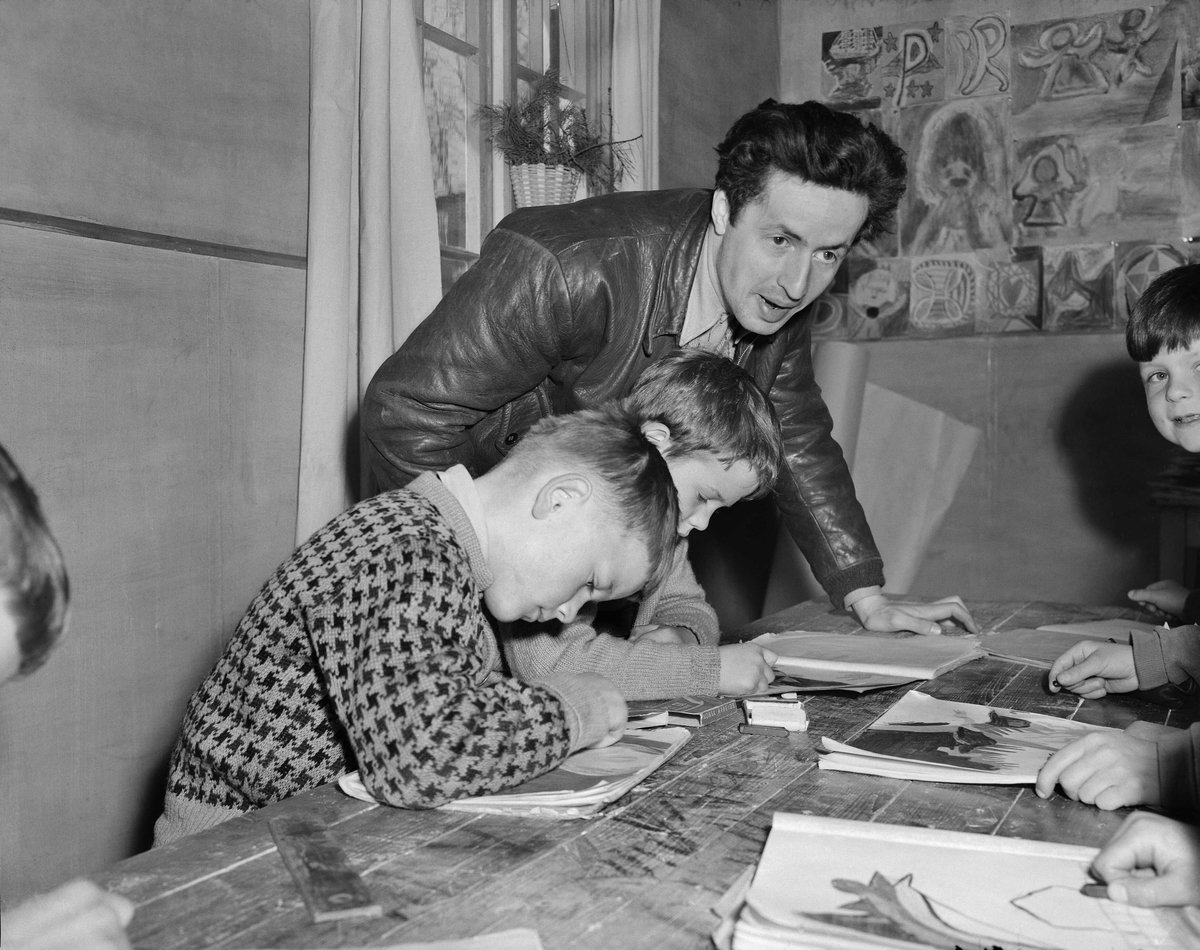
Novelist Jens Bjørneboe teaching at Oslo Waldorf School in 1952

In November 1921, two years after the first Waldorf School was founded in Stuttgart, Austrian philosopher Rudolf Steiner held two lectures on education at the Norwegian Nobel Institute in Oslo (then named Christiania), and the plan to establish a Waldorf school in Oslo was conceived. Among those involved was Bokken Lasson, who also became one of the first teachers when the school was established in 1926. The school was originally located in Oscars gate in the Frogner district. As of 1932, the school had 102 pupils. Due to financial difficulties, the school had to close in 1936. Vult Simon and Gulle Brun however continued to operate a small Waldorf school in their home at Makrellbekken. In the autumn of 1945 the school was reestablished, and was located in a barracks in Frogner Park. In 1949, the school moved to Smestad, and in 1962, it moved to Hovseter, where it is still located. Its building complex has been successively extended over the years in different architectural styles.

Prior to 1961, the school received no public funding, and was funded entirely by tuition and gifts. The school became entitled to regular public funding under the Private School Act of 1970. Originally a primary school and later also a middle school, the first high school class was established in 1978. The school is organized as a non-profit foundation that is governed by a board consisting of representatives of the teachers and parents.

In Norway, anthroposophy in general and the Waldorf schools in particular have been strongly associated with the cultural and intellectual elite of the country since the early 20th century.

Frauke Stuhl og Jan Hecker-Stempehl noted that "the model was originally the German Waldorf school, which was founded in Stuttgart in 1919, but in Norway, emphasis has been placed on applying Steiner's educational principles within a Norwegian cultural context. Therefore, the school is not a German school, but it still conveys German language and culture to a much greater extent than the public school does. Thus, it is not only in the educational principles that we find the German influence; it is also clearly present in the curriculum. In language education, German lessons hold a central place as German is taught over 12 years (...) In the lower grades, significant emphasis is placed on the oral rendition of stories, legends, and fairy tales, where, for example, Goethe's poems (...) and the Brothers Grimm's fairy tales occupy a central place. In literature education, the great classical texts play an important role. In the advanced levels, students read, among other works, Wolfram von Eschenbach's Parsifal and Goethe's Faust. The many theater performances are also part of the school's profile, with Schiller's Joan of Arc and Wilhelm Tell belonging to the school's repertoire."

The arts play a major role in the school curriculum and the broader activities surrounding the school, and the school includes a professionally equipped theater hall. The famous Norwegian novelist Jens Bjørneboe worked as a teacher at the school in the 1950s and a private school obviously modelled after Oslo Waldorf School has a significant role in his Jonas novel, which is noted for its criticism of the public school system. He later published the book Under en mykere himmel; brev og bud fra en Steinerskole ("Under a softer sky; letters and messages from a Waldorf school") based on his work as a Waldorf teacher.

Among the school's alumni and parents are many noted individuals, particularly within the arts and the cultural sphere, but also within politics and business. Pupils have are often enrolled shortly after birth due to its waiting lists. Among the school's alumni is former Labour leader, Prime Minister and NATO Secretary-General Jens Stoltenberg, and all three children of Labour leader and Prime Minister Jonas Gahr Støre attended the school. Stoltenberg has written about his time at the school in his biography Min history (My Story). The school and the Waldorf movement in general was a stronghold of the Riksmål language of the traditional elite during the Norwegian language struggle, and the school is still using the now classic alphabet book André Bjerkes ABC, published by Riksmålsforbundet in 1959.

== Alumni ==
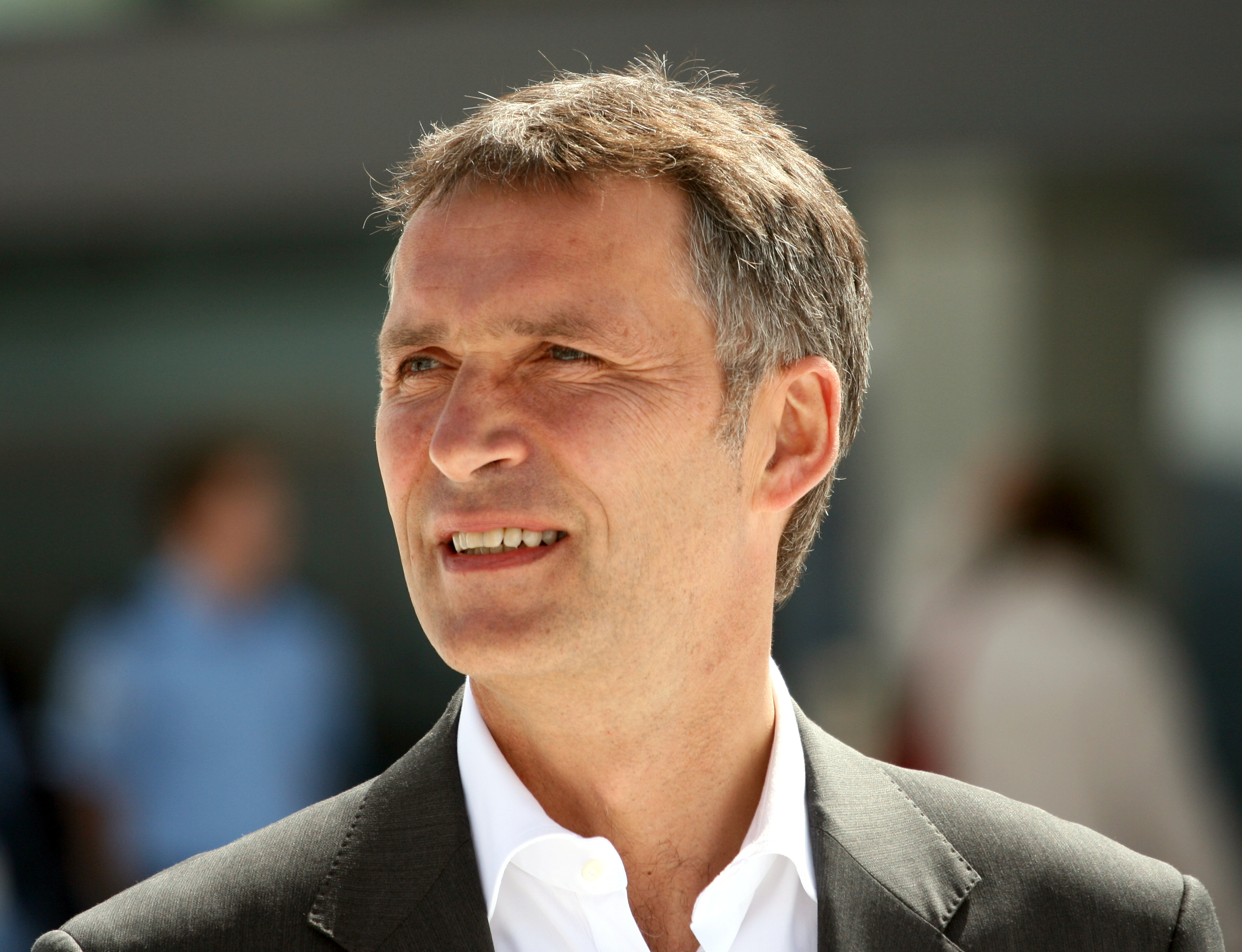
Jens Stoltenberg, former Secretary General of NATO and Prime Minister of Norway

- Jon Almaas, TV personality
- Peder Anker, historian
- Lene Berg, film director
- Ketil Bjørnstad, composer and author
- Nicolai Cleve Broch, actor
- Erik Fosnes Hansen, author
- Kjersti Holmen, actress
- Angelina Jordan, singer
- Henning Kraggerud, violinist
- Lars Lillo-Stenberg, singer-songwriter
- Anneke von der Lippe, actress
- Odd Nerdrum, painter
- Petter Olsen, shipping magnate
- Marcus Paus, composer
- Kristian Siem, industrialist
- Njål Sparbo, opera singer
- Camilla Stoltenberg, Director-General of the Norwegian Institute of Public Health
- Jens Stoltenberg, former Secretary General of NATO and Prime Minister of Norway
