= Thomas Taylor (Neoplatonist) =

English translator and Neoplatonist (1758–1835)

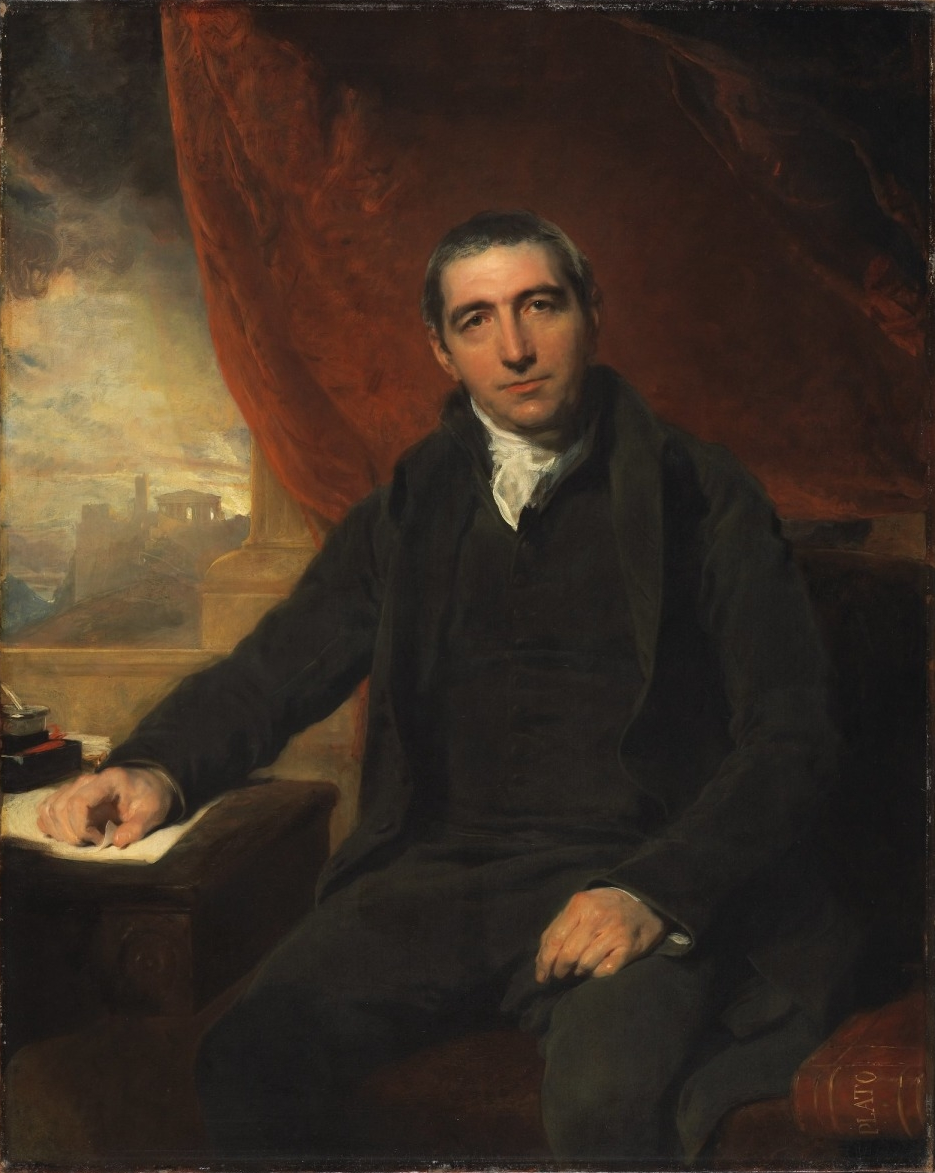
Portrait of Thomas Taylor by Sir Thomas Lawrence, about 1812, from the National Gallery of Canada, Ottawa. In the background the Acropolis of Athens is silhouetted against a fiery sky, and by Taylor's left hand is a copy of his translation of the works of Plato.

Thomas Taylor (15 May 1758 – 1 November 1835) was an English translator and Neoplatonist, the first to translate into English the complete works of Aristotle and of Plato, as well as the Orphic fragments.

== Biography ==
Thomas Taylor was born in London on 15 May 1758, the son of a staymaker Joseph Taylor and his wife Mary (born Summers). He was educated at St. Paul's School, and devoted himself to the study of the classics and of mathematics. Initially he worked as a clerk in Lubbock's Bank and wasted his idle time on phlogiston theory and squaring the circle. Soon he was appointed Assistant Secretary to the Society for the Encouragement of Arts, Manufactures, and Commerce (precursor to the Royal Society of Arts), in which capacity he made many influential friends, who furnished the means for publishing his various translations, which besides Plato and Aristotle, include Proclus, Porphyry, Apuleius, Ocellus Lucanus and other Neoplatonists and Pythagoreans. His aim was the translation of all the untranslated writings of the ancient Greek philosophers.

Taylor was an admirer of Hellenism, most especially in the philosophical framework furnished by Plato and the Neoplatonists Proclus and the "most divine" Iamblichus, whose works he translated into English. So enamoured was he of the ancients, that he and his wife talked to one another only in classical Greek.

He was also an outspoken voice against corruption in the Christianity of his day, and what he viewed as its shallowness. Taylor was ridiculed and acquired many enemies, but in other quarters he was well received. Among his friends was the eccentric traveller and philosopher John "Walking" Stewart, whose gatherings Taylor was in the habit of attending.

== Religious views ==
Taylor described himself as a Platonist but did not elaborate on his beliefs or practices. Isaac D'Israeli's novel Vaurien includes a parody of Taylor which depicts him as depicting in elaborate pagan ceremonies; however, D'Israeli does not appear to have known Taylor personally. An anonymous essay in Fraser's Magazine printed in 1875, forty years after Taylor's death, claims that he had turned one of the rooms in his home into a Roman sacrarium and performed sacrifices there.

== Family ==
Taylor eloped and married his childhood sweetheart Mary Morton, daughter of John Morton, in 1777, and they had children George Burrow Taylor (born 1779), John Buller Taylor (1781), William Grainger Taylor (1783-1785), Mary Joseph Taylor (1789) and Thomas Taylor (1791). Their eldest daughter, Mary Meredith Taylor (1787–1861), was named after his generous patron William Meredith and married a haberdasher, Samuel Beverly Jones. His wife Mary died in 1809. He married again, and his second wife Susannah died in 1823. From his second marriage he had one son, Thomas Proclus Taylor (born 1816).

Thomas Taylor died in Walworth. His gravesite is unknown.

== Influence ==
The texts that he used had been edited since the 16th century, but were interrupted by lacunae; Taylor's understanding of the Platonists informed his suggested emendations. His translations were influential on William Blake, Percy Bysshe Shelley, and William Wordsworth. In American editions they were read by Ralph Waldo Emerson, Bronson Alcott, and G. R. S. Mead, secretary to Helena Blavatsky of the Theosophical Society.

Taylor also published several original works on philosophy (in particular, the Neoplatonism of Proclus and Iamblichus) and mathematics. These works have been republished (some for the first time since Taylor's lifetime) by the Prometheus Trust.

The young Mary Wollstonecraft lived as a guest in Taylor's home and called his study "the abode of peace.". Taylor responded to Wollstonecraft's A Vindication of the Rights of Men and later A Vindication of the Rights of Woman in his satirical essay, A Vindication of the Rights of Brutes. In it, Taylor attempted to demonstrate the extent of Wollstonecraft's arguments by asking if the position was equally sound when applied to men and women, why not for plants and animals too? Despite its satirical intent, historian Peder Anker has called it "the first defense of animal rights".

== List of works ==
- 1780
  - The Elements of a New Method of Reasoning in Geometry, applied to the Rectification of the Circle
- 1782
  - Ocellus Lucanus on the Nature of the Universe (see 1831 for later edition)
- 1787
  - The Mystical Initiations or Hymns of Orpheus, with a preliminary Dissertation on the Life and Theology of Orpheus
  - Concerning the Beautiful; or, a paraphrase translation from the Greek of Plotinus, Ennead I. Book VI.
- 1788-89
  - The Philosophical and Mathematical Commentaries of Proclus on the First Book of Euclid's Elements, and his Life by Marinus. With a preliminary Dissertation on the Platonic Doctrine of Ideas. To which are added A History of the Restoration of the Platonic Theology by the later Platonists, 2 vols. (see 1792 for second revised edition)
- 1790
  - A Dissertation on the Eleusinian and Bacchic Mysteries
- 1792
  - A Vindication of the Rights of Brutes
  - The Phædrus of Plato: A Dialogue Concerning Beauty and Love
  - An Essay on the Beautiful, from the Greek of Plotinus
  - The Philosophical and Mathematical Commentaries of Proclus on the First Book of Euclid's Elements, and his Life by Marinus. With a preliminary Dissertation on the Platonic Doctrine of Ideas. To which are added A History of the Restoration of the Platonic Theology by the later Platonists, 2 vols.
- 1793
  - Sallust on the Gods and the World, and the Pythagoric Sentences of Demophilus, and Five Hymns by Proclus; to which are added Five Hymns by the translator.
  - Two Orations of the Emperor Julian, one to the Sovereign Sun, and the other to the Mother of the Gods; with Notes and a copious Introduction
  - Four Dialogues of Plato: The Cratylus, Phædo, Parmenides and Timæus.
- 1794
  - Pausanias's Description of Greece (see 1824 for second edition, enlarged)
  - Five Books of Plotinus, viz. On Felicity; on the Nature and Origin of Evil; on Providence; on Nature, Contemplation, and the One; and on the Descent of the Soul.
- 1795
  - The Fable of Cupid and Psyche; to which are added a Poetical Paraphrase on the Speech of Diotima in the Banquet of Plato; Four Hymns, With an Introduction, in which the meaning of the Fable is unfolded.
- 1801
  - Aristotle's Metaphysics, to which is added a Dissertation on Nullities and Diverging Series
- 1803
  - Hedric's Greek Lexicon (Graecum Lexicon Manuale, primum a Benjamine Hederico)
- 1804
  - Four letters from Thomas Taylor, the Platonist, to Charles Taylor, Secretary of the Society of Arts, 1800-1804.
  - An Answer to Dr. Gillies's Supplement to his New Analysis of Aristotle's Works
  - The Dissertations of Maximus Tyrius, 2 vols.
  - The Works of Plato, viz. His Fifty-Five Dialogues and Twelve Epistles, 5 vols.
- 1805
  - Miscellanies in Prose and Verse, containing the Triumph of the Wise Man over Fortune according to the doctrine of the Stoics and Platonists; the Creed of the Platonic Philosopher; a Panegyric on Sydenham (see 1820 for 2nd Edition, with additions)
- 1806
  - Collectanea; or Collections consisting of Miscellanies inserted in the European and Monthly Magazines. With an Appendix containing some Hymns never before printed.
- 1807
  - The Treatises of Aristotle on the Heavens (see also v.7 of The Works of Aristotle, 1812)
- 1809
  - The Elements of the true Arithmetic of Infinites. In which all the Propositions on the Arithmetic of Infinites invented by Dr. Wallis relative to the summation of fluxions are demonstrated to be false, and the nature of infinitesimals is unfolded.
  - The History of Animals of Aristotle and his Treatise on Physiognomy (see also v.8 of The Works of Aristotle, 1812)
  - The Arguments of the Emperor Julian against the Christians, to which are added Extracts from the other Works of Julian relative to the Christians.
- 1810
  - The Commentaries of Proclus on the Timæus of Plato (see 1820 for 2nd edition)
- 1811
  - The Rhetoric, Poetic and Nicomachean Ethics of Aristotle (see 1818 for 2nd edition)
- 1812
  - The Works of Aristotle, with copious Elucidations from the best of his Greek Commentators, 9 vols.
  - A Dissertation on the Philosophy of Aristotle
- 1816
  - A Dissertation on the Eleusinian and Bacchic Mysteries (2nd Edition)
  - Theoretic Arithmetic, in three books, containing the substance of all that has been written on this subject by Theo of Smyrna, Nicomachus, Iamblichus, and Boetius.
  - The Six Books of Proclus, the Platonic Successor, on the Theology of Plato, 2 vols.
- 1817
  - Remarks on the Dæmon of Socrates (article)
  - Use of Arches Known Among the Ancients (article)
  - Select Works of Plotinus, and Extracts from the Treatise of Synesius on Providence. With an Introduction containing the substance of Porphyry's Life of Plotinus
- 1818
  - Collection of the Chaldean Oracles (articles)
  - Orphic Fragments, hitherto inedited (article)
  - Remarks on the Passage in Stobæus (article)
  - On a Peculiar Signification of the words Demas and Soma (article)
  - The Rhetoric, Poetic and Nicomachean Ethics of Aristotle (2nd Edition), 2 vols.
  - Iamblichus' Life of Pythagoras, or Pythagoric Life, accompanied by fragments of the Ethical Writings of certain Pythagoreans in the Doric Dialect, and a Collection of Pythagoric Sentences from Stobæus and Others
- 1819
  - On the Philosophical Meaning of the words Bios, Kimena, Energema, and Sisthema (article)
  - On the Antiquity of Alchymy (article)
  - On the Coincidence between the Belts of the Planet Jupiter and the Fabulous Bonds of Jupiter the Demiurgus (article)
- 1820
  - Important Additions to the first Alcibiades, and Timæus of Plato (article)
  - Important Discovery of the Original of many of the Sentences of Sextus Pythagoricus (article)
  - Discovery of a Verse of Homer, and Error of Kiessling (article)
  - Platonic Demonstration of the Immortality of the Soul (article)
  - On the Theology of the Greeks (article)
  - Miscellanies in Prose and Verse, containing the Triumph of the Wise Man over Fortune according to the doctrine of the Stoics and Platonists; the Creed of the Platonic Philosopher; a Panegyric on Sydenham (2nd Edition, with additions)
  - The Commentaries of Proclus on the Timæus of Plato (2nd Edition), 2 vols.
- 1821
  - On the Mythology of the Greeks (article)
  - Notice of Professor Cousin's edition of the two first books of Proclus on the Parmenides of Plato (article)
  - Iamblichus on the Mysteries of the Egyptians, Chaldeans, and Assyrians
- 1822
  - Observations on Professor Cousin's edition of the Commentaries of Proclus on the first Alcibiades of Plato (article)
  - Observations on that part of a work entitled Empedoclis et Parmenidis Fragmenta (article)
  - The Metamorphosis, or Golden Ass, and Philosophical Works of Apuleius
  - Political Fragments of Archytas, Charondas, Zaleucus, and other ancient Pythagoreans, preserved by Stobæus, and also Ethical Fragments of Hierocles, the celebrated commentator on the Pythagoric verses preserved by the same author.
- 1823
  - The Elements of a new Arithmetical Notation and of a new Arithmetic of Infinites
  - Observations on the Creuzer's edition of the Commentary of Olympiodorus on the first Alcibiades of Plato (article)
  - Observations on the Scholia of Hermeas on the Phædrus of Plato (article)
  - Select Works of Porphyry, containing his Four Books on Abstinence from Animal Food; his Treatise on the Homeric Cave of the Nymphs, and his Auxiliaries to the perception of Intelligible Natures. With an Appendix explaining the Allegory of the Wanderings of Ulysses.
- 1824
  - Emendations of the text of Plato (article)
  - Observations on the Excerpta from the Scholia of Proclus on the Cratylus of Plato (article)
  - The Mystical Hymns of Orpheus, demonstrated to be the Invocations which were used in the Eleusinian Mysteries, with Considerable Emendations, Alterations, and Additions.
  - The Description of Greece by Pausanias, 2nd edition with considerable augmentations, 3 vols.
- 1825
  - Classical Allusion [to Democrates] (article)
  - Notice of Professor Cousin's edition of the third, fourth and fifth books of Proclus on the Parmenides of Plato (article)
  - Biblical Criticism (article)
  - The Fragments that remain of the Lost Writings of Proclus
- 1829
  - Corruption of Demiurgus (article)
  - Extracts from some of the Lost Works of Aristotle, Xenocrates, and Theophrastus (article)
- 1830
  - Arguments of Celsus, Porphyry, and the Emperor Julian, against the Christians
- 1831
  - Ocellus Lucanus on the Nature of the Universe. Taurus, the Platonic Philosopher, on the Eternity of the World; Julius Firmicus Maternus of the Thema Mundi, in which the positions of the stars at the commencement of the several mundane periods is (sic) given; Select Theorems on the Perpetuity of Time by Proclus
- 1833
  - Two Treatises of Proclus, the Platonic Successor, the former consisting of ten Doubts concerning Providence, and a Solution of those Doubts, and the latter containing a Development of the Nature of Evil.
- 1834
  - Translations from the Greek of the following treatises of Plotinus: On Suicide, to which is added an Extract from the Harl. MS. of the Scholia of Olympiodorus on the Phædo of Plato respecting Suicide. Two Books on Truly Existing Being, and Extracts from his Treatise on the manner in which the multitude of ideas subsists, and concerning the Good, with additional Notes from Porphyry and Proclus.
