= Dag Solstad =

Norwegian writer (1941–2025)

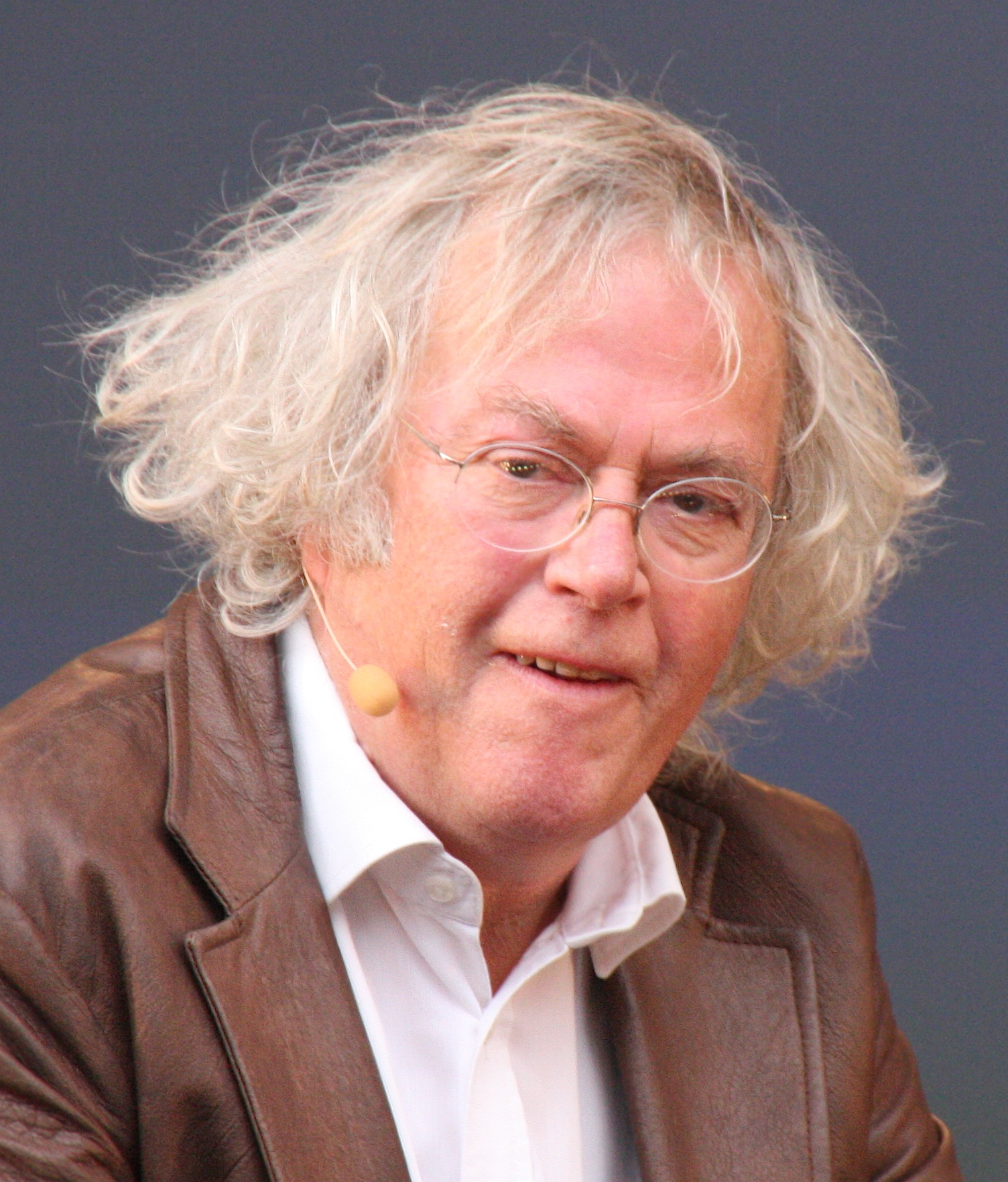
- Solstad in 2010
- Born: 16 July 1941; Sandefjord, Reichskommissariat Norwegen (today Norway)
- Died: 14 March 2025 (aged 83)
- Spouse: Therese Bjørneboe (m. 1995)
- Relatives: Jens Bjørneboe (father-in-law)
- Writing career
- Notable awards: Mads Wiel Nygaards Endowment (1969); Nordic Council Literature Prize (1989); Brage Prize (2006)

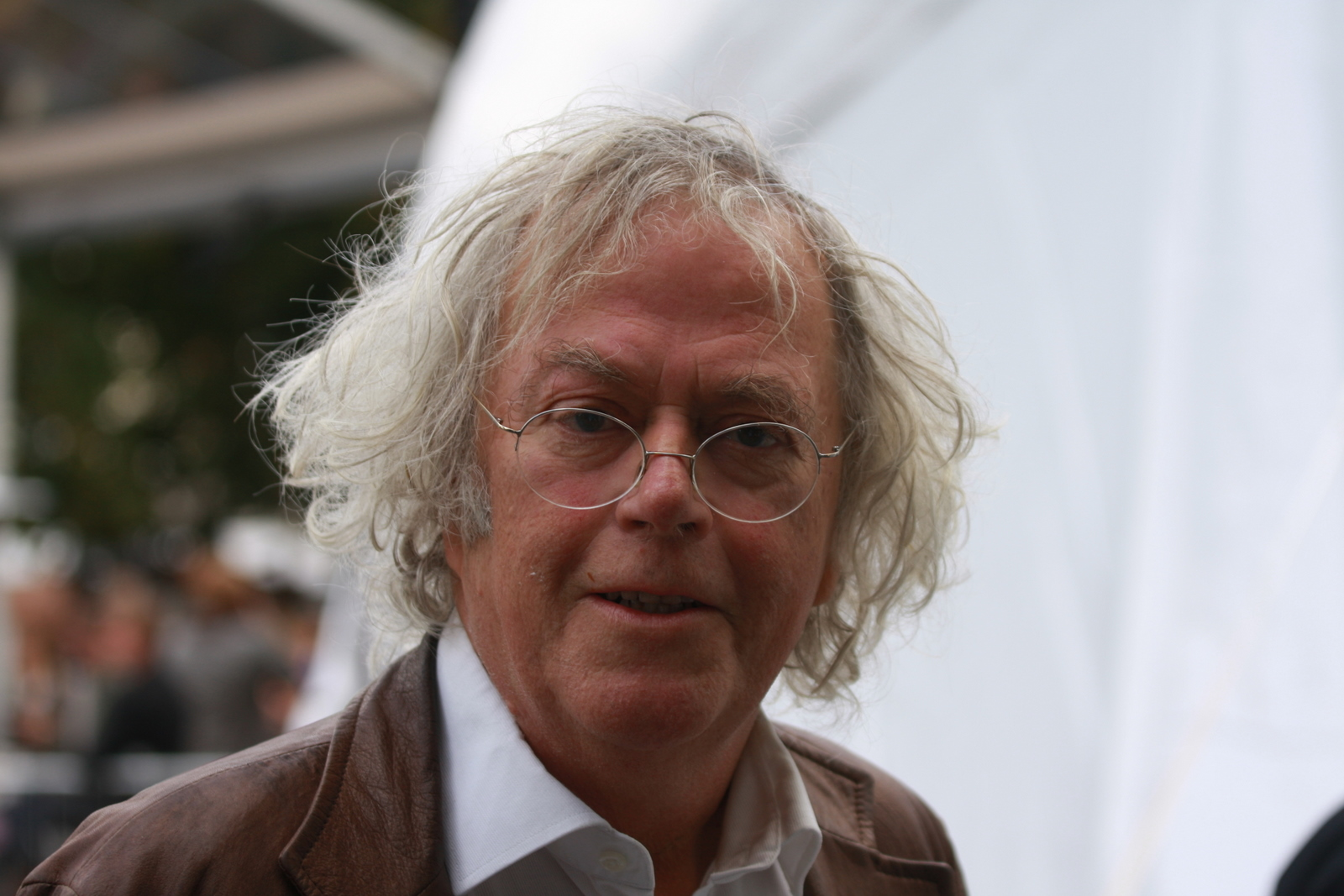
Solstad during the Oslo Bokfestival, 2010

Dag Solstad (16 July 1941 – 14 March 2025) was a Norwegian novelist, short-story writer and dramatist whose work has been translated into 20 languages.

Solstad wrote nearly 30 books and was the only author to have received the Norwegian Literary Critics' Award three times. Other awards include the Mads Wiel Nygaards Endowment in 1969, the Nordic Council Literature Prize in 1989, for Roman 1987 and the Brage Prize in 2006 for Armand V.

== Life and career ==
Solstad was born in Sandefjord to merchant Ole Modal Solstad and Ragna Sofie Tveitan. After receiving his examen artium, he worked as a teacher in Kabelvåg and as a journalist for the newspaper Tiden. He then enrolled at the University of Oslo, where he contributed to the literary magazine Profil. Solstad made his literary debut with Spiraler, a collection of short stories influenced by literary modernism, in 1965, and started working as a full-time writer the following year. His second book, the text collection Svingstol, came in 1967. In the late 1960s Solstad was strongly influenced by the Polish exile writer Witold Gombrowicz and his structural thinking, and Solstad presented his ideas in the literary magazine Vinduet in 1968.

Solstad made his debut as a novelist in 1969, with Irr! Grønt!. During the 1970s, he was a member of the maoist Workers' Communist Party. Political themes are present in several of his works from this time, such as the 1971 novel Arild Asnes, 1970.

In a study published in 1997, Øystein Rottem proposed four distinct phases in Solstad's authorship up to that time. The modernist phase (1965–1971) was followed by a realistic phase (1974–1980) with political activism. His works during this phase are the novel 25. septemberplassen (1974), the propaganda play Kamerat Stalin, eller familien Nordby (1975), and the war trilogy (1977, 1978, 1980). The third phase (after 1980–1990) is regarded as a period with self apologism. In 1982 the novel Gymnaslærer Pedersens beretning om den store politiske vekkelse som har hjemsøkt vårt land, about a politically active teacher in Larvik in the early 1970s, was published; a film adaptation, Gymnaslærer Pedersen, was made by director Hans Petter Moland in 2006. Several of Solstad's later works incorporate elements of autofiction, with the author himself present as a character, or events from his youth forming part of the story.

His first marriage was to Erna Irene Asp, from 1968. From 1983 to 1990 he was married to Tone Elisabeth Melgård. In 1995 he married journalist Therese Bjørneboe, and was thus son-in-law of writer Jens Bjørneboe.

Solstad lived part-time in Berlin and part-time in the Skillebekk neighbourhood of Oslo. He died on 14 March 2025, at the age of 83.

== Novels ==
- Irr! Grønt! (1969)
- Arild Asnes, 1970 (1971)
- 25. septemberplassen (1974)
- Svik. Førkrigsår (1977)
- Krig. 1940 (War. 1940; 1978)
- Brød og våpen (Bread and Weapons; 1980)
- Gymnaslærer Pedersens beretning om den store politiske vekkelse som har hjemsøkt vårt land (1982)
- Forsøk på å beskrive det ugjennomtrengelige (1984)
- Roman 1987 (Novel 1987; 1987)
- Medaljens forside (The Front of the Medal; 1990)
- Ellevte roman, bok atten (Novel 11, Book 18; 1992)
- Genanse og verdighet (Shyness and Dignity; 1994)
- Professor Andersens natt (Professor Andersen's Night; 1996)
- T. Singer – (1999)
- 16/07/41 – (2002)
- Armand V. Fotnoter til en uutgravd roman (Armand V. Footnotes from an Unexcavated Novel; 2006)
- 17. roman (Novel 17; 2009)
- Det uoppløselige episke element i Telemark i perioden 1591-1896 : roman (2013)
- Tredje, og siste, roman om Bjørn Hansen (2019)

== Other writings and assessment ==
With fellow novelist Jon Michelet, Solstad published a book after each of the FIFA World Cups in 1982, 1986, 1990, 1994 and 1998. He was also an essayist, mainly during the 1960s and 1970s. His essays from this period are published in the collection Artikler om litteratur 1966–1981 (1981), and essays from the next decade in 14 artikler på 12 år (1993).

In her PhD thesis Why So Big? A Literary Discourse Analysis of Dag Solstad's Authorship (University of Oslo, 2009), Inger Østenstad argues from different perspectives that Solstad is Norway's greatest contemporary writer, and uses a version of Dominique Maingueneau's discourse theory to analyse the components of oeuvre, reception, para-text and meta-text that in Solstad's case contribute to his established greatness. Peter Handke, Karl Ove Knausgaard and Per Petterson, three contemporary writers, regard Solstad highly for his literary excellence. Literary magazine The Paris Review compared Solstad's status in Norwegian literature to Philip Roth's status in American literature and Günter Grass' status in German literature; upon his death, prime minister Jonas Gahr Støre called him one of the most significant Norwegian authors of all time.

== Awards and prizes ==
- 1969: Mads Wiel Nygaard's Endowment
- 1969: Norwegian Critics Prize for Literature, for Irr! Grønt!
- 1982: Språklig samlings litteraturpris
- 1989: Nordic Council's Literature Prize
- 1992: Norwegian Critics Prize for Literature, for Novel 11, Book 18
- 1996: Dobloug Prize
- 1996: Gyldendalprisen
- 1998: Brage Prize Honorary Award
- 1999: Norwegian Critics Prize for Literature, for T. Singer
- 2004: Aschehoug Prize
- 2006: Brage Prize, for Armand V. Fotnoter til en uutgravd roman
- 2007: Vestfolds Litteraturpris
- 2017: Swedish Academy Nordic Prize
