= Vilde Bjerke =

Norwegian actress (born 1960)

Vilde Bjerke (born 1960) is a Norwegian actress and writer.

== Background ==
Bjerke is the daughter of actress Henny Moan and poet André Bjerke, the stepdaughter of Ole Paus - who started living with Moan in 1973 - and the sister of their child Sole Moan Paus. She is the former paternal sister-in-law of Olav Bjørshol, the father of Ari Behn.

== Career ==
Bjerke made her debut as a lyricist at the age of 13 in 1973 with the song "Blomsten" on Ole Paus' album Blues for Pyttsan Jespersen's relatives. Paus also wrote the song "Og en for Vilde" for her, released on the disc Ole Bull Show (also from 1973).

Bjerke attended Toneheim Folk High School and the Eastern Norway Conservatory of Music, where she trained as a viola player. In addition, she has taken intermediate courses in French, theatre studies and literature at the University of Oslo.

Bjerke has had several minor acting roles, including in Bentein Baardson's production of Peer Gynt on NRK, as well as in Magnus Nilsson's Solmomentet on Swedish SVT in 1989.

As an artist, Bjerke is best known for her album Alene (2004). Since 1978, she has worked actively to promote her father's writing.

Bjerke organises performances, has released CDs with verses from André Bjerke's children, and wrote the book Du visste om et land - Om min far André Bjerke in 2002. She currently resides in Lillehammer.
