= Angermüller =

Angermüller is a German surname. Notable people with the name include:

- Johannes Angermuller (born 1973), professor and researcher
- Josef Angermüller (1949–1977), speedway rider
- Monique Angermüller (born 1984), former speed skater
- Rudolph Angermüller (1940–2021), musicologist
