= The Sharks (novel) =

1974 novel by Jens Bjørneboe

- First edition
- Author: Jens Bjørneboe
- Original title: Haiene
- Language: Norwegian
- Publisher: Gyldendal Norsk Forlag
- Publication date: 1974
- Publication place: Norway
- Media type: Print (hardcover and paperback)

The Sharks (Norwegian: Haiene) is a novel written by Norwegian author Jens Bjørneboe between 1973 and 1974 and originally published by Gyldendal Norsk Forlag in 1974. It is an allegorical sea story and was his last work. The external action takes place aboard the bark "Neptune," which is on its way from Manila to Marseille via Rio de Janeiro. The year is 1899, and it is also a voyage into the new century. The story is told through the voice of Norwegian "Peder Jensen," the ship's second mate, who resembles Bjørneboe himself. This book has a very strong symbolism; the ship is always pursued by sharks and on board, there are peoples of all nationalities. The ship is a symbol of the world, where the captain symbolizes those who have the power and the crew the oppressed. The sharks that pursue the ship symbolize the demons in man. The novel ends with a mutiny and a shipwreck, before the crew and officers are stranded on a deserted island where they live in peaceful anarchy before being picked up by a passing ship. The Sharks is considered one of Bjørneboe's most important novels and has been translated into multiple languages. Two years after its publication Bjørneboe committed suicide.

== Bibliography ==
- Jens Bjørneboe, The sharks: the history of a crew and a shipwreck, Norvik Press, 1992, ISBN 1870041208
- Jens Bjørneboe, Haiene: Historien om et mannskap og et forlis, Gyldendal Norsk Forlag, 1974, ISBN 82-05-06754-6
