= Peder Anker (historian) =

Norwegian historian

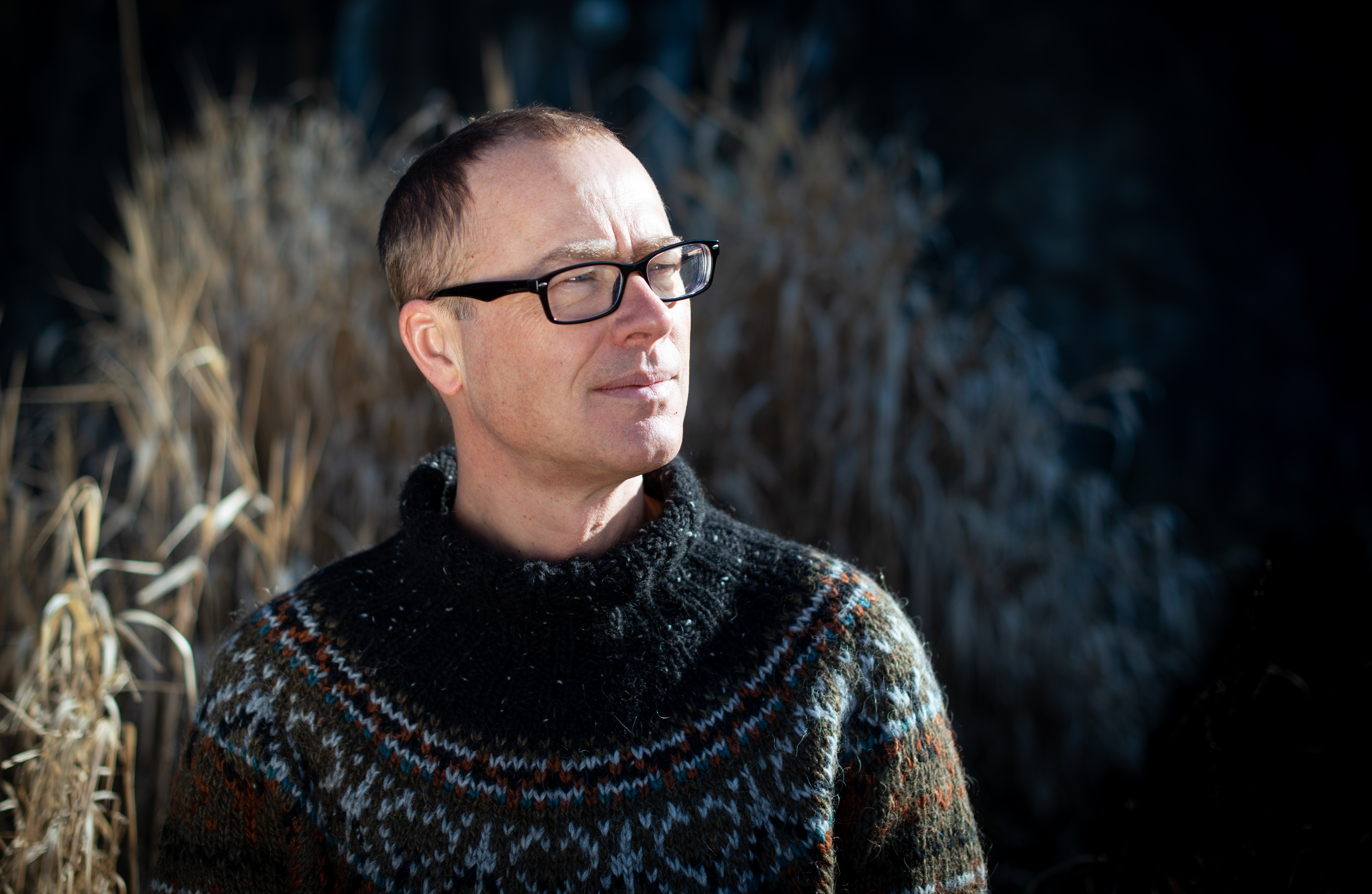
- Anker in 2022
- Born: Oslo, Norway
- Education: Harvard University, University of Oslo
- Known for: "The Power of the Periphery: How Norway Became an Environmental Pioneer for the World," Cambridge University Press, 2020.
- Scientific career
- Fields: History of Ecology, Environmental Science, Ecological Architecture and Design, Philosophy
- Website: pederanker.com

Peder Anker (pronounced /PAY-dur anchor/; born May 27, 1966, in Oslo, Norway) is a historian of environmental sciences, specializing in the history of ecology and ecological architecture and design. Anker is currently a Professor of History of Science at the Gallatin School of Individualized Study at New York University. Anker has received research fellowships from the Fulbright Program, the Dibner Institute and the Max Planck Institute for the History of Science, and been a visiting scholar at both Columbia University and University of Oslo.

He is the author of The Power of The Periphery: How Norway Became an Environmental Pioneer for the World (Cambridge University Press, 2020). This interdisciplinary book explores the history of environmental sciences in Norway from the publishing of Rachel Carson’s Silent Spring until the Rio Conference in 1992. He is also the author of From Bauhaus to Eco-House: A History of Ecological Design (2010) and Imperial Ecology: Environmental Order in the British Empire, 1895-1945 (2001).

In 2022 he published a book in Norwegian, Livet er best ute: Friluftslivets Historie og filosofi (Kagge 2022). His latest book is For the Love of Bombs: The Trail of Nuclear Suffering (Anthem Press, 2025).

== Early life ==
Peder Anker was born in Oslo, Norway. His mother, Bodil Borchsenius Anker, was a high-school teacher and researcher of pedagogy at the University of Oslo, while his father, Erik Anker, was a partner at the architectural office Anker & Hølaas. Peder attended Oslo Waldorf School and Persbraaten High School, both in Oslo. His older brother Espen Anker is a practicing psychiatrist while his younger sister Hedevig Anker is an artist. Peder has two children, Lukas and Theo.

Anker earned a B.A. in Environmental Philosophy in 1991 from the University of Oslo, a M.A. in Philosophy in 1993 from the University of Oslo, a M.A. in History of Science in 1998 from Harvard University, and a Ph.D. in History of Science in 1999 from Harvard University.

== Career ==
Anker started his academic career at the University of Oslo, where he was a lecturer at the Department of Philosophy from 1993 to 1994. After receiving his Ph.D., he became a research fellow at the Department of Philosophy at the University of Oslo in 2000. He then taught at Harvard University, in the Department of History of Science from 2000 to 2001. During this time, he published his first book, Imperial Ecology: Environmental Order in the British Empire, 1895-1945. From here, he conducted Postdoctoral Research at the Center for Development and Environment at the University of Oslo until 2006. From 2006 to 2009, he continued at the University of Oslo where he was a research fellow for the Forum for the University History. Anker is currently a professor at The Gallatin School of Individualized Study at New York University. While working at The Gallatin School of Individualized Study, he co-founded GLOBAL Design NYU, and is currently working as GDNYU Director along with Mitchell Joachim. While at New York University, he published From Bauhaus to Ecohouse: A History of Ecological Design and The Power of The Periphery. For his work in environmentalism, Anker was interviewed by Adam Curtis for a BBC TV Documentary, “How the ‘ecosystem’ myth has been used for sinister means." In 1995-1999, Anker participated in the Fulbright-Hays Fellowship Program, Bertram and Barbara Cohn Fellowship at Harvard University, and was a Dibner Institute Graduate Fellow at the Massachusetts Institute of Technology.

== Selected works ==
- For the Love of Bombs: The Trail of Nuclear Suffering (Anthem 2025)
- Livet er best ute: Friluftslivets Historie og filosofi (Kagge 2022)
- “Cycles and circulation: a theme in the history of biology and medicine“, with Nick Hopwood et.al., History and Philosophy of the Life Sciences 43:89 (2021), 1-39.
- “Deep Impact: Animal-, Plant- or Insect-Aided Design as techniques to mitigate stress on urban non-human species,” Terreform ONE, Mitchel Joachim, Peder Anker, Nicholas Gervasi, Topos Magazine, 112 (Sept. 2020), 32-37.
- The Power of the Periphery: How Norway Became an Environmental Pioneer for the World, Cambridge University Press, 2020.
- “Computing Environmental Design,” Computer Architectures: Constructing the Common Ground, 1945-1980, Theodora Vardouli and Olga Touloumi (eds.), (London: Routledge, 2019), 15-34.
- “Anthropocene Architecture: Design Earth’s Geostories” with Nina Edwards Anker, The Avery Review 29 (Feb. 2018).
- Republished in: Rania Ghosn and El Hadi Jazairy, Geostories: Another Architecture for the Environment, (Barcelona: Actar, 2018), 206-213.
- “A pioneer country? A history of Norwegian climate politics” Climatic Change, (Online March 2016), 1-13. Journal edition 151:1 (2018), 29-41.
- Global Design: Elsewhere Envisioned, with Mitchell Joachim and Louise Harpman. (Munich: Prestel, 2014).
- “The Call for a New Ecotheology in Norway,” Journal for the Study of Religion, Nature and Culture 7:2 (2013), 187–207.
- “Ecological Communication at the Oxford Imperial Forestry Institute,” in Cultivating the Colonies: Colonial States and their Environmental Legacies, Christina Folke Ax (et.a.) (ed.) Ohio University Press, 2011.
- “Viewing the Earth from Without or from Within” with Nina Edwards Anker, New Geographies 4 (2011), 89–94.
- From Bauhaus to Eco-House: A History of Ecological Design (Louisiana State University Press 2010).
- "Seeing Pink: The Eco-Art of Simon Starling," Journal of Visual Art Practice 7 (2008), 3–9.
- "Deep Ecology in Bucharest," Trumpeter 24 (2008), 56–58.
- "Science as a Vacation: A History of Ecology in Norway," History of Science, 45:4 (2007), 455–479.
- "Buckminster Fuller as Captain of Spaceship Earth," Minerva, 45:4 (2007), 417–434.
- "Graphic Language: Herbert Bayer’s Environmental Design," Environmental History, 12:2 (2007), 254–279.
- "The Closed World of Ecological Architecture," The Journal of Architecture, 10:5 (2005), 527–552.
- "The Bauhaus of Nature," Modernism/Modernity, 12:2 (2005), 229–251.
- "The Ecological Colonization of Space," Environmental History, 10:2 (2005), 239–268.
- "A Vindication of the Rights of Brutes," Philosophy and Geography, 7:2 (2004), 261–266.
- "The Economy of Nature in the Botany of Nehemiah Grew," Archives of Natural History, 31:2 (2004), 191–207.
- "The Politics of Ecology in South Africa on the Radical Left," Journal of the History of Biology, 37:2 (2004), 303–331.
- "The Philosopher’s Cabin and the Household of Nature," Ethics, Place and Environment, 6:2 (2003), 131–141.
- "The Context of Ecosystem Theory," Ecosystems, 5:7 (2002), 611–613.
- Imperial Ecology: Environmental Order in the British Empire, 1895-1945 (Harvard University Press, 2001).
- "The Dream of the Biocentric community and the Structure of Utopias," with Nina Witoszek, Worldviews, 2 (1998), 239–256.

== Accolades ==
- New York State Council on the Arts Design Award (with Nina Edwards), 2003.
- Forum for History of Human Science, Dissertation Prize, 2000.
- Harvard University Certificate of Distinction in Teaching, Derek Bok Center, 1997.
