= Henny Moan =

Norwegian actress (1936–2024)

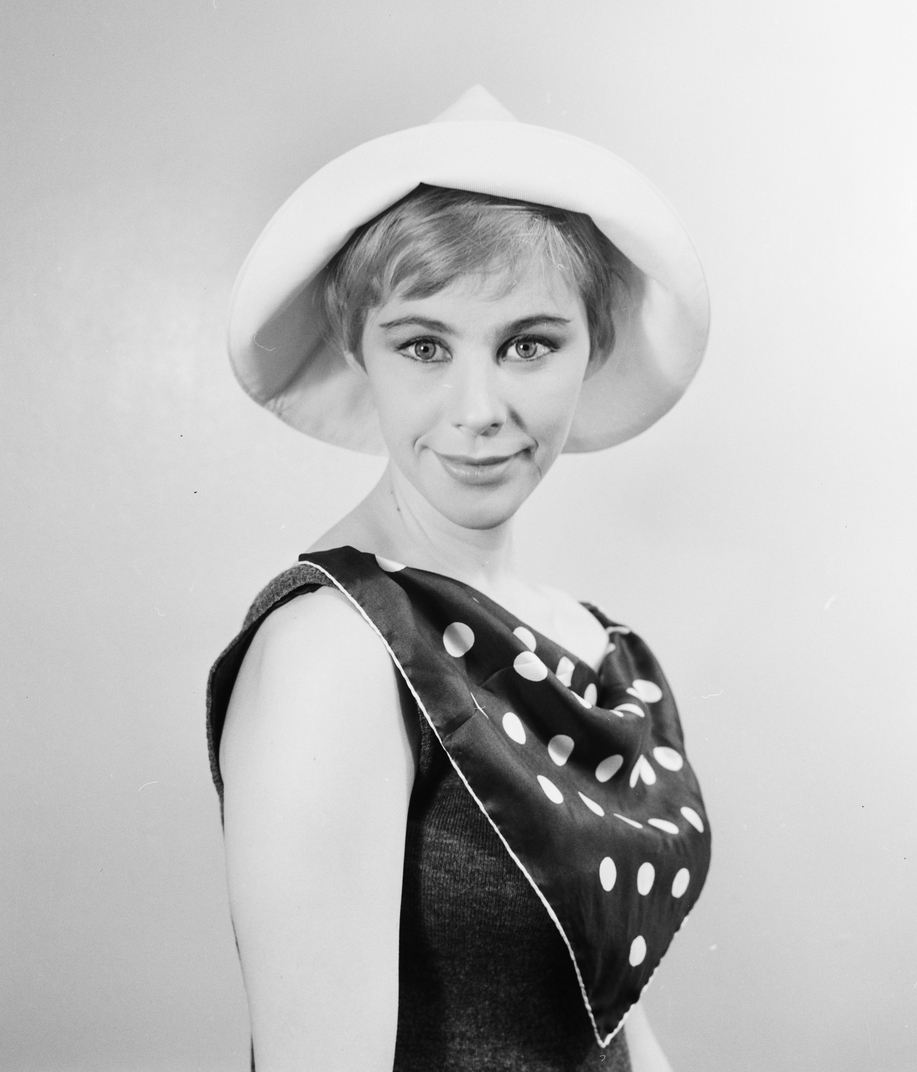
- Moan in 1958
- Born: Henny Elisabeth Moan; 22 February 1936; Talvik, Norway
- Died: 8 September 2024 (aged 88)
- Occupation: Actress
- Years active: 1955–2017
- Spouse: André Bjerke (m. 1959–1972)
- Partner: Ole Paus (1973–1976)
- Awards: Amanda honorary award (2010); Order of St. Olav (2020)

Member of the Bærum Municipal Council
- In office 1972–1975

Personal details
- Party: Labour

Henny Elisabeth Moan (22 February 1936 – 8 September 2024) was a Norwegian actress. She had a long career in theatre, but is best known for her roles in certain classics of Norwegian cinema, such as the Oscar-nominated Nine Lives (1957) and Lake of the Dead (1958). Moan was married to the author André Bjerke and later lived with singer Ole Paus.

== Biography ==
Born in Alta in Finnmark on 22 February 1936, Moan grew up in Gratangen and Narvik. At the age of 17 she left her home in Northern Norway – where she worked at a gas station – without telling anyone where she was going. She moved to Oslo where she applied to the Norwegian Theatre Academy. Here she was accepted in the first intake in the history of the school, in 1953.

Moan has always been characterised by her short-cropped hair, a style she came up with in 1954, at a time when this was still quite uncommon for girls. She claimed she originally did it because it was convenient, and because she had worn her hair like that as a child, to avoid lice and to make the hair grow out thicker.

From 1959 to 1972 Moan was married to celebrated Norwegian author André Bjerke. In 1960, they had a daughter, Vilde, who later wrote a book about her childhood. Henny and André lived together until their daughter was nine, at which point they separated. She lived with singer and songwriter Ole Paus from 1973 to 1976, and had one son with him.

She resided in Bærum, having first bought a house there in 1963. Moan died on 8 September 2024, at the age of 88.

== Career ==
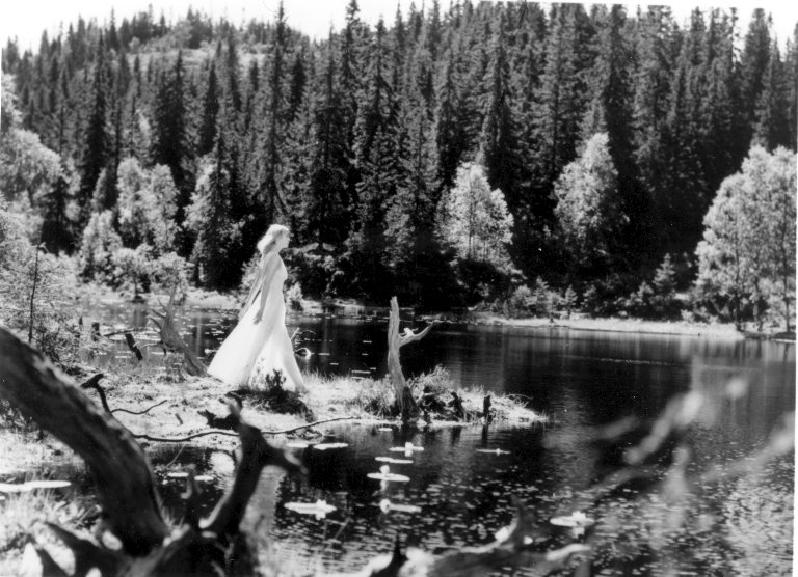
Henny Moan in a famous scene from the movie Lake of the Dead (1958)

Moan acted both at Det Norske Teatret (the Norwegian Theater), Oslo Nye Teater and at Nationaltheatret (the National Theatre), in roles such as "Marguerite" in Dumas's The Lady of the Camellias, and "Miss Julie" in Strindberg's play by that name. In 2006 she won the award "Aase Byes ærespris". She played her last part before retirement early in 2007. After retiring she started working on her autobiography.

She is also known for her work in movies, and had a role in the Oscar-nominated Nine Lives in 1957. This film was in 2005 named the best movie in the history of Norwegian film, by a jury of movie critics. After this she received offers from Hollywood, but decided to stay in Norway. While married to Bjerke, she took part in the adaptation of his novel Lake of the Dead. Here she appeared in what was to become an iconic scene of Norwegian cinema, where she walks in a white, translucent dress along a tarn in the forest. More recently she had a brief part in Bent Hamer's O' Horten.

On television she is known for her role in the 1978 science fiction series Blindpassasjer (Blind passengers), written by Tor Åge Bringsværd and Jon Bing. She played the part of "Edvarda" in a 1975 TV series based on Knut Hamsun's novels Benoni and Rosa. Moan also worked with television drama for several years.

She received the Amanda honorary award in 2010, and was decorated Commander of the Order of St. Olav in 2020.

== Select filmography ==
Year	Title	Role
1956	På solsiden	
1956	A Little Nest	Li
1957	Nine Lives	Agnes
1958	Lake of the Dead	Liljan Werner
1960	Omringet	Frimann's girlfriend
1962	Cold Tracks	Ragnhild
1964	Klokker i måneskinn	multiple roles
1967	Musikanter	Tora, the dentist's wife
1995	Kristin Lavransdatter	Ragnfrid
1997	Barbara	Magdalene
1998	Thranes metode	Thrane's mother
2007	O' Horten	Svea
