= Johannes Angermuller =

German academic

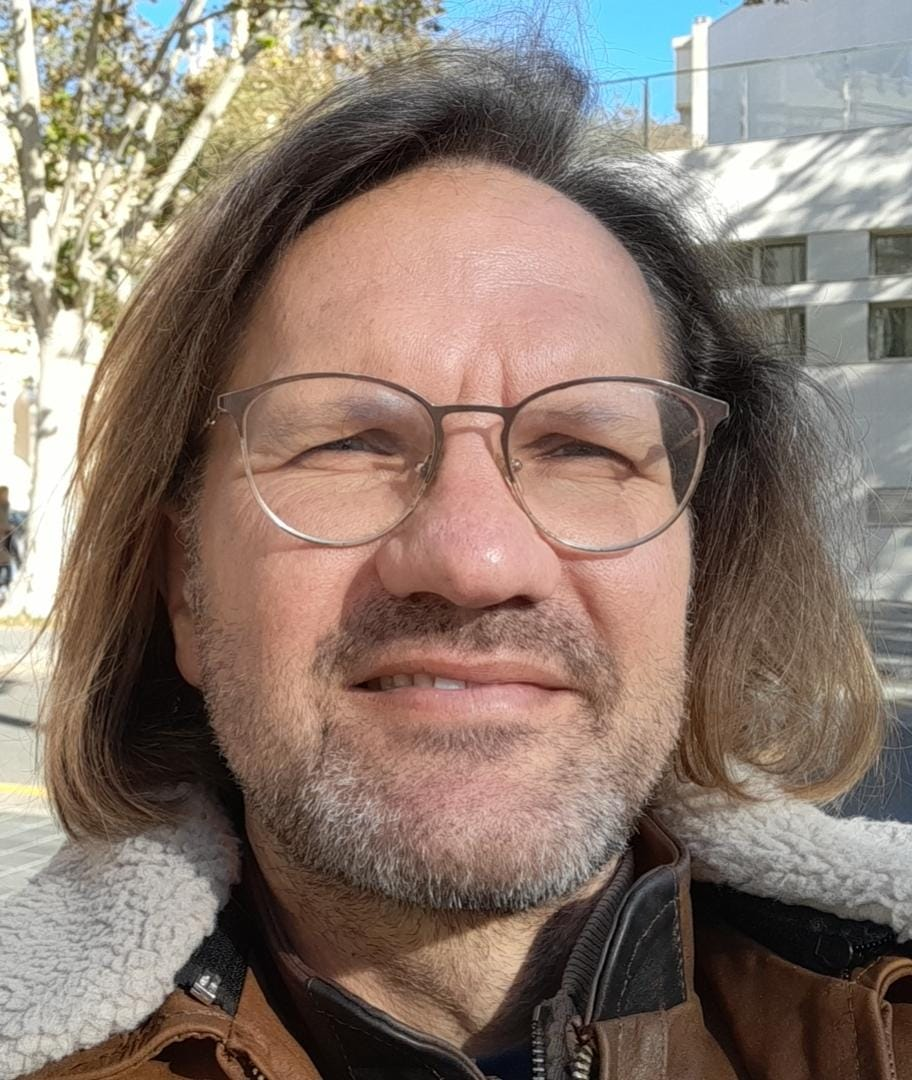
- Born: 1973 (age 52–53); Erlangen, West Germany
- Other name: Johannes Angermüller
- Awards: ERC Grantee

Academic work
- Main interests: Discourse studies, linguistics, sociology
- Notable works: Why There Is No Poststructuralism in France, Poststructuralist Discourse Analysis, The Discourse Studies Reader, Careers of the Professoriate

Johannes Angermuller (born 1973) is a discourse researcher in linguistics and sociology. He is professor at Open University.

== Biography ==
Angermuller grew up in Erlangen, a Franconian town in southern Germany. His parents are mathematicians but he became interested in questions of language when he discovered James Joyce. After time spent as a student at Duke University and St. Petersburg State University, he obtained a master's degree in sociology, Eastern European history and American Studies from Erlangen-Nuremberg University. At Duke he encountered Fred Jameson, who aroused his passion for (French) Theory. While doing his PhD, he began to live in Paris (France), where Dominique Maingueneau introduced him to discourse analysis. From 1999 to 2009, he was a lecturer of sociology at Magdeburg University in eastern Germany. In 2003, he finished a binational PhD in (linguistic) discourse analysis (University of East Paris) and sociology (University of Magdeburg). From 2009 to 2012, he taught as a Professor (W1) of the Sociology of Higher Education at Mainz University (Germany). In 2012, he was appointed (Research) Professor of Discourse at the Centre for Applied Linguistics at Warwick, near Coventry (UK). Warwick University is in Coventry, between London and Birmingham (UK). He also joined the Centre d'Etude des Mouvements Sociaux at Ecole des Hautes Etudes en Sciences Sociales in Paris. His name then lost the umlaut but older publications are still signed "Angermüller". He has been at Open University (Milton Keynes, UK) as Professor of Discourse, Languages and Applied Linguistics since 2019. He lives between London, Paris and Valencia.

== Academic work ==
Having a background in linguistics and sociology, Angermuller is known for his work in Discourse Studies and poststructuralism. His research interests centre on the discursive construction of social order. His methodological focus is on the social effects of language in use. While addressing questions of power, knowledge and social change, he has pursued research on academic, educational as well as political discourses. Trained in German sociology, French linguistic discourse analysis and the qualitative traditions of German and North American social sciences, he specialises in enunciative pragmatics as a linguistic approach to subjectivity in language. In his studies of academic and political discourses, he perceives discourse as a positioning practice contributing to the construction of social order. He was the Principal Investigator of the ERC DISCONEX and INTAC research teams investigating the positioning practices and cultures of researchers in the social sciences and humanities in the U.S., France, Germany and the UK. Angermuller coordinates DiscourseNet, an interdisciplinary and international network of discourse researchers, which became "DiscourseNet. International Association for Discourse Studies" in 2019 and elected Angermuller as its founding president. With Daniel Wrana, he set up the multilingual Web portal Discourseanalysis.net. With Martin Nonhoff, he launched the Gradnet graduate conferences at Erlangen in 1999. He is the editor of the Palgrave DiscourseNet Publication hub, which includes a number of journals and book series, such as Palgrave Communications and the Palgrave Book Series Postdisciplinary Studies in Discourse; the transcript DiscourseNet book series; Peter Lang: Transpects.

== Publications ==
Angermuller, Johannes (2023) (with Philippe Blanchard): Careers of the Professoriate. Academic pathways of the linguists and sociologists in Germany, France and the UK. London: Palgrave. ISBN 978-3-031-25241-9

Angermuller, Johannes (2014): Poststructuralist Discourse Analysis. Subjectivity in Enunciative Pragmatics. Houndmills, Basingstoke: Palgrave Macmillan, ISBN 978-1-137-44246-8 [French version: Analyse du discours poststructuraliste. Les voix du sujet dans le language chez Lacan, Althusser, Foucault, Derrida et Sollers. Limoges: Lambert Lucas, 2013, ISBN 978-2-35935-076-0; Portuguese version: Análise de discurso pós-estruturalista. As vozes do sujeito na linguagem em Lacan, Althusser, Foucault, Derrida e Sollers. Campinas: Pontes, 2016, ISBN 978-8-571-13734-9].

Angermuller, Johannes (2015): Why There Is No Poststructuralism in France. The Making of an Intellectual Generation. London: Bloomsbury, ISBN 978-1474226325 [short version in French: Le Champ de la Théorie. Essor et déclin du structuralisme en France. Paris: Hermann, 2013, ISBN 978-2-705-68349-8; Turkish version: Neden Fransa'da Postyapisalcilik Yok. Ankara: Heretik Basin Yayin, 2017, ISBN 9786059436113; Spanish version: ¿Quién dijo posestructuralismo? La creación de una generación intelectual. Madrid: Dado, 2019, ISBN 978-84-948922-4-0].

Angermuller, Johannes / Maingueneau, Dominique/ Wodak, Ruth (eds) (2014): The Discourse Studies Reader. Main Currents in Theory and Analysis. Amsterdam, Philadelphia: John Benjamins, ISBN 978-9-027-21211-5, 417 pages.

Angermuller, Johannes/ Nonhoff, Martin/ Herschinger, Eva/ Macgilchrist, Felicitas/ Reisigl, Martin/ Wedl, Juliette/ Wrana, Daniel/ Ziem, Alexander (eds) (2014): Diskursforschung. Ein interdisziplinäres Handbuch. Band I: Theorien, Methodologien und Kontroversen. Band II: Methoden und Analysepraxis. Perspektiven auf Hochschulreformdiskurse. [Discourse Studies. An Interdisciplinary Handbook. Vol. I: Theories, Methodologies and Controversies. Vol. II: Methods and analytical practice. Studying discourses of higher education reforms.] Bielefeld: transcript, ISBN 978-3-8376-2722-0, 1250 pages.

Wrana, Daniel / Ziem, Alexander / Reisigl, Martin / Nonhoff, Martin / Angermuller, Johannes (eds) (2014): DiskursNetz. Wörterbuch der interdisziplinären Diskursforschung. [DiscourseNet. Dictionary of Interdisciplinary Discourse Studies]. Berlin: Suhrkamp, ISBN 978-3-518-29697-4, 560 pages.

Angermuller, Johannes/ Philippe, Gilles (eds) (2015): Analyse du discours et dispositifs d'énonciation. Autour des travaux de Dominique Maingueneau, Limoges: Lambert-Lucas, ISBN 978-2-35935-137-8, 310 pages.
