= Lake of the Dead =

1958 Norwegian mystery horror film

Lake of the Dead De dødes tjern
- Norwegian theatrical release poster
- Directed by: Kåre Bergstrøm
- Written by: André Bjerke; Kåre Bergstrøm
- Starring: Henny Moan; Henki Kolstad; André Bjerke
- Narrated by: Kåre Bergman
- Cinematography: Ragnar Sørensen
- Edited by: Olav Engebretsen
- Music by: Gunnar Sønstevold
- Production company: Norsk Film
- Distributed by: Norsk Film
- Release date: December 17, 1958
- Running time: 76 minutes
- Country: Norway
- Language: Norwegian

Lake of the Dead (Norwegian title: De dødes tjern, also known as Lake of the Damned) is a 1958 Norwegian mystery horror film directed by Kåre Bergstrøm, and based on the 1942 novel by André Bjerke (as Bernhard Borge). The film stars Henki Kolstad, Henny Moan and Georg Richter. In 2019, a remake named Lake of Death was released written and directed by Nini Bull Robsahm.

== Plot ==
The film takes place between the 20th and 23rd of August 1958. Crime author Bernhard Borge and his wife Sonja, psychoanalyst Kai Bugge, magazine editor Gabriel Mørk, lawyer Harald Gran and his fiancée Liljan Werner, all Oslo residents, plan to visit Liljan's brother Bjørn in his cabin deep in the Østerdal forests. But when the guests arrive, Werner is missing and his dog is found dead at a lake nearby. It's not long before they begin to ponder the old legend associated with the place: a man in an incestuous relationship with his sister is said to have killed her and her lover, then drowned himself in the lake. The legend also holds that anyone who stays in the cabin, formerly the murderer's, would be possessed by a strange attraction: they would be forced to drown themselves in the lake. The company decides to solve the mystery, but soon it appears that they are exposed to the mysterious powers that are tied to the lake.

== Cast ==
- André Bjerke as Gabriel Mørk
- Bjørg Engh as Sonja, Bernhard's wife
- Henki Kolstad as Bernhard Borge, crime writer
- Per Lillo-Stenberg as Bjørn Werner, Liljans brother
- Erling Lindahl as Kai Bugge, psychologist
- Henny Moan as Liljan Werner
- Øyvind Øyen as Bråten, policeman
- Georg Richter as Harald Gran
- Leif Sommerstad as Tore Gruvik, the ghost
- Inger Teien as Eva, Bjørn's girlfriend

== Production ==
De dødes tjern was co-written and directed by Kåre Bergstrøm. The film itself is an adaption of Andre Bjerke’s 1942 novel of the same name.

== Critical response ==
De dødes tjern remains relatively obscure outside its home country. Reviews of the film have been mostly positive, with critics praising the film's atmosphere, cinematography and soundtrack. Author Barry Atkinson praised the film, stating that it "benefits from eerie location work and Gunnar Sønstevold's ominous score."

== Legacy ==
The success of De dødes tjern was a turning point in Norwegian cinema, becoming director Bergstrøm's breakthrough film. It was later nominated as the fourth-best film of all time in Norway in a survey developed by Dagbladet in 1998 in which 101 movie critics gave points to Norwegian movies.
