= History of Bestiality =

Novel trilogy by Jens Bjørneboe

The History of Bestiality
- Cover of the first book in the trilogy, Moment of Freedom
- Moment of Freedom; Powderhouse; The Silence
- Author: Jens Bjørneboe
- Country: Norway
- Language: Norwegian
- Published: 1966–1973 (initial publication)
- No. of books: 3

The History of Bestiality is a trilogy by the Norwegian writer Jens Bjørneboe. It consists of the three books Moment of Freedom ("Frihetens øyeblikk", 1966), Powderhouse ("Kruttårnet", 1969) and The Silence ("Stillheten", 1973).

== Moment of Freedom ==
Moment of Freedom: the Heiligenberg Manuscript.

The narrator is a court usher in a small alp village ("Heiligenberg"). While observing incidents in the court, he occupies himself filling protocols with what he calls "the history of bestiality".

== Powderhouse ==
Powderhouse: Scientific Postscript and Last Protocol.

The narrator is now houseporter at a hospital for mentally diseased. The staff and patients deliver lectures on themes such as the history of execution, heresy and heretics.

== The Silence ==
The Silence: Anti-novel and Absolutely Very Last Protocol.

The narrator is situated in an unnamed country in northern Africa. He is now occupied with themes such as the history of colonisation: how the European countries took "possession" of large parts of the world, America, Africa and Asia.
