= Jens Bjørneboe =

Norwegian writer (1920–1976)

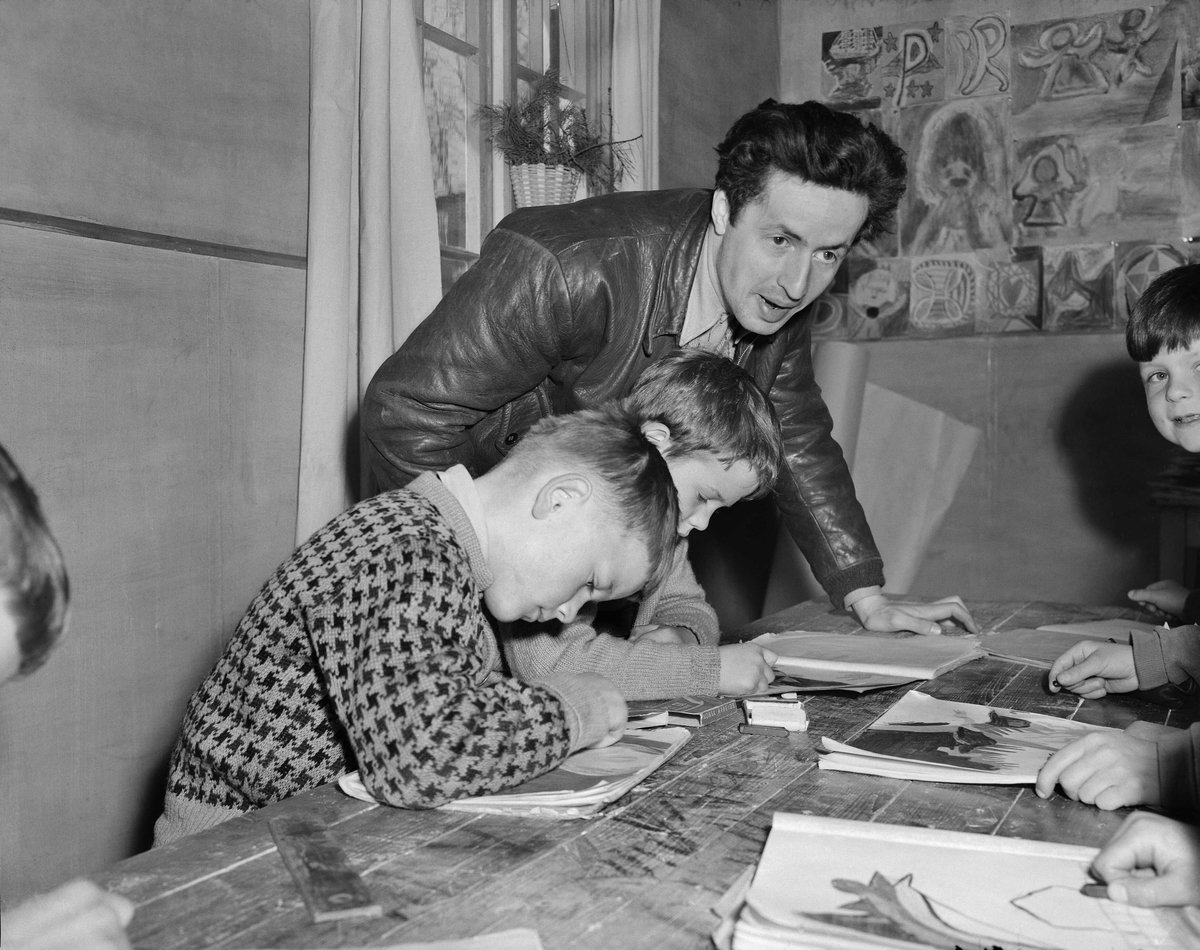
- Born: 9 October 1920; Kristiansand, Norway
- Died: 9 May 1976 (aged 55); Veierland, Nøtterøy, Norway
- Occupations: Author, Waldorf school teacher
- Children: Therese Bjørneboe
- Relatives: Ejlert Bjerke (uncle); André Bjerke (cousin); Dag Solstad (son-in-law); Vilhelm Tveteraas (father-in-law); Signe Hofgaard (mother-in-law); Sven Kærup Bjørneboe (nephew)
- Writing career
- Period: 1951–1976

Jens Ingvald Bjørneboe (9 October 1920 – 9 May 1976) was a Norwegian writer whose work spanned a number of literary formats. He was also a painter and a Waldorf school teacher. Bjørneboe was a harsh and eloquent critic of Norwegian society and Western civilization as a whole. He led a turbulent life and his uncompromising opinions cost him both an obscenity conviction as well as long periods of heavy drinking and bouts of depression, which in the end led to his suicide.

Jens Bjørneboe's first published work was Poems (Dikt) in 1951. He is widely considered to be one of Norway's most important post-war authors. Bjørneboe identified himself, among other self-definitions, as an anarcho-nihilist.

During the Norwegian language conflict, Bjørneboe was a notable proponent of the Riksmål language, together with his equally famous cousin André Bjerke.

== Early life ==
Jens Bjørneboe was born in 1920, in Kristiansand to Ingvald and Anna Marie Bjørneboe. He grew up in a wealthy family, his father a shipping magnate and a consul for Belgium. The Bjørneboe family originally immigrated from Germany in the 17th century and later adopted their Norwegian name. Coming from a long line of marine officers, Bjørneboe also went to sea as a young man.

Bjørneboe had a troubled childhood with sickness and depressions. He was bedbound for several years following severe pneumonia. At thirteen he attempted suicide by hanging himself. He began drinking when he was twelve, and he would often consume large amounts of wine when his parents were away. It is also rumored that he drank his father's aftershave on several occasions.

In 1943 Bjørneboe fled to Sweden to avoid forced labor under the Nazi occupation. During this exile, he met the German Jewish painter Lisel Funk, who later became his first wife. Lisel Funk introduced him to many aspects of German culture, especially German literature and the arts.

In the late 1960s and early 1970s, Bjørneboe reinvigorated the Norwegian anarchist movement with essays such as "Anarkismen som fremtid" ("Anarchism as Future") and "Anarkismen ... i dag?" ("Anarchism ... Today?").

== Death and legacy ==
After having struggled with depression and alcoholism for a long time, he committed suicide by hanging on the island of Veierland in Nøtterøy Municipality on 9 May 1976.

In his obituary in Aftenposten, Bjørneboe's life and legacy were described as follows:

For 25 years Jens Bjørneboe was a center of unrest in Norwegian cultural life: Passionately concerned with contemporary problems in nearly all their aspects, controversial and with the courage to be so, with a conscious will to carry things to extremes. He was not to be pigeonholed. He dropped in on many philosophical and political movements, but couldn't settle down in any of them. He was a wanderer, always traveling on in search of what was for him the truth—and he was a free man, in that he always ruthlessly followed his innermost intentions. Perhaps he could say, like Søren Kierkegaard, that "subjectivity is truth," for he knew no other guide than his personal conviction and his own impulses—but he related not merely to himself; his deepest concern was society and the person in society. His subjective grasp always involved the totality.

== Bibliography ==
=== Novels ===
- Ere the Cock Crows (Før hanen galer, 1952)
- Jonas (1955)
- Under a Harsher Sky (Under en hårdere himmel, 1957)
- Winter in Bellapalma (Vinter i Bellapalma, 1958)
- Little Boy Blue (Blåmann, 1959)
- The Evil Shepherd (Den onde hyrde, 1960)
- The Dream and the Wheel (Drømmen og hjulet, 1964), about author Ragnhild Jølsen
- Moment of Freedom (Frihetens øyeblikk, 1966) (translated by Esther Greenleaf Mürer, Norvik Press / Dufour, 1999)
- Without a Stitch (Uten en tråd, 1966)
- Powderhouse (Kruttårnet, 1969) (translated by Esther Greenleaf Mürer, Norvik Press / Dufour, 2000)
- Duke Hans (Hertug Hans, 1972)
- The Silence (Stillheten, 1973) (translated by Esther Greenleaf Mürer, Norvik Press / Dufour, 2000)
- The Sharks (Haiene, 1974) (translated by Esther Greenleaf Mürer, Norvik Press / Dufour, 1992)

=== Plays ===
- Many Happy Returns (Til lykke med dagen, 1965)
- The Bird Lovers (Fugleelskerne, 1966) (translated by Frederick Wasser, Sun&Moon Press, 1994)
- Semmelweis (1968) (translated by Joe Martin, Sun&Moon Press, 1999)
- Amputation (Amputasjon, 1970). Reprinted as: Amputations: Texts for an Extraordinary Spectacle (translated by Solrun Hoaas & Esther Greenleaf Mürer, Xenos Books, 2002)
- The Torgersen Case (Tilfellet Torgersen, 1972)
- Blue Jeans (Dongery, 1976)

=== Poem collections ===
- Poems (Dikt, 1951)
- Ariadne (1953)
- The Great City (Den store by, 1958)
- Happy Birthday (Til lykke med dagen, 1965)

=== Essay collections ===
- Norway, my Norway (Norge, mitt Norge, 1968)
- We Who Loved America (Vi som elsket Amerika, 1970)
- Police and Anarchy (Politi og anarki, 1972)
