= Therese Bjørneboe =

Norwegian theatre critic and editor

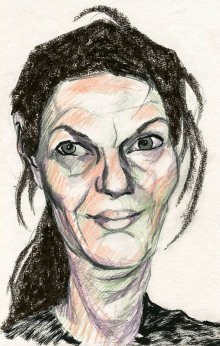
Therese Bjørneboe, drawing by Silje B. Hansen

Eva Therese Bjørneboe (born 1 March 1963) is a Norwegian theatre critic and editor. She writes for Aftenposten and is also editor of Norsk Shakespeare- og teatertidsskrift. She is a member of the jury of the International Ibsen Award.

From 1983 to 1985, she was editor of Rød Ungdom's magazine Rebell. She was culture editor of Klassekampen from 1994 to 1996. She holds a cand. philol. degree.

She is a daughter of Jens Bjørneboe and Tone Bjørneboe, and was married to Dag Solstad.

== Honours ==
- Honorary member, Norwegian Shakespeare Company (2014)
- Willy Brandt Prize (2011), awarded by German Foreign Minister Frank-Walter Steinmeier

== Publications ==
- Jens Bjørneboe. Utvalgte essays (Pax forlag, 1989). Editor.
- Jens Bjørneboe. Brev i utvalg (Pax forlag, 2006). Editor with Tore Rem.
