= Ejlert Bjerke =

Norwegian novelist, poet, playwright and essayist (1887–1963)

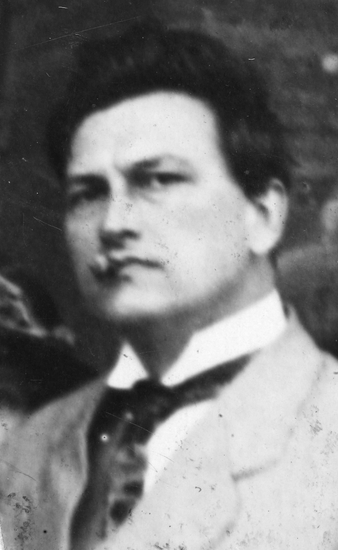
- Ejlert Bjerke, c. 1935
- Born: 14 March 1887
- Died: 25 September 1963 (aged 76)
- Occupations: Novelist, poet, playwright and essayist
- Children: André Bjerke

Ejlert Bjerke (14 March 1887 – 25 September 1963) was a Norwegian novelist, poet, playwright and essayist. He was born in Oslo, and made his literary debut in 1909 with the short story collection Mennesker og fauner. A second collection, Frie Fugle, was published in 1910. Among his novels are Livsfyrsten from 1914 and Sværmere i solen from 1917. His essay collection Molok was published in 1920, and the travelogue Tre horisonter in 1929. He was father of André Bjerke.
