= Agnete Bjørneboe =

Danish artist

Agnete Bjørneboe née Bayer (born 1943) is a Tanzanian-born Danish artist and educator whose work covers painting, collage, mosaic and papercutting. Her subjects are inspired by her upbringing in East Africa and by study trips to India, Syria and Egypt. For many years, she has taught art both in the classroom and with individual students. In addition to her artwork as a book illustrator, her creations can be seen in the Museum of Copenhagen.

== Biography ==
Born on 31 October 1943 in Moshi, Tanzania, Agnete Bayer was the daughter of the engineer Jørgen Nikolaj Bayer and Ulla Goldschmidt. On 5 July 1965, she married the educator Lars Bjørneboe. After completing her schooling in Kenya, she settled in Denmark in 1961 where she graduated in biology from the University of Copenhagen (1975) and attended Aarhus Art Academy in the early 1980s. Her art education also included study trips to India and Nepal (1987), Syria (1994), Cairo (1996), Rome and Peru (1998).

== Career ==
Bjørneboes artwork was influenced by her childhood in East Africa and by her later travels to India, Nepal and the Middle East. This led to the repeated geometric patterns she applied to her kilim rugs. The ornamental quality of her acrylic-coloured newspaper cuttings in the 1990s stems from India. As a painter, she has adopted a style similar to that of Hans Scherfig in her botanical and zoological subjects.

Active in Horsens, she has decorated local buildings including the hospital and several schools while teaching both school classes and individuals. First exhibiting at the autumn presentations at Den Frie Udstilling in 1978, she has since participated in both group and individual events. Her works can be seen in Copenhagen's City Museum, in the Arts and Crafts School in Vejle and in the Syren Park in Børkop.

Bjørneboes has also served for many years as a columnist for Dagbladet Børsen, writing on lifestyle, art, antiques and food.
