= Jonas (novel) =

Novel by Jens Bjørneboe

First edition

Jonas is a novel by Norwegian author Jens Bjørneboe, originally published in 1955 by Aschehoug. It is widely recognised as one of his most important works, and as one of the most significant Norwegian literary works of the post-war era. The novel has a complex narrative taken from several different environments from the 1920s Weimar Republic and the Nazi era to the 1950s Norwegian society.

The novel's title character, "Jonas," is a first grader in Norway, who early in the novel encounters a public school system that according to Bjørneboe is increasingly controlled by the "salamanders," a term used metaphorically for the bigoted enemies of culture which Bjørneboe sees in Norway at the time.

Jonas is usually interpreted as a harsh critique of the Norwegian public school system and the social democratic society of the 1950s, and has a warm portrayal of an alternative form of education, which is a thinly veiled reference to Waldorf education. At the time, Bjørneboe and his wife Lisel Bjørneboe both worked as Waldorf teachers in Oslo, and the central character "Johannes Marx" is inspired by Lisel. The novel however has a much broader focus than the education debate, Bjørneboe's intention was to portray the topic of humanity. To this end, he uses four main biographies, which are all ultimately linked, with a particular emphasis on the character of "Jonas."

In this novel, Bjørneboe articulates his often cited idea that Nazism, broadly construed to mean hostility to the idea of humanity, could manifest itself anywhere and any time, for example in Norway in the 1950s.

Bjørneboe, a proponent of the conservative Riksmål language (the traditional language of the educated elite of Norway), uses the radical Samnorsk language as an expression of the lack of culture of the salamanders.

== Bibliography ==
- Jens Bjørneboe, Jonas, Aschehoug, 1955

== Literature ==
- Tore Rem: Sin egen herre (Cappelen Damm, 2009)
