= André Bjerke =

Norwegian writer and poet (1918–1985)

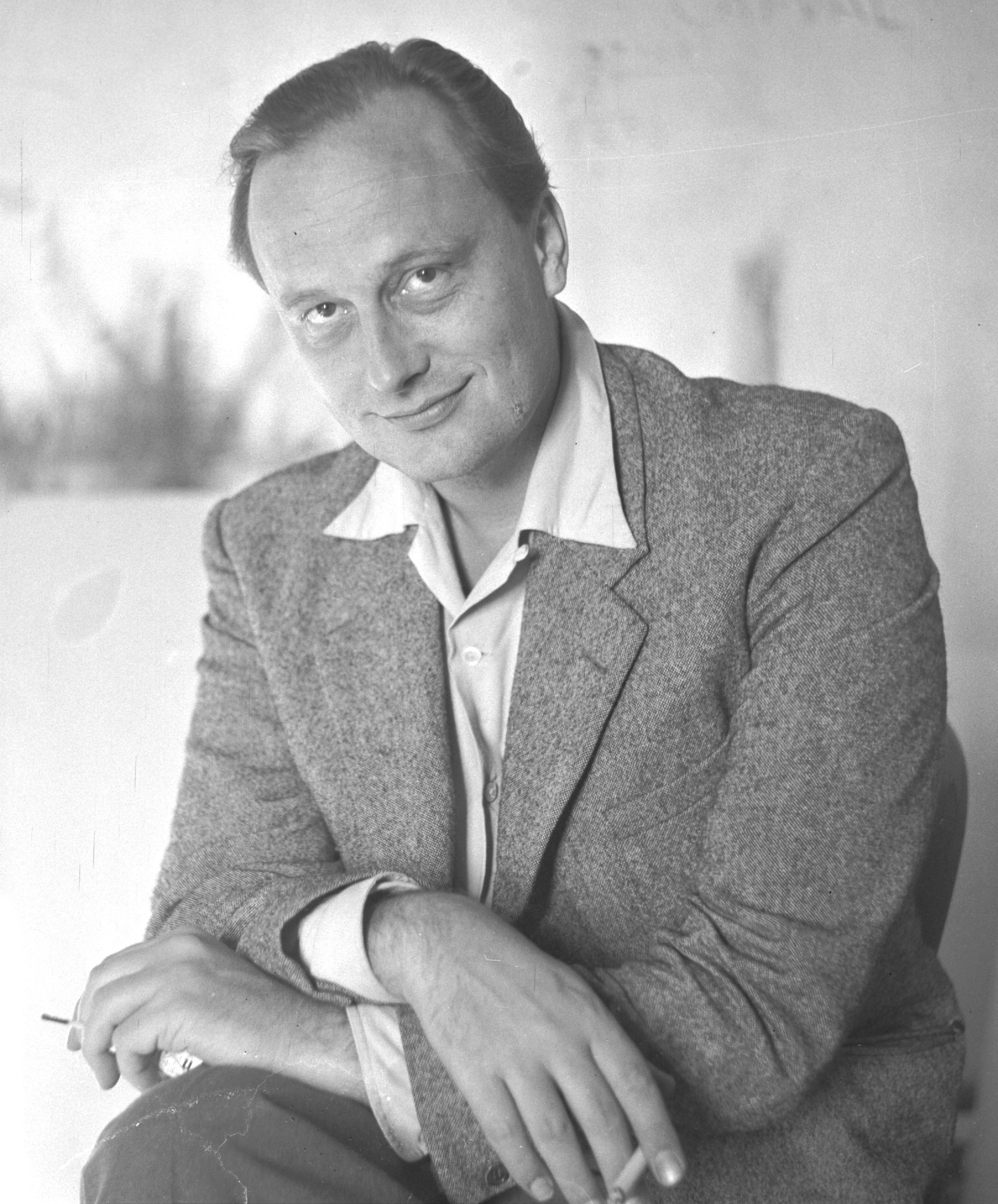
- Bjerke, 1958
- Born: Jarl André Bjerke; 30 January 1918; Aker
- Died: 10 January 1985 (aged 66); Oslo
- Resting place: Oslo
- Occupations: Poet, novelist
- Spouse(s): Mette Brun (1956–?); Henny Moan (1959–1972); Gerd Granholt (?–1985)
- Relatives: Ejlert Bjerke (father); Jens Bjørneboe (cousin)
- Writing career
- Pen name: Bernhard Borge
- Language: Norwegian
- Genres: Poetry, crime fiction, prose

Jarl André Bjerke (30 January 1918 – 10 January 1985) was a Norwegian writer and poet. He wrote a wide range of material: poems (both for children and adults), mystery novels (four of them under the pseudonym Bernhard Borge), essays, and articles. He translated works by Shakespeare, Molière, Goethe and Racine. Bjerke was known as a prominent proponent of the Riksmål language during the Norwegian language struggle, and of anthroposophy, especially in the 1950s and launched a magazine, Ordet, in the same period. Several of Bjerke's poems have been set to music by Marcus Paus.

== Background ==
Bjerke was born in Aker, Norway. His parents were the author Ejlert Bjerke and Karin (Svensson) Bjerke. He was the cousin of author Jens Bjørneboe (1920-1976). His debut was in 1940 with a collection of poems, Syngende Jord.

== Mystery novels and short stories ==
His mystery novels were influenced by his interest in psychoanalysis. His first mystery novel, Nattmennesket ("The Night Person") was published in 1941. In this novel he introduced the psychoanalyst Kai Bugge who claims that a psychologist is more able to solve a real crime than a police officer. After a particularly hideous murder, Bugge and police officer Hammer, join forces to solve the impossible mystery. Where Hammer looks for material clues and interviews the suspects about things like motive and alibis, Bugge makes an analytical approach. The author also used his pen-name of Bernhard Borge for a character who narrates the novels.

De dødes tjern ("The Lake of the Dead") from 1942 was made into a film in 1958, directed by Kåre Bergstrøm (1911–1976). This novel is also featured by Kai Bugge in opposition to literary critic, Gabriel Mørk and policeman, Harald Gran. The three accompanied by author Bernhard Borge, his wife and Gran's fiancée visit the scene of a suicide. The deceased had left a diary in which he revealed his growing obsession by the pond, which ends with a confession that he has no choice but to commit suicide by drowning himself. During the investigation it turns out that visitors are not immune to the forces that abode in the pond.

In 1947, he published Døde menn går i land ("Dead Men Come Ashore"). This is the only one of his full novels that does not star Kai Bugge, but the conflict between a traditional solver of mysteries and those who dabbles in paranormal phenomena is a central motif in the novel. Arne Krag-Andersen has bought a famously haunted house on the southern coast of Norway. There is a curse on the manor: Any one who tries to change anything whatsoever with the house or its contents, will die a violent death. American minister Pahle is deeply fascinated by satanism and claims that a satanic cult was connected to the house. A deserted Estonian ship found outside the shore adds to the atmosphere.

In 1950, Skjult Mønster ("Hidden Pattern") was published. Kai Bugge re-enters the scene, but even if he solves the strange mystery and sheds light on the hidden pattern, he plays no central role. Irene Cramer is scared to death, and it seems clearly that her fright is not only imagined. She moves in with four bachelors in an attempt to be protected, but even their chivalrous behavior doesn't give her the security she craves. The reader is led through a veritable maze with a pattern that seems impossible until the hidden pattern is revealed by Kai Bugge.

The short story collection Tryllestaven ("The Magic Wand") from 1961 does not really fit the description "mysteries". A few of them are, but most of them concerns other parts of life. You meet a young boy and his dreams, a girl solving the ultimate question for a scientist, a very distorted traditional Norwegian fairy tale, an underdog who finds his magic wand in shape of a walking cane, the challenge of writing soberly while sober and other stories.

In 1963 André Bjerke published Enhjørningen ("The Unicorn") under his own name. Enhjørningen consists of three novellas and a short story bound together by the challenge between psychology and the unicorn — representing the supernatural forces in existence. Dr. Kahrs denies the existence of any unicorn, and his three bridge-playing friends, author Nordberg, ad-man Bøhmer and journalist Strand, try to convince him by telling of their meeting with the unicorn.

Bjerke also published the short story collection, Hobby-detektiven ("The Hobby Detective") where the very unusual police officer, Klaus Vangli is the hero. Vangli has a very untraditional approach to the different mysteries he sets out to solve. He claims that his enormous range of hobbies gives him the necessary skills and knowledge to solve murders, thefts, fraud and a rather petty theft by a small child. His hobbies covers chess, astronomy, optics, philately, track and field, football betting and other interests that has seems to have nothing in common.

Bjerke also published two collections of mystery short stories in 1970, titled Onkel Oscar starter opp ("Uncle Oscar Starts Up") and Onkel Oscar kjører videre ("Uncle Oscar Drives On"). Oscar is a cab driver in contemporary Oslo who is mixed up in different crimes and solves them by his ability his acumen. The stories, co-written by TV host, Harald Tusberg, were adaptations from the manuscripts for the TV series about uncle Oscar.

== Non-literary achievements ==
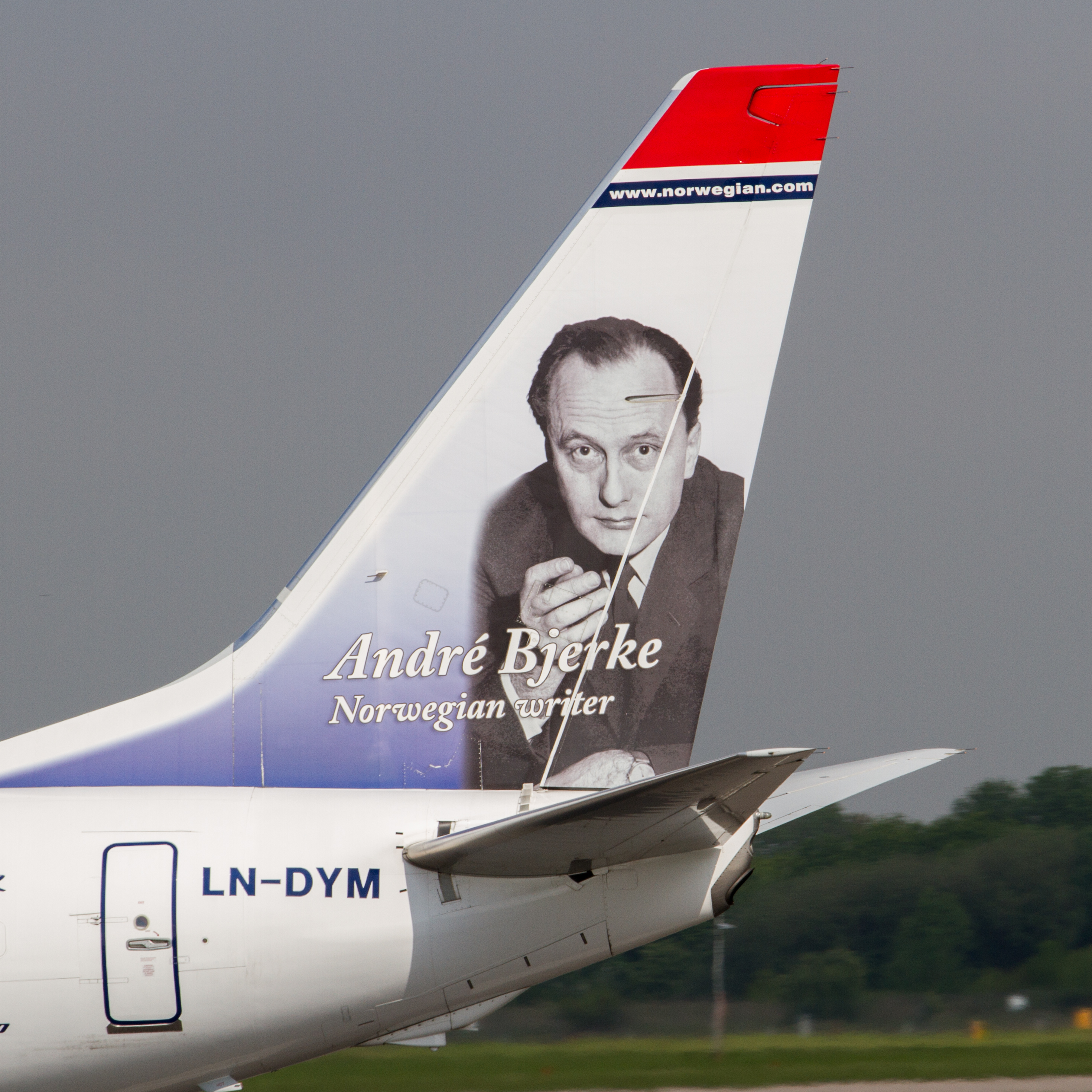
Norwegian Air Shuttle LN-DYM "Andre Bjerke"

Bjerke was the co-host of the television show NRK Streiftog i grenseland in 1973. This series of shows was the first dedicated to investigating paranormal and occult phenomena. Harald Tusberg was the other host. André Bjerke was a chess player and wrote several essays about the history and culture of chess.

== Personal life ==
Bjerke was married to the actress Henny Moan. Together they had a daughter, Vilde, who wrote a book about her father, Du visste om et land in 2002. After a debilitating stroke in 1981, he was reliant on a wheelchair for the rest of his life. In 1983, he was made a knight in the Order of St. Olav. He died during 1985 and was buried at Vestre gravlund in Oslo.

== Awards ==
- 1958 - Bastian Prize (Bastianprisen for oversettelsen)
- 1963 - Riksmal Association Literature Prize (Riksmålsforbundets litteraturpris)
- 1967 - Riksmal Association Radio Listeners Prize (Riksmålsforbundet: Lytterprisen)
- 1972 - Norwegian Association of Literary Translators (Norsk kulturråds oversetterpris)
- 1973 - Riverton Club Honorary Prize (Rivertonklubbens ærespris)
- 1980 - Oslo City Culture Award (Oslo bys kulturpris)

== Other sources ==
- Bjerke, Vilde (2002) Du visste om et land. Om min far André Bjerke (Oslo :Aschehoug) ISBN 9788203185366
- Hansen, Jan E. (1985) André Bjerke : det bevegelige menneske : et portrett (Oslo : Cappelen) ISBN 82-02-09259-0
- Parmann, Øistein (1982) André Bjerke i lek og alvor (Oslo :Grøndahl og Dreyer) ISBN 9788209100202

Awards
Preceded by Peter Magnus	Recipient of the Bastian Prize; 1958	Succeeded by Odd Bang-Hansen
