= Barbara Cohn =

American epidemiologist

Barbara A. Cohn
- Born: Barbara Adler Cohn
- Education: University of California, Berkeley
- Scientific career
- Fields: Epidemiology, Child health
- Workplaces: Child Health and Development Studies, Public Health Institute
- Thesis: Behavioral factors and HDL-cholesterol in female twins : a multivariate analysis (1984)
- Academic advisors: Mary Claire King

Barbara A. Cohn is an American epidemiologist and the Director of Child Health and Development Studies, a program of the Public Health Institute in Oakland, California. She is best known for her work in child health and development.

== Education ==
Cohn received her bachelor's degree in zoology at the University of California, Berkeley after transferring from University of Michigan. She stayed at UC Berkeley to complete her Master of Public Health and Masters of City and Regional Planning in 1975, and went on to receive her PhD in epidemiology in 1984.

== Research ==
Cohn became co-director of the Child Health and Development Studies (CHDS) at the Public Health Institute in 1997 and became its director in 2001. The CHDS was founded with a commitment to research and understand how health and disease are passed on from one generation to the next, taking into account biological, environmental, and social factors. Cohn maintains an active research program with a focus on how environmental chemicals affect reproductive health, how exposure to certain chemicals in the womb can affect a child's risk of disease, and how pregnancy protects women from developing breast cancer.

Her group has found that prenatal exposure to DDT—an insecticide that became infamous for its negative environmental impacts after Rachel Carson's 1962 book Silent Spring—is linked to increase risk of breast cancer. The chemical was banned from use in the United States in 1972, and has since been banned in several other countries, because of well-documented health concerns. Nevertheless, the study found that women who had been exposed to DDT in utero more than 50 years ago had a fourfold increased risk of breast cancer than women exposed to lower levels. The study focused on assessing the risk of breast cancer among a cohort of 9,300 women born in the United States between 1959 and 1967—a period when DDT use was common in the country.

Cohn also led the team that uncovered several pregnancy complications that can increase the long-term risk of death from cardiovascular disease. While previous studies have linked different complications to subsequent cardiovascular disease risk, this work was unique in that Cohn and her co-investigator Piera M. Cirillo examined how these different pregnancy complications can come together in different combinations to modulate that risk. They used data from CDHS collected over five decades.

== Awards and honors ==
- Community Breast Canter Research Award, Zero Breast Cancer, 2015
