= Dominique Maingueneau =

French linguist

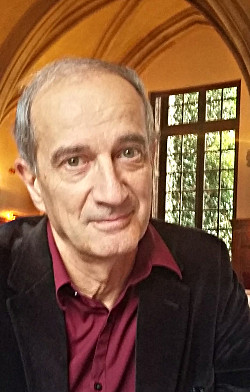
- in 2016
- Born: 1950 (age 75–76); Paris
- Education: Ecole Normale Supérieure (Saint-Cloud), Paris Nanterre University
- Occupations: Linguist, Discourse Analyst
- Notable work: Genèses du discours (1984), Féminin fatal (1999, Le Discours littéraire (2004), Discours et analyse du discours (2014).

Dominique Maingueneau (born 1950) is a French linguist, emeritus Professor at Sorbonne University (Paris). His research focuses on discourse analysis. It associates a pragmatic outlook on discourse with linguistic «enunciation» theories and some aspects of Michel Foucault's line of thought.

== Biography ==
Maingueneau studied linguistics and philosophy at the "École Normale Supérieure de Saint-Cloud" (1970-1974) and at the University of Paris 10 (now Paris Nanterre University). He obtained in 1974 a first PhD ("doctorat de 3° cycle") in linguistics: Building a discursive semantics; he was awarded a second one ("doctorat d’État") in 1979: Semantics of controversy. From discourse to interdiscourse. He became lecturer at the University of Amiens (1974), then professor (1988). In 2000 he moved to the University of Paris XII; from 2012 to 2019 he was professor of French linguistics and discourse analysis at the Sorbonne. He was a member of the Institut Universitaire de France (2006-2011)..... His books have been translated into thirteen languages.

== Research ==
He has published on French linguistics, and above all on discourse analysis. In the latter area he has written various handbooks: Initiation aux méthodes de l’analyse du discours (1976), Nouvelles tendances en analyse du discours (1987), Analyser les textes de communication (1998), Discours et analyse du discours (2014). He was also the co-editor, with P. Charaudeau, of the Dictionnaire d’analyse du discours (2002). With J. Angermuller and R. Wodak he edited The Reader in Discourse Studies: Main currents in Theory and Analysis (2014).

In his view, discourse analysis is only one of the disciplines belonging to discourse studies. Each of these disciplines (rhetoric, sociolinguistics, discourse analysis, conversation analysis, etc.) is based on a specific interest. The interest of discourse analysis is to consider that discourse articulates text and social places. This means that its object is not textual organisation nor communicative situation, but what binds them through a certain genre. Like most French speaking discourse analysts, he draws on enunciative pragmatics.

His research has tackled a great diversity of corpora, apart from ordinary conversation: advertising, handbooks, literature, newspapers, politics, philosophy, religion, the Internet... He justifies the diversity of his corpora by claiming that discourse analysts must study any manifestation of discourse, instead of focusing only on conversation, media and other social areas such as politics, education, business, justice, the health system.

== Main topics ==
• Interdiscourse: building on his research on religious controversies, he has developed a theory of "intermisunderstanding". He assumes that in a given field the relevant unit of analysis is not each discourse in isolation but the ruled interaction between discourses through which the enunciative identities are defined and preserved. According to M.-A Paveau and G.-E. Sarfati, "Maingueneau shows how a discourse is born, how it develops into a consistent whole and a homogeneous space that lasts beyond the individual and temporal variations"

• Genres: like many other discourse analysts, he gives a central role to genres of discourse, which are analysed into various components: partners, place, time, etc. A genre is considered as a "scene of enunciation", which is broken down into a) an "enclosing scene" (religious, political, administrative, medical, etc.), b) a "generic scene" which assigns roles to actors, prescribes the right place and the right moment, the medium, the text superstructure, etc.; c) a “scenography”: the same generic scene, for instance preaching in a church, may stage different scenographies: prophetic, friendly, meditative... The word scène 'is chosen in order to stress the idea that the act of enunciation, parole, is a mise en scène, a sort of theatrical production that takes place in the form of a self-constituting process occurring within a defined discursive space. By adopting the theatrical metaphor of scène d’énonciation, Maingueneau endeavors to enter discourse “from the inside.”

• Ethos: he contributed to introducing the question of ethos into the field of discourse analysis. He has developed the concept of “embodiment” (in French « incorporation »): the addressee constructs a certain image of the speaker, by giving him/her psychological (“character”) and somatic (“corporality”) properties, based on shared stereotypes

• Self-constituting discourses: in the universe of discourse a specific area can be delimited: that of “self-constituting discourses” (science, philosophy, Art, law, philosophy religion). They have a particular relationship with the foundations of society. To found other discourses without being founded by them, they must set themselves up as intimately bound with a legitimising Source and show that they are in accordance with it, owing to the operations by which they structure their texts. Maingueneau has mainly studied literature and philosophy, in this perspective. Tightly connected with self-constituting discourses, the concept of paratopy has been widely used in literary theory, in particular in postcolonial; and gender studies.

• Textless sentences (or “aphorisations”): a multitude of sentences that do not belong to a text, a cohesive sequence of sentences, are in circulation: they can by definition be detached (mottos, slogans, sayings...) or extracted from texts (maxims, soundbites, titles in newspapers...). Maingueneau assumes that these sentences do not imply the same kind of enunciation as usual utterances: while in “texualizing enunciation” speakers produce texts belonging to genres, for aphorising enunciations the very notions of text and speaker are irrelevant

• Gender: he published two books about the figure of the fatal woman, and various articles about the relationship between woman and sayings and about the "Précieuses" of the French 17th century

• Adhering writings: these are not produced by a speaker, but are written on objects or human beings to which they are appropriated: labels on goods, the artist's name engraved on a sculpture, a plaque indicating the name of a street, a sentence on a T-shirt, the word "Police" on a uniform, etc. The addition of such writings modifies the identity of what they are applied to; they make it part of a new network of uses and actors.

== Publications ==
=== Discourse Analysis ===
==== Books ====
Initiation aux méthodes de l’analyse du discours, Paris, Hachette, 1976 (Spanish translation : Buenos Aires, Hachette, 1980).

Les livres d’école de la République, 1870-1914. Discours et idéologie, Paris, Le Sycomore, 1979.

Sémantique de la polémique, Lausanne, l’Age d'Homme, 1983.

Genèses du discours, Bruxelles-Liège, P. Mardaga, 1984 (Portuguese (Brazil) translation : Curitiba, Criar, 2005).

Nouvelles tendances en analyse du discours, Paris, Hachette, 1987 (Portuguese (Brazil) translation: Campinas, Pontes and Editora Unicamp, 2005).

L'Analyse du discours, Introduction aux lectures de l’archive, Paris, Hachette, 1991. Les termes clés de l’analyse du discours, Paris, Seuil, 1996 (Portuguese (Portugal) translation: Lisbon, Gradiva, 1997; Portuguese (Brazil) translation: Belo Orizonte, UFMG, 1998; Spanish translation: Buenos Aires, Nueva Vision, 1999; Bulgarian translation: Sofia, Saint-Clement University, 2000; Arabic translation: Beyrouth, Arab Scientific Publishers, 2009). Expanded and revised edition: collection « Points-Essais », Paris, Seuil, 2009.

Analyser les textes de communication, Paris, Dunod, 1998 (Portuguese (Brazil) translation: São Paulo, Cortez, 2001; Romanian translation: Iasi, Institutul European, 2007; Spanish translation: Buenos Aires, Nueva Visión, 2009). Expanded and revised edition: Paris, A. Colin, 2007 (Japanese translation: Tokyo, Hituzi Syobo, 2018).

Le Rapport de soutenance de thèse. Un genre universitaire, Lille, Presses du Septentrion, 2002 (in collaboration with C. Dardy and D. Ducard). Cenas de enunciação, Curitiba, Criar, 2006.

La littérature pornographique, Paris, Armand Colin, 2007 (Spanish translation: Buenos Aires, Nueva Vision, 2008; Portuguese (Brazil) translation: São Paulo, Parabola, 2010; Romanian translation: Iasi, Institutul European, 2011; Chinese translation: Fujian, Fujian Education Press, 2013).

Doze conceitos da Analise do Discurso, São Paulo, Parabola, 2010.

Les phrases sans texte, Paris, Armand Colin, 2012 (Portuguese (Brazil) translation: São Paulo, Parabola, 2014).

Discours et analyse du discours, Paris, A. Colin, 2014 (Portuguese (Brazil) translation: São Paulo, Parabola, 2015). Variaçōes sobre o ethos, São Paulo, Parábola, 2020. Enunciados aderentes, São Paulo, Parábola, 2022. L’ethos en analyse du discours, Academia, Louvain-la Neuve, 2022. As margens do discurso, São Paulo, Contexto, 2025.

==== Edited books ====
Dictionnaire d’Analyse du Discours (edited with P. Charaudeau), Paris, Seuil, 2002 (Portuguese (Brazil): São Paulo, Contexto, 2004; Spanish translation: Buenos Aires, Amorrortu, 2005; Arabic translation: Tunis, Centre National de Traduction, 2008). L’Analyse du discours dans les études littéraires (edited with R. Amossy), Toulouse, Presses du Mirail, 2004. The Discourse Studies Reader. Main currents in theory and analysis (edited with J. Angermuller and R. Wodak), Amsterdam, John Benjamins, 2014.

=== Linguistics and discourse analysis applied to literature ===
Éléments de linguistique pour le texte littéraire, Paris, Bordas, 1986 (Catalan translation: Valencia (Espagne), Tandem 1995; Portuguese (Brazil) translation: São Paulo, Martins Fontes, 1996; German translation: Tübingen, G. Narr, 2000; Romanian translation: Iasi, Institutul European, 2008). New edition: Linguistique pour le texte littéraire, Paris, Nathan, 2003.

Pragmatique pour le discours littéraire, Paris, Bordas, 1990 (Portuguese (Brazil) translation: São Paulo, Martins Fontes, 1996; Romanian translation: Iasi, Institutul European, 2007).

Le Contexte de l’œuvre littéraire, Paris, Dunod, 1993 (Portuguese (Brazil) translation: São Paulo, Martins Fontes, 1995; Lithuanian translation : Vilnius, Baltos Lankos, 1998).

Exercices de linguistique pour le texte littéraire (co-authored with G. Philippe), Paris, Dunod, 1997.

Le Discours littéraire. Paratopie et scène d’énonciation, Paris, A. Colin, 2004 (Portuguese (Brazil) translation: São Paulo, Contexto, 2006; Romanian translation: Iasi, Institutul European, 2008; Polish translation: Varsovie, Instytut Badaǹ Literackich, 2015).

Manuel de linguistique pour le texte littéraire, Paris, A. Colin, 2010.

Trouver sa place dans le champ littéraire. Paratopie et création, Louvain-la-neuve, Academia, 2016.

Paratopia. Literature as Discourse, Palgrave Macmillan, 2024.

=== Handbooks in linguistics ===
Linguistique française, Initiation à la problématique structurale I (co-authored with J.-L. Chiss and J. Filliolet), Paris, Hachette, 1977. Revised edition: Introduction à la linguistique française. Notions fondamentales, Phonétique, Lexique, Paris, Hachette, 2001. Linguistique française. Initiation à la problématique structurale II (co-authored with J.-L. Chiss and J. Filliolet), Paris, Hachette, 1978. Approche de l'énonciation en linguistique française, Paris, Hachette, 1981. New édition: L'énonciation en linguistique française, 1991 (Maltese translation: 2011). Syntaxe du français, Paris, Hachette Supérieur, 1994. Précis de grammaire pour les concours, Paris, Bordas, 1991. Revised édition: Paris, Armand Colin, 2015. Aborder la linguistique, Paris, Seuil, 1996 (Portuguese (Portugal) translation: Lisbon, Gradiva, 1997; Persian translation: Teheran, Diba, 2000). Expanded and revised edition: collection « Points-Essais », Paris, Seuil, 2009.

=== Essays ===
Carmen, les racines d'un mythe, Paris, Le Sorbier, 1984. Féminin fatal, Paris, Descartes, 1999. Contre Saint Proust, ou la fin de la Littérature, Paris, Belin, 2006.

=== Books about his research ===
Contribuições de Dominique Maingueneau para Análise do Discurso do Brasil, S. Possenti and R. Leiser Baronas (eds), São Carlos, Pedro & João, 2008.

Analyse du discours et dispositifs d'énonciation. Autour des travaux de Dominique Maingueneau, J. Angermuller and G. Philippe (eds), Limoges, Lambert-Lucas, 2015.

Les défis de l'analyse du discours. Entretien avec Dominique Maingueneau. Propos recueillis par Mhamed Dahi, Tanger (Maroc), Virgule Editions, 2021.
