= Studioteatret =

Norwegian theatre

Coordinates: 59°54′52″N 10°44′16″E

Studioteatret was a theatre in Norway. It opened in 1945, shortly after the liberation, with Claes Gill as its first theatre director. Studioteatret is regarded as one of the earliest post-war artistic expressions in Norway, and most of its members later played important roles in Norwegian theatre. Studioteatret closed 25 October 1950, due to economic difficulties, and its members were spread to various other theatres.

== Background ==
During the German occupation the theatres in Norway were subject to a Nazification process by the German occupants and the Nazi collaborationist government. The Nazis established a school called "Statens teaterskole", and demanded it to be mandatory for everybody that wanted to work in a theatre. The school was largely boycotted by students. When the Nazi government took control over the theatres by arresting resistant board members and inserting supporters in leading roles, the theatres experienced a general boycott from the public. When Henry Gleditsch, theatre director at Trøndelag Teater in Trondheim, was shot during the martial law in October 1942, the actors at various theatres, such as the National Theatre, initiated a silent opposition, which took various forms.

== The Stanislavski Group ==
A group of actors and students in Oslo started underground meetings where they secretly studied Stanislavski's system, named after the Russian actor and theatre director Constantin Stanislavski's theories of theatre. These meetings, often held in Jens Bolling's apartment, were potentially dangerous for the participants, as the Nazi authorities did not tolerate competition. The result of these undercover meetings was the founding of the theatre Studioteatret in 1945. Among the members of the group were the actors Jens Bolling, Liv Strømsted and Per Gjersøe from the National Theatre, and Gunnar Olram from Centralteatret. Other members of the group were Arne Thomas Olsen, Julia Back, Beth Borgen, Ingrid Bothner, Edel Eckblad, Johannes Eckhoff, Lisa Thams Jørgensen, Anne-Cath Schulerud, Sverre Hansen, Merete Skavlan and Per Sunderland. Claes Gill was a literary consultant and inspirator for the group.

== Initial reception ==
Following the liberation in May 1945, the group prepared a performance held 15 June 1945, when they presented two one-acters. They called themselves "Studioteatret". The first productions were adaptions of Thornton Wilder's The Long Christmas Dinner (Norwegian: Den lange julemiddagen), and Eugene O'Neill's Where the Cross Is Made (Norwegian: Mary Allen). Several government ministers were present at the premiere, along with chief editors and theatre critics from most of the Oslo newspapers, and the reception was overwhelming.

== Later repertoire ==
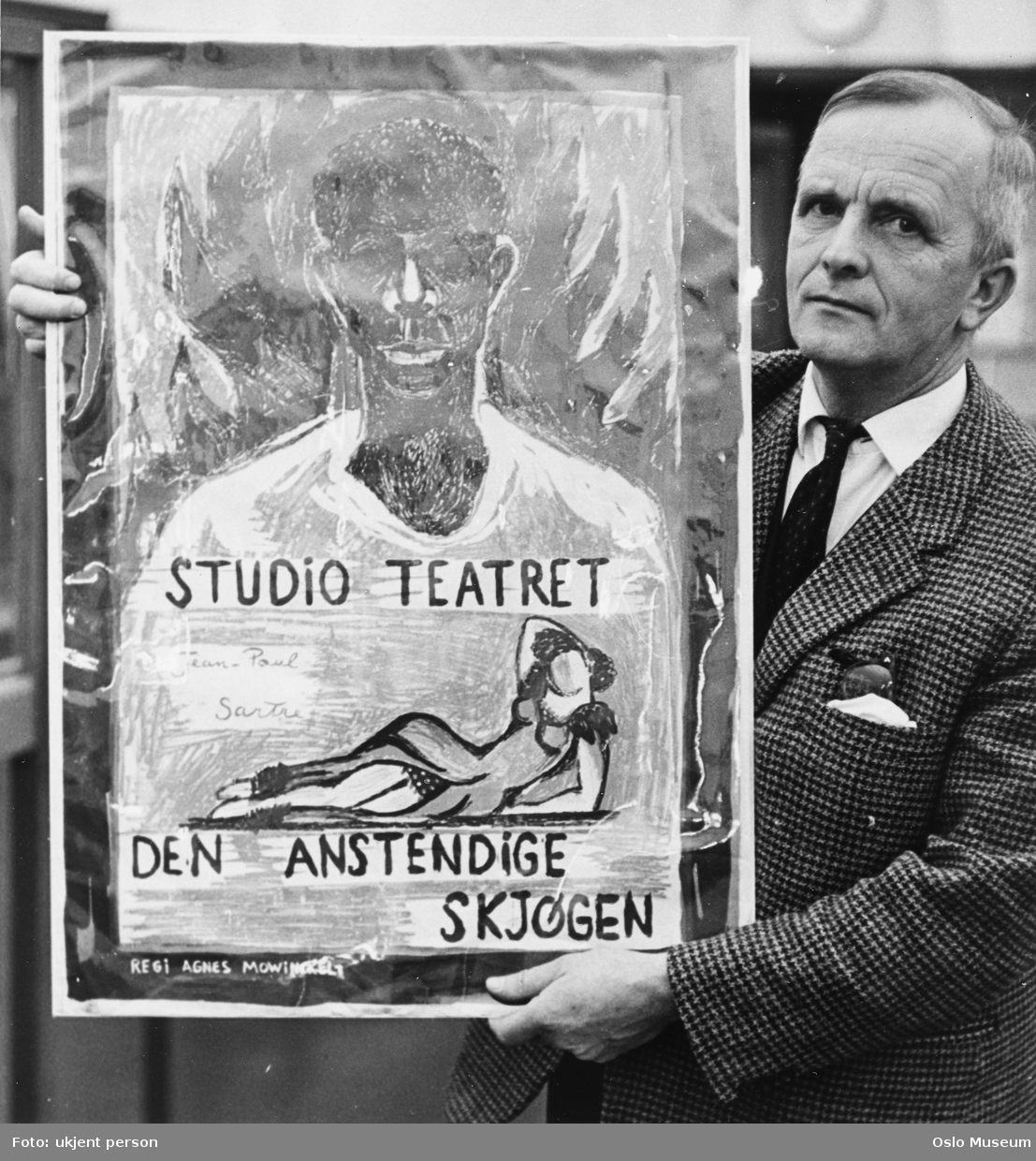
Poster for The Respectful Prostitute

Studioteatret existed from 1945 to 1950. Its first theatre director was Claes Gill. Their production in 1946 of Wilder's play Our Town, translated by Claes Gill, was a great success. Among the theatre's other productions in 1946 were adaptions of Anton Chekhov's A Marriage Proposal, Chekhov's The Wedding, and William Saroyan's The Beautiful People. 1947 included The Beggar's Opera and The Respectful Prostitute.

Studioteatret performed at Søilen Teater and later at the Carl Johan Theater, and its repertoire consisted of plays by playwrights such as Anton Chekhov, Bertolt Brecht, Eugene O'Neill, Shakespeare, Thornton Wilder, Arthur Miller and Jean-Paul Sartre. Later theatre directors were Gunnar Olram and Ole Oppen. In 1950 the theatre had to close, due to economic difficulties.

== Impact ==
Most of the members of Studioteatret later had central roles in Norwegian theatre. Claes Gill, Arne Thomas Olsen, Jens Bolling and Merete Skavlan were all later theatre directors. Others worked as stage producers and actors. The Norwegian National Academy of Theatre, established in 1953 and headed by Arne Thomas Olsen the next ten years, was heavily influenced by the group's working practice. The emerging new theatre institutions, such as Rogaland Teater (established in 1947), Riksteatret (established in 1948) and Fjernsynsteatret (opened in 1960), were influenced by members of the group.
