= Arne Thomas Olsen =

Norwegian actor and theatre director (1909–2000)

- Born: 3 December 1909; Oslo
- Died: 26 June 2000 (aged 90); Oslo

Arne Thomas Olsen (3 December 1909 – 26 June 2000) was a Norwegian actor, stage producer and theatre director. He was a driving force at Studioteatret, as both actor and producer.

== Early and personal life ==
Olsen was born in Kristiania, as the son of commercial traveller Thomas Olsen and Johanne Mathilde Johansen. He was married four times, first with actress Edel Eckblad from 1936 to 1946, then with actress Elisabeth Thams Jørgensen from 1946. In 1971 he married actress Isabel Andersson, and later journalist and theatre historian Else Martinsen. Olsen took his examen artium in 1928. He started working for the insurance company Idun in 1931, while also studying mathematics at the University of Oslo. He was awarded the university's gold medal for his mathematical work. He worked for the insurance company for fourteen years, until 1945, when he joined the new Studioteatret.

== Theatre career ==
=== The Stanislavski Group and Studioteatret ===
Olsen had joined the group of young actors and students that from the spring of 1943 secretly gathered to study Constantin Stanislavski's book on theatre. The theatres were then ruled by the Nazi government. The group met in actor Jens Bolling's apartment, while the poet Claes Gill was inspirator and literary consultant. Following the liberation in May 1945, the group prepared a performance, which was held 15 June 1945, when they presented two one-acters. They called themselves "Studioteatret". One of the presented plays was an adaption of Eugene O'Neill's Where the Cross Is Made, where Olsen in his stage debut played the role "Nat". Several government ministers were present, along with chief editors and theatre critics from most of the Oslo newspapers.

The reception was overwhelming, and Olsen, then 35 years old, made his decision: He left the insurance company, and joined the group full-time to participate in the development of Studioteatret. Studioteatret existed from 1945 to 1950. Olsen participated in the opening production, Leonid Leonov's Invasjon in 1945. In 1946 he played in adaptions of Anton Chekhov's A Marriage Proposal, he was "the captain" in Chekhov's The Wedding, and "the father" in William Saroyan's The Beautiful People. In 1947 he participated in The Beggar's Opera and in The Respectful Prostitute. Among his later roles were the emperor in Keiserens nye klær, and "Johan von Ehrenpreiss" in Kjærlighet uten strømper. The originally group gradually dissolved, and Studioteatret closed in October 1950.

=== Later career ===
In 1950 Olsen worked for Riksteatret, as both actor and speaker. He was employed as actor and stage producer at Det Nye Teater in 1951. He headed the Norwegian National Academy of Theatre from 1953 to 1963, and was instructor at the National Theatre from 1956 to 1959. He served as theatre director at Rogaland Teater from 1970 to 1976. He later worked as actor and stage producer at Riksteatret, Den Nationale Scene, Det Norske Teatret, Oslo Nye Teater, Radioteatret and Fjernsynsteatret. He issued the books Olsen fra bakgården (1977), Håpets hotell (1983), Champagne og soloppgang (1988), Takk New York (1991), and Studioteatret: Frihet og fornyelse (1995, together with Else Martinsen). Olsen was chairman for Norsk Sceneinstruktør-Forening from 1962 to 1966, and later honorary member. He was chairman for Norsk Teaterlederforening from 1974 to 1976.

Cultural offices
Preceded by Bjørn Endreson	Director of the Rogaland Teater; 1970–1976	Succeeded by Kjetil Bang-Hansen
