= Hansine Lund =

Norwegian stage actor

Hansine Lund (1817 – after 1896) was a Norwegian (originally Danish) stage actress. She was a leading actress first in the company of Jacob Mayson and then for Gustav Wilhelm Selmer at the Trøndelag Teater in a period when there professional theatre in Norway, outside of Oslo, consisted of travelling Danish theatre companies and few actors became known other than temporarily.
