= Liv Dommersnes =

Norwegian actress and reciter of poetry

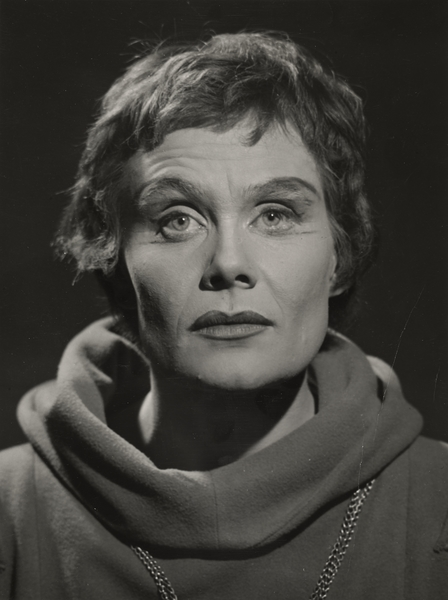
- Born: 28 September 1922; Kristiania, Norway
- Died: 6 April 2014 (aged 91)
- Occupation: Actress
- Spouse: Jens Bolling

Liv Dommersnes (née Strømsted; 28 September 1922 – 6 April 2014) was a Norwegian actress and reciter of poetry. She was a member of group that founded Studioteatret in 1945.

== Personal life ==
Liv Strømsted was born in Kristiania (now Oslo), Norway. She was the daughter of storekeeper Jørgen Andreas Strømsted (1891–1942) and Signe Beatrice Hansen (1893–1984). She was married to actor Jens Bolling (1915–1992) from 1945 to 1952, and to physician Ivar Dommersnes (1913–1994) from 1968 until his death in 1994. She was also in a secret relationship with Johan Borgen, as chronicled in her 2001 memoirs Alt har sin tid.

== Career ==
She made her stage debut as "Helga" in Bjørnstjerne Bjørnson's play Geografi og kjærlighed at the National Theatre in Oslo in 1942, in the last production directed by Bjørnson's son Bjørn Bjørnson. She was employed at the National Theatre from 1941–45, and again from 1949.

During the German occupation of Norway the situation at the theatres was characterized by severe nazification attempts from the authorities, and boycott from the public. Strømsted joined the group of actors that started underground meetings where they secretly studied Stanislavski's system. The result of these undercover meetings was the founding of the theatre Studioteatret in 1945. She played for Studioteatret from 1945 to 1949. Among her roles were "Emily" in an adaption of Thornton Wilder's play Our Town, "Polly" in Weill and Brecht's The Beggar's Opera, and "Natasja" in Anton Chekhov's A Marriage Proposal.

She interpreted several roles from Henrik Ibsen's plays. One of her most important roles was "Nora" in A Doll's House, which she played at Rogaland Teater in 1950, for Radioteatret in 1953, for Riksteatret in 1956, and at the National Theatre in 1957. She acted in the films Andrine og Kjell from 1951 and Blodveien from 1955. She participated in nearly 100 productions for Radioteatret.

From 1965, Dommersnes initiated a career as a reciter of poetry, performing all over Scandinavia, either alone or with musicians. Several of her performances were broadcast by radio or television. Her 50th anniversary as an actor was celebrated at the National Theatre in January 1992. In 2001. she wrote an autobiography, Alt har sin tid. She was honorary member of The Association of Artists (Kunstnerforeningen) from 1975, and of the Norwegian Actors' Equity Association from 1999. She was a member of the Norwegian Academy for Language and Literature.

== Honours ==
She received several prizes, including Oslo City's Artist's award in 1985, the Herman Wildenvey Poetry Award in 1999, and the honorary prize of the Norwegian Broadcasting Corporation's Radioteatret in 2001. In 2000 she was decorated as a Knight, First Class of the Order of St. Olav. In 2000, she was also awarded the Anders Jahres Cultural Prize (Anders Jahres kulturpris).

== Death ==
She died on 6 April 2014, aged 91.
