= Blindpassasjer =

Norwegian television series

- Genre: Science fiction, Thriller, Crime fiction
- Written by: Jon Bing; Tor Åge Bringsværd
- Directed by: Stein Roger Bull
- Narrated by: Erik Tandberg
- Music by: Egil Monn-Iversen
- Country of origin: Norway
- Original language: Norwegian
- No. of episodes: 3

Production
- Production company: Norwegian Broadcasting Corporation

Original release
- Release: 27 October – 9 November 1978

Blindpassasjer (Norwegian: Stowaway, literally "blind passenger"; English title: Marco Polo) is a 3 episode Norwegian science fiction television series first aired in 1978. It aired 3 episodes. Directed by Stein Roger-Bull, the story was written by Jon Bing and Tor Åge Bringsværd for which they won the 1978 Riverton Prize.

The show follows the experiences of 5 crew members aboard the starship Marco Polo as they return to Earth from the distant planet Rossum. The crew are awoken from their hibernation deep sleep to find mysterious images on security footage of a mysterious ghostly stowaway. Subsequent investigations reveal that one of the crew has been replaced by a Biomat (a biological robot from Rossum), that has assumed their likeness.

Blindpassasjer is noteworthy for being the first science fiction series to air on Norwegian television.

== Cast ==
- Trini Lund as Elis, an ecologist in charge of ecosystems
- Henny Moan as Leda, a physicist and mechanical engineer
- Marit Østbye as Gaia, a biologist overseeing biosystems
- Bjørn Floberg as Akeron, a computer specialist managing information systems
- Ola B Johannessen as Jason, a sociologist and linguist
- Ole-Jørgen Nilsen as the bureaucrat at Nexus Station
- - and the dog Cassius
- Erik Tandberg as narrator
