= Ketil Egge =

Norwegian actor and theatre director

Ketil Egge (11 March 1950 – 26 March 1997) is a Norwegian actor and theatre director.

Egge was born in Oslo as a son of composer Klaus Egge. He made his stage debut at Trøndelag Teater in 1971, and was then hired at Teatret Vårt in 1973 and Rogaland Teater in 1975. He was the director of Rogaland Teater from 1991 to 1994 and Den Nationale Scene from 1995 to 1996.

Cultural offices
Preceded by Alf Nordvang	Director of the Rogaland Teater; 1991–1994	Succeeded by Ola B. Johannessen
Preceded by Tom Remlov	Director of the Den Nationale Scene; 1996–1997	Succeeded by Aksel-Otto Bull
