= Ole-Jørgen Nilsen =

Norwegian actor (1936–2008)

- Born: 28 February 1936
- Died: 15 June 2008 (aged 72)
- Spouse(s): Kari Rasmussen

Ole-Jørgen Nilsen (28 February 1936 – 15 June 2008) was a Norwegian actor who was perhaps best known for playing the role of Hans Fredrik Rosenkrantz in the soap Hotel Cæsar and from a recurring role in the Olsenbanden films.

== Career ==
Nilsen made his debut as a student at Nationaltheatret in 1959 and graduated from the Norwegian National Academy of Theatre in the same year. He has since worked with Trøndelag Teater in 1961–68, Det Norske Teatret in 1968–73, Fjernsynsteatret in 1974–77, and Nationaltheatret since 1977.

At the Trøndelag Teater, he made his debut in 1966 as the narrator of the piece Heat wave by Ted Williams. At Det Norske Teater he took part in translated productions such as Myrfolket, Johann uten land, Montserrat and not least, playing van Gogh in Postmannen fra Arles. With Nationaltheatret he played among others, a jealous Salieri in Amadeus. He also had central roles in Ibsen's The League of Youth and Peer Gynt.

In the 2000s, he has acted in works including The Master Builder (2003), Maria Stuart (2004) and Til Damaskus (2006), all with Nationaltheatret.

Nilsen was head of Nationaltheatret from 1988 to 1989 together with Ellen Horn and Sverre Rødahl. He was part of Skuespillerforeningen in 1978, and its first foreman.

Nilsen was nominated for the Per Aabels ærespris in 2000.

== Filmography ==
- 2008 Do or Die-08 Short addition to Love Is War
- 2005 Selected Shorts#2: European Award Winners (Video)
- 2004 Lies Inc. ...Benefactor
- 2003 United ...Johansen
- 2002 De beste går først ...Ragnar (in section Folk flest bor i Kina)
- 2000 De 7 dødssyndene
- 2000 Hovmod
- 1989 Kamilla og tyven II ...Thygesen
- 1985 Galskap! ....Erik
- 1984 Men Olsenbanden var ikke død ...toller
- 1982 Olsenbandens aller siste kupp ....bodyguard
- 1981 Olsenbanden gir seg aldri! ...Director of TeamFinans
- 1979 Olsenbanden og Dynamitt-Harry mot nye høyder ...The big Baron
- 1979 Rallarblod ...Øl-Kalle
- 1976 Olsenbanden for full musikk ...Sjåføren
- 1976 Angst Lendl
- 1975 Faneflukt ...Politibetjent Lind
- 1974 Bobbys krig ...Klaus
- 1972 Motforestilling
- 1972 Olsenbanden tar gull ...Ricco, international swindler
- 1972 Lukket avdeling ...Paul Paulus
- 1970 Love Is War ....Espen
- 1968 Hennes meget kongelige høyhet ...Anderson, livvakt
- 1961 Hans Nielsen Hauge ...Sergeant in Fredrikstad

== TV roles ==
- 2004-06 Hotel Cæsar ...Hans Fredrik Rosenkrantz
- 2001 Rosmersholm (TV 2001) ...Ulrik Brendel (Fjernsynsteater)
- 1997 Blind gudinne ...Bjerke (mini-series)
- 1995 Rett I Lomma ...Hr Fylking (Play broadcast by NRK)
- 1988 Fleksnes - Blodgiveren '88 ...leges
- 1985 The Last Place on Earth ...Alfred Eriksen (mini-series)
- 1978 Blindpassasjer ...Byråkraten (mini-series)
- 1973 Et Dukkehjem ...Sakfører Krogstad (Fjernsynsteater)
- 1972 Fleksnes - Blodgiveren ...Doctor

Cultural offices
Preceded by Kjetil Bang-Hansen	Director of the National Theatre (with Ellen Horn and Sverre Rødahl); 1988–1990	Succeeded by Stein Winge
