= Eksingedal Church =

Church in Vestland, Norway

- Eksingedal kyrkje
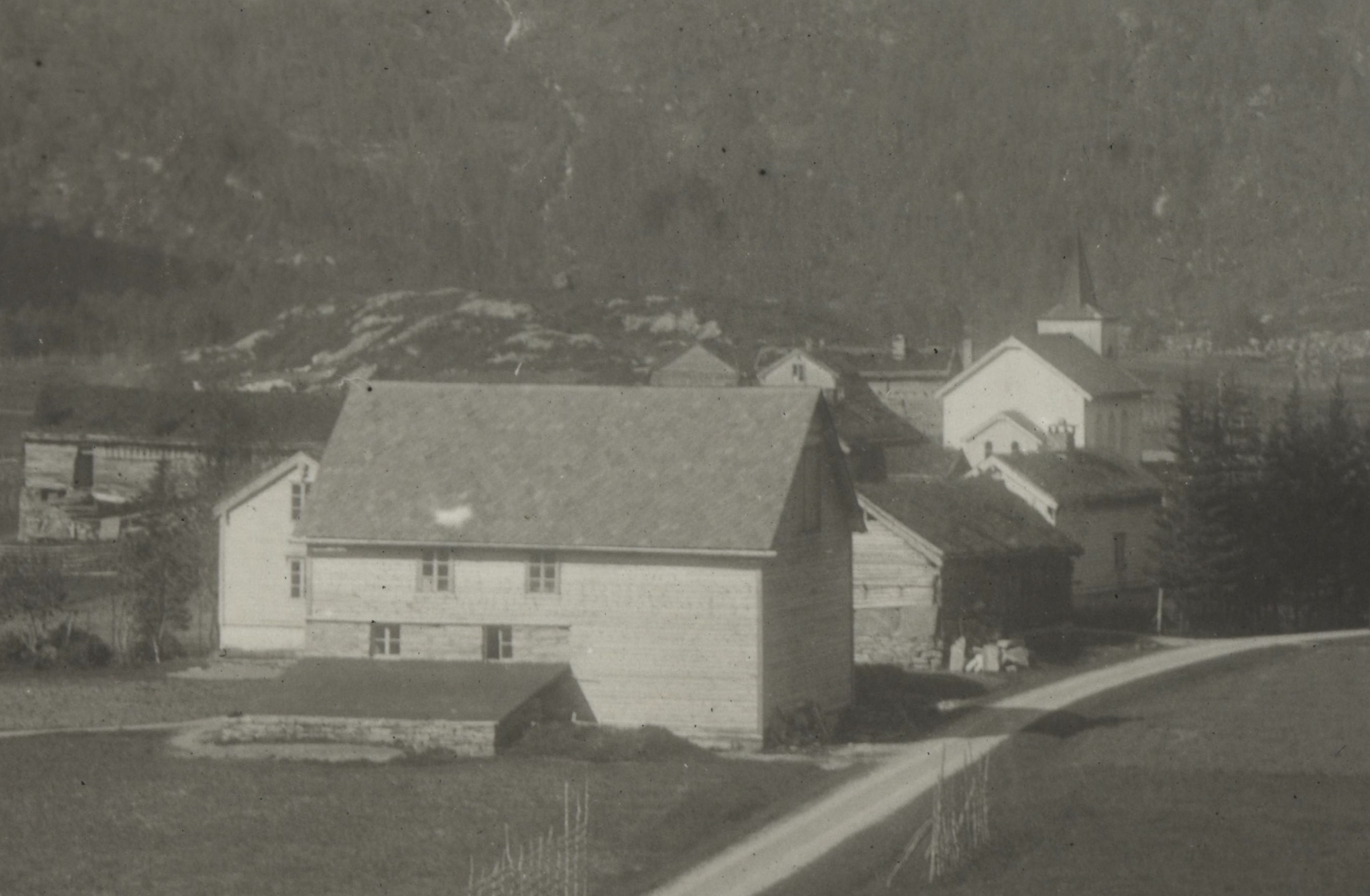
- View of the church
- Eksingedal Church
- 60°47′05″N 5°57′33″E
- Location: Vaksdal, Vestland
- Country: Norway
- Denomination: Church of Norway
- Churchmanship: Evangelical Lutheran

History
- Former name: Flatekval Chapel
- Status: Parish church
- Founded: c. 1626
- Consecrated: 12 June 1883

Architecture
- Functional status: Active
- Architect: Hartvig Sverdrup Eckhoff
- Architectural type: Long church
- Completed: 1883 (143 years ago)

Specifications
- Capacity: 120
- Materials: Stone

Administration
- Diocese: Bjørgvin bispedømme
- Deanery: Hardanger og Voss prosti
- Parish: Eksingedal
- Norwegian Cultural Heritage Site
- Type: Church
- Status: Not protected
- ID: 84083

Eksingedal Church (Norwegian: Eksingedal kyrkje) is a parish church of the Church of Norway in Vaksdal Municipality in Vestland county, Norway. It is located in the village of Flatkvål in the Eksingedalen valley. It is the church for the Eksingedal parish which is part of the Hardanger og Voss prosti (deanery) in the Diocese of Bjørgvin. The stone church was built in a long church design in 1883 using plans drawn up by the architect Hartvig Sverdrup Eckhoff. The church seats about 120 people.

== History ==
The earliest existing historical records of the church date back to 1626 when an annex chapel was built on this site. The chapel was called Flatekval kapell. There is some evidence that could be interpreted to show that the chapel built in 1626 was built to replace another chapel dating to the Middle Ages, but that is not known for sure. The rectangular, wooden chapel measured about 6.7 by 6.3 metres (22 ft × 21 ft). The chapel fell under the Mo Church parish, and the chapel had one worship service each year on the feast day for St. Swithun (2 July). By 1666, the building was reportedly already in poor condition. In 1883, the Eksingedalen valley became a separate parish, so the chapel was torn down to make room for a new, larger church. Hartvig Sverdrup Eckhoff was hired to design the new church. The new building measured about 13.4 by 9.3 metres (44 ft × 31 ft). It also had a 4.3-by-3.4-metre (14 ft × 11 ft) church porch with a tower above. The church was consecrated on 12 June 1883. A sacristy was added to the east of the chancel according to drawings by Sigmund Lie in 1984.

== See also ==
- List of churches in Bjørgvin
