= Levinger =

Levinger is a Jewish surname that may be derived from the name Levi. It may refer to:

- Beryl Levinger (born 1947), American educator
- George Levinger (1927–2017), American psychologist
- Lowell Levinger (born 1944), American musician
- Matthew Levinger (born 1960), American historian
- Moshe Levinger (1935–2015), Israeli rabbi
- Shlomo Levinger (born 1997), American magician

== See also ==
- Levanger (disambiguation)
- Loevinger
