= Jens Bolling =

Norwegian actor and theatre director (1915–1992)

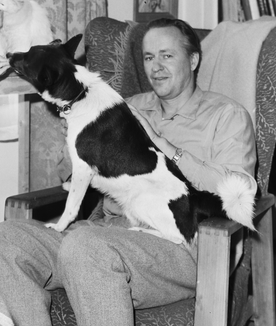
- Born: 23 June 1915; Levanger, Norway
- Died: 13 December 1992 (aged 77)
- Occupations: actor and theatre director
- Known for: co-founder of Studioteatret; interpreter of fairy-tales
- Spouses: actress Liv Strømsted (1945–1952); actress Ingrid Bothner; actress Marit Bolling

Jens Bolling (23 June 1915 – 13 December 1992) was a Norwegian actor and theatre director. He was among the founders of Studioteatret, and a well-known interpreter of Norwegian fairy-tales.

== Early and personal life ==
Bolling was born in Levanger, as the son of saw mill manager Sigvard Bolling and Borghild Elnan. He grew up at the farm Brekke in the valley Maridalen north of Oslo. His mother died early, and his grandmother took her place. She was an eminent narrator of legends and fairytales. Also story telling among the farm workers and mill workers had influence on Bolling's later acting career. He had his first performance experience when he was seven years old, in a former hen house, playing Ludvig Holberg's Jeppe.

He was married three times; first to actress Liv Strømsted from 1945 to 1952. He was then married to actress Ingrid Bothner, and later to actress Marit Bolling.

== Career ==
Bolling was employed at the National Theatre in Oslo from 1936 to 1945. During the German occupation of Norway the situation at the theatres was characterized by nazification from the authorities, and boycott from the public. Bolling was forced to play the lead role in Halvorsen's propaganda play Før stormen, after two other actors had fled to Sweden in order to avoid playing the role. Shortly before, in October 1942, Henry Gleditsch, theatre director at Trøndelag Teater in Trondheim had been shot by the German occupants, and from then the actors at Nationaltheatret initiated a silent sabotage, resulting in all sorts of difficulties for the management.

In 1941 Bolling was elected chairman of the organisation Unge Skuespilleres Forening. This organisation started underground meetings, often at Bolling's home, where they secretly studied the Stanislavski's system. The result of these undercover meetings was the founding of the theatre Studioteatret in 1945.

Bolling played for Studioteatret from 1945 to 1949, and served as theatre director at Rogaland Teater from 1949 to 1951. Among his roles at Rogaland Teater was the lead role in Henrik Ibsen's Peer Gynt, and "Helmer" in A Doll's House. He worked for Den Nationale Scene from 1954 to 1956. He was regarded as an eminent interpreter of Norwegian fairy tales, as a reciter in radio and later television. He issued the book Teater i krig in 1983.

== Filmography ==
| Year | Title | Role | Notes |
|---|---|---|---|
| 1938 | Det drønner gjennom dalen | Streikebryter | |
| 1942 | Det æ'kke te å tru | Olaf Borg | |
| 1951 | Dei svarte hestane | Henrik Nordbø | |
| 1952 | Emergency Landing | Knut | |
| 1957 | Nine Lives | Alfred, kjelketrekker | |
| 1962 | Kort är sommaren | The Blacksmith | |
| 1982 | Krypskyttere | Arthur Skjolden | |
| 1985 | Havlandet | Den Blinde | |

Cultural offices
| Preceded by Øistein Børke | Director of the Rogaland Teater; 1949–1951 | Succeeded by Kjell Stormoen |
