= Gunnar Olram =

Norwegian actor

- Born: 19 December 1908; Halden, Norway
- Died: 12 January 2001 (aged 92)
- Occupation(s): Actor and stage director

Gunnar Carl Andreas Olram (19 December 1908 – 12 January 2001) was a Norwegian actor and stage instructor.

== Early life ==
Olram was born in Halden on 19 December 1908.

== Professional career ==
He made his stage debut at Centralteatret in 1930. From 1931 to 1934, he worked at Oscarsteatern, and from 1934 to 1944, he was back at Centralteatret. From 1945 to 1950, he was assigned at Studioteatret, and later at Folketeatret, Oslo Nye Teater and Nationaltheatret. Among his stage productions was Nils Kjær's play Det lykkelige valg. He chaired the Norwegian Actors' Equity Association from 1962 to 1964.

Olram died in Oslo on 12 January 2001, at the age of 92.
