= Kjetil Bang-Hansen =

Norwegian actor, dancer, stage producer and theatre director

- Born: 16 May 1940 (age 86); Oslo, Norway
- Education: University of Oslo; Norwegian National Academy of Theatre
- Spouse(s): Inger Johanne-Rütter (1967－)
- Parent(s): Odd Bang-Hansen; Elise Aas
- Relatives: Pål Bang-Hansen (brother)
- Awards: Fritt Ord Award (1983)

Kjetil Bang-Hansen (born 16 May 1940) is a Norwegian actor, dancer, stage producer and theatre director.

== Early and personal life ==
Bang-Hansen was born in Oslo as the son of writer Odd Bang-Hansen and physician Elise Aas. He married dancer and choreographer Inger Johanne Rütter in 1967. He is brother of film producer and film critic Pål Bang-Hansen.

== Career ==
After examen artium Bang-Hansen studied at the Norwegian National Academy of Theatre from 1959 to 1962, and later at the University of Oslo and at theatres in Stockholm and London. He made his debut as actor at the Norwegian Broadcasting Corporation's Fjernsynsteatret in 1961. He was employed as actor and dancer at the revue stage Edderkoppen from 1962 to 1963, and at Oslo Nye Teater from 1963 to 1966. His debut as instructor was an adaptation of William Gibson's Two For The Seesaw at Trøndelag Teater in 1967. Later the same year he also staged adaptations of Harold Pinter's The Dumb Waiter (Kjøkkenheisen) and Eugène Ionesco's La Cantatrice chauve (Den skallete sangerinnen). Among his other productions are Ibsen's Ghosts (Gengangere), Brand and An Enemy of the People (En folkefiende), Shakespeare's Romeo and Juliet, and Cecilie Løveid's Maria Q.

Bang-Hansen was part of the group that established the regional theatre for Møre og Romsdal, Teatret Vårt, in 1972. At this theatre he produced an adaptation of Shakespeare's Comedy of Errors in 1972, Kaj Munk's Ordet in 1973, and Henrik Ibsen's Kongsemnerne in 1974.

He headed the Norwegian National Academy of Theatre from 1973 to 1976, and was theatre director at Rogaland Teater in Stavanger from 1976 to 1982. During his period at Rogaland Teater this theatre became one of the most central theatres in Norway. His adaptation of Ibsen's verse play Peer Gynt received much acclaim, and it was also played at the Belgrade International Theatre Festival, giving Bang-Hansen international recognition. At Rogaland Teater he also produced a theatre adaptation of Lev Tolstoj's story The Story of a Horse.

He was theatre director at Den Nationale Scene in Bergen from 1982 to 1986, where one of his most important productions was an adaptation of Sofokles' Theban plays. He was theatre director at the National Theatre in Oslo from 1986 to 1987, when he had to resign due to failed economic success. He was theatre director at Oslo Nye Teater from 1998 to 2001. A selection of his writings on theatre was issued in his book Trommer og sang (1987).

In 1983 he was awarded the Fritt Ord Award. He received the Norwegian Critics Prize for Theatre in 1999/2000, and the Hedda Award in 2003. He is a member of the Norwegian Academy for Language and Literature.

Cultural offices
Preceded by Arne Thomas Olsen	Director of the Rogaland Teater; 1976–1982	Succeeded by Alf Nordvang
Preceded by Sven Henning	Director of the Den Nationale Scene; 1982–1986	Succeeded by Tom Remlov
Preceded by Toralv Maurstad	Director of the National Theatre; 1986–1988	Succeeded by Ellen Horn; Ole-Jørgen Nilsen; Sverre Rødahl
Awards
Preceded by Lech Wałęsa and Hallvard Rieber-Mohn	Recipient of the Fritt Ord Award; 1983	Succeeded by Nordnorsk forfatterlag
