= Gustav Selmer Fougner =

American wine and restaurant critic

Gustav Selmer Fougner (August 24, 1884–1941) was a wine and restaurant critic best known for his column "Along the Wine Trail".

== Life ==
Gustav Selmer Fougner was born in Chicago in a Norwegian-Danish family, of Albert Cato Fougner (1845–1923) and Mathilde Selmer (1850–1923). His grandfather Gustav Wilhelm Selmer (1814–1875) was an actor manager in the Trøndelag Teater of Trondheim, in Norway.

Gustav Selmer Fougner moved from Chicago to New York in 1906 and worked as a reporter for the New York Herald. He joined the New York Sun in 1912, becoming its chief European correspondent and covering the First World War until 1917. In the following years he worked for the United States Treasury, worked briefly for the Sun again, became a freelance writer, and then rejoined the Sun in 1931, remaining until his death in New York City from a heart attack in 1941, aged fifty-six.

== Food and wine ==
In 1933, under the byline G. Selmer Fougner, he began publication of a daily column in the Sun called "Along the Wine Trail". He was the first regular wine critic for a New York newspaper, but in addition to discussing wine, the column included restaurant criticism and recipes. In 1939, Fougner published a restaurant guide to New York, Dining Out in New York, and in 1941 Gourmet Dinners. In addition to including recipes from well-known restaurants of the time, Gourmet Dinners detailed Fougner's involvement with numerous dining societies such as Les Amis d'Escoffier and recounted banquets he had organized for their members.

Fougner has been described as presenting "the classic image of a connoisseur of the good life. Portly, balding, and always impeccably dressed, he was known as 'The Baron' in the larger world of food and wine that was his daily beat."

== Bibliography ==
- Along the Wine Trail (The Sun Printing and Publishing Assoc., 1934)
- Dining Out in New York - and What to Order (H.C. Kinsey, 1939)
- Gourmet Dinners (M. Burrows & Co Inc., 1941)
