= Arne Nøst =

Norwegian visual artist and theatre director

- Born: 17 July 1962 (age 64); Levanger, Norway
- Occupations: Visual artist, theatre director
- Employer(s): Rogaland Teater, Riksteatret
- Awards: Hedda Award (2019)

Arne Nøst (born 17 July 1962) is a Norwegian graphic artist and theatre director. He has been theatre director at Rogaland Teater and at Riksteatret

== Life and career ==
Born in Levanger on 17 July 1962, Nøst grew up in Molde, and is educated as a graphic artist at the Norwegian National Academy of Fine Arts. He has illustrated several books, contributed to newspapers, and been responsible for decoration of buildings. He was a theatre director at the Rogaland Teater from 2009 to 2017.

Nøst won a Hedda Award in 2019, for Janove Ottesen and Christian Eriksen's musical play The Mute.

In 2020 he succeeded Tom Remlov as artistic director for the touring theatre Riksteatret, a position he held until 2025.

Cultural offices
Preceded by Hanne Tømta	Director of the Rogaland Teater; 2009–2018	Incumbent
Preceded by Tom Remlov	Director of the Riksteatret; 2020–2025	Succeeded by Wenche Viktorsdatter Paulsen
