= Bjørn Endreson =

Norwegian actor and director

- Born: 20 January 1922; Bærum, Norway
- Died: 12 November 1998 (aged 76)
- Occupation(s): Actor; Theatre director

Bjørn Endreson (20 January 1922 – 12 November 1998) was a Norwegian actor, stage producer, and theatre director.

== Biography ==
Endreson was born in Bærum. He worked as actor and stage producer at Rogaland Teater from 1957 to 1960, and served as theatre director from 1960 to 1970. He founded the children's theatre (Norwegian: Barneteatret) at Rogaland Teater.

From 1970 he translated and staged a large number of Samuel Beckett's plays for Det Norske Teatret.

Endreson issued the poetry collection Kadens in 1946.

Cultural offices
Preceded by Bjarne Andersen	Director of the Rogaland Teater; 1960–1970	Succeeded by Arne Thomas Olsen
