= Aksel-Otto Bull =

Norwegian theatre director

- Born: 22 February 1963 (age 62); Oslo, Norway
- Occupation: Theatre director

Aksel-Otto Bull (born 22 February 1963) is a Norwegian theatre director.

He is born in Oslo. He worked as a stage director at Nova Teater from 1984 to 1985, and has later worked for Nordland Teater, Agder Teater and Den Nationale Scene. He was artistical director at Den Nationale Scene in 1997.

Cultural offices
Preceded by Ketil Egge	Director of the Den Nationale Scene; 1997	Succeeded by Lars Arrhed
