= Ingjerd Egeberg =

Norwegian actress and theatre director

- Born: 19 May 1967 (age 58); Moelv, Norway
- Occupations: Actress and theatre director

Ingjerd Egeberg (born 19 May 1967) is a Norwegian actress and theatre director.

She was born in Moelv, and graduated from the Norwegian National Academy of Theatre in 1994. She has been employed at Hålogaland Teater and Rogaland Teater, was the director of Rogaland Teater from 2000 to 2004. She took the role of Anne in 2022 drama Fenris.

Cultural offices
Preceded by Eirik Stubø	Director of the Rogaland Teater; 2000–2004	Succeeded by Hanne Tømta
