= Alf Nordvang =

Norwegian actor and theatre director

- Born: 15 December 1931; Bærum
- Died: 11 June 2007 (aged 75); Sola
- Awards: King's Medal of Merit in Gold (2001)

Alf Nordvang (15 December 1931 – 11 June 2007) was a Norwegian actor and theatre director.

He was born in Bærum Municipality. He made his stage debut at Det Norske Teatret in 1954, was hired at Falkbergets Teater in the same year and Rogaland Teater in 1957. He was the director of Rogaland Teater from 1982 to 1986 and 1990 to 1991.

Cultural offices
Preceded by Kjetil Bang-Hansen	Director of the Rogaland Teater; 1982–1986	Succeeded by Bentein Baardson
Preceded by Hans Rosenquist	Director of the Rogaland Teater; 1990–1991	Succeeded by Ketil Egge
