= Johan Conrad Huusher =

Norwegian-Danish actor and theatre director

Johan Conrad Huusher (1797–1869) was a Norwegian-Danish actor and theatre director.

Huusher was married to the actress Amalie Huusher and brother-in-law of the actors Wilhelmine Franck and Doris Bigum. He came to Norway in 1827 as a member of his brother-in-law Peder Lauritzen Bigum's theatre company. On Bigum's death in 1828, he took over the management of the company, which played an important role in contemporary Norwegian professional theatre, which at that time was almost entirely dominated by travelling Danish theatre companies. The company was active in Bergen with Julius Olsen in 1828 and 1829. He was the manager of the theatre company which staffed the Trøndelag Teater in 1829–1831, which had previously been used only by the local amateur theatre company and thus effectively founded the city's first permanent theatre. The building had previously only been used by Det Dramatiske Selskab, and he thereby created the first professional public theatre in the city and that part of Norway. Many major figures of the contemporary Norwegian theatre were employed in his company. He was succeeded by one of his actors, Carl Wilhelm Orlamundt, and Huusher was then active in Drammen.
