= Kristian Seltun =

Norwegian dramaturge and theatre director

- Born: 1970 (age 55–56); Bergen, Norway
- Education: University of Bergen
- Occupations: Dramaturge and theatre director

Kristian Seltun (born 1970) is a Norwegian dramaturge and theatre director.

He has been theatre director for Trøndelag Teater and Nationaltheatret, and has chaired the Arts Council Norway since 2026.

== Life and career ==
Seltun was born in Bergen in 1970. He graduated as cand.philol. from the University of Bergen.

Seltun has been director at the theatres Teaterhuset Avant Garden (1998-2001), Black Box teater (2001-2009), and Trøndelag Teater (2010-2018). He was appointed theatre director for Nationaltheatret from 2021, succeeding Hanne Tømta. He served as director of Nationaltheatret from 2021 to 2026. He was appointed chair of Arts Council Norway from 2026, succeeding Sigmund Løvåsen.

Cultural offices
Preceded by Otto Homlung	Director of the Trøndelag Teater; 2010–2018	Succeeded by Elisabeth Egseth Hansen
Preceded by Hanne Tømta	Director of the National Theatre; 2021–	Incumbent
