= Kari Rasmussen =

Norwegian actress and singer (1932–2021)

- Born: 5 October 1932; Skedsmo, Norway
- Died: 2 March 2021 (aged 88)
- Occupation(s): Operatic singer and actress
- Spouse: Ole-Jørgen Nilsen (m. 1971)

Kari Rasmussen (5 October 1932 – 2 March 2021) was a Norwegian singer and actress.

== Personal life ==
Rasmussen was born in Skedsmo, a daughter of factory owner Gunnar Rasmussen and Lena Thyvold. In 1971 she married actor Ole-Jørgen Nilsen.

== Career ==
Rasmussen made her concert debut in 1956 in Vienna. She was assigned with the Gelsenkirchen Opera House for six years, and her operatic career includes performing in the operas La bohème (as Mimi), in Orfeo ed Euridice (as Euridice) and in The Magic Flute (as Pamina). From 1969 until her retirement she was assigned with Det Norske Teatret in Oslo, where she was best known for her musical roles.

Rasmussen died in March 2021.
