= Carl Wilhelm Orlamundt =

Danish actor (1807–1871)

Carl Wilhelm Orlamundt (1807–1871) was a Norwegian-Danish actor manager.

He succeeded Johan Conrad Huusher as the manager of the theater company which staffed the Trøndelag Teater in 1831–1834, and was succeeded by Jacob Mayson. As such he played a major part in the theater history of Trondheim, which had no other permanent theatre in a period when Norway was almost entirely dominated by travelling theatre companies from Denmark. Many major figures of the contemporary Norwegian theatre was employed in his company.

After having left Norway, he became a leading theatre manager in 19th-century Danish provincial theatre. He was married to actor Petrine Orlamundt and father of actor Hans Orlamundt (1837–1912).
