= Eirik Stubø =

Norwegian stage producer and director

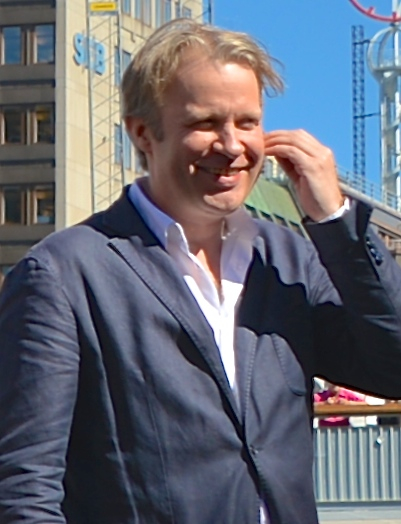
- Eirik Stubø at "Stockholms Kulturfestival" 2013.
- Born: Eirik Aasan Stubø; 16 June 1965 (age 60); Narvik, Norway
- Known for: Theatre producer and director
- Father: Thorgeir Stubø
- Relatives: Kjersti Stubø (sister); Håvard Stubø (brother)
- Awards: OBIE Award (2007); Norwegian Theatre Critics Award (2009); Hedda Award (2009)

Eirik Aasan Stubø (born 16 June 1965 in Narvik, Norway) is a Norwegian stage producer and theatre director.

He has been director of Rogaland Teater and Nationaltheatret in Norway, and Stockholms Stadsteater and the Royal Dramatic Theatre in Sweden. In addition to managing the theatres, he has directed a number of plays, and was awarded the OBIE Award in 2007, and the Norwegian Theatre Critics Award and the Hedda Award in 2009.

== Personal life ==
Stubø is the son of jazz guitarist Thorgeir Stubø (1943-1986) and Grete Karin Aasan Stubø (b. 1943), and brother of jazz guitarist Håvard and jazz singer Kjersti Stubø.

== Career ==
He was theatre director at the Rogaland Teater from 1997 to 2000, and theatre director at the National Theatre from 2000 to 2008. He received the OBIE Award for his production of Ibsen's play The Wild Duck, shown in New York City in 2006.

Besides working as a theater director Stubø has maintained a director career focusing on modern drama. When he leaves the theater, he will work at theatres in Norway, United States, Germany, Greece, Sweden and Hungary among others.

In 2013 to 2014, he was Theatre Manager at the Kulturhuset Stadsteatern. From 2014 he was appointed Theatre Manager of the Swedish Royal Dramatic Theatre, Dramaten, for the period 2015 to 2019.

== Honors ==
- OBIE Award (Off-Broadway Theater Award) for Vildanden (United States, 2007) the play was put up in New York City (2006)
- Kritikerprisen (Norwegian Critics Award) for Theatre 2009
- Hedda Award for best direction in 2009, for directing Ibsen's play Rosmersholm, at Nationaltheatret.

Cultural offices
Preceded by Ola B. Johannessen	Director of the Rogaland Teater; 1997–2000	Succeeded by Ingjerd Egeberg
Preceded by Ellen Horn	Director of the National Theatre; 2000–2008	Succeeded by Hanne Tømta
