= Ellen Horn =

Norwegian actress and politician

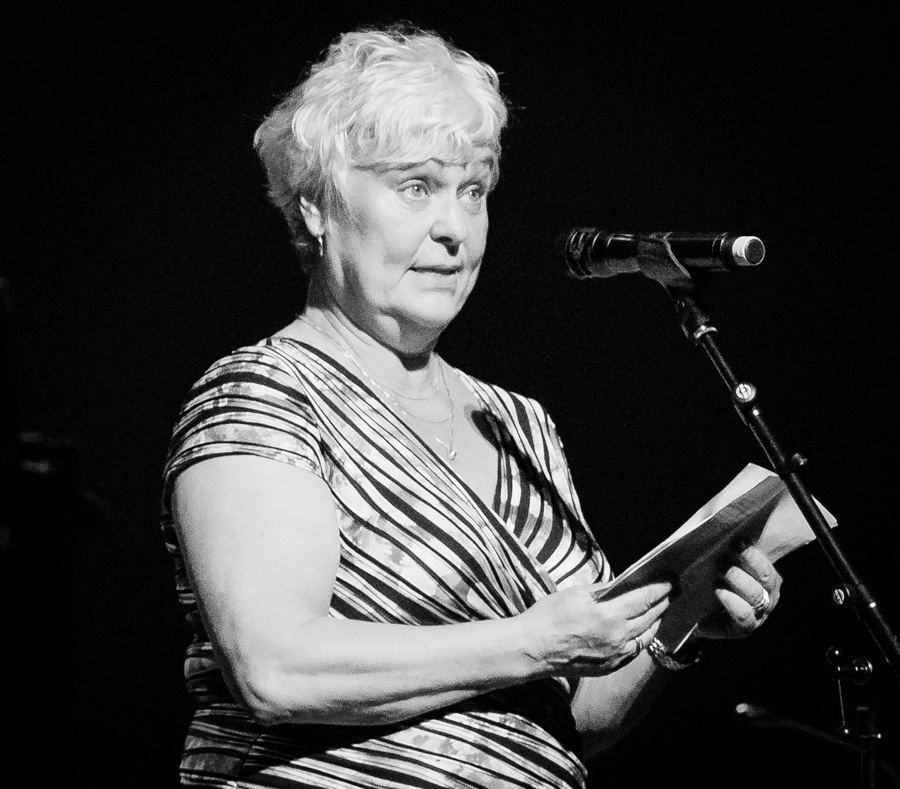

Minister of Culture
- In office 17 March 2000 – 19 October 2001
- Prime Minister: Jens Stoltenberg
- Preceded by: Åslaug Haga
- Succeeded by: Valgerd Svarstad Haugland

Personal details
- Born: Ellen Stoesen; 1 February 1951 (age 75) Montreal, Quebec, Canada
- Spouse: Jon Christensen
- Children: Kjersti Horn; Emilie Stoesen Christensen
- Occupation: Actor, Minister and Theater director

Ellen Horn (born Ellen Stoesen, 1 February 1951) is a Norwegian actress, theatre director, and politician for the Labour Party.

== Career ==
Horn started as a puppet actor at Oslo Nye Teater (1969–70), and was educated at the Teaterhøyskolen (1972–75), and since the late 1980s has been one of the most central and prominent figures in Norwegian theater. As an actress, she has distinguished herself by her versatility; as director at the Nationaltheatret (1992–2000), she managed to turn a money-losing company with a highly turbulent business culture into a thriving theater both financially and artistically. Horn has been an associate of Norsk Rikskringkasting and Nationaltheatret, and is currently director of Riksteatret.

Horn further developed and consolidated the Ibsen Festival, and led the Nationaltheatret through its 100th anniversary in 1999. On that occasion, she was appointed Commander of the Order of St. Olav. During Stoltenberg's First Cabinet she was Minister of Culture (2000–2001).

After leaving the cabinet, Horn returned to the Nationaltheatret as an actor, and in recent years she has toured with the theater productions Undset and Jeg kunne gråte blod (about Marie and Knut Hamsun). Both as theater director and as minister, she was met by doubts and questions whether she was qualified enough to undertake such large tasks, but she put most of the skepticism to shame with her hard and focused work and her pragmatic attitude, and by growing with the new roles.

== Private life ==
Horn was married (1988) to the Norwegian Jazz drummer Jon Christensen (1943–2020), and she has two children: theater director Kjersti Horn (b. 1977, from her marriage (1973–81) to scenographer Per Kristian Horn, b. 1941), and singer and actress Emilie Stoesen Christensen (b. 1986) from her current marriage.

== Honors ==
- Commander of the Order of St. Olav in 1999

== Selected acting roles ==
=== Theater ===
- Sigrid Undset in Undset (Trøndelag Teater 2005)

=== Film ===
- 1976: Oss as Vera
- 1985: Adjø solidaritet (Farewell Illusions) as Margrete

Cultural offices
Preceded by Kjetil Bang-Hansen	Director of the National Theatre (with Ole-Jørgen Nilsen and Sverre Rødahl); 1988–1990	Succeeded by Stein Winge
Preceded by Stein Winge	Director of the National Theatre; 1992–2000	Succeeded by Eirik Stubø
Preceded by Bente Erichsen	Director of the Riksteatret; 2005–2015	Succeeded by Tom Remlov
Political offices
Preceded by Åslaug Haga	Norwegian Minister of Culture; 2000–2001	Succeeded by Valgerd Svarstad Haugland
