= Tom Remlov =

Norwegian actor, dramaturg, film producer, theatre director and opera manager

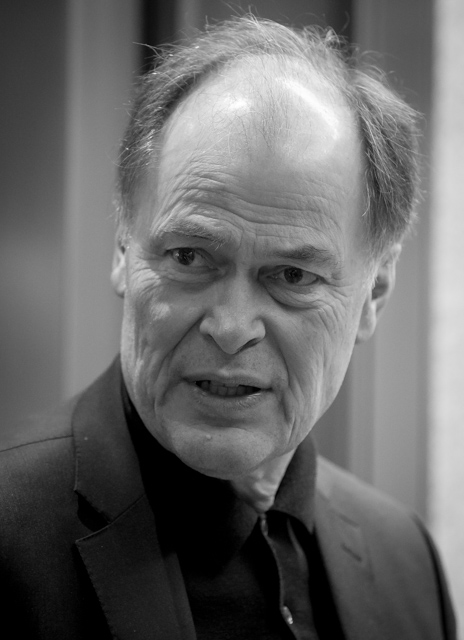
- Remlov in 2017
- Born: 21 July 1949 (age 77)
- Occupations: Actor, dramaturg, film producer, theatre director, opera manager

Tom Remlov (born 21 July 1949) is a Norwegian actor, dramaturg, film producer, theatre director, and opera manager.

He served as theatre director of Den Nationale Scene from 1986 to 1995, and was manager of Norsk Film from 1996 to 2001. He was manager of the Norwegian National Opera and Ballet from 2008. He resigned in July 2014, but becomes the new director of Riksteatret in April 2015.

He was decorated Knight, First Class of the Order of St. Olav in 2015.

Cultural offices
Preceded by Kjetil Bang-Hansen	Director of the Den Nationale Scene; 1986–1995	Succeeded by Ketil Egge
Preceded by	Managing director of the Norwegian National Opera and Ballet; 2008–2014	Succeeded by Nils Are Karstad Lysø
Preceded by Ellen Horn	Director of the Riksteatret; 2015–2020	Succeeded by Arne Nøst
