= Hanne Tømta =

Norwegian theatre director

- Born: 21 August 1968 (age 58); Oslo, Norway
- Education: University of Oslo; Saint Petersburg State Theatre Arts Academy
- Occupation: Theatre director
- Awards: Hedda Award (2015)

Hanne Tømta (born 21 August 1968) is a Norwegian theatre instructor and theatre director.

== Career ==
Born in Oslo on 21 August 1968, Tømta is educated at the University of Oslo (from 1987 to 1991), and at the Saint Petersburg State Theatre Arts Academy (from 1992 to 1998).

She has staged plays at the Hålogaland Teater, at the Sogn og Fjordane Teater and at Oslo Nye Teater. She directed the cabarets Kvinner på randen rir igjen and Jenter som kommer. Tømta was theatre director at the Rogaland Teater from 2005 to 2008, and was theatre director at Nationaltheatret from 2009 to 2020.

== Awards ==
Tømta won the Hedda Award for Best Direction in 2015, for an adaptation of Chekhov's play Three Sisters at Nationaltheatret.

Cultural offices
Preceded by Ingjerd Egeberg	Director of the Rogaland Teater; 2005–2008	Succeeded by Arne Nøst
Preceded by Eirik Stubø	Director of the National Theatre; 2009–2020	Succeeded by Kristian Seltun
