= Loevinger =

Loevinger is a Jewish surname. Notable people with the surname include:

- Jane Loevinger (1918–2008), American psychologist
- Lee Loevinger (1913–2004), American jurist and lawyer

== See also ==
- Levinger
- Loevinger's stages of ego development
