= Sverre Rødahl =

Norwegian stage producer and theatre director

- Born: 7 July 1950 (age 76); Oslo, Norway
- Occupation: Theatre director

Sverre Rødahl (born 7 July 1950, in Oslo) is a Norwegian stage producer and theatre director.

He studied French, Sociology and Nordic language and literature at the University of Oslo and became cand. mag. in 1975. In 1979 he was admitted among the first four students in directing at the National National Academy of Theatre (Statens Teaterskole) in Oslo, where he graduated in 1982. He started his career as a director at Trøndelag Teater in Trondheim in 1982-1984. He was a freelance theatre director until 1988, then employed as a theatre director at the Norwegian Natioanal Theatre (Nationaltheatret) until 1991. From 1988 to 1990 he was artistic director of the National Theatre, together with Ellen Horn and Ole-Jørgen Nilsen. He was head of the Norwegian National Academy of Theatre from 1992 to 1996. Sverre Rødahl has directed a vast variety of theatre performances in all the major theaters in Norway, working with both modern and classical plays, and in radio.

Sverre Rødahl moved to Denmark in 1998. He was the General Secretary of the Theatre and dance committee under The Nordic Council of Ministers (Nordisk center for Scenekunst) from 1998-2003. He was head of the Danish National School of Theatre and Contemporary Dance from 2003 to 2016.

Cultural offices
Preceded by Kjetil Bang-Hansen	Director of the National Theatre (with Ellen Horn and Ole-Jørgen Nilsen); 1988–1990	Succeeded by Stein Winge
Preceded by	Director of the Danish National School of Theatre and Contemporary Dance; 2003– 2016	Succeeded by
