= Bore Church =

Church in Rogaland, Norway

- Bore kyrkje
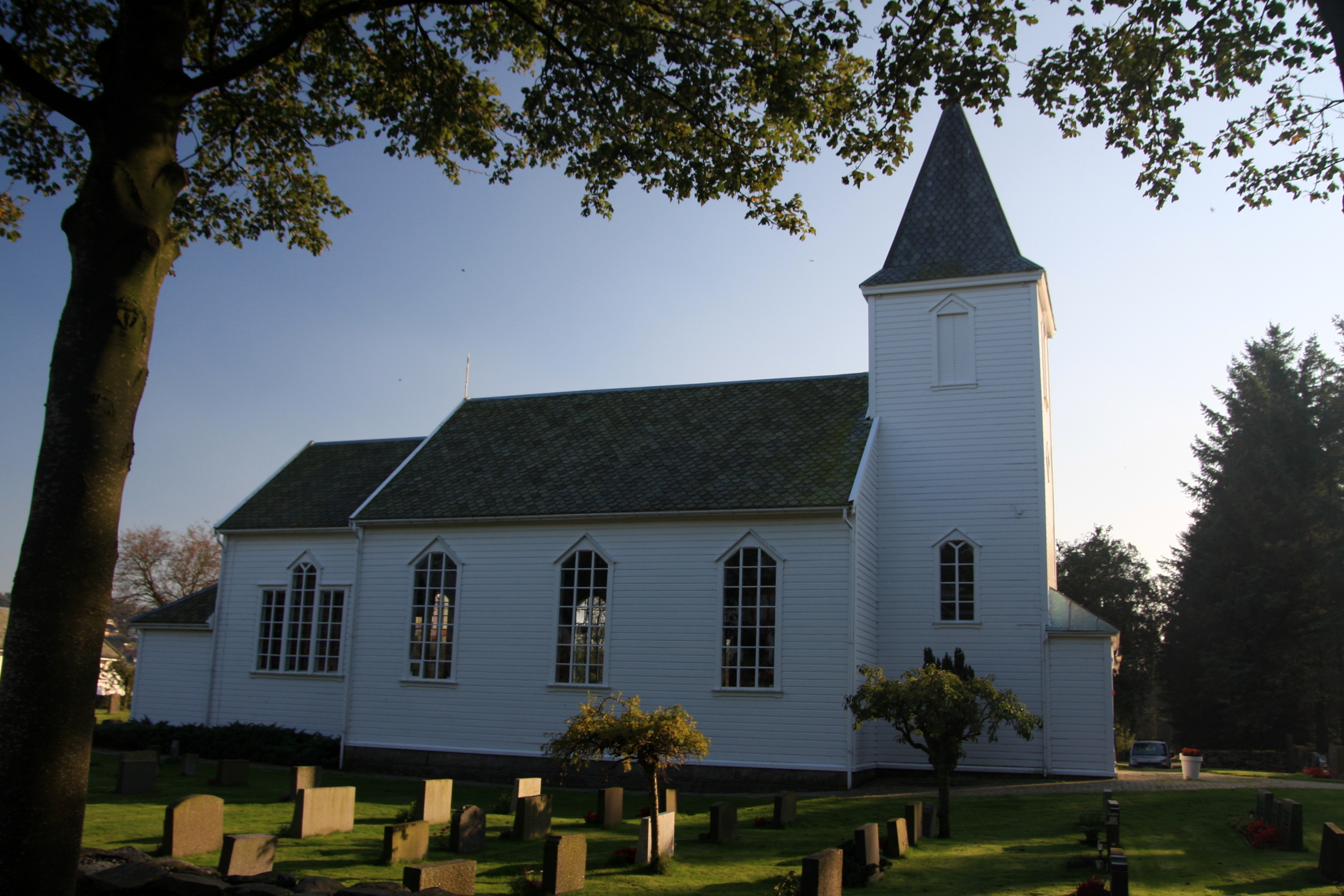
- View of the church
- Bore Church
- 58.794956°N 05.598738°E
- Location: Klepp Municipality, Rogaland
- Country: Norway
- Denomination: Church of Norway
- Churchmanship: Evangelical Lutheran

History
- Status: Parish church
- Founded: 12th century

Architecture
- Functional status: Active
- Architect: Hartvig Sverdrup Eckhoff
- Architectural type: Long church
- Completed: 1891 (135 years ago)

Specifications
- Capacity: 165
- Materials: Wood

Administration
- Diocese: Stavanger bispedømme
- Deanery: Jæren prosti
- Parish: Bore
- Norwegian Cultural Heritage Site
- Type: Church
- Status: Listed
- ID: 83925

Bore Church (Norwegian: Bore kyrkje) is a parish church of the Church of Norway in Klepp Municipality in Rogaland county, Norway. It is located in the village of Bore. It is the church for the Bore parish which is part of the Jæren prosti (deanery) in the Diocese of Stavanger. The white, wooden church was built in a long church style in 1891 using designs by the architect Hartvig Sverdrup Eckhoff. The church seats about 165 people.

== History ==
The earliest existing historical records of the church date back to the year 1322, but the church was not new at that time. It was likely built towards the end of the 12th-century as there is a preserved baptismal font from that time that is still in existence. The first church was a stave church that was located about 1.5 kilometres (0.93 mi) southwest of the present site of the church. In 1640, the church was torn down and replaced with a timber-framed long church. In 1895, a new church and cemetery was constructed about 1.5 kilometres (0.93 mi) to the northeast. After the new church was completed, the old church was torn down and its cemetery was closed.

== Media gallery ==
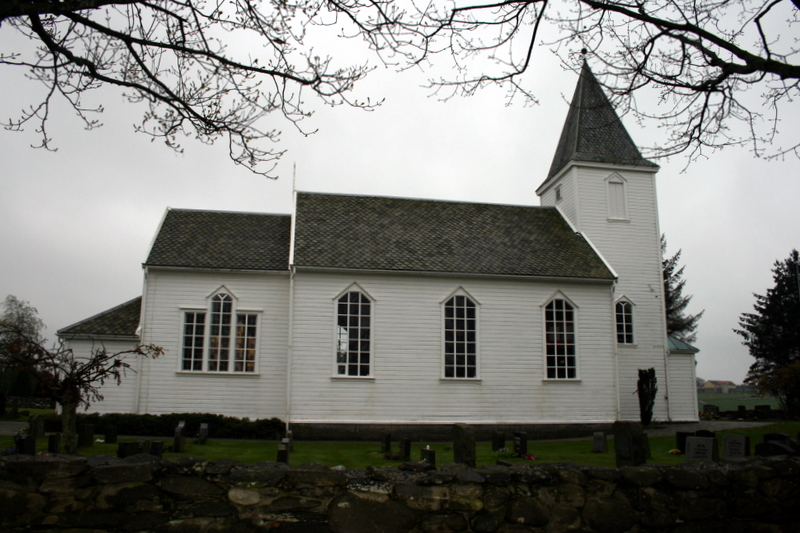
Side view

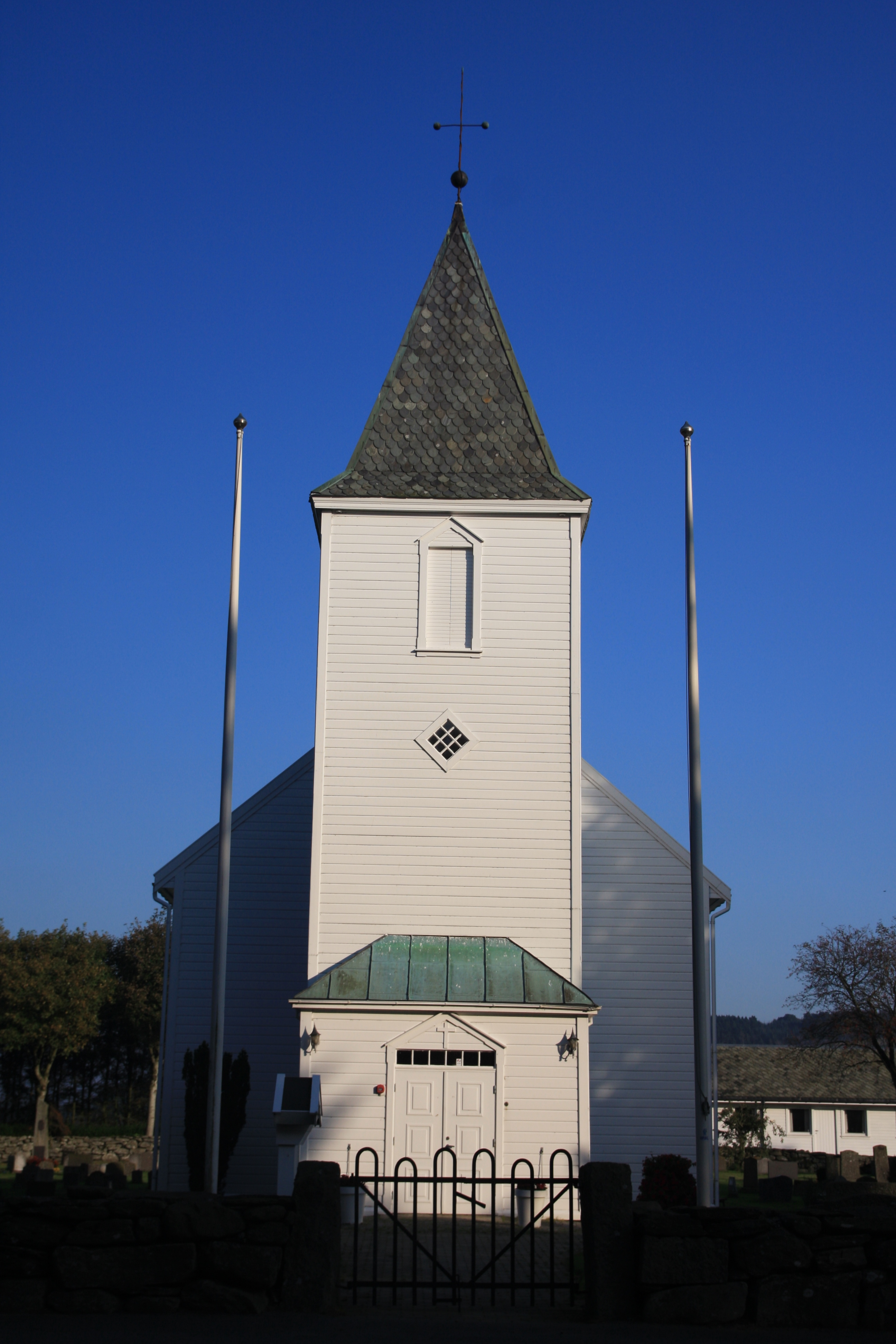
Front entrance

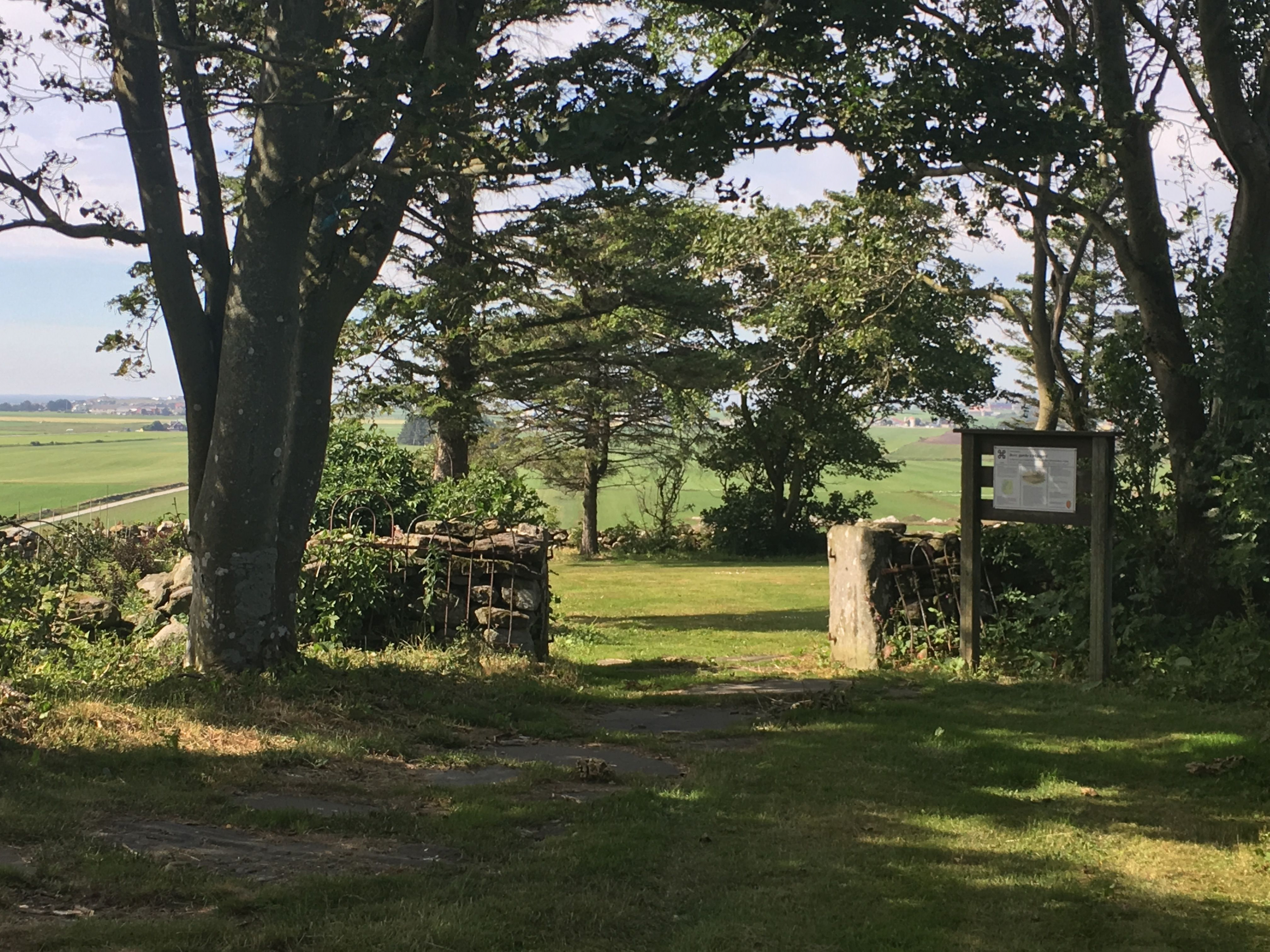
Old site of the church (prior to 1895)

== See also ==
- List of churches in Rogaland
