= Ask Church =

Church in Vestland, Norway

- Ask kirke
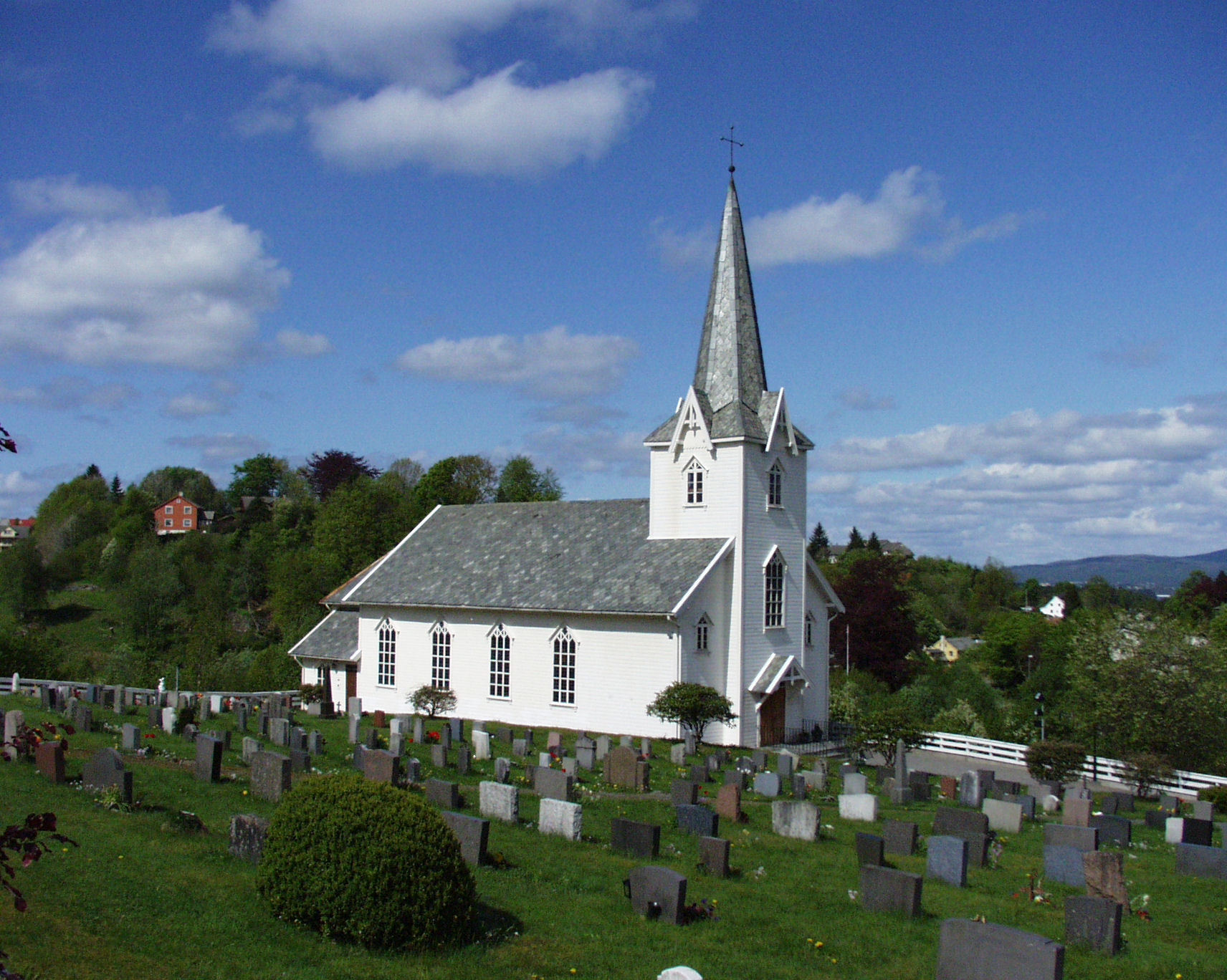
- View of the church
- Ask Church
- 60°28′37″N 5°12′45″E
- Location: Askøy Municipality, Vestland
- Country: Norway
- Denomination: Church of Norway
- Previous denomination: Catholic Church
- Churchmanship: Evangelical Lutheran

History
- Status: Parish church
- Founded: 12th century
- Consecrated: 8 Oct 1908

Architecture
- Functional status: Active
- Architect: Hartvig Sverdrup Eckhoff
- Architectural type: Long church
- Completed: 1908 (118 years ago)
- Closed: 1741-1908

Specifications
- Capacity: 275
- Materials: Wood

Administration
- Diocese: Bjørgvin bispedømme
- Deanery: Vesthordland prosti
- Parish: Ask
- Norwegian Cultural Heritage Site
- Type: Church
- Status: Not protected
- ID: 83798

Ask Church (Norwegian: Ask kirke) is a parish church of the Church of Norway in Askøy Municipality in Vestland county, Norway. It is located in the village of Ask, on the eastern coast of the island of Askøy. It is the church for the Ask parish which is part of the Vesthordland prosti (deanery) in the Diocese of Bjørgvin. The white, wooden church was built in a long church design in 1908 using plans drawn up by the architect Hartvig Sverdrup Eckhoff. The church seats about 275 people.

== History ==
The earliest existing historical records of the church date back to the year 1320, but it was not new that year. The first church at Ask was likely a wooden church that was possibly built during the 12th century. The exact church site is not known, but there is a stone cross memorial on a site where it possibly was located, about 900 metres (3,000 ft) north of the present church site. The church was made an annex chapel to the Bergen Cathedral parish starting at the Reformation. Because of this, there was no resident priest at Ask, and residents had to go across the Byfjorden to the city of Bergen to get to the main church. The residents of Askøy petitioned the King for their own parish for many years and it was not until 1740 when a rich merchant named Henrik Schreuder offered to pay for a new church. Instead of building a new church at Ask, however, the new church was built in the village of Strusshamn, in a location that was more centrally located in the parish. In 1741, the new Strusshamn Church was built on the southern shore of the island and the old Ask Church was torn down.

In the late 19th century, the people of the village of Ask were tired of the 12-kilometre (7.5 mi) long journey to the other side of the island to get to the church and so they began asking for a church of their own. Eventually, the new Ask Church was approved and it was built in 1908 using designs by the architect Hartvig Sverdrup Eckhoff. Torjus Tengesdal was the lead builder of the new church. The new church was consecrated on 8 October 1908 by the Bishop Johan Willoch Erichsen. The church cost a total of 20,000 kr and was built with a lot of volunteer labor. After its completion, it was made a chapel under the Strusshamn Church parish. In 1954-1955, the church was renovated according to plans by Torgeir Alvsaker. In 1987, the church porch was enlarged.

== Media gallery ==
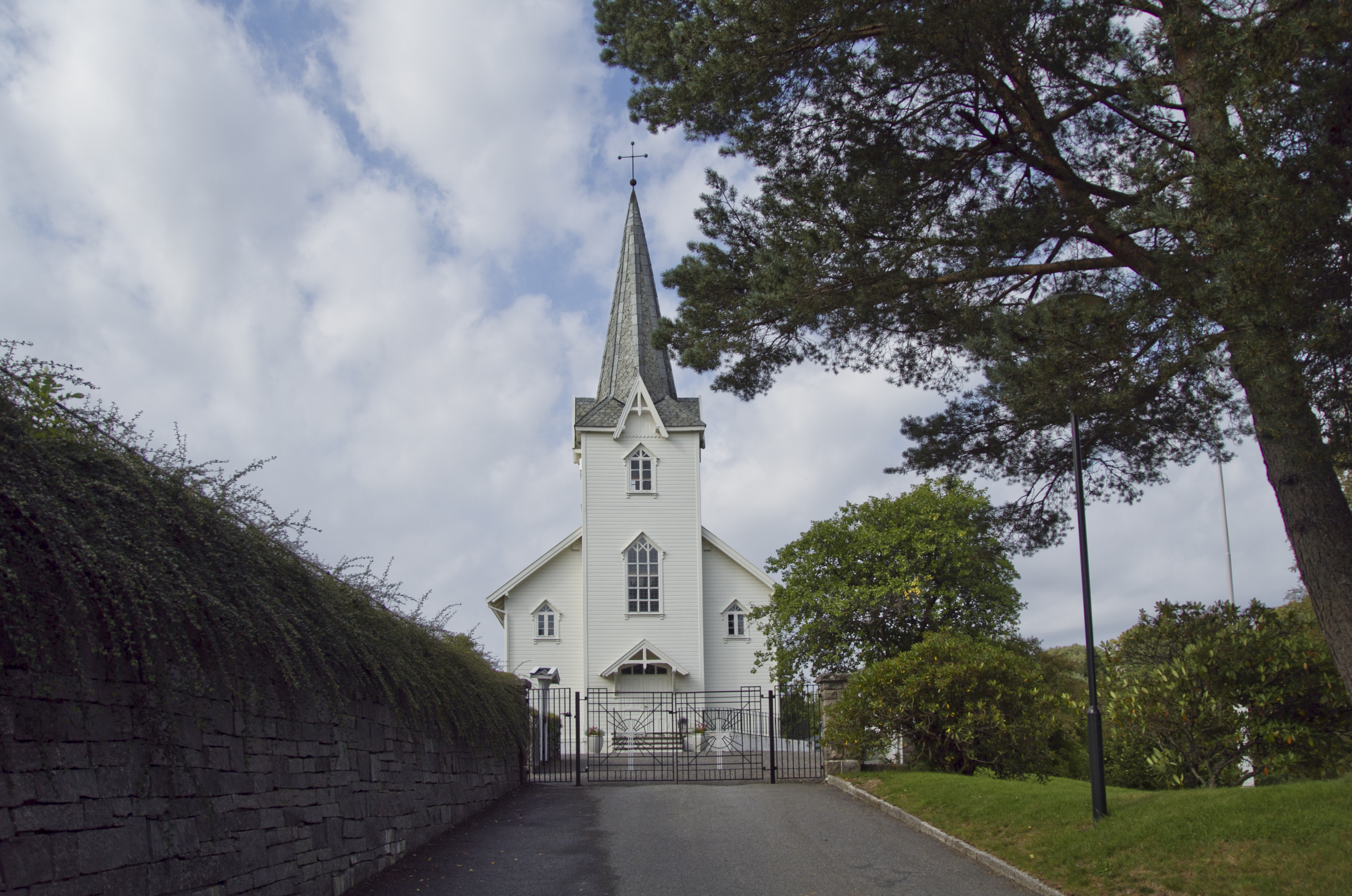

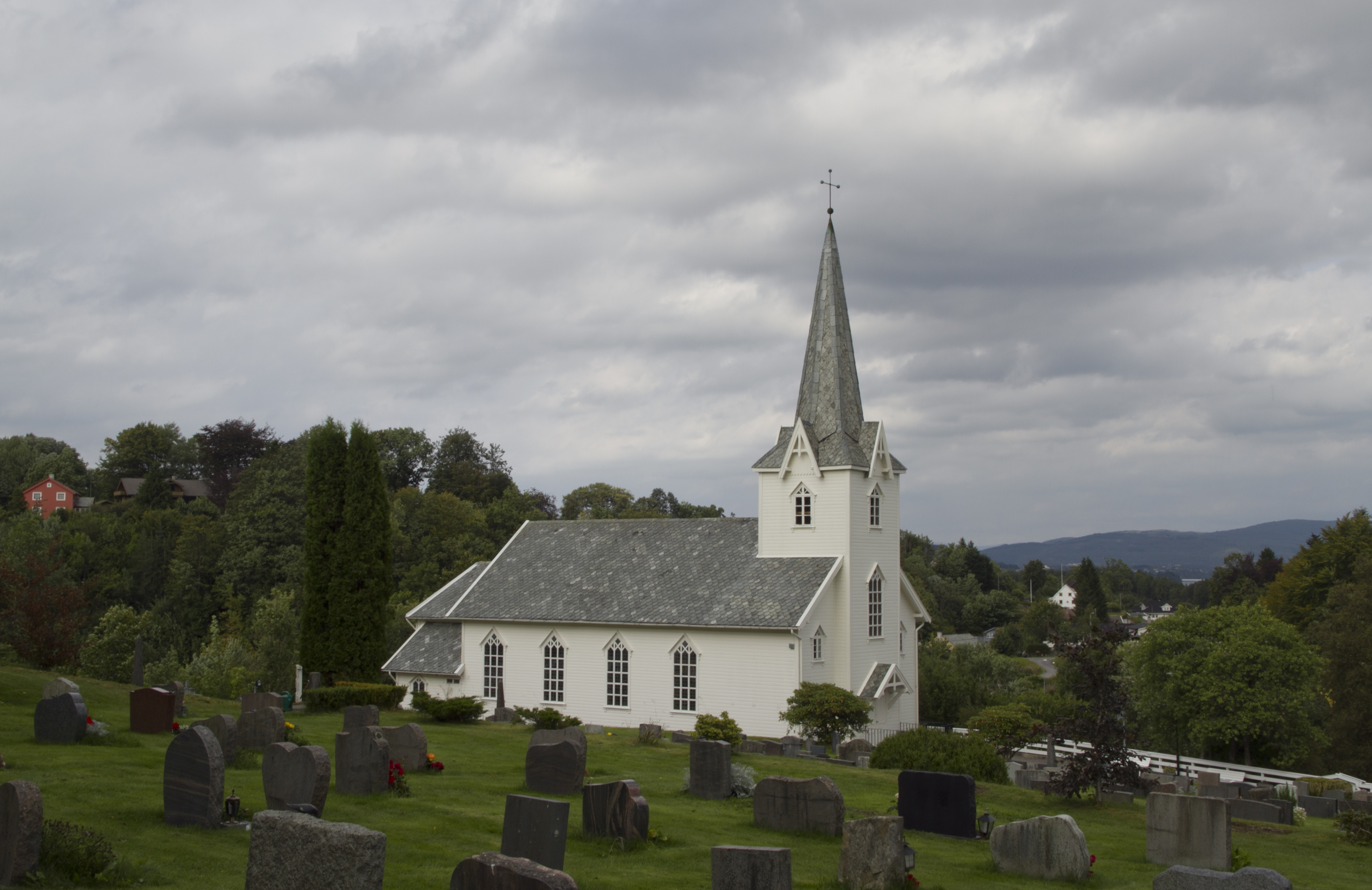

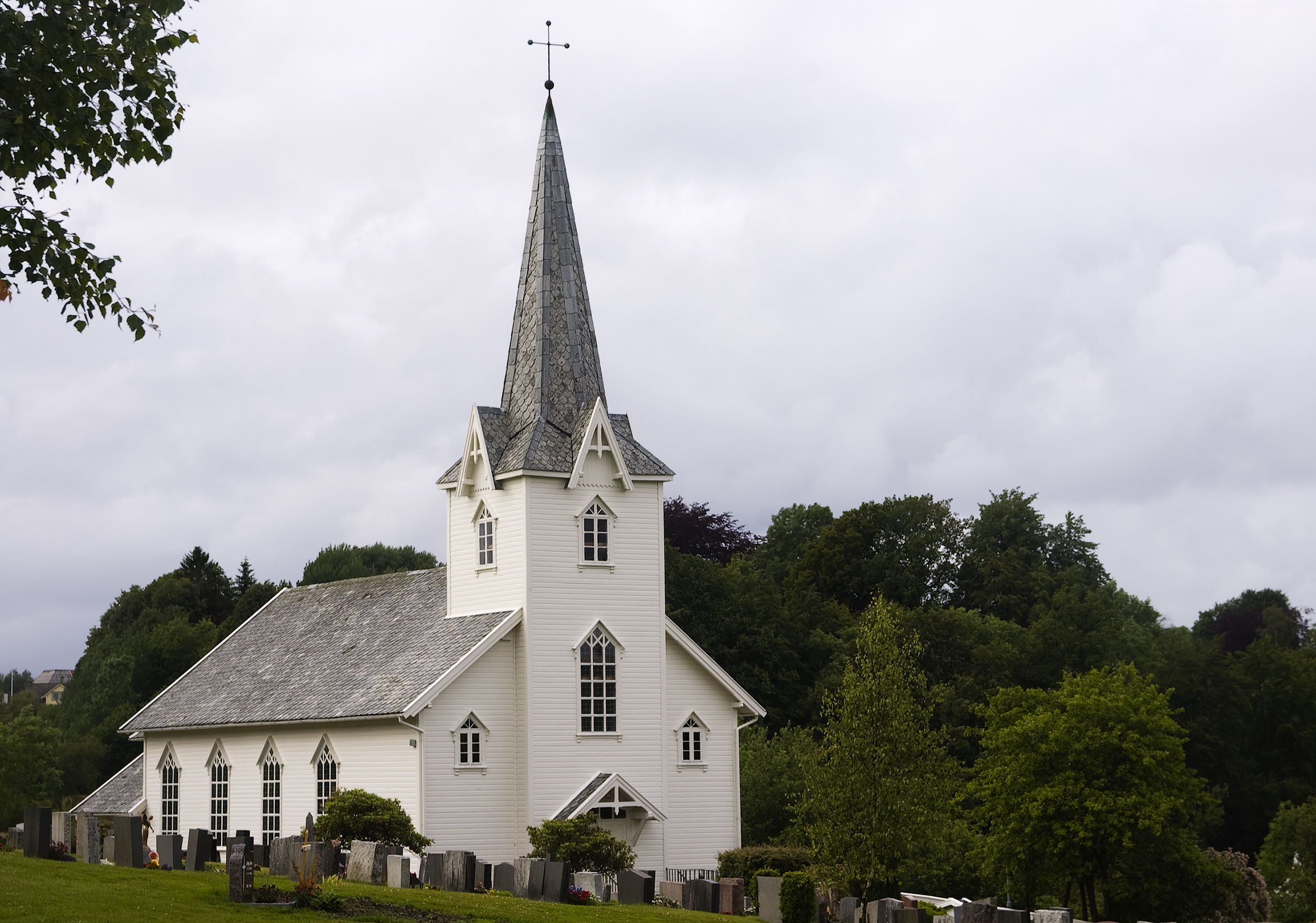

== See also ==
- List of churches in Bjørgvin
