= Matthew Levinger =

American historian (born 1960)

Matthew Levinger (born 1960) is an American historian. He is Research Professor of International Affairs and Director of the National Security Studies Program at the George Washington University Elliott School of International Affairs.

Levinger received a B.A. (1983) from Haverford College and an M.A. and Ph.D. (1992) in History from the University of Chicago. He taught at the Hackley School in Tarrytown, NY (1983–85) and was lecturer at Stanford University (1991–94). He was Assistant (1994-2000) and Associate (2000-2005) Professor of History at Lewis & Clark College in Portland, Oregon. His research and teaching have focused on the history of nationalism and revolutionary political theory in modern Europe, as well as the history of genocide during the twentieth century.

He is the author of Conflict Analysis: Understanding Causes, Unlocking Solutions (USIP, 2013), Enlightened Nationalism: The Transformation of Prussian Political Culture, 1806-1848 (Oxford, 2000) and coauthor of The Revolutionary Era, 1789-1850 (Norton, 2002).

From January 2003 to January 2004, he was a William C. Foster Fellow at the U.S. Department of State, where he worked on initiatives for atrocities early warning and prevention in the Bureau of Political-Military Affairs and the Bureau of Intelligence and Research.

In 2004–2005, he worked as a consultant for the U.S. Holocaust Memorial Museum, developing plans for the Academy for Genocide Prevention. From 2005 to 2007, Levinger served as director of the Academy for Genocide Prevention at the U.S. Holocaust Memorial Museum from 2005 to 2007. During this time he played a key role in launching the Genocide Prevention Task Force, co-chaired by former Secretary of State Madeleine Albright and former Secretary of Defense William Cohen. In December 2008 the Task Force released a report entitled "Preventing Genocide: A Blueprint for U.S. Policymakers."

From 2008 to 2012 he was Senior Program Officer at the United States Institute of Peace.

== See also ==
- Genocide
- Holocaust
