= Hartvig Sverdrup Eckhoff =

Norwegian architect (1855–1928)

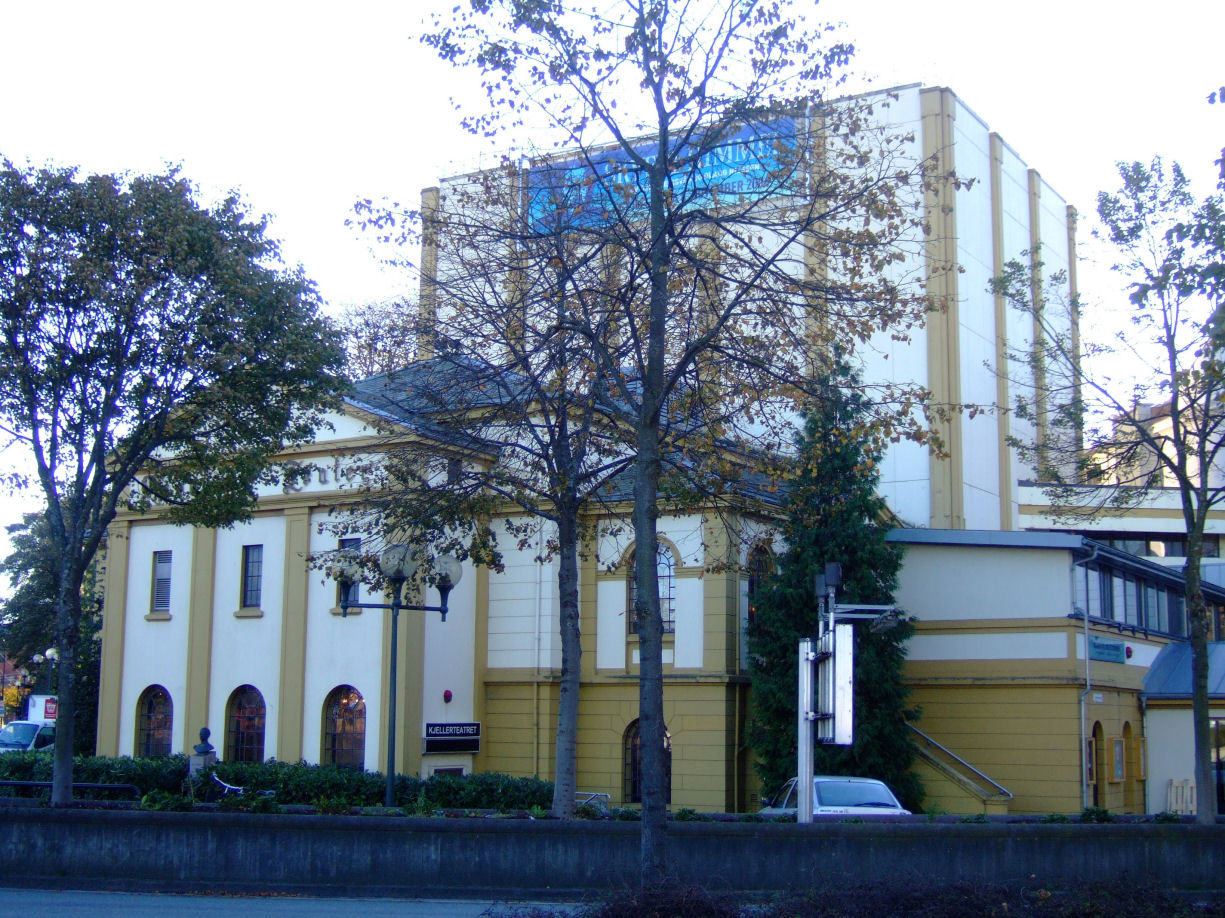
Rogaland Teater.

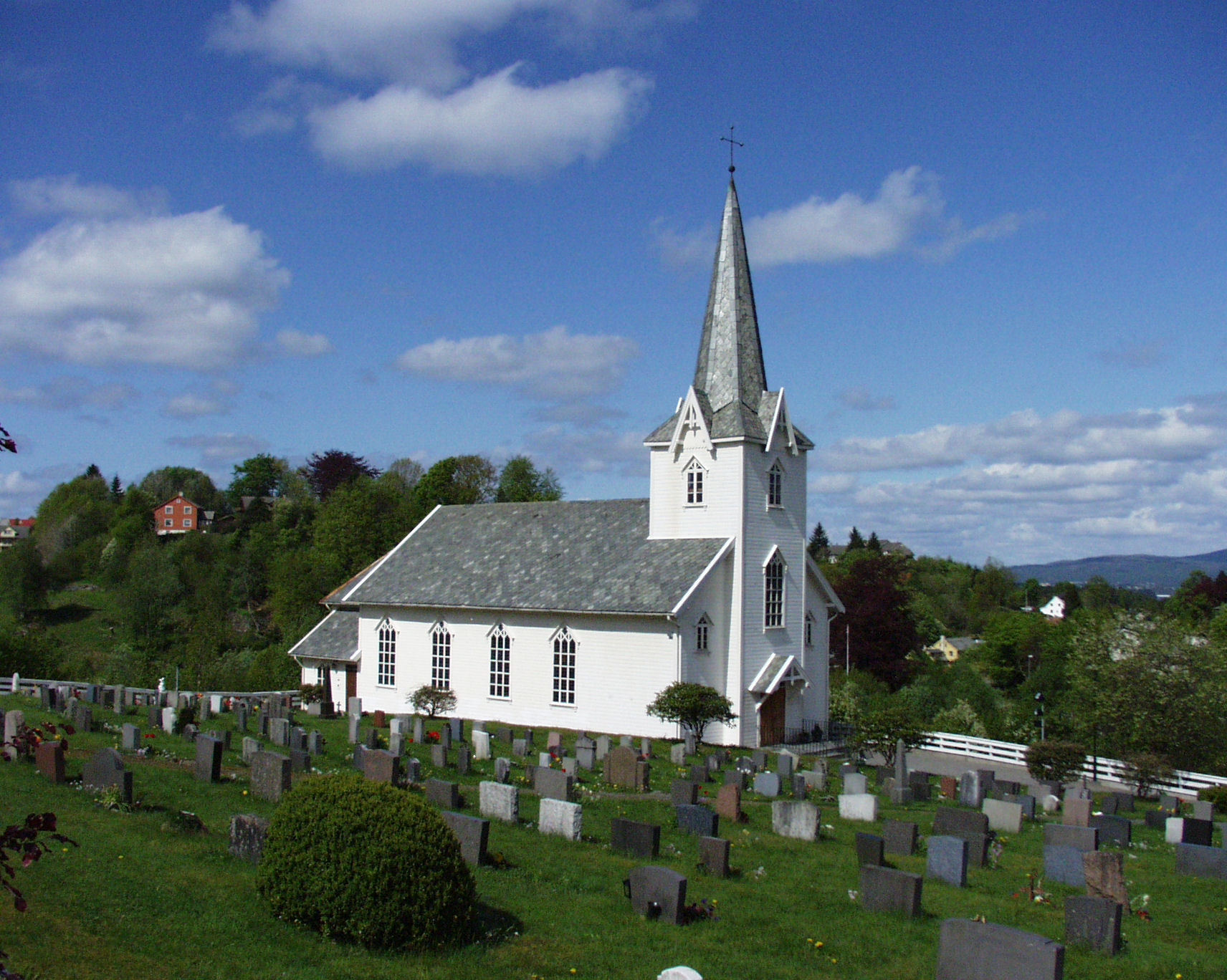
Ask Church in Askøy Municipality.

Hartvig Sverdrup Eckhoff (30 December 1855 – 17 February 1928) was a Norwegian architect.

He took his education at the Technical University of Munich, and opened an architect's office in Stavanger in 1881. He was assigned to design several important city buildings; the first was Rogaland Teater, erected in 1883. He later designed the Stavanger Gymnastics Association (1891), Stavanger Museum (1893) and Stavanger Hospital (1897). All these buildings are characterized by historicism, Neo-Renaissance architectural revival style, the latter with a different expression, performed mostly in raw red brick. Eckhoff designed several villas in western Norway, and distinguished himself as a church architect. His designs included Haukedalen Church in Førde Municipality (1885), Bore Church in Klepp Municipality (1891), Skånevik Church in Skånevik Municipality (1900), and Ask Church in Askøy Municipality (1908). Besides his architect work, he was a teacher at Stavanger Cathedral School for thirty-three years.
