= Gustav Wilhelm Selmer =

Norwegian-Danish actor manager

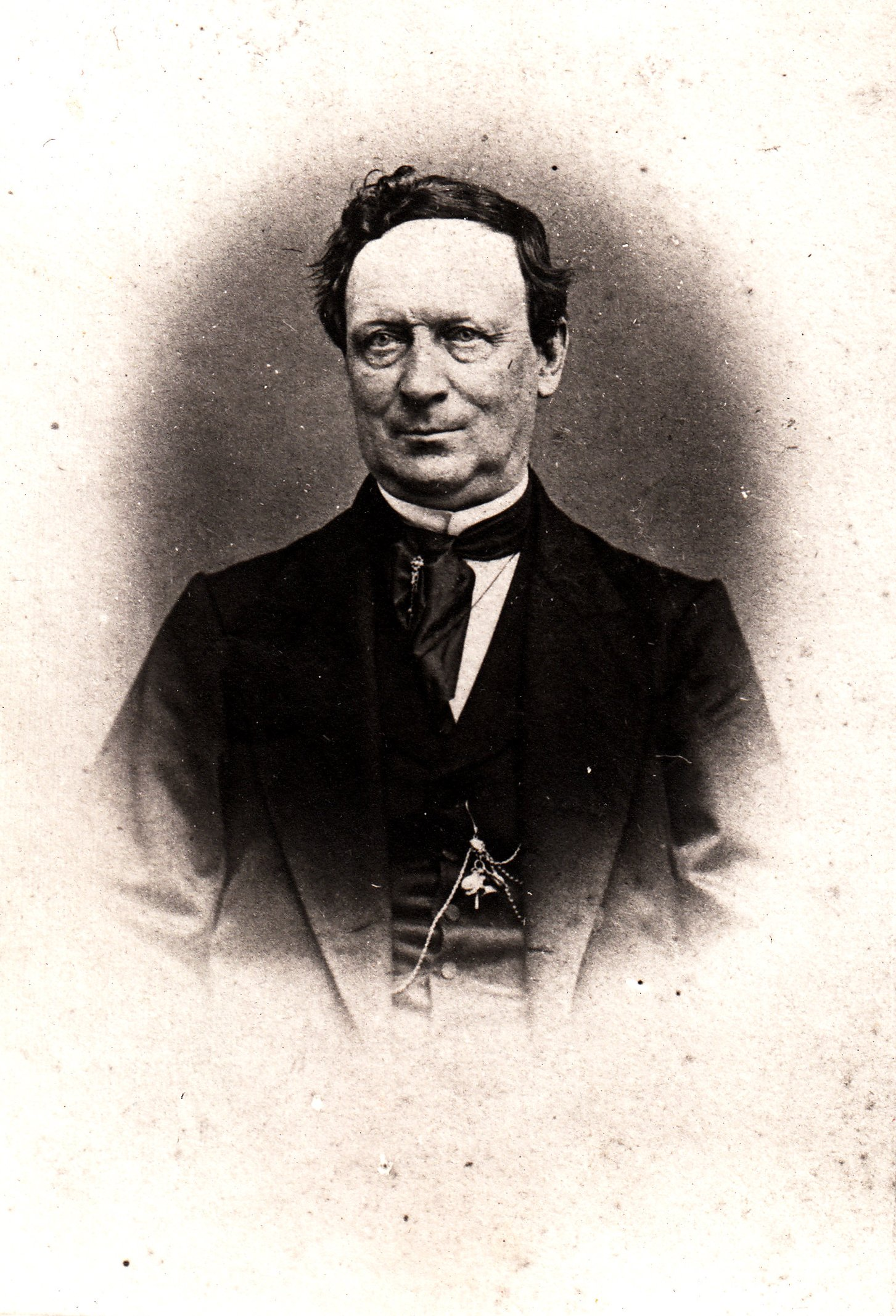

Gustav Wilhelm Selmer (1814–1875) was a Norwegian-Danish actor manager.

He succeeded Jacob Mayson as the manager of the theater company which staffed the Trøndelag Teater in 1839–1848. As such, he played a major part in the theater history of Trondheim, which had no other permanent theatre in a period when Norway was almost entirely dominated by travelling theatre companies from Denmark. Many major figures of the contemporary Norwegian theatre was employed in his company. He also made successful tours around Norway.

He married Marie-Caroline Bergstrøm (1822–1854). His son Albert Cato Fougner (1845–1923) moved to the United States, and his grandson Gustav Selmer Fougner (1885 in Chicago – 1941 in New York City) was a reporter and wine and restaurant critic.
