= Jacob Mayson =

Norwegian-Danish actor manager (1808–1881)

Jacob Mayson (1808–1881) was a Norwegian-Danish actor manager.

He succeeded Carl Wilhelm Orlamundt as the manager of the theater company which staffed the Trøndelag Teater from 1836 to 1839, and was succeeded by Gustav Wilhelm Selmer. As such he played a major part in the theater history of Trondheim, which had no other permanent theatre in a period when Norway was almost entirely dominated by travelling theatre companies from Denmark. Many major figures of the contemporary Norwegian theatre was employed in his company.
