= Erik Tandberg =

Norwegian bobsledder

Erik Tandberg (August 28, 1913 – January 22, 1964 in Oslo) was a Norwegian bobsledder who competed in the early 1950s. At the 1952 Winter Olympics in Oslo, he finished 14th in the two-man event.
