= Ola B. Johannessen =

Norwegian theatre director

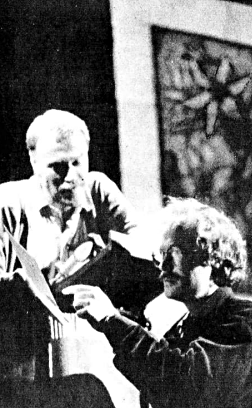
- Johannessen (left) with Knut Ødegård
- Born: 17 May 1939 (age 86); Trondheim, Norway
- Occupations: Actor, stage producer and theatre director

Ola Bjørnssønn Johannessen (born 17 May 1939) is a Norwegian actor, stage producer and theatre director.

He was born in Trondheim to Bjørn Elness Johannessen and Aasta Barbara Sivertsen, and married actress Marit Olaug Østbye in 1974. He made his stage debut at Det Norske Teatret in 1961, and worked at this theatre from 1962 to 1970. He served as theatre director at Trøndelag Teater from 1979 to 1984, at Rogaland Teater from 1994 to 1997, and again at Trøndelag Teater from 1997 to 2000.

Cultural offices
Preceded by Kjell Stormoen	Director of the Trøndelag Teater; 1979-1984	Succeeded by Otto Homlung
Preceded by Ketil Egge	Director of the Rogaland Teater; 1994–1997	Succeeded by Eirik Stubø
Preceded by Terje Mærli	Director of the Trøndelag Teater; 1997-2000	Succeeded by Catrine Telle
