= Levanger =

Levanger may refer to:

== Places ==
- Levanger Municipality, a municipality in Trøndelag county, Norway
- Levanger (town), a town within Levanger Municipality in Trøndelag county, Norway
- Levanger landsogn, a former municipality (1856–1962) in Trøndelag county, Norway
- Levanger Church, a church in Levanger Municipality in Trøndelag county, Norway
- Levanger Hospital, a hospital serving the Innherred region of Trøndelag county, Norway
- Levanger Station, a railway station in Trøndelag county, Norway
- Levanger, a dialect-specific name for the locality of Lövånger in Skellefteå Municipality, Västerbotten County, Sweden

== Other ==
- Levanger FK, a Norwegian football club located in Levanger, Norway
- Levanger-Avisa, a newspaper serving the Levanger area in Trøndelag county, Norway

== See also ==
- Levinger (disambiguation)
