= The Respectful Prostitute =

1947 play written by Jean-Paul Sartre

La Putain respectueuse
- Author: Jean-Paul Sartre
- Language: French
- Genre: Drama
- Published: 1947 (french)
- Publisher: Éditions Gallimard
- Publication place: France
- ISBN: 978-3-15-019825-4

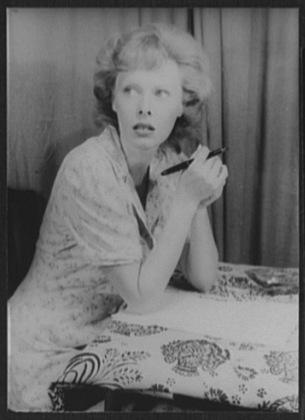
Meg Mundy won a Theatre World Award for her performance in the play at the Cort Theatre in 1948.

The Respectful Prostitute (French: La Putain respectueuse) is a French play by Jean-Paul Sartre, written in 1946, which observes a white woman, a prostitute, caught up in a racially tense period of American history. The audience understands that there has been an incident on a train with said woman involved, but also a black man on whom the blame is laid by the prejudiced law enforcers. What comes to the viewer's realisation is that a white man instigated an attack, but it is in the interests of the law to preserve the perception of the white person at the expense of the black "devil".

The tale takes a brief look at the loss of freedom inside a cruel world, a subject that dominates Sartre's literary career. The play premiered in November 1946 at the Théâtre Antoine-Simone Berriau in Paris. When the play was produced in the United States, Sartre was accused of anti-Americanism.

According to his partner Simone de Beauvoir, Sartre wrote the piece in only a few days to fill an entire evening at the theatre, because Morts sans sépulture alone was too short.

Sartre's play is believed to have been based on the infamous Scottsboro case, in which two white prostitutes accused nine black teenagers of rape on a train traveling through Alabama in 1931.

The play was adapted in the film twice: La Putain respectueuse (1952) directed by Marcello Pagliero and Den respektfulla skökan (1960) directed by Hans Abramson.

== Characters ==
Lizzie — A white woman. She is a prostitute. While she does not wish to testify against the Negro in court, she is manipulated by the Senator into signing an accusation. She wears a snake charm bracelet.

The Negro — A black man who is described as "tall" and "strapping" with white hair. He is married and has children. He is on the run because he has been accused of raping Lizzie.

Fred Clarke — A wealthy white man. The Senator's son. He asks Lizzie to testify against the Negro and accuse him of raping her, so that his cousin, Thomas, will not go to jail for shooting the black man who was with the Negro.

The Senator — Fred Clarke's father. He manipulates Lizzie into signing the accusation.

Thomas — Fred Clarke's cousin. He killed the black man who was with the Negro.

John and James — Two policemen, that also try to pressure Lizzie into signing the accusation.

== Plot summary ==
=== Setting ===
Lizzie moves to the south of the United States. She is on a train when four white men harass her. Two black men defend her, and a fight ensues. In the fight, Thomas kills the black man that was with The Negro. He is arrested. He is a nephew of the rich Senator Clarke. The Negro escapes, and the other white men spread the rumour that he had raped Lizzie, so that Thomas shooting the other black man would become acceptable.

=== The first act ===
==== Scene I ====
The Negro knocks at Lizzie's door. He says that the Whites are chasing him. He asks her to testify for him that he did not harm her in front of the judge, because the Whites want to charge him in court. She refuses to go to the police, but agrees that if they force her to testify, she will tell the truth, but when he tries to hide in her house, she sends him away.

==== Scene II ====
Fred, Lizzie's client from last night, comes out of the bathroom. He is the senator's son. During the scene, he directs the conversation towards the incident on the train. He tries in many different ways to get Lizzie to go to the police and testify against The Negro, but Lizzie says no to everything and refuses to falsely testify that the black man raped her, when in reality, she was being harassed by white men on the train and the black men defended her. At the end of the scene, the voice of a police officer is heard. The police officer enters Lizzie's house with his colleague.

==== Scene III ====
Scene III features John and James, the two policemen who were previously only heard speaking from offstage. They know and like Fred, and are also racists. They also try to convince Lizzie to testify against The Negro. When the three men present Lizzie with a document that would prove the rape allegations with Lizzie's signature, she again says no.

==== Scene IV ====
In scene IV, the senator himself goes to Lizzie's house. He is a good speaker, and he knows how to talk to voters. He gains Lizzie's trust during the scene, and at the end he gives her a choice. Either The Negro, who "hangs around, robs and sings" or Thomas, "an officer, Harvard student and good American". While she is still reluctant, the senator takes Lizzie's hand and forces her to sign. Lizzie immediately realizes her mistake and tries to call the senator back. However, the senator has already disappeared and does not listen to Lizzie.

=== The second act ===
The second act takes place 12 hours later, also at Lizzie's house. During this time The Negro has jumped through one of her windows and is hiding behind a curtain.

==== Scene I ====
On the same evening, the senator visits Lizzie. He gives her a $100 reward for her testimony. As for The Negro, he is wanted by a white lynchmob, who are searching for him in every house.

==== Scene II ====
The Negro comes out of hiding and asks Lizzie, who is shocked to see him, to help hide him. Lizzie gives him a revolver, but he states that he doesn't want to use it on the mob, so the revolver is relatively useless to him. There are then noises from the street, as the mob is coming closer. The Negro hides in the bathroom when there is a knock at the door.

==== Scene III ====
Scene III is very short. Lizzie explains to the men knocking on the door that she has not hidden The Negro, because she was raped by him. The men believe it and leave.

==== Scene IV ====
In scene IV, The Negro comes out of hiding again. They talk briefly about the differences between black and white people, during which Lizzie also sees similarities between her and The Negro. Then there is another knock on the door and The Negro hides for the third time.

==== Scene V ====
Lizzie opens the door and Fred comes in. During the conversation, Fred hears a noise from the bathroom. Lizzie tries to convince him that it is her next client, but Fred doesn't believe her and goes to check. He finds The Negro, who immediately runs away from him and out into the street. Lizzie runs after him and shouts that he is innocent, but two shots are fired. She is very angry and is about to kill Fred, however, Fred, just like his father, is a very good speaker and manages to convince her not to.

== Themes ==
The Respectful Prostitute explores the theme of racism in the American South in the 1940s.

It also touches on themes of class struggle, oppression and social conflict.

== Sources ==
- TeacherWeb. 'No Exit' and three other plays by Jen-Paul Sartre (full text):

No Exit (Huis Clos)
The Flies (Les Mouches)
Dirty Hands (Les Mains sales)
The Respectful Prostitute (La Putain respectueuse)

- The Respectful Prostitute, in Jean-Paul Sartre, No Exit and Three Other Plays (1955) (Internet Book List)
- "New Play in Manhattan," Time, April 5, 1948
