= Rogaland Teater =

Theatre in Stavanger, Norway

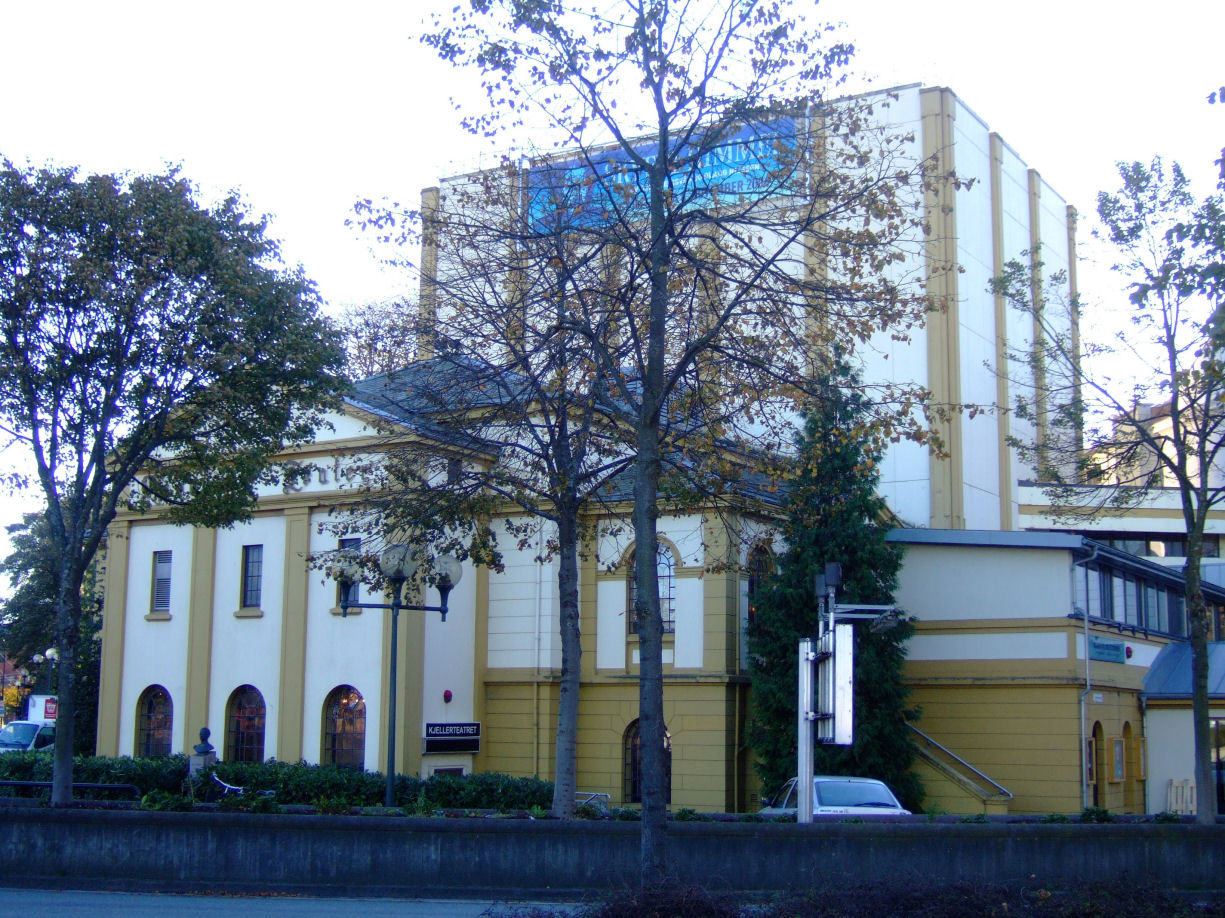
- Interactive map of Rogaland Teater
- Address: Teaterveien 1 Stavanger; Norway
- Coordinates: 58°57′56″N 5°43′58″E
- Type: Theatre

Construction
- Built: 1883; 143 years ago
- Opened: 9 September 1947; 78 years ago
- Years active: 1947–present
- Architect: Hartvig Sverdrup Eckhoff

Website
- rogaland-teater.no/forside

Rogaland Teater is a theatre in Stavanger, Norway. The building was constructed in 1883, designed by the architect Hartvig Sverdrup Eckhoff, and it originally seated close to 500 people. The theatre was formally established in June 1947 and opened in September of that year, following financial support from the Rogaland county administration and surrounding municipalities. It has since become one of the most prominent regional theatres in Norway, having hosted a succession of notable directors and productions, and its staff and performers have received multiple Hedda Awards.

== Background ==
The theatre building was built in 1883 on a parcel of Kannik prestegård. It was designed by architect Hartvig Sverdrup Eckhoff, and initially held close to 500 seats. The building housed Stavanger Faste Scene from 1914 to 1921, and Stavanger Teater from 1921 to 1926. Several changes have been made to the building over the years, including enlargements and modifications in 1951, 1974, 1980, and 2001.

Rogaland Teater opened on 9 September 1947. A working committee had been established in 1946, and after subscription for shares and financial support from Rogaland county administration and several of the municipalities in Rogaland, the theatre was established on 6 June 1947. Its first director was Øistein Børke, from 1947 to 1949. Later directors were Jens Bolling, from 1949 to 1951 and Kjell Stormoen, from 1951 to 1952. Claes Gill was theatre director from 1952 to 1956 and during his period, the venue got a new profile, with lower ticket prices and a new marketing strategy. His interpretation of Jeppe in Holberg's Jeppe på Bjerget became part of Norwegian theatre history.

Gisle Straume was theatre director from 1956 to 1958. During his tenure, the theatre staged Andreas Jacobsen's (artist name "Ajax") play De' smedle på Skansen, and Liv Ullmann had her breakthrough as Anne in Anne Franks dagbok. During Straume's leadership, the children's theatre (Norwegian: Barneteatret) was established, initiated by Bjørn Endreson, with children playing the leading roles. Bjørn Endreson was director from 1960 to 1970, and he established the small stage "Mandagsteatret", which put on plays by contemporary dramatists, such as Eugène Ionesco and Samuel Beckett, and was a forerunner of "Intimscenen" from 1974. Arne Thomas Olsen directed the theatre from 1970 to 1976.

Kjetil Bang-Hansen was director from 1976 to 1982. During this period, the venue became one of the most central theatres in Norway. His adaption of Ibsen's verse play Peer Gynt received much acclaim, and it was also played at the Belgrade International Theatre Festival, gaining Bang-Hansen international recognition. He also staged a theatre adaption of Leo Tolstoj's story "Kholstomer".

Later directors have been Alf Nordvang (1982–1986 and 1990–1991), Bentein Baardson from 1986 to 1989, Hans Rosenquist from 1989 to 1990, Ketil Egge from 1991 to 1994, Ola B. Johannessen from 1994 to 1997, Eirik Stubø from 1997 to 2000, Ingjerd Egeberg from 2000 to 2004, and Hanne Tømta from 2005 to 2008. Arne Nøst took on the role in 2008.

=== Awards ===
Actor Even Stormoen received both the Hedda Award for best stage performance and the Norwegian Critics Prize for Theatre for his role as Harpagon in Molière's Den gjerrige in 1998. The staff at Rogaland Teater received the Hedda Award in 2005 for their professional skill, while Nina Ellen Ødegård received the award for best stage performance, for her role as Josie in the play Måne for livets stebarn, also in 2005.
