= Riksteatret =

Norwegian touring theatre

Coordinates: 59°57′02″N 10°45′55″E

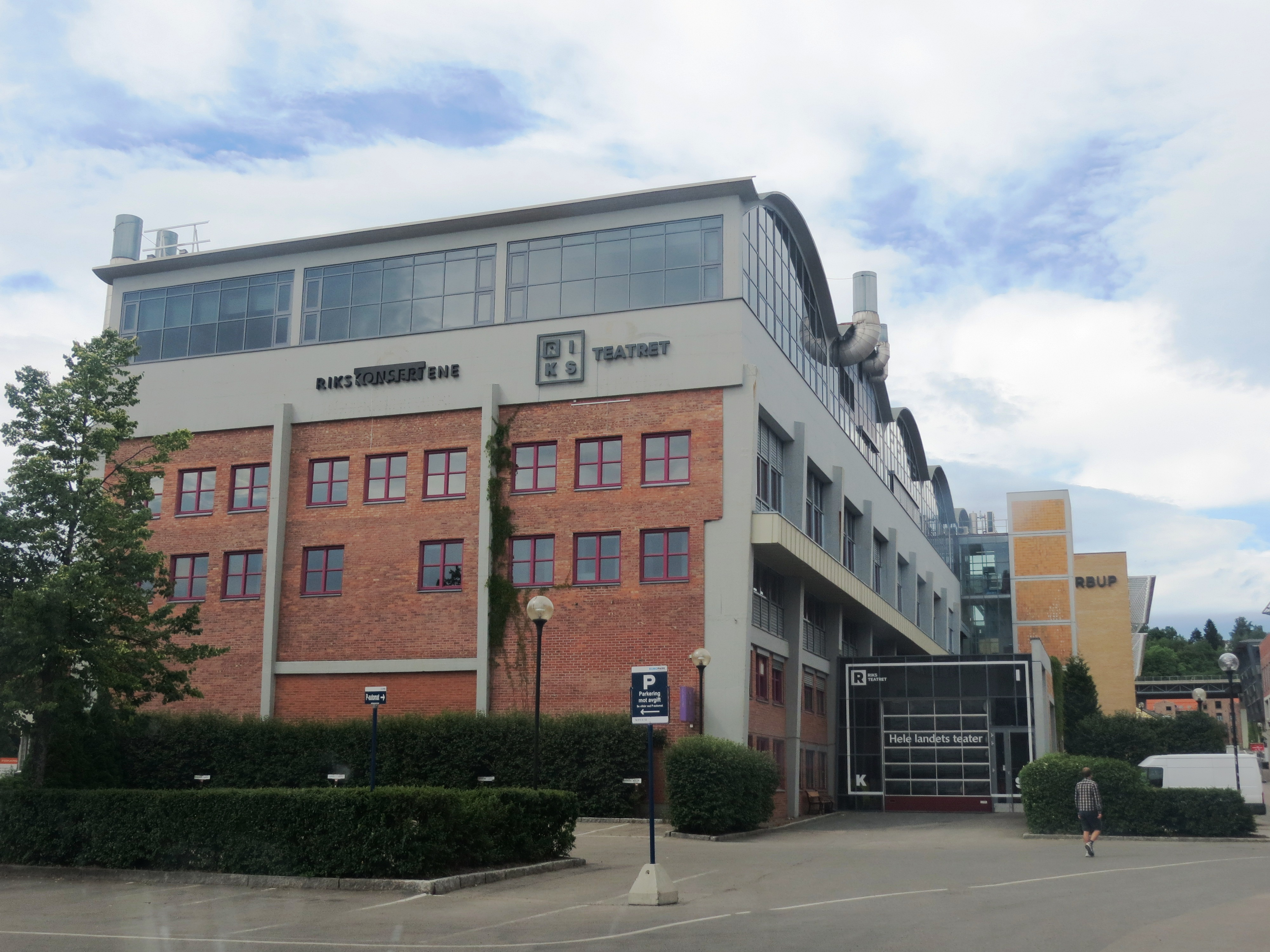
The headquarters of Riksteatret and Rikskonsertene

Riksteatret (English: National Traveling Theater) is a Norwegian touring theatre. It was established by law in 1948. Its first performance was in Kirkenes in 1949, with Sigurd Christiansen's play En reise i natten. The theatre plays on about 200 different stages throughout the country. Its first theatre director was Fritz von der Lippe, who held this position from 1949 to 1968. Ellen Horn was theatre director from 2005 to 2015, Tom Remlov from 2015 to 2020, and Arne Nøst since 2020.
