= National Theatre (Oslo) =

Theatre in Oslo, Norway

- Norwegian Cultural Heritage Site
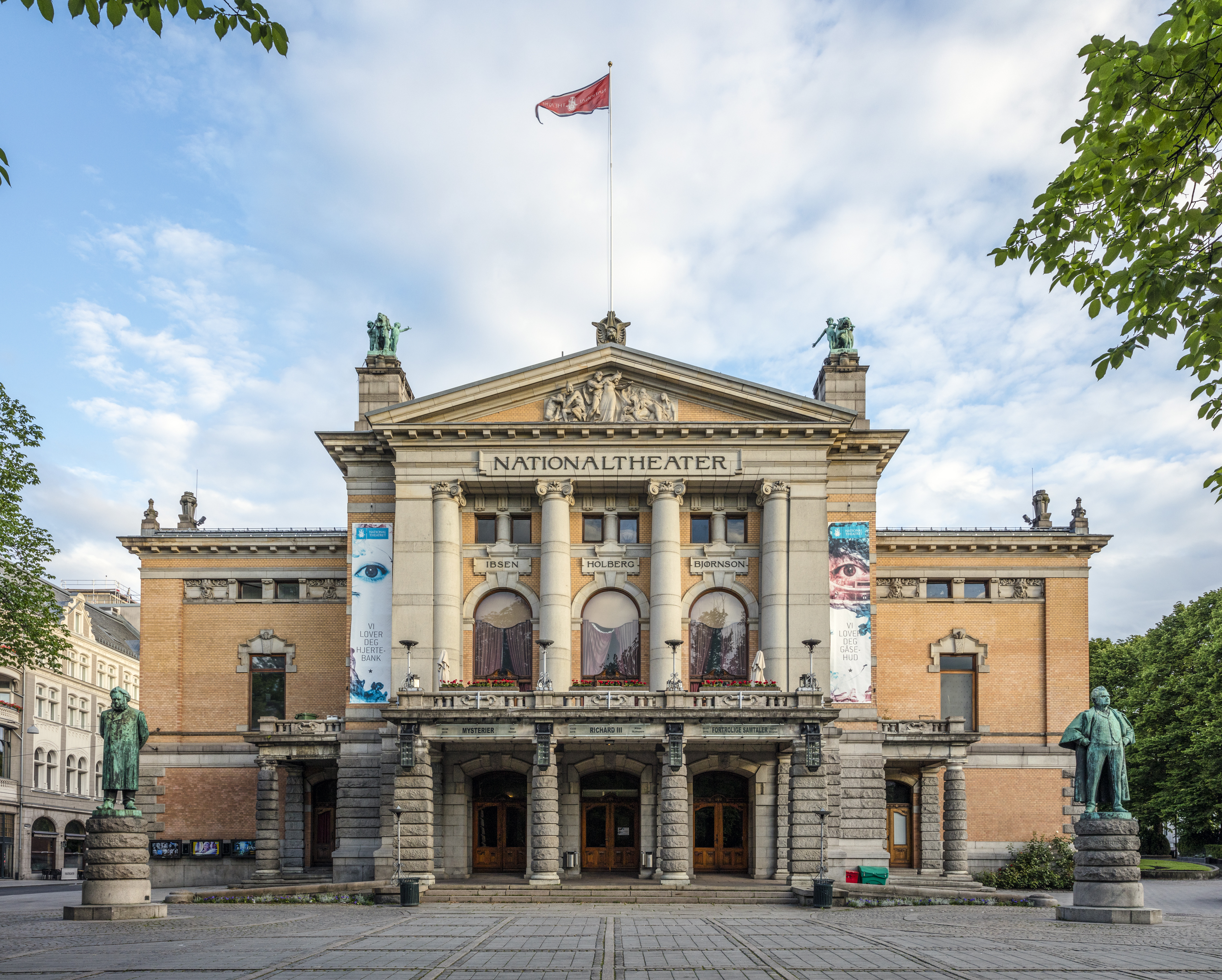
- National Theatre
- Type: Cultural institution
- Status: Protected by resolution
- County: Oslo
- Municipality: Oslo
- Coordinates: 59°54′52.1″N 10°44′3.74″E
- Year built: 1899; 127 years ago
- ID: 86156

The National Theatre in Oslo (Norwegian: Nationaltheatret) is one of Norway's largest and most prominent venues for performance of dramatic arts.

== History ==
The theatre had its first performance on 1 September 1899 but can trace its origins to Christiania Theatre, which was founded in 1829. There were three official opening performances, on subsequent days in September: first, selected pieces by Ludvig Holberg, then An Enemy of the People by Henrik Ibsen, and on the third day Sigurd Jorsalfar by Bjørnstjerne Bjørnson.

National Theatre was founded as a private institution and weathered several financial crises until 1929, when the Norwegian government started providing modest support. A number of famous Norwegians have served as artistic directors for the theatre, but Vilhelm Krag who took over in 1911, is credited as having brought the theatre into its "golden age".

The theatre is often considered the home for Ibsen's plays, and most of his works have been performed here. Notable is also the children's Christmas play Journey to the Christmas Star (Reisen til Julestjernen), written by the theatre's finance director Sverre Brandt (1880–1962) and performed for the first time in 1924.

The main building is centrally located between the Royal Palace, Oslo and the Parliament of Norway. It is served by National Theatre Station and National Theatre metro stations. It was designed by architect Henrik Bull (1864–1953).

The theatre organisation manages four stages: the main stage (Hovedscenen), the amphitheatre (Amfiscenen) and Painting Parlour (Malersalen) within the main building. The fourth is the Torshov Theatre (Torshovteatret) in the Torshov district of Oslo.

== Directors of the Theatre ==
- 1899–1907 Bjørn Bjørnson
- 1908–1911 Vilhelm Krag
- 1911–1923 Halfdan Christensen
- 1923–1927 Bjørn Bjørnson
- 1928–1930 Einar Skavlan
- 1930–1933 Halfdan Christensen
- 1933–1934 Anton Rønneberg (acting)
- 1934–1935 Johe. Wiers-Jensen
- 1935–1941 Axel Otto Normann
- 1941–1945 Gustav Berg-Jæger
- 1945–1946 Axel Otto Normann
- 1946–1960 Knut Hergel
- 1960–1961 Carl Fredrik Engelstad
- 1962–1967 Erik Kristen-Johanssen
- 1967–1978 Arild Brinchmann
- 1978–1986 Toralv Maurstad
- 1986–1988 Kjetil Bang-Hansen
- 1988–1990 Ellen Horn, Ole-Jørgen Nilsen and Sverre Rødahl
- 1990–1992 Stein Winge
- 1992–2000 Ellen Horn
- 2000–2008 Eirik Stubø
- 2009–2020 Hanne Tømta
- 2021–present Kristian Seltun

== Gallery ==
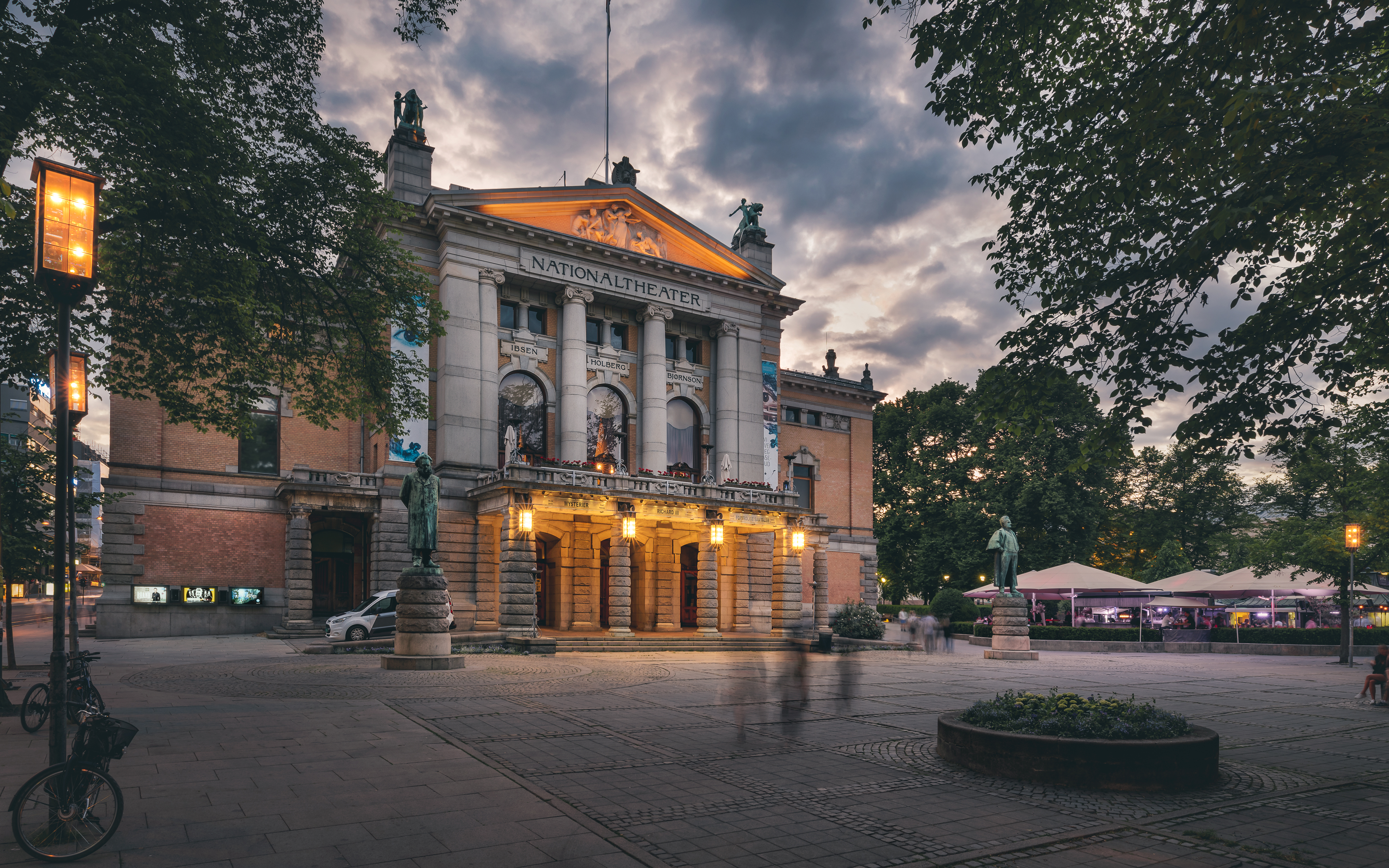

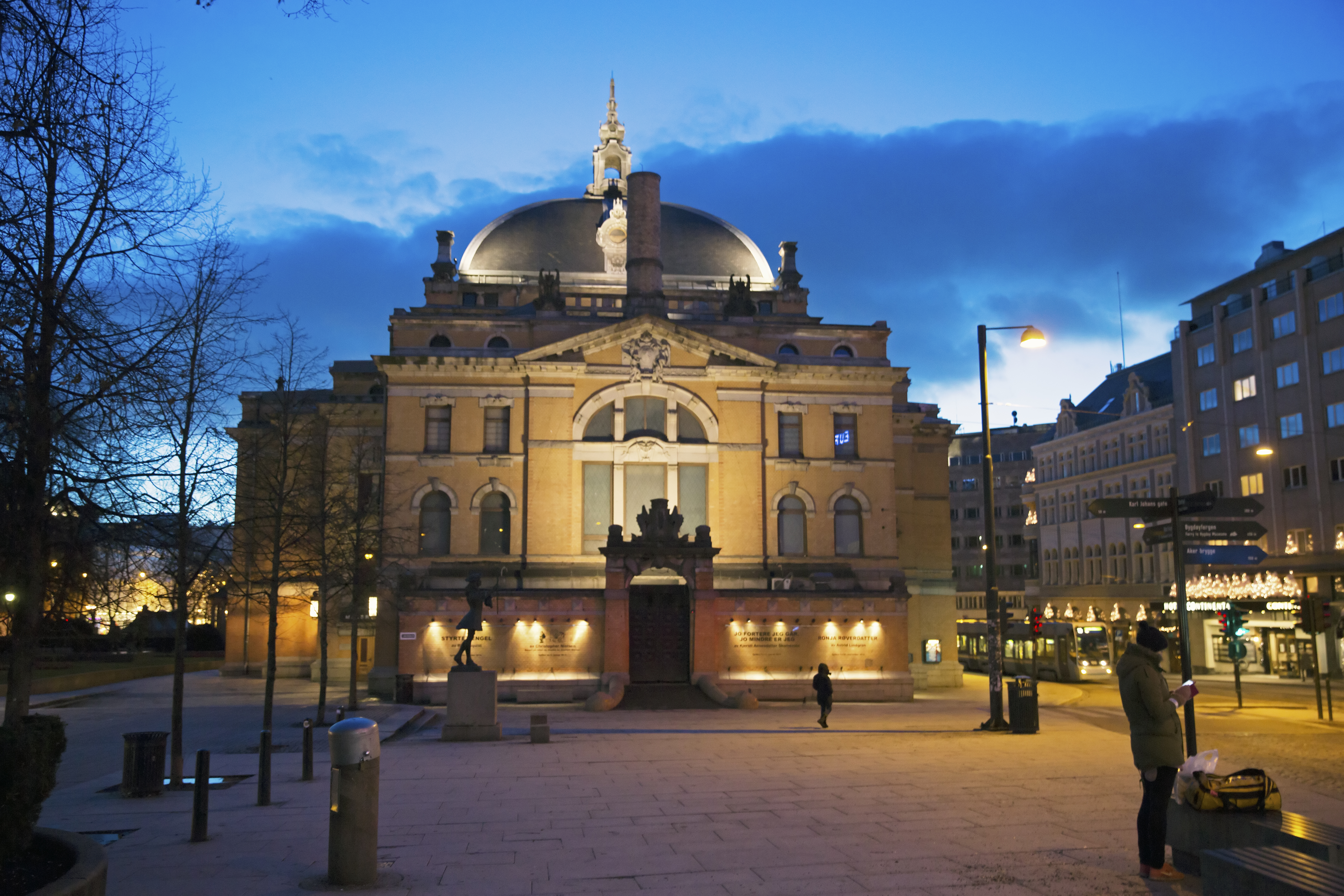

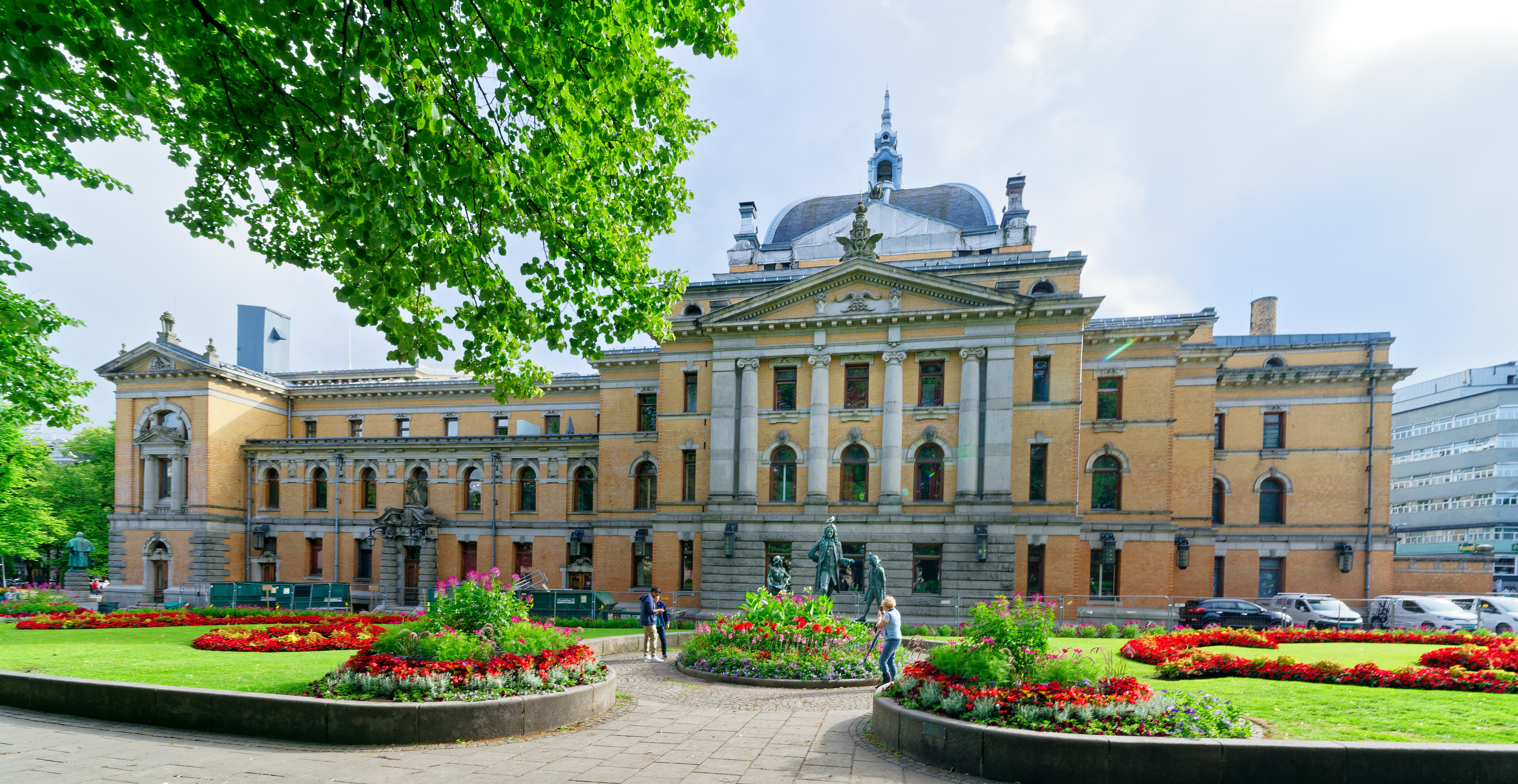

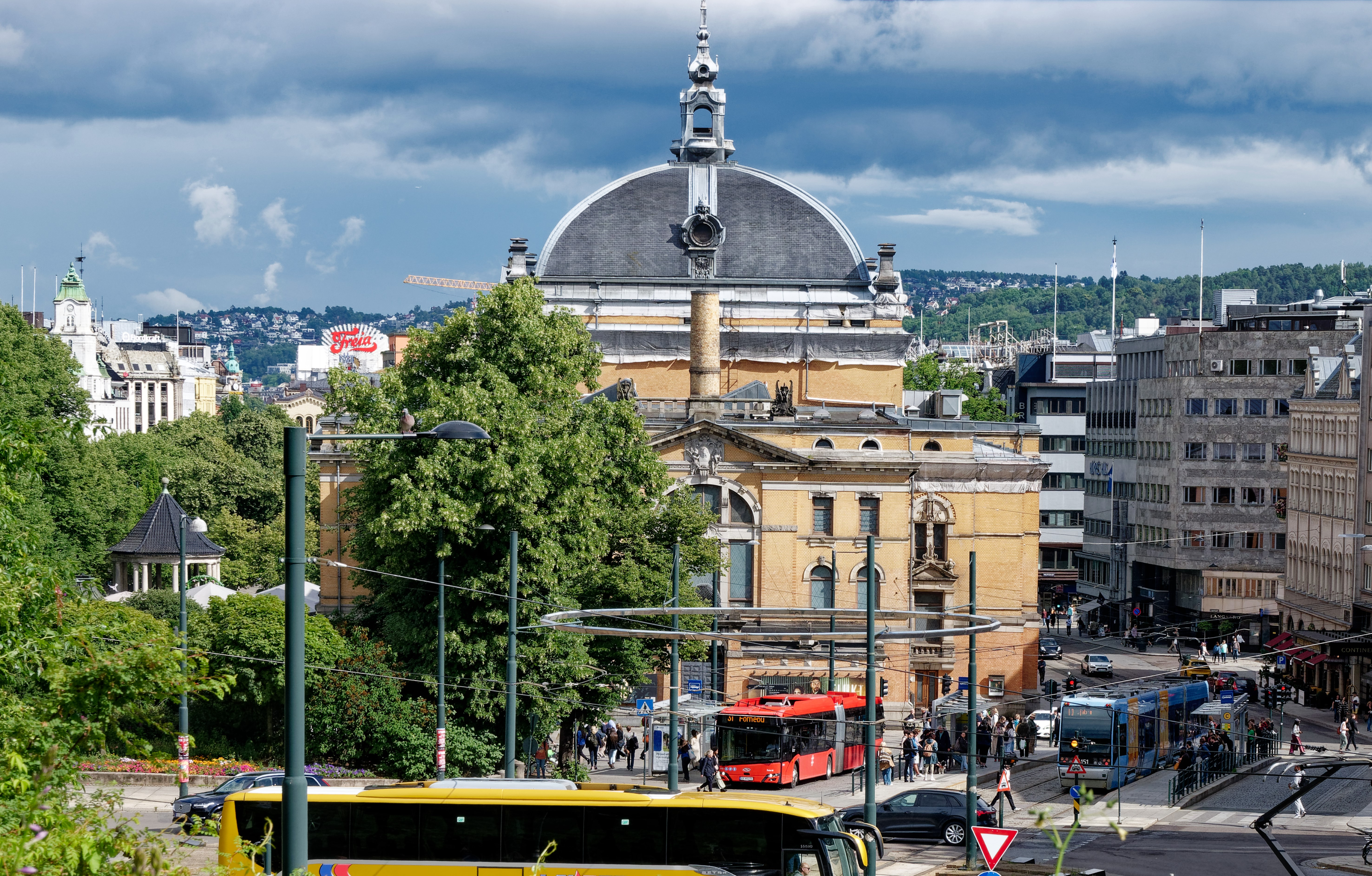

== See also ==
- Deutsches Theater, Oslo
