= Trøndelag Teater =

Theatre in Trondheim, Norway

Coordinates: 63.4292°N 10.3917°E

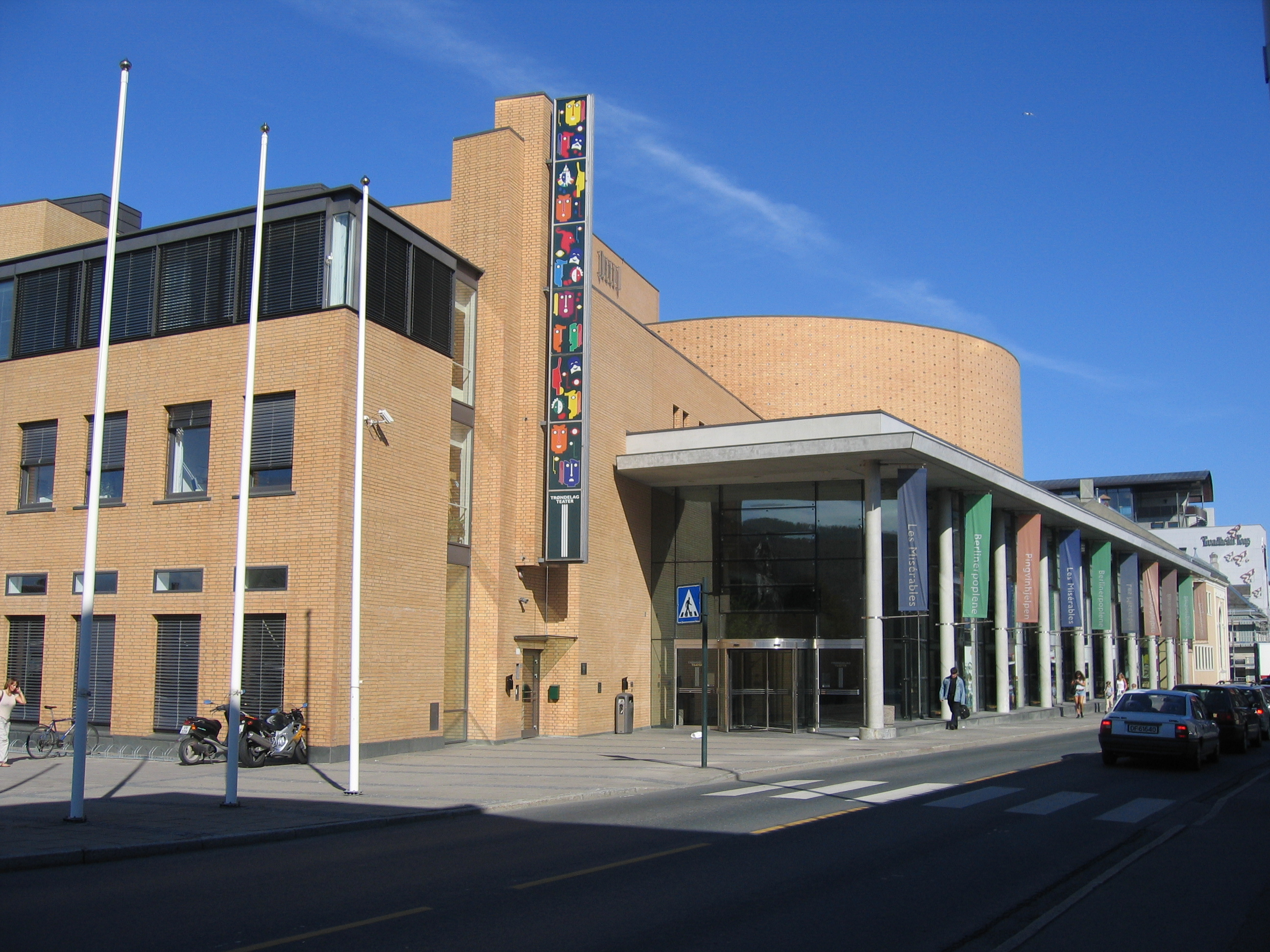
Trøndelag Teater.

Trøndelag Teater is a large theater in the city of Trondheim, in Trøndelag county, Norway.

Trøndelag Teater stages large-scale dance and musical performances.

== History ==
Originally built in 1816, the theater is the oldest stage in Scandinavia in continuous use. Initially, the theatre was used by the local Amateur Theatre, and after that by travelling Danish theater companies, some of which used it as a permanent theatre such as Johan Conrad Huusher (1829–1831), Carl Wilhelm Orlamundt (1831–1834), Jacob Mayson (1836–1839) and Gustav Wilhelm Selmer (1839–1848).

Between 1861 and 1865 it housed the first permanent Norwegian language theatre in the city, the Throndhjems Theater. Between 1865 and 1911, it was again used by travelling theatre companies. In 1911, a permanent theatre was established on the initiative of Sverre Brandt. It was closed in 1926.

Norwegian actor and theater director Henry Gleditsch took charge of Trøndelag Teater in 1937. His satirical style provoked the authorities of the German occupation of Norway during World War II. Henry Gleditsch was executed in 1942 by forces under the command of Josef Terboven.

During World War II, the theater "had been a spearhead in the artists' fight against the dictatorship", according to a 2014 Klassekampen article. Furthermore, due to the nation building project, some things were to be kept hidden. The attitudes were also transferred to Trøndelag Teater. In 1948, a former movie star of Nazi Germany, was hired as an actress—Kirsten Heiberg.

Norwegian actor, stage producer and theater director Ola B. Johannessen made his stage debut at Det Norske Teatret in 1961 and worked at this theater from 1962 to 1970. He served as theater director at Trøndelag Teater from 1979 to 1994 and again at Trøndelag Teater from 1997 to 2000.

In September 1997, the refurbished theater re-opened as part of a modern complex incorporating the old auditorium, supplemented by four new stages of various shapes and sizes. Kristian Seltun is the Theater Director. He replaced Otto Homlung in 2010.

== Stages ==
- Main Stage (Hovedscenen) - Technical facilities to stage large productions such as musicals.
- Studio Stage (Studioscenen) - Black box for contemporary, avant garde and experimental drama.
- Old Stage ( Gamlescenen) - Original theater is a small and intimate space.
- Café Theatre (Theatrecafeen) - Theatre, bar, restaurant; venue for smaller shows,
- Basement Stage (Teaterkjelleren) - Now used mainly for rehearsal purposes.

== See also ==
- Trondhjems Nationale Scene, which operated in Trondhem from 1911 to 1927
- Kirsten Heiberg

== Other sources ==
- Norway Cultural Profile
