= Heiberg =

Heiberg is both a surname and a given name. Notable people with the name include:

Surname:

- Anders Michael Heiberg (1767–1815), Norwegian jurist and politician
- Anton Heiberg (1878–1947), Norwegian stage instructor and theatre director
- Astrid Nøklebye Heiberg (1936–2020), Norwegian politician
- Axel Heiberg (1848–1932), Norwegian diplomat, financier, and patron
- Axel Heiberg (judge) (1908–1988), Norwegian judge
- Bernt Heiberg (1909–2001), Norwegian architect
- Chris Heiberg (born 1985), South African rugby player
- Christen Heiberg (civil servant) (1737–1801), Norwegian civil servant
- Christen Heiberg (physician) (1799–1872), Norwegian surgeon
- Edvard Heiberg (1911–2000), Norwegian engineer and railway director
- Eivind Heiberg (1870–1939), Norwegian engineer and railway director
- Elvin R. Heiberg III (1932– 2013), U.S. army general and engineer
- Erik Heiberg (1916–1996), Norwegian sailor and Olympic medalist
- Gerhard Heiberg (born 1939), Norwegian industrialist and International Olympic Committee organizer for the 1994 Winter Olympics
- Gunnar Heiberg (1857–1929), Norwegian poet, playwright, journalist, and theatre critic
- Gustav Adolf Lammers Heiberg (1875–1948), Norwegian barrister and politician
- Gustav Heiberg (1856–1935), Norwegian barrister and politician
- Hans Heiberg (1904–1978), Norwegian journalist, critic, essayist, novelist, and playwright
- Hjalmar Heiberg (1837–1897), Norwegian physician and anatomist
- Inge Heiberg (1861–1920), Norwegian physician and Belgian Congo official
- Jacob Vilhelm Rode Heiberg (1860–1946), Danish politician
- Jean Heiberg (1884–1976), Norwegian artist and professor
- Johan Ludvig Heiberg (philologist) (1854–1928), Danish philologist and historian
- Johan Ludvig Heiberg (poet) (1791–1860), Danish poet and critic
- Johanne Luise Heiberg (1812–1890), Danish actress
- Kirsten Heiberg (1907–1976), Norwegian actress and singer
- Marianne Heiberg (1945–2004), Norwegian social scientist, economist, and UN official
- Peter Andreas Heiberg (1758–1841), Danish author and philologist
- Sverre Heiberg (1912–1991), Norwegian photographer
- Svend O. Heiberg (1900–1965), Danish-American forester
- Thomasine Heiberg (1773–1856), Danish author (see: Thomasine Christine Gyllembourg-Ehrensvärd)

Given name:

- Axel Heiberg Stang (1904–1974), Norwegian landowner and forester
- Johan Widing Heiberg Landmark (1802–1878), Norwegian jurist and politician
- Margrete Heiberg Bose (1866–1952), Argentine physicist of Danish origin

== See also ==
- Heiberg, Minnesota, a community in the United States
- Heiberg Formation, geological formation in Northwest Territories, Canada
- Axel Heiberg Glacier, valley glacier, 48 km long, in the Queen Maud Mountains, Antarctica
- Axel Heiberg Island, island in the Qikiqtaaluk Region, Nunavut, Canada
- Heiberg Islands, group of four small islands north of Siberia
- Heberg
- Heideberg (disambiguation)
- Heilsberg (disambiguation)
- Heimberg (disambiguation)
- Heinsberg
