= Norwaco =

Norwaco is a union for rights holders in audiovisual works in Norway.

The organization administrates copyrighted works used by broadcasters. It was established in 1983.

== List of member bodies ==
This is a list of member bodies:

- Norwegian Specialized Press Association
- Norwegian Authors' Union
- Norwegian Publishers' Association
- Association for Norwegian Independent Record Companies
- Norwegian Association of Fine Arts Photographers
- Norwegian Organisation for Visual Communication
- Recording Artists Association
- IFPI Norway
- Norwegian Musicians' Union
- Norwegian Audiovisual Translators Association
- Norwegian Society of Composers and Lyricists
- Norwegian Association of Professional Photographers
- Norwegian Artists and Songwriters Association
- Norwegian Non-Fiction Writers' and Translators’ Association
- Norwegian Film Workers' Association
- Norwegian Union of Journalists
- Norwegian Society of Composers
- Norwegian Critics' Association
- Norwegian Music Publishers' Association
- Norwegian Association of Literary Translators
- Association of Norwegian Editors
- Norwegian Comedy Writers' Association
- Norwegian Union for Stage Directors
- Norwegian Actors' Equity Association
- National Federation of Norwegian Musical Soloists
- Norwegian Writers for Children
- Association of Norwegian Visual Artists
- Norwegian Ballet Union
- Writers' Guild of Norway
- Norwegian Film and TV Producers’ Association
- Directors Guild of Norway
- Norwegian Stage Designers Association
- New Music Composers' Group
- TONO
