= Carl Johan Theater =

Theater in Oslo, Norway

Coordinates: 59°54′52″N 10°44′16″E

The Carl Johan Theater (Norwegian: Carl Johan Teatret) was a theater in Oslo, Norway. It was initially located in the Christiania Tivoli amusement park in Oslo from 1893 to 1895, where it was led by Olaf Mørch Hansson. It staged performance of works such as Henrik Ibsen's Ghosts, Gabriel Finne's Før afskeden (Before the Farewell), and Gunnar Heiberg's Balkonen (The Balcony). Kalle Løchen was among the first actors it engaged.

In 1914 it became a silent film theater, one of three theaters in Oslo's Karl Johan neighborhood. It was located in the rear of the property at Karl Johans gate 39 and showed silent films until it was closed on June 1, 1931. It opened newly renovated in red, gold, and black as a theater stage on October 6, 1931, first led by Anton Heiberg, Thorleif Reiss, and Leif Enger. After renovation in the summer of 1933, Per Aabel and Thorleif Reiss took over as directors and led it through a period of staging comedies until 1938, when Aabel appeared in a guest performance at the Central Theater and then moved on to the National Theater. Nanna Stenersen made her debut at the theater in 1933, Ragnhild Michelsen performed there from 1935 to 1940 as well as Teddy Nordgren, and in 1936 Wenche Foss appeared at the theater and had her breakthrough in 1937 as the "champagne girl" (Norwegian: Champagnepiken), until she married in 1939 and announced her transfer to the Central Theater. Thora Neels-Hansson made her debut at the theater in 1938 and left in 1940. During the summers, the theater was rented out for summer revues. After Thorleif Reiss moved on to the Norwegian Broadcasting Corporation in 1939, the theater briefly closed.

The theater reopened on September 3, 1939 with Eigil Beck and AS Comedia as the new owner, new management, and a production of Anita Loos's The Whole Town's Talking with Hauk Aabel. Actors during this period included Frank Robert (1939, debut – 1941), Stig Egede-Nissen (1940–1942), Arne Bang-Hansen (1941–1945), Axel Thue (1942), Alice Mürer Siem (1942, debut), Espen Skjønberg, and Jack Fjeldstad (1942–1944). The music for the performances was often written by Carsten Carlsen, the husband of Lalla Carlsen, who played at the theater from 1940 to 1943. During the Second World War, the theater was led by Ellen Isefiær, who initially wanted to manage a stage with a more literary orientation and moved away from farces. In May 1944, the theater donated a day's salary and income to the suffering in Bergen.

A cabaret with the Danish actress and singer Lulu Ziegler was the highlight of the opening of newly renovated premises (often referred to as Paletten 'The Palette') on September 14, 1945, with Fridtjof Mjøen as the artistic director. Calle Moseby was also involved in the theater's management after the war, but the city's theaters frequently moved during this time, and the Carl Johan Theater was part of the Studio Theater from 1946 to 1950. Leo Lenz's comedy Trio (Norwegian title: To og to er tre 'Two and Two Are Three') was its first production, with music by Kristian Hauger and Leif Enger. After the Studio Theater closed in 1950, the Carl Johan Theater was an annex theater for the Oslo New Theater until 1952.

After a renovation costing NOK 200,000, the theater reopened on September 25, 1952 with a screening of Jens Bjerre's 1951 documentary film Himalaya – Verdens tag (The Himalayas: The Roof of the World). It was now operated by the company Oslo Kinematografer headed by Kristoffer Aamot, who used the theater for showing films. Norway's first screening of a 3D film (with polaroid filters) took place here on January 18, 1953, with cartoons by Norman McLaren, British landscape films, and some ballet. The theater ceased operating in April 1982, when it was decided that the building would be demolished.

As a standalone theater it was closed in 1946.

== Selected performances ==
Performances and screenings that took place at the Carl Johan Theater include the following:

- 1895: Hannemor by Gerhart Hauptmann
- 1921: Growth of the Soil, directed by Gunnar Sommerfeldt, preview
- 1926: Veddeløpet om en kvinne (Race for a Woman), silent film
- 1930: Der Balletterzherzog (The Prince and the Dancer; Norwegian title Wienerblod 'Vienna Blood'), directed by Max Neufeld, silent film
- 1931: Med beltebil gjennom Finnmark og Lappland (By Tracked Vehicle through Finnmark and Lappland), directed by Edvard Vethe, silent film
- 1931, 1938: Meine Schwester und ich (My Sister and I; Norwegian title: Min søster og jeg) by Ralph Benatzky, operetta
- 1932: Det blå Hawaii (Blue Hawaii), directed by B. W. Paker, starring Erling Hanson and Else Heiberg, premiere
