= Vidar Sandem =

Norwegian actor, playwright and theatre director

- Born: 19 February 1947 (age 79); Trøgstad, Norway
- Occupations: Actor, playwright, theatre director

Vidar Sandem (born 19 February 1947) is a Norwegian actor, playwright and theatre director.

He made his stage debut at Den Nationale Scene in 1970. He started working at Det Norske Teatret in 1977, and served as theatre director from 1997. Among his film roles is the father in Per Blom's The Ice Palace from 1987, based on a novel by Tarjei Vesaas. His debut as a playwright was the one-act play Straffe-, aired at Fjernsynsteatret in 1988.

Cultural offices
Preceded by Otto Homlung	Director of the Det Norske Teatret; 1997-2010	Succeeded by Erik Ulfsby
