= Thora Hansson =

Norwegian actress and director (1848–1917)

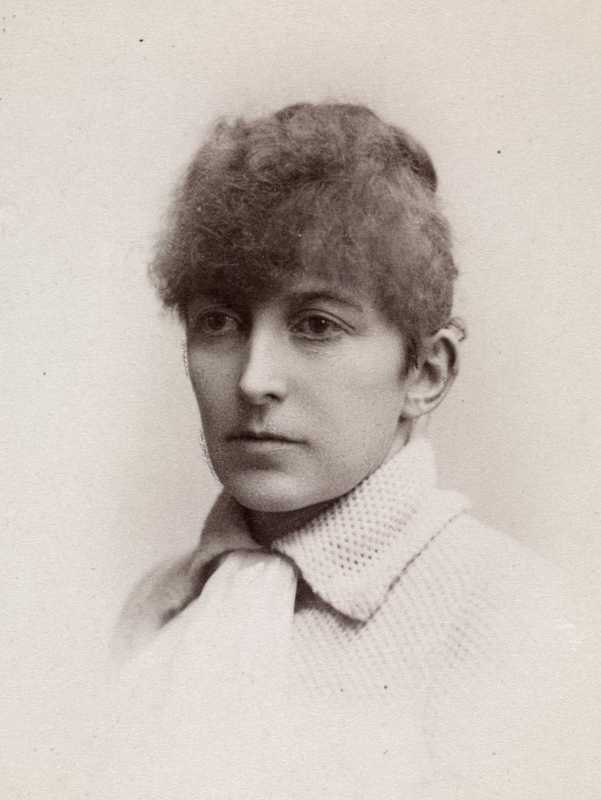
Thora Neelsen became the first Solveig in Ibsen's Peer Gynt in 1876, here pictured in 1890. Photographer: Louise Abel.

Thora Hansson (2 December 1848 – 11 September 1917) was a Norwegian actress and theatre director.

== Biography ==
Hansson made her stage début at Christiania Theater in 1871, and worked at this theatre until 1899. Thora Hansson was the first actress to portray Solveig in Henrik Ibsens play Peer Gynt when it premiered in 1876. She was the first manager of the theatre Trondhjems nationale Scene, from 1911 to 1913. From 1914 until her death in Stavanger at age of 69 in 1917, she was director of the theatre in Stavanger.

She was born in Christiania (now called Oslo) on 2 December 1848. Her parents were Jørgen Friederich Neelsen (1808–1862), an architect, and Julie Hedvig Rustad (1821–1878). Thora was married to theatre director Olaf Mørch Hansson (1856–1912) between 1880 and 1896. They were parents to Thorolf Mørch Hansson (1881–1952), a diplomat, and Gunnar Neels-Hansson (1883–1967), who became a theatre director. Gunnar was the father of the actress Thora Neels-Hansson (1918–2007), better known as Nøste Schwab.

She died on 11 September 1917.
