= Ebba Haslund =

Norwegian writer

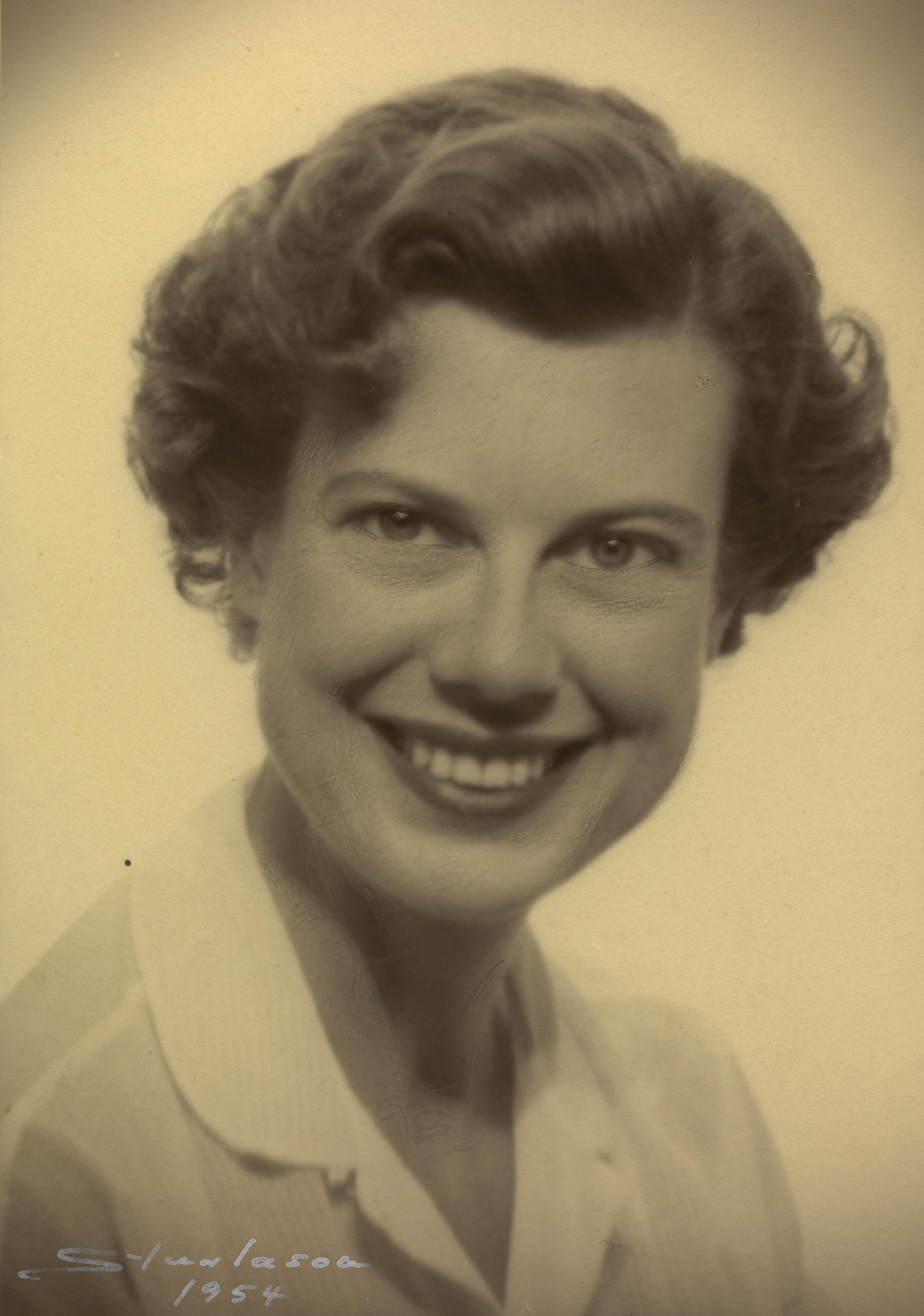
- Ebba Haslund in 1954
- Born: 12 August 1917; Seattle, Washington, United States
- Died: 10 July 2009 (aged 91); Oslo, Norway
- Occupations: Novelist; writer of short stories; playwright; essayist; children's writer; literary critic; radio speaker; politician
- Awards: Norwegian Booksellers' Prize (1966); Riksmål Society Literature Prize (1968); Ossietzky Award (2006); Fritt Ord Honorary Award (2007)

Ebba Margareta Haslund Halvorsen (12 August 1917 – 10 July 2009) was an American-Norwegian novelist, writer of short stories, playwright, essayist, children's writer, literary critic, radio speaker and politician.

== Early and personal life ==
Haslund was born in Seattle, Washington as the daughter of Frantz Philip Haslund (1883–1974) and Ebba Margareta Gillblad (1890–1957). Haslund has described her father as an "adventurer", and they travelled regularly during her early life. She became a student in 1935, and studied languages in both England, Germany and France before World War II. She graduated from the University of Oslo in 1941 with the cand.philol. degree. In 1940 she married businessman Sverre Fjeld Halvorsen (1910–2005), who was imprisoned at Grini and in Poland during World War II, but survived.

Haslund used to live in Blommenholm, but died, aged 91, in Oslo.

== Career ==
=== Literary career ===
Haslund made her literary debut in 1945 with the short story collection Også vi –. The following year came the publication of her first novel, Siste halvår, about the adolescence of young girls. The independent continuation Det hendte ingenting (1948) was virtually ignored by the press at the time, but has later been regarded as one of her most important books. Narrated by shy Edle Henriksen, a student at the University of Oslo in 1939, the novel is about friendship among three women students, as well as Edle's unrealized lesbian longing. It was translated into English in 1987, with the title Nothing Happened. Hafslund's literary breakthrough was proclaimed with the emerging of Middag hos Molla (1951), and again with her next novel, Krise i august (1954).

Haslund has written several audio plays for radio. Her debut as playwright was the audio play Himmelsk dilemma (1952). Her play Kjære Nils (1956) was awarded a prize for "best audio play for children". She was a board member of the Writers' Guild of Norway from 1961 to 1967, and vice chair from 1967 to 1974.

She has written several books for children and youth, such as Frøken Askeladd (1953), Barskinger på Brånåsen (1960), and Mor streiker (1981). A selection of her essays is found in the collections Født til klovn (1977), Kvinner, fins de? (1980) and Hønesvar til hanefar (1983). She has also written three memoir books, Som plommen i egget (1987), Med vingehest i manesjen (1989) and Ikke naken, ikke kledd (1992).

She worked as a literary critic for Aftenposten from 1970 to 1990, and editor-in-chief of the magazine Ordet from 1966 to 1967. She was a columnist in several newspapers, including Klassekampen and Budstikka.

=== Organisational work ===
Haslund was board member of the Norwegian branch of International PEN from 1955 to 1957, and vice chairman from 1964 to 1967. She was a board member of Forfatterforeningen av 1952—a breakaway faction of the Norwegian Authors' Union which lasted from 1952 to 1966—from 1961 to 1963 and chaired the Norwegian Writers for Children from 1965 to 1970. In the Norwegian Authors' Union she was a board member from 1966 to 1970, vice chairman from 1970 to 1971 and chairman from 1971 to 1975. She received honorary membership in the Norwegian Authors' Union in 1975, and in the Norwegian Association for Women's Rights in 1995. For the rest of her life she was the only honorary member of the Association for Women's Rights. She was a member of the board of Riksteateret from 1969 to 1977, a member of the Norwegian Language Council from 1976 to 1980 and a deputy member of the Arts Council Norway from 1977 to 1980. She was also a board member of Klassekampen.

=== Politician ===
Haslund served as a deputy representative to the Norwegian Parliament from Oslo during the term 1958–1961 and from Akershus during the term 1961–1965. She took John Lyng's seat while he served as Prime Minister between August and September 1963. Despite her affiliation to the Conservative Party of Norway at that time, she was called "Red Ebba" during her time in the Norwegian Authors' Union. She was inspired by the radical feminism of the 1960s and 1970s, especially by the activity of Norwegian researcher and socialist politician Berit Ås. In a 2007 interview Haslund stated that she does not vote Conservative, but Liberal.

== Awards ==
Ebba Haslund was awarded the Norwegian Booksellers' Prize in 1966 for the novel Det trange hjerte, and the Riksmål Society Literature Prize for Syndebukkens krets in 1968. She received the Ossietzky Award in 2006 and the Fritt Ord Honorary Award in 2007.

Cultural offices
Preceded by Odd Bang-Hansen	Chair of the Norwegian Authors' Union; 1971–1975	Succeeded by Bjørn Nilsen
