= Norwegian Authors' Union =

Association of Norwegian authors

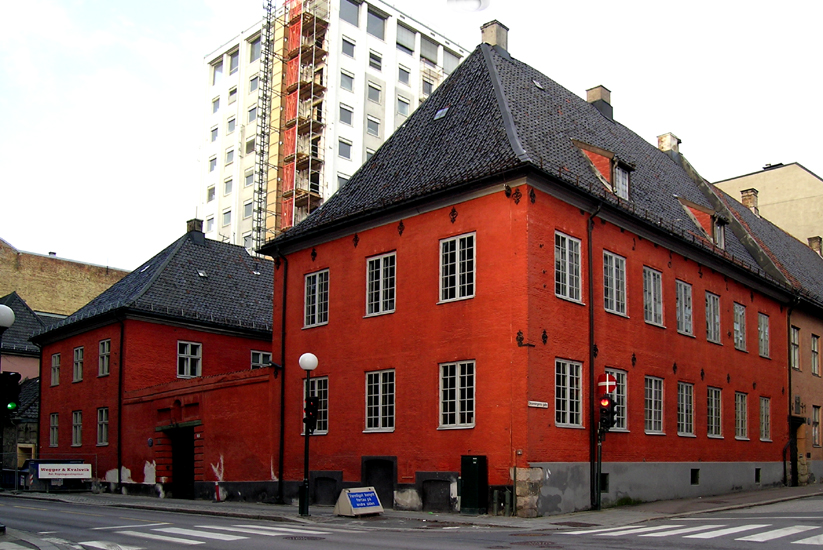
Rådhusgata 7, Oslo serves as offices for the Norwegian Authors' Union, the Norwegian Critics' Association, the Norwegian Writers for Children and the Writers' Guild of Norway.

The Norwegian Authors' Union (Norwegian: Den norske Forfatterforening, DnF) is an association of Norwegian authors. It was established in 1893 to promote Norwegian literature and protect Norwegian authors' professional and economic interests. DnF also works in solidarity with persecuted writers internationally.

As of 2024 the association had approximately 760 members.

== Organization activities ==
The Norwegian Authors' Union Literary Council annually awards a number of government and independently established scholarships to both members and non-members. The Literary Council consists of nine members and provides counsel on all matters of literary art, in addition to decisions on awards. A number of famous Norwegian authors have been members of the council.

== List of leaders ==
- 1894– Gustav Storm (non-fiction section)
- 1894–1896 Arne Garborg (fiction section)
- 1894–1896 Andreas Aubert
- 1896–1900 Jacob Hilditch
- 1900–1903 Jacob Breda Bull
- 1903– Moltke Moe
- 1903–1905 Gerhard Gran
- 1905–1908 Vilhelm Krag
- 1908–1910 Jacob Hilditch
- 1910–1913 Hans Aanrud
- 1913–1916 Peter Egge
- 1917–1919 Nils Collett Vogt
- 1920–1922 Johan Bojer
- 1922– Ole Lie Singdahlsen
- 1922–1923 Oskar Braaten
- 1923–1928 Arnulf Øverland
- 1928–1932 Ronald Fangen
- 1933– Oskar Braaten
- 1934– Johan Bojer
- 1935– Peter Egge
- 1936–1940 Sigrid Undset
- 1940– Georg Brochmann
- 1941–1945 Alex Brinchmann
- 1946–1965 Hans Heiberg
- 1965–1971 Odd Bang-Hansen
- 1971–1975 Ebba Haslund
- 1975–1977 Bjørn Nilsen
- 1977–1981 Camilla Carlson
- 1982–1985 Johannes Heggland
- 1985–1987 Karsten Alnæs
- 1987–1991 Toril Brekke
- 1991–1997 Thorvald Steen
- 1997–1999 Inger Elisabeth Hansen
- 1999–2001 Karsten Alnæs
- 2001–2005 Geir Pollen
- 2005–2012 Anne Oterholm
- 2012–2017 Sigmund Løvåsen
- 2017–2022 Heidi Marie Kriznik
- 2022– Brynjulf Jung Tjønn
