= Georg Dedichen =

Norwegian chemist (1870–1942)

Georg Maria Dedichen (8 July 1870 – 3 December 1942) was a Norwegian chemist.

== Biography ==
He was born in Modum as a son of physician Hans Gabriel Sundt Dedichen (1836–99) and his wife Caroline Henriette Fredrikke Thaulow (1836–1917). He was a brother of psychiatrist Henrik Dedichen and a maternal grandson of Heinrich Arnold Thaulow. He attended Trondheim Technical School (now Norwegian University of Science and Technology). He continued his studies in Kristiania, Wiesbaden and Kiel.

He took the doctorate at the University of Kiel in 1894 on the thesis Synthesen von Benzolhydragenen mittelst Hydrazinhydrat, his doctoral advisor being Theodor Curtius. In 1904 he was awarded the Crown Prince's gold medal (Kronprinsens gullmedalj) for the paper Bestemmelse av basiske ringsystemers affinitetsstørrelse.

He worked at the University of Kristiania (now University of Oslo) until 1911, at the Norwegian Industrial Property Office from 1911 to 1917 and at the chocolate company Freia from 1917. In 1930 he became a lecturer in chemistry at the University. He also worked as the editor of chemistry in Teknisk Ugeblad.

In June 1895 he married Danish citizen Hetna Ingeborg Brandes (1876–1936), a daughter of Edvard Brandes. Through his son, shipbroker Jan Kurt Dedichen, he was a father-in-law of Aase Bye. Through his sister Christiane he was a brother-in-law of Jacob Vilhelm Rode Heiberg, and an uncle of Hans Heiberg.
