= The Ice Palace (1987 film) =

1987 film

- Directed by: Per Blom
- Written by: Per Blom; Tarjei Vesaas
- Starring: Line Storesund; Hilde Nyeggen Martinsen
- Release date: 26 December 1987
- Running time: 78 minutes
- Country: Norway
- Language: Norwegian

The Ice Palace (Norwegian: Is-slottet) is a 1987 Norwegian drama film directed by Per Blom based on the novel of the same name. The film was selected as the Norwegian entry for the Best Foreign Language Film at the 61st Academy Awards, but was not accepted as a nominee.

== Cast ==
- Line Storesund as Siss
- Hilde Nyeggen Martinsen as Unn
- Merete Moen as Moster / Aunt
- Sigrid Huun as Mother / Moren
- Vidar Sandem as Father
- Knut Ørvig as En eldre mann / Old Man
- Urda Brattrud Larsen as Bente
- Charlotte Lundestad as Den nye jenta

== Production ==
Hilde Nyeggen Martinsen said the most difficult scene was the end one where she goes inside the ice castle and freeze so terribly.

Line Storesund said she never had any big dreams of becoming an actress until her mother came across an advertisement in Aftenposten where they were looking for a girl age 11 to 12 for the lead role in this film.

== Reception ==
The film won the Grand Prix for Best Film at Film Fest Gent in 1988.

== See also ==
- List of submissions to the 61st Academy Awards for Best Foreign Language Film
- List of Norwegian submissions for the Academy Award for Best Foreign Language Film
