= Jacob Vilhelm Rode Heiberg =

Norwegian civil servant and burgomaster

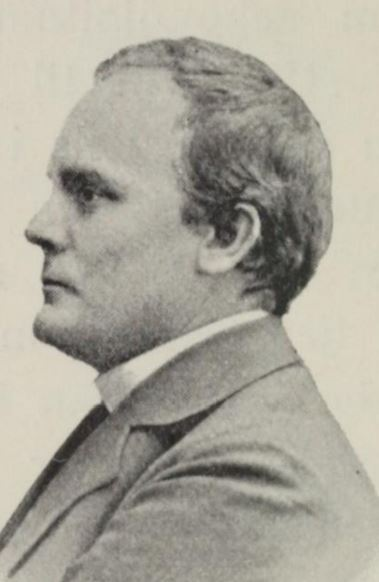
Jacob Vilhelm Rode Heiberg

Jacob Vilhelm Rode Heiberg (19 February 1860 – 19 February 1946) was a Danish-born Norwegian civil servant and burgomaster.

== Biography ==
Heiberg was born in Vallø, Denmark, the son of judge Edvard Omsen Heiberg (1829–1884). He was a brother of Gunnar and Inge Heiberg, as well as a first cousin of Eivind and Gustav Adolf Lammers Heiberg and a first cousin once removed of Bernt, Axel and Edvard Heiberg.

He took the examen artium in 1878 and graduated with the cand.jur. degree in 1884. He had been hired in the Ministry of Church and Education already in 1878, and became subdirector in 1894. He had influence on the development of folkebogsamlinger ("people's book collections") a predecessor institution of the more modern public libraries. In 1901 he published the book Folkebogsamlinger i Norge samt forslag til nyordning. In 1909 he became burgomaster in Norway's capital Kristiania. From 1923 to his retirement in 1928 he was city manager.

In April 1895 in Modum he married Christiane Jeanette Aimée Dedichen. Through her he was a brother-in-law of Henrik and Georg Dedichen. He was the father of Hans Heiberg.
