= Hilditch =

Hilditch is a surname. Notable people with the surname include:

- Andrew Hilditch (born 1956), Australian cricketer
- David Hilditch (1963–2023), Northern Ireland politician
- George Hilditch (1803–1857), British artist
- Jacob Hilditch (1864–1930), Norwegian writer
- Lal Hilditch (1894–1977), English footballer
- Mark Hilditch (born 1960), English footballer
- Ron Hilditch (born 1953), Australian rugby league player and coach
- Stephen Hilditch (born 1946), Irish rugby union referee
- Thomas Hilditch (1885–1957), English cricketer
- Thomas Percy Hilditch (1886–1965), English chemist
- Tom Hilditch (born 1965), English journalist and magazine publisher
