= Sigurd Eldegard =

Norwegian actor, playwright, and theatre director

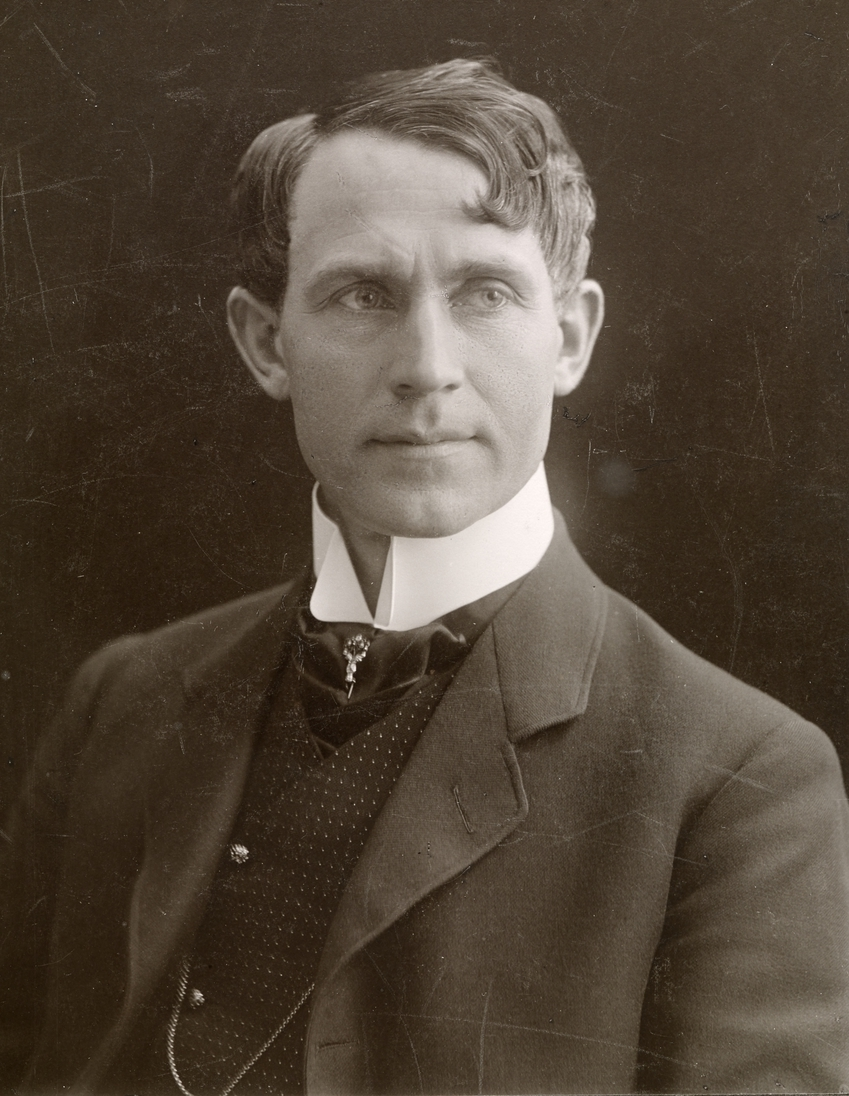
Eldegard c. 1907–1910

Sigurd Eldegard (10 July 1866 – 30 January 1950) was a Norwegian actor, playwright and theatre director.

He was born in Årdal Municipality to farmers Sjur Ingebrigtsen Eldegard and Johanne Jørgensdatter Vetti. He made his stage debut at Christiania Theater in 1891, where he continued acting for six years. He then played two years at Fahlstrøms teater and then at Sekondteatret. From 1901 to 1931 he was engaged at the Nationaltheatret, except for two years with Det Norske Teatret. He served as theatre director at Det Norske Teatret from 1918 to 1920. As playwright he is best known for the play Fossegrimen from 1903, which was first staged at Nationaltheatret in 1905, with music by Johan Halvorsen.
