= Johan Hansen =

Johan Hansen may refer to:

- Jóhan Hansen, Faroese-born Danish handballer
- Johan Hansen (1838–1913), Danish businessman and art collector
- Johan Kjær Hansen, member of the Danish resistance

== See also ==
- Johan Irgens-Hansen, Norwegian literary critic, theatre critic and theatre director
