= Det Norske Teatret =

Theatre in Oslo, Norway

Coordinates: 59°54′54″N 10°44′19″E

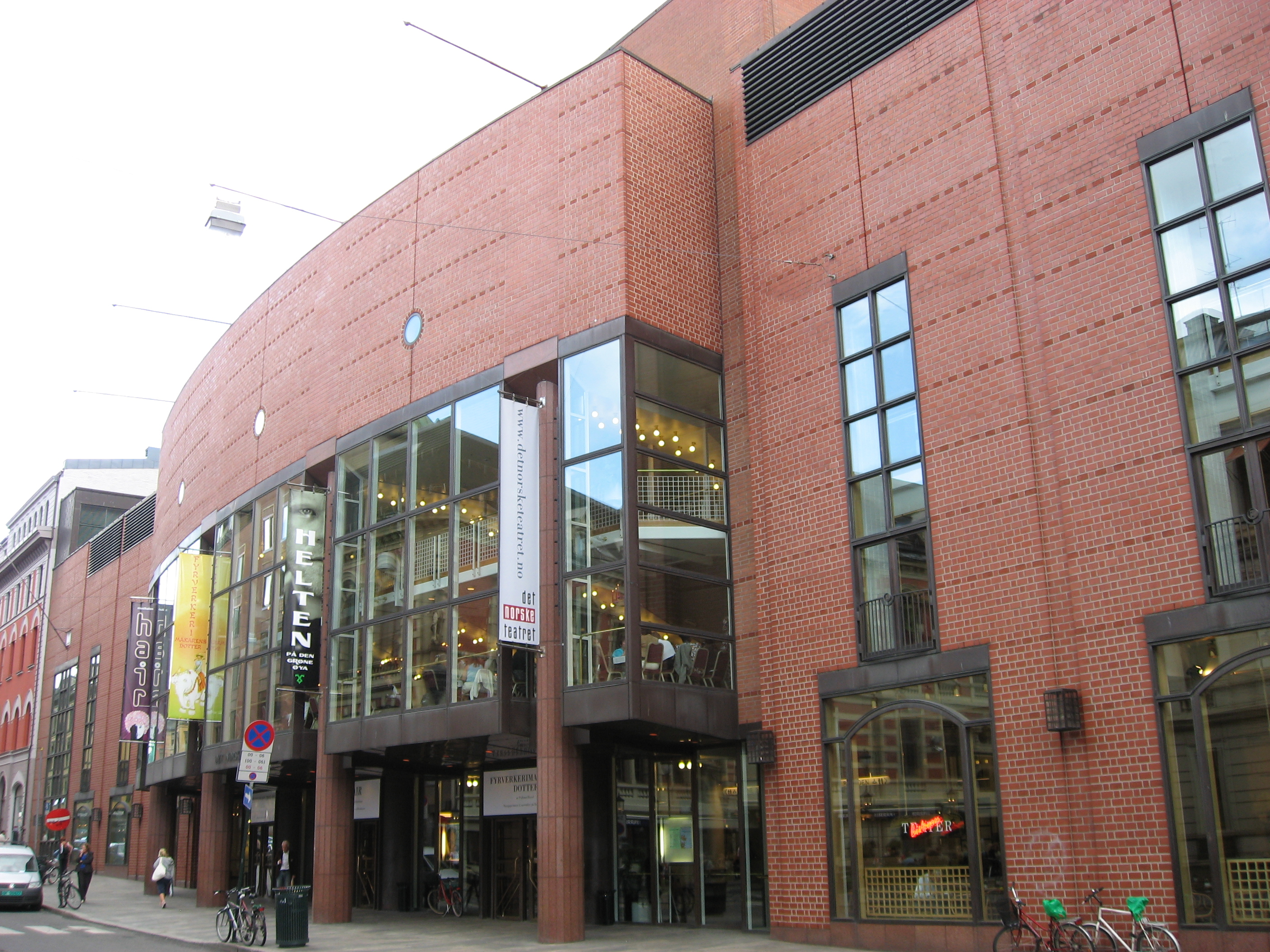
- Main entrance
- Interactive map of Det Norske Teatret
- Address: Kristian IVs gt 8 Oslo; Norway

Construction
- Opened: 6 October 1913
- Years active: 1912–present

Det Norske Teatret (English: Norwegian Theater) is a theatre in Oslo. It was founded in 1912, after an initiative from Hulda Garborg and Edvard Drabløs. It opened in 1913, touring with two plays, Ervingen by Ivar Aasen and Rationelt Fjøsstell by Hulda Garborg. Its first official performance was Ludvig Holberg's comedy Jeppe på berget, with Haakon VII of Norway and the prime minister of Norway among the spectators. Hulda Garborg was the first board manager, and Rasmus Rasmussen was the first theatre director. The theatre primarily performs plays written in or translated into Nynorsk.

The theatre has three stages, and about 12–15 productions per year, plus guest plays. Five of Jon Fosse's plays saw their first productions on Det Norske Teatret: Nokon kjem til å komme (1996), Ein sommars dag (1999), Vakkert (2001), 3ogtosaman (2001) and Rambuku (2006).

The theatre was awarded Spellemannprisen in 1979 for the musical play Så lenge skuta kan gå.

== Theatre directors ==
Actor and singer Rasmus Rasmussen was the theatre's first director, from 1912 to 1915. Edvard Drabløs was one of the founders, and served as a director from 1915 to 1916, and also from 1950 to 1951. Amund Rydland, who had been with the theatre from the start, was the director from 1916 to 1922 (shared with Anton Heiberg and Sigurd Eldegard in periods). After him Ingjald Haaland served as theatre director for eleven years, from 1922 to 1933. Hans Jacob Nilsen was theatre director from 1933 to 1934, and from 1946 to 1950. The writer Oskar Braaten had earlier worked as a consultant for the theatre, and served as its director from 1934 to 1936. The actor Knut Hergel was director from 1936 to 1942, and again from 1945 to 1946. His period was interrupted by Nasjonal Samling's Cally Monrad from 1942 to 1945, during the German occupation of Norway. This forced movement by the Nazis was answered with a total boycott by the public. The jurist Ole Barman was theatre director 1951–1953, and Nils Sletbak, also jurist, 1953–1961. Dramaturg and writer Tormod Skagestad served two periods, from 1961 to 1965, and from 1976 to 1979. Actor and instructor Svein Erik Brodal was the theatre's director from 1975 to 1975, and again from 1979 to 1990. Instructor Otto Homlung was director from 1990 to 1997. Actor and dramatist Vidar Sandem served as theatre director from 1997 to 2010. Erik Ulfsby was appointed theatre director from 2011.

== Early repertory ==
1913

Ivar Aasen's Ervingen and Hulda Garborg's Rationelt fjøsstell were played on the theatre's first touring day, in Kristiansand on 2 January 1913. At this occasion also a prologue written by Anders Hovden was read. Olav Hoprekstad's Bjørnefjell was played the next day in Kristiansand. Ludvig Holberg's Jeppe på Berget was played in Volda in February, and later at the official opening in Bondeungdomslaget's assembly hall in Bøndernes Hus in Kristiania 6 October 1913. At this official opening, President of the Storting Jørgen Løvland, prime minister Gunnar Knudsen, the ministers Bryggesaa, Castberg, Abrahamsen, Keilhau and Urbye, President of the Odelsting Johan Ludwig Mowinckel, and King of Norway, Haakon VII were present. "Jeppe" was played by the theatre's director Rasmus Rasmussen. The next day, Oskar Braaten's Stor-Anders was played. In November 1913, the theatre played Friarar by Hoprekstad, and two plays by Gustaf af Geijerstam, Lars-Anders and Jan-Anders.

1914

In 1914 the theatre played Molière's comedy Arme Jørgen (George Dandin), Arne Garborg's Læraren, Oskar Braaten's Ungen (in Stavanger), Sigurd Eldegard's Gamlelandet, and Hulda Garborg's Tyrihans.
