= Gunnar Neels-Hansson =

Norwegian theatre director (1883–1967)

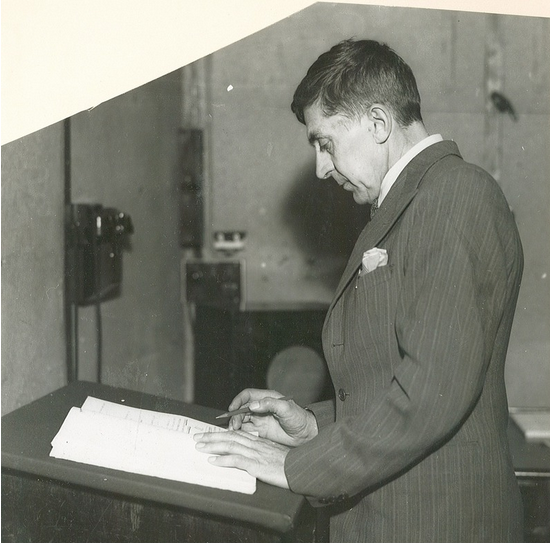
- Born: 27 July 1883; Kristiania, Norway
- Died: 9 June 1967 (aged 83)
- Occupation: Theatre director
- Children: Thora Neels-Hansson
- Parent(s): Thora Elisabeth Neelsen; Olaf Mørch Hansson
- Relatives: Per Schwab (son-in-law)

Gunnar Neels-Hansson (27 July 1883 – 9 June 1967) was a Norwegian theatre director. He was born in Kristiania to Thora Elisabeth Neelsen and Olaf Mørch Hansson. His daughter Thora Neels-Hansson was married to Per Schwab.

Neels-Hansson was assigned with Stavanger scene as stage director from 1915, and later with Chat Noir. From 1927 to 1950 he was appointed theatre director at NRK's Radioteatret.
