= Anton (1973 film) =

1973 Norwegian film by Per Blom

- Promotional poster
- Directed by: Per Blom
- Written by: Per Blom
- Starring: Bjørn Erik Jessen
- Release date: 1973
- Running time: 113 minutes
- Country: Norway
- Language: Norwegian

Anton is a 1973 Norwegian drama film written and directed by Per Blom, starring Bjørn Erik Jessen. 15-year-old Anton Olsson (Jessen) lives in a little village in rural Norway. As his father loses his grip on reality, Anton's mother, who left home when Anton was little, returns.

== Plot ==
Anton is 15 years old, and the day he and old Johannes shoots the horse, the peace is gone. His father is already lost in his living room chair, and his mother turns up to make amends for not being there.
