= Johan Irgens-Hansen =

Johan Irgens-Hansen (1854–1895) was a Norwegian literary critic, theatre critic and theatre director. He wrote theatre criticism for the newspapers Norske Intelligenssedler and Dagbladet. He was theatre director of the Bergen theatre Den Nationale Scene from 1890 to 1895.

Cultural offices
Preceded by Gunnar Heiberg	Director of Den Nationale Scene; 1890-1895	Succeeded by Olaf Mørch Hansson
