= Gustav Thomassen =

Norwegian stage actor and theatre director (1862-1929)

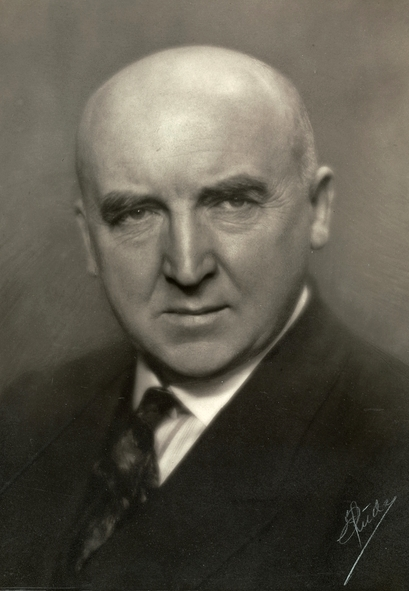
- Gustav Thomassen, c. 1925
- Born: 16 February 1862; Bergen, Norway
- Died: 6 May 1929 (aged 67)
- Occupation(s): Stage actor and theatre director

Gustav Thomassen (16 February 1862 – 6 May 1929) was a Norwegian stage actor and theatre director.

== Biography ==
Thomassen was born in Bergen, Norway. He was the son of Salmaker Osmund Thomassen (1816-1892) and Caroline Olava Thomine Eckhoff (1828-1871). He made his stage debut in 1881 at Den Nationale Scene in Bergen. He worked at Den Nationale Scene until 1905, and served as theatre director from 1900 to 1905.

From 1905 to 1929 he worked as an actor and instructor at Nationaltheatret in Oslo. He was noted for his title role in the four act comedy Jan Herwitz. Gamle Bergensbilleder which was written by Hans Wiers-Jenssen in 1913. From 1916-1923, he worked as a director. His main effort at the Nationaltheater was the staging of comedies by Ludvig Holberg, especially Jeppe på bjerget (1722), Den Stundesløse (1723) Erasmus Montanus (1722) and Barselstuen (1723).

Cultural offices
Preceded by Hans Aanrud	Director of the Den Nationale Scene; 1900–1905	Succeeded by Anton Heiberg
