= Heideberg =

Heideberg may refer to:

- Heidehöhe (also called the Heideberg, near Gröden), a hill on the Brandenburg-Saxony border in Germany
- Heideberg (Grevesmühlen), a hill in Mecklenburg-Vorpommern east of Grevesmühlen in the district of Nordwestmecklenburg, Germany
- Heideberg (Vierkirchen), a village in the Saxon municipality of Vierkirchen (Oberlausitz) in the German district of Görlitz
- Kobyla Góra (formerly Heideberg im Landkreis Kempen, Wartheland), a municipality in the Greater Poland Voivodeship
