= Erik Ulfsby =

Norwegian actor

- Born: 2 October 1970 (age 55); Oslo, Norway
- Education: Norwegian National Academy of Theatre
- Occupations: Actor, stage instructor and theatre director
- Awards: Hedda Award (2006)

Erik Ulfsby (born 2 October 1970) is a Norwegian actor, stage instructor and theatre director.

== Biography ==
Ulfsby was born in Oslo, and educated at the Norwegian National Academy of Theatre. As an actor, he has performed at Trøndelag Teater (Trondheim), Den Nationale Scene (Bergen) and Teatret Vårt (Molde), and has worked with radio, television and film. As a theatre director, he received the Hedda Award in 2006 (for Bollywood Ibsen – Fruen fra Det indiske hav) and in 2009 (for Jungelboka). He was appointed artistic director at Det Norske Teatret from 2011.

Cultural offices
| Preceded by Vidar Sandem | Director of the Det Norske Teatret; 2011- | Succeeded by |
