= Nils Sletbak =

Norwegian jurist and theatre director

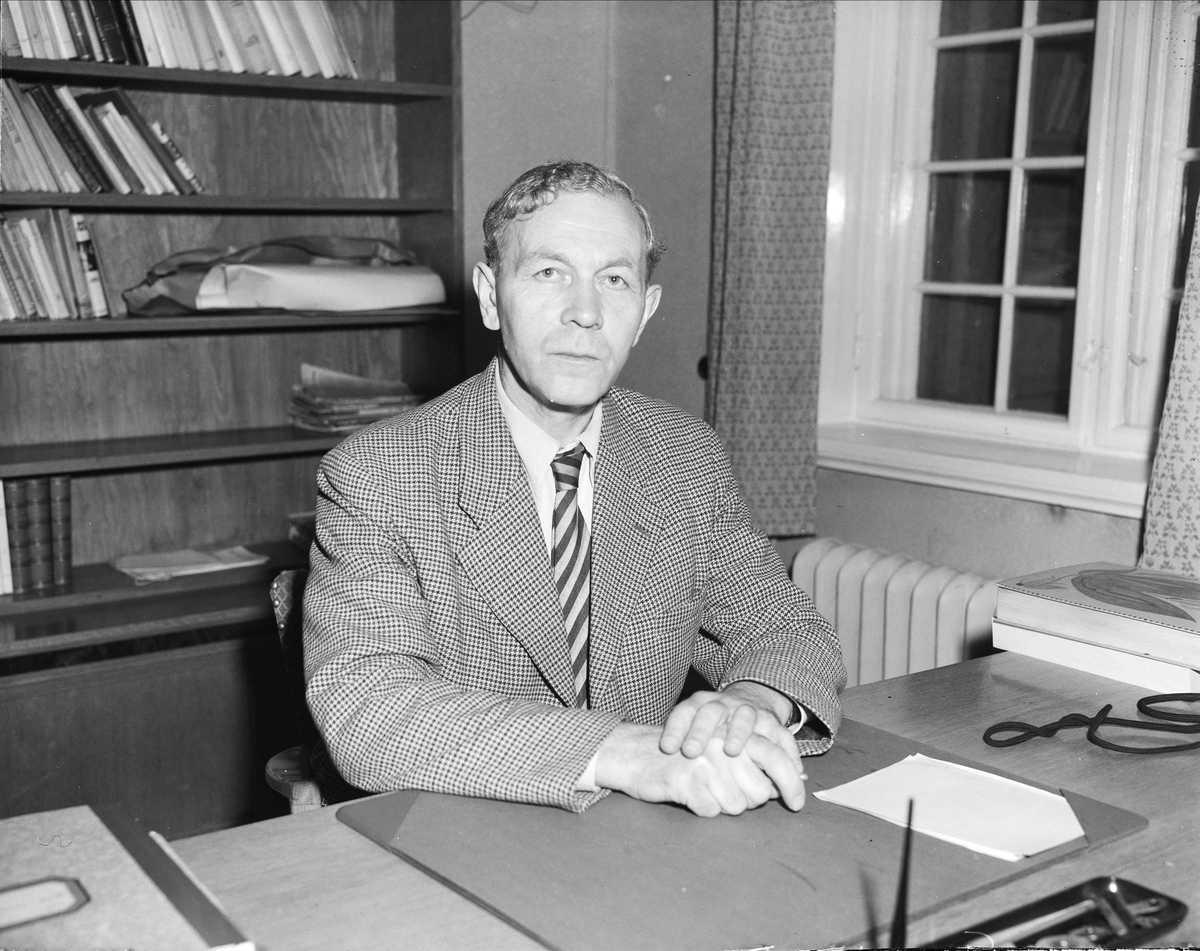
- Born: 16 January 1896; Sunndal Municipality, Norway
- Died: 24 January 1982 (aged 86)
- Education: University of Oslo
- Occupations: Jurist and theatre director

Nils Arne Sletbak (16 January 1896 – 24 January 1982) was a Norwegian jurist and theatre director.

== Biography ==
Sletbak was born in Sunndal Municipality, Norway. He graduated as a cand.jur. at the University of Oslo.

He was an active proponent for Nynorsk culture and language. He was chairman of the board of Det Norske Teatret from 1932 to 1935, chairman of the organization Bondeungdomslaget in Oslo, and contributor to the newspaper Den 17de Mai. He was theatre director of Det Norske Teatret from 1953 to 1961.

Cultural offices
Preceded by Ole Barman	Director of the Det Norske Teatret; 1953–1961	Succeeded by Tormod Skagestad
