= Alf Sanengen =

Norwegian resistance member (1913–1991)

- Born: 2 October 1913; Glemmen, Norway
- Died: 13 January 1991 (aged 77)
- Occupation: Chemist

Alf Sanengen (2 October 1913 – 13 January 1991) was a Norwegian resistance member during World War II, chemist and research administrator. He was born in Glemmen. During the occupation of Norway by Nazi Germany, Sanengen was among the central leaders of the civil resistance. He was manager of Sentralinstitutt for industriell forskning (SI) from 1950 to 1975. He was chairman of the board of Borregaard from 1965. He was a member of the gentlemen's skiing club SK Fram since 1970.

Non-profit organization positions
Preceded by Edvard Heiberg	Chairman of the Norwegian Polytechnic Society; 1960–1962	Succeeded by Haakon Haraldsen
