= Bjørn Nilsen =

Norwegian poet and television producer (1934–2026)

- Born: 27 December 1934; Strinda, Norway
- Died: 16 March 2026 (aged 91)
- Education: University of Oslo
- Occupations: Poet, journalist, television producer
- Employer: NRK
- Organization: Norwegian Authors' Union
- Awards: Amanda Award (1988)

Bjørn Nilsen (27 December 1934 – 16 March 2026) was a Norwegian poet and television producer.

== Background ==
Born in Strinda (now Trondheim) on 27 December 1934, Nilsen was a son of Eilif Asbjørn Nilsen and Borgunn Alvilde Iversen. He was married twice, first to Lisbeth Ruud, and second to Ellen Aanesen.

He graduated with examen artium from Strinda gymnas in 1952. After working a period as a bus driver, he studied at the University of Oslo, where he graduated as cand.philol. in 1962, majoring in Norwegian.

== Career ==
His literary debut was the poetry collection Hvis jeg var trollmann from 1960, with ironical poems from life in Oslo. He followed up with the poetry collections Underveis mot oppbrudd (1974), PResens (1966) and Innta plassene (1967), and the collage Glad hverdag (1969). Further the documentary book Hamningberg, Fraflytting og umyndiggjøring (1970), and poetry and text collections with political agitation, Norge, vårt Norge (1971), and Veien fram går først tilbake (1974). Two furher non-fiction books are NRK – makthavernes monopol (1975) and Det brutale oljeeventyret (1979). His next books were the poetry collection På tide (1980), and the short story collection Rips med vaniljesaus (1983), about interpersonal relationships viewed from men's perspectives. The documentary Gjenferd i Nordsjøen (1984) treats the Kielland accident, while Ingen kjent trafikk (1988) treats the Mehamn air crash.

His books from the 1990s include the non-fiction Skjult dagsorden (1998), and the poetry collection Glasbrått og fjærastein (1999). His poetry collection Speilet lyg from 2003 is written in trønder dialect. In 2006 he wrote a biography on businessman and inventor Nekolai Dahl.

He was a member of the editorial board of the literary magazine Profil, a co-founder of The Norwegian Writers' Center (Norwegian: Norsk Forfattersentrum), and a leader of the Norwegian Authors' Union from 1975 to 1977, having succeeded Ebba Haslund. He worked for the Norwegian Broadcasting Corporation from 1964 to 1992, and as a freelance producer until 1998. He received the Amanda Award for his television documentary Olje in 1988.

Nilsen died on 16 March 2026, at the age of 91.

Cultural offices
Preceded by Ebba Haslund	Chair of the Norwegian Authors' Union; 1975–1977	Succeeded by Camilla Carlson
