= Olaf Mørch Hansson =

Norwegian actor, theatre director, journalist and newspaper editor (1856–1912)

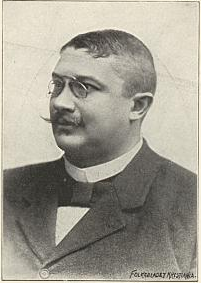
Olaf Hansson

Olaf Mørch Hansson (28 July 1856 – 22 February 1912) was a Norwegian actor and theatre director, journalist and newspaper editor. He was married to Thora Hansson from 1880 to 1896, and then to Agnethe Schibsted-Hansson from 1896 to 1912.

== Biography ==
Olaf Mørch Hansson was born in Eiker (now Øvre Eiker), in Buskerud county, Norway. After a year at Drammen scholars school and one year at Trondheim Technical Learning Institution he had finished his schooling.

He made his stage debut in 1877 at Den Nationale Scene in Bergen. He worked at Christiania Theater from 1878 to 1883, and edited the newspaper Norske Intelligensseddeler from 1883 to 1886. He served as theatre director of Den Nationale Scene for two periods, from 1895 to 1899, and from 1908 to 1909. From 1886 to 1893, he was an actor and director at the Christiania Theater, then head of the Carl Johan Theater for two years. Periodically, he played in Olaus Olsen's theatre company and visited with his wife at the Centralteatret and Fahlstrøm Theater operated by Johan Peter Broust Fahlstrøm (1867–1938).

As an actor and director, he contributed greatly to shaping the modern Norwegian theater. Hansson was a promoter of naturalism on the stage. He created the acceptance of colloquially as the stage language and built a very realistic and lifelike appearance in his stage settings. Besides his journalistic activities, Olaf Hansson wrote two plays, Repræsentanten fra Kongsvinger and (along with Bjorn Bjornson) Moppy and Poppy. He wrote his autobiography Oplevelser og Humoresker in 1912.

Cultural offices
Preceded by Johan Irgens Hansen	Director of the Den Nationale Scene; 1895–1899	Succeeded by Hans Aanrud
Preceded by Anton Heiberg	Director of the Den Nationale Scene; 1908–1909	Succeeded by Ludvig Bergh
