= TONO =

Norwegian music copyright corporation

TONO SA
- Trade name: TONO
- Industry: other professional, scientific and technical activities n.e.c.
- Incorporated: February 20, 1995
- Founded: November 27, 1928
- Headquarters: Kongens gate 12, Oslo
- Members: 45,540 (2025)
- Number of employees: 82 (2024)
- Website: www.tono.no

TONO is a Norwegian corporation that administers copyrights for music in Norway.

It is owned and governed by its members; composers, music publishers and text-writers. Through the managing agreement the originators give TONO an exclusive right to administer the members' performing rights in Norway.

By 2006 the number of members reached about 14,000, through agreements of reciprocation with about 60 other corporations, organised under the umbrella-organisation CISAC. TONO de facto manages the whole world-repertoire. TONO was originally created in 1928 under the name of Norsk Komponistforenings Internasjonale Musikkbyrå. Managing of mechanical rights is transferred to NCB, Nordisk Copyright Byrå.

Norway has ratified the Berne Convention protecting literary and artistic productions. Furthermore, the convention's articles are continued in Norwegian law through Lov om opphavsrett til åndsverk 12. mai Nr.2 1961 (åndsverkloven). The law provides the originator an exclusive right to make productions accessible to an audience. Thereby also granting the originator an exclusive right to consent in public use of their productions. According to the law the production is made accessible when it is performed publicly. An important principle of the Berne Convention is that foreign originators, whose country has ratified the convention, as the same protection has national originators.

On this legal background TONO collects amends for broadcasting and other public use of musical productions. Responsible for paying the fee is the person responsible for making the production accessible to the public. The fees are then distributed to each originator individually. The deductions are made possible by reports made by those responsible for making the productions accessible. The reports contain information of the productions that have been used as well as frequency. As a result of TONO being a non-profit organisation, over 80% of the total income is transferred to the originators. The net result transferred to the originators in 2005 was 218,579,908 kr.

== See also ==
- ASCAP
- Norwaco
