= Ole Barman =

Norwegian jurist, novelist, short story writer, playwright and theatre director

Ole Gregor Liljedahl Barman (1897–1983) was a Norwegian jurist, novelist, short story writer, playwright and theatre director.

Among his novels are Fast i fjellet from 1930 and Ein mann gjekk heim from 1933. He published the short story collections Han Kristafor-Knut og andre karar in 1927, Sjørop in 1928, and Draumen in 1968. He adapted his novel Ein mann gjekk heim into a play, which was staged by Ingjald Haaland at Det Norske Teatret in 1936. Haaland played the character "fisher/farmer", and other actors were Einar Tveito and Lars Tvinde. He worked as the bailiff in Bærum from 1939 to 1967, except for his period at Det Norske Teatret. He was theatre director at Det Norske Teatret from 1951 to 1953. The first performance in the season 1951-1952 was Strindberg's play Miss Julie, which was followed by Oskar Braaten's play Ungen, an adaptation of Marcel Pagnol's comedy The Baker's Wife, and Charlotte Hastings' criminal play Sister Mary. The play based on Alf Prøysen's novel Trost i taklampa, which premiered in February 1952, was a great success and has been characterized as a milestone in the history of Det Norske Teatret. Prøysen's songs were performed by Prøysen himself. In 1953 the theatre celebrated its 40th anniversary, and for this occasion four plays were selected, Olav Duun's Medmenneske, Aslaug Vaa's Tjugendedagen, Cora Sandel's Krane's konditori, and Pär Lagerkvist's Han som fekk leva livet om att. An adaptation of Paul Eliot Green's The Field God was staged in March 1953. Ole Barman's short story Gjenta som elska fanden was adapted into a comedy, and premiered in August 1953.

Barman chaired Norges Lensmannslag from 1938 to 1952, and the organization Norsk Bokmannslag from 1948 to 1963.

Cultural offices
Preceded by Hans Jacob Nilsen	Director of the Det Norske Teatret; 1951-1953	Succeeded by Nils Sletbak
