= Anton Heiberg =

Norwegian theatre director (1878–1947)

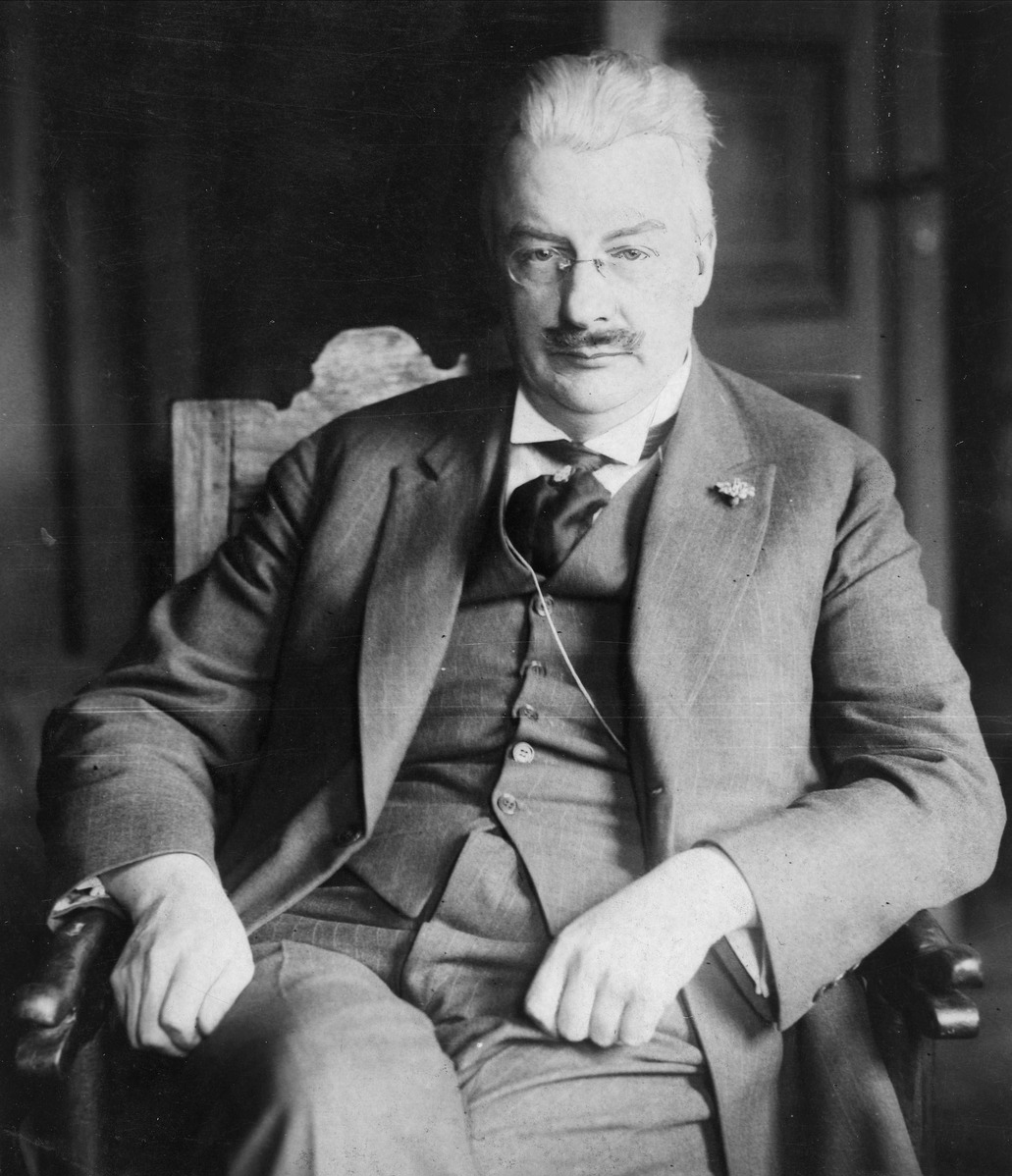
- Anton Heiberg
- Born: 26 March 1878; Christiania, Norway
- Died: 11 September 1947 (aged 69)
- Occupation: theatre director
- Relatives: Gunnar Edvard Rode Heiberg (brother); Jacob Vilhelm Rode Heiberg (brother); Inge Heiberg (brother)

Anton Wilhelm Scheel Heiberg (26 March 1878 – 11 September 1947) was a Norwegian stage instructor and theatre director.

He was born in Christiania (now Oslo), Norway. He was a son of judge Edvard Omsen Heiberg (1829–1884) and his wife Minna (Vilhelmine) Rode (1836–1917). He was the brother of Gunnar Edvard Rode Heiberg, Jacob Vilhelm Rode Heiberg, and Inge Heiberg. He studied law from 1896 and took his law degree in 1902.

From 1903 he was a stage director and from 1905, he was theatre director at the Nationaltheatret. He was theatre director of the Den Nationale Scene in Bergen from 1905 to 1907. He was in charge of Tivoli Teater in Kristiania from 1912 to 1914. He was stage director for Maaltheatret in 1915, and artistic director at the Norwegian Theatre 1915-16. He ran the Friluftsteatret summer theatre at Bygdøy in the 1920s, and the cabaret Edderkoppen together with Bokken Lasson. He reopened the Carl Johan Theater in 1931, and also worked as instructor for Centralteatret.

Cultural offices
Preceded by Gustav Thomassen	Director of Den Nationale Scene; 1905-1907	Succeeded by Olaf Mørch Hansson
