= Anne Oterholm =

Norwegian writer

Anne Oterholm (born 18 January 1964) is an American-born Norwegian novelist and literary critic. Among her novels are Ikke noe annet enn det du vil from 1995 and Avbrutt selskap from 1996. From 2005 to 2012 she was the leader of the Norwegian Authors' Union. She was awarded the Aschehoug Prize in 2010.

== Chair of literature committee at Arts Council Norway ==
Anne Oterholm has served as the head of literature committee at Arts Council Norway for the last 8 years (2014-2021). Arts Council Norway which functions as an advisory body to the Government and public sector on cultural affairs and is the main department for implementing Norwegian cultural policy.

Cultural offices
Preceded by Geir Pollen	Chair of the Norwegian Authors' Union; 2005–2012	Succeeded by Sigmund Løvåsen
