= Per Schwab =

Norwegian theatre director

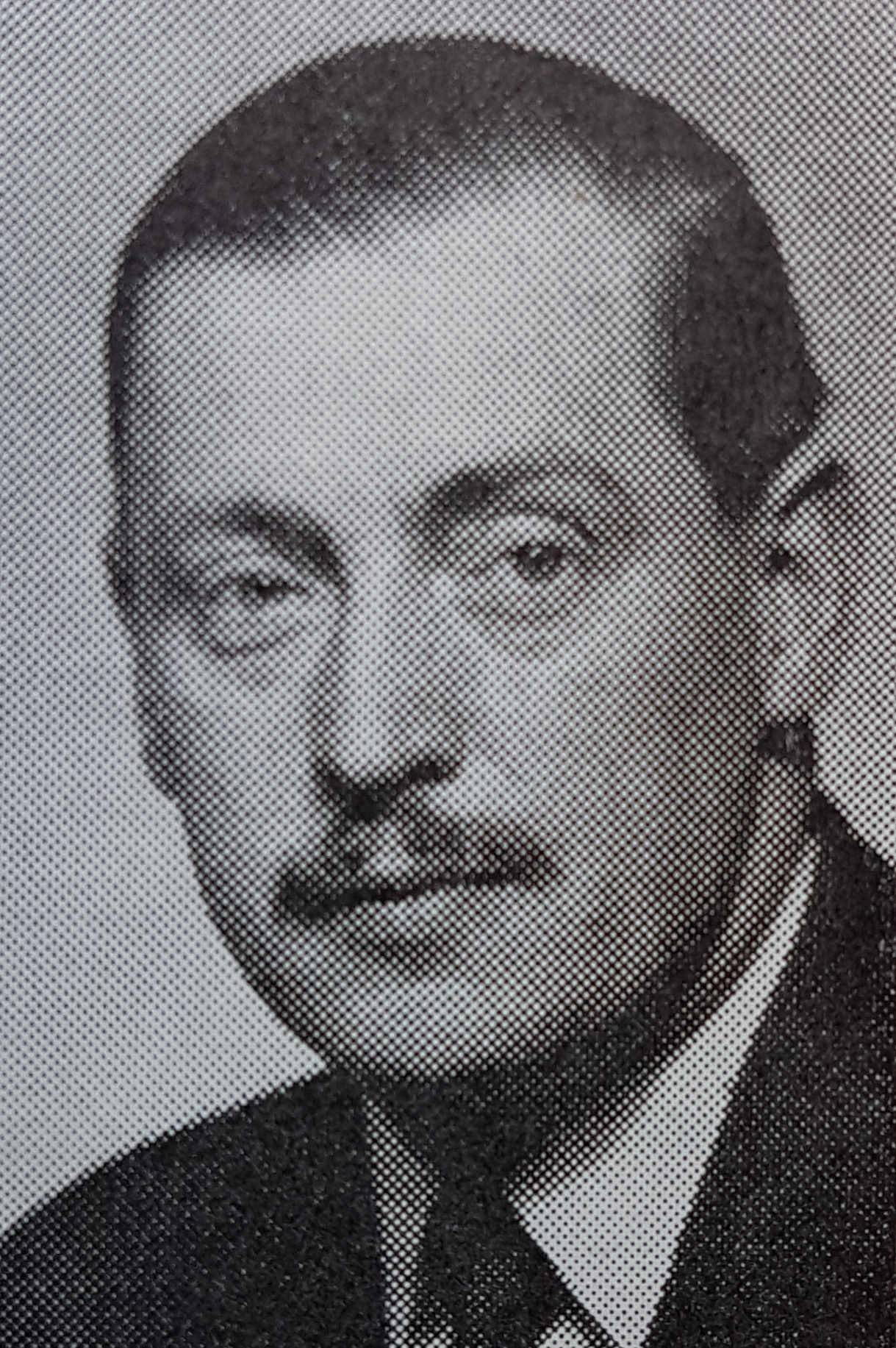
Per Schwab

Per Schwab (17 August 1911 – 2 August 1970) was a Swedish-born Norwegian painter, scenographer, and theatre director.

== Biography ==
Schwab was born in Stockholm, Sweden. His parents were the professor Eigil Wilhelm Schwab (1882–1952) and the painter Anna Axén (1880–1962). He attended the Royal Institute of Technology in Stockholm and studied for six years at the Royal Swedish Academy of Fine Arts. He was hired by the theater director Hans Jacob Nilsen as a scene painter at the National Theater in Bergen in 1934. He became the permanent scenographer and later served as theatre director from 1952 to 1961. From 1961 onward he worked as a scenographer at the National Theatre.

Schwab married the actress Astrid Leikvang (1907–1997) in 1937; they were divorced in 1942. In 1944, Schwab married another actress, Thora Neels-Hansson (1918– 2007), the daughter of the theatre director Gunnar Neels-Hansson (1873–1967). Their daughter, Tine Schwab, became a set designer and scenographer at the Oslo Opera House.

Cultural offices
Preceded by Georg Løkkeberg	Director of the Den Nationale Scene; 1952–1961	Succeeded by Bjarne Andersen
