= Trondhjems Nationale Scene =

Theatre in Trondheim, Norway (1911–1927)

Coordinates: 63.4294°N 10.3924°E

Trondhjems Nationale Scene ("the National Stage of Trondheim") was a theatre that opened in Trondheim in 1911, and closed in 1927. The theatre's first artistical director was Thora Hansson, from 1911 to 1913. The opening performance was held on 15 September 1911, with Bjørnstjerne Bjørnson's play Sigurd Jorsalfar with Grieg's music, and Ibsen's play Fruen fra Havet was performed the next day. The theatre performed eighteen different plays the first season.

After the theatre closed in 1927, it would take ten years until Trondheim again had a permanent theatre, when Trøndelag Teater opened in 1937.

== Theatre directors ==
- Thora Hansson 1911–1913
- Ludvig Müller 1913–1916
- Rasmus Rasmussen 1916–1923
- Hans Bille 1923–1924
- Johan Hauge 1924–1925
- Victor Ivarson 1926–1927
