= Tormod Skagestad =

Norwegian writer, actor and theatre director

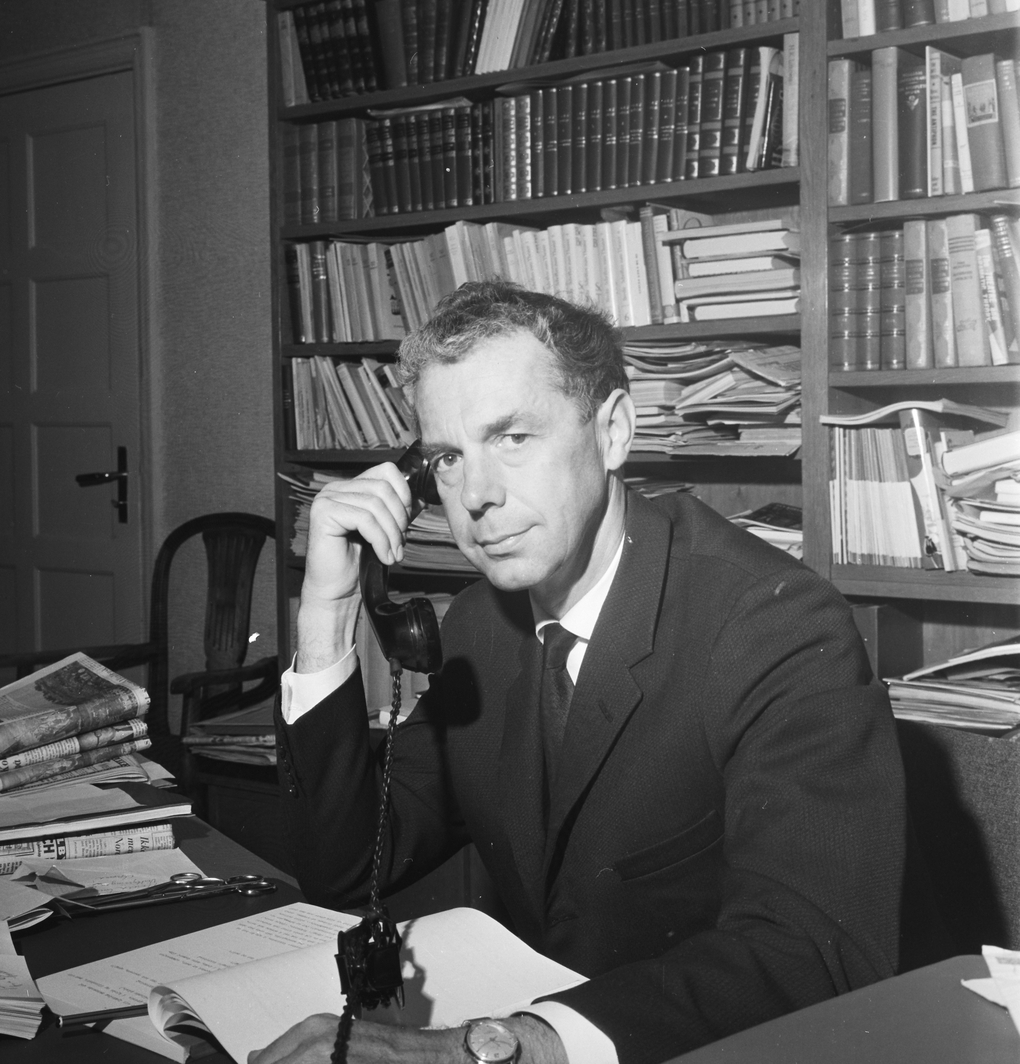
- Tormod Skagestad in 1964
- Born: 9 August 1920; Krødsherad, Norway
- Died: 4 January 1997 (aged 76)
- Occupations: poet novelist playwright actor theatre director

Tormod Skagestad (9 August 1920 – 4 January 1997) was a Norwegian poet, novelist, playwright, actor and theatre director.

== Biography ==
Tormod Skagestad was born in Krødsherad, Buskerud county, Norway. Skagestad grew up in a rich cultural environment. His father was a teacher and sexton of the village, his mother was the organist. After his final exams (1942) and he earned a master's degree in drama at the University of Wisconsin (1946–48).

After a period at Radioteatret (1949–1953), Skagestad worked as an instructor at Det Norske Teatret (1953–1961), served as theatre director from 1961 to 1975, and again from 1976 to 1979. He was chairman of the Norwegian Association of Theatre Manager (Norsk Teaterlederforening) for several periods and president of the Association of Norwegian Theatres (De Norske Teatres forening).

He was married to painter and artist Karin Skagestad. He was the father of actors Tove Skagestad and Bjørn Skagestad.

== Awards ==
- Critics Theatre Prize (Teaterkritikerprisen) for the dramatization of Olav Duun's novel Ettermæle in 1976
- Honorary member of the Norwegian Theatre Leader Association (Norsk Teaterlederforening)
- Knight, First Order of the Royal Norwegian Order of St. Olav in 1975.

== Selected works ==
=== Poems ===
- Om fjellprofilan låg ei gullrand spent, 1946
- I natt skal mange våke, 1947
- Mørkt vatn glir mot havet, 1950
- Havdøgn, 1950

=== Plays ===
- Under treet ligg øksa, 1955
- Byen ved havet, 1962
- I gryet blir månen grå, 1966
- Det stig av hav, 1972
- Nora Helmer, 1982

=== Novel ===
- Hild Rogne, 1982
- På Rogne, 1983
- Farvel til Rogne, 1987

Cultural offices
Preceded by Nils Sletbak	Director of the Det Norske Teatret; 1961-1975	Succeeded by Svein Erik Brodal
Preceded by Svein Erik Brodal	Director of the Det Norske Teatret; 1976-1979	Succeeded by Svein Erik Brodal
