= Astrid Schwab =

Norwegian actress (1907–1997)

- Born: June 18, 1907; Kristiania (now Oslo), Norway
- Died: November 2, 1997 (aged 90)
- Occupation: Actress
- Spouse: Per Schwab (1937–1942)
- Father: Ole Leikvang

Astrid Schwab (née Leikvang, June 18, 1907 – November 2, 1997) was a Norwegian actress and stage director.

Schwab was born in Kristiania (now Oslo), the daughter of the actor Ole Leikvang. She made her artistic breakthrough in 1934 at the Ole Bull Theater in Bergen. Schwab was later employed at the National Theater in Bergen, except for a stay at the New Theater from 1935 to 1936. Her major roles included Inès in Jean-Paul Sartre's No Exit, Rebekka West in Henrik Ibsen's Rosmersholm, the mother in Ibsen's Brand, and Lavinia in Nils Kjær's Det lykkelige valg. Among her successful stagings were various pieces such as William Shakespeare's A Midsummer Night's Dream and Eugène Ionesco's Rhinoceros.

== Filmography ==
- 1932: Skjærgårdsflirt as Lily Andersen, Andersen's daughter
