= Svein Erik Brodal =

Norwegian theatre director

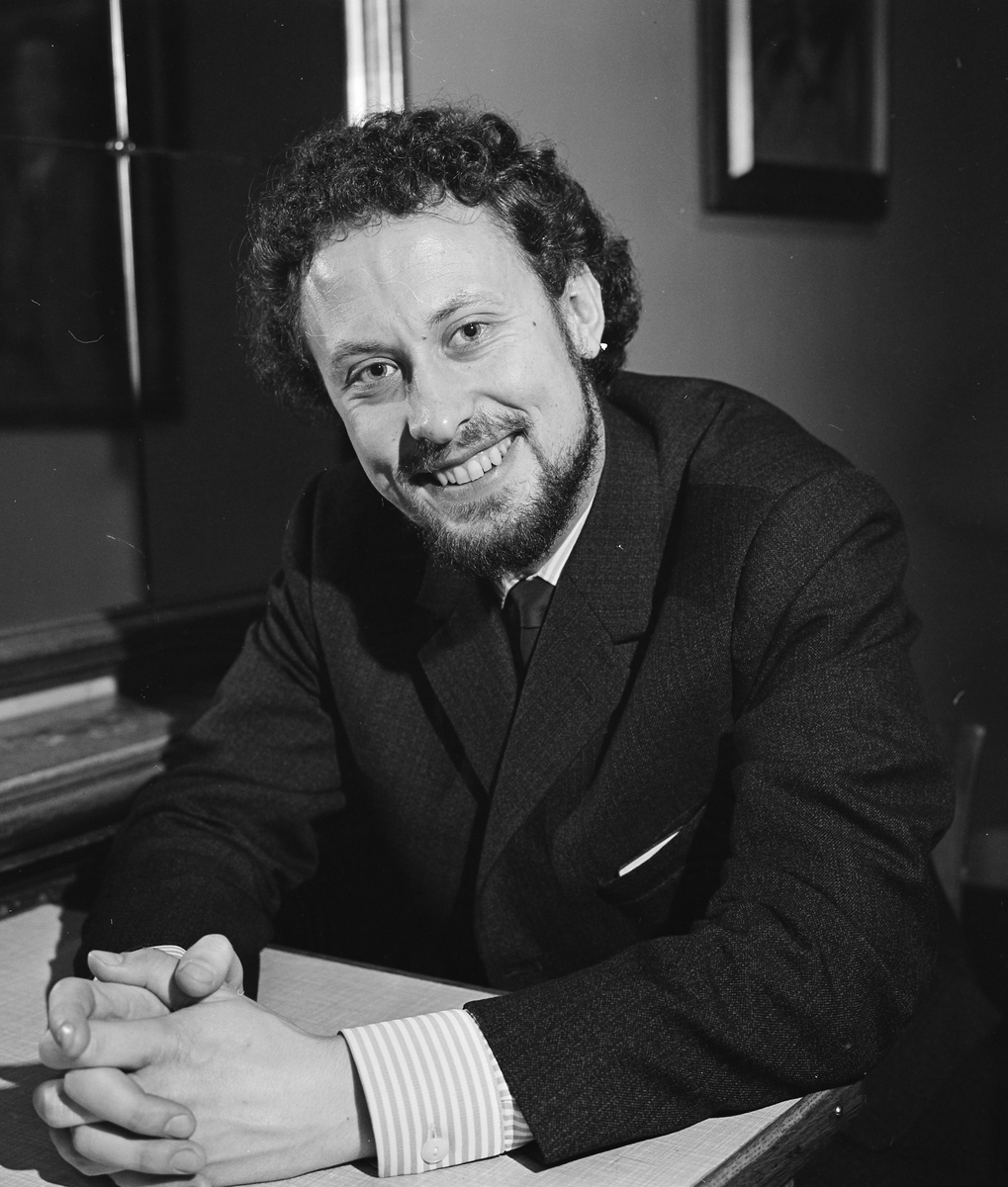
- Svein Erik Brodal in 1967
- Born: 21 February 1939 (age 87); Østre Toten, Norway
- Occupations: Poet; Novelist; Actor; Theatre director Politician

Svein Erik Brodal (born 21 February 1939 in Østre Toten Municipality, Oppland) is a Norwegian actor, theatre director, poet, novelist and politician. He made his stage debut at Det Norske Teatret in 1960, and served as theatre director from 1979 to 1990. He was a deputy representative to the Storting from 1997 to 2001.

Cultural offices
Preceded by Tormod Skagestad	Director of the Det Norske Teatret; 1975-1976	Succeeded by Tormod Skagestad
Preceded by Tormod Skagestad	Director of the Det Norske Teatret; 1979-1990	Succeeded by Otto Homlung
