= The Norwegian Writers' Center =

Norwegian writers' organization

The Norwegian Writers' Center (Norwegian: Norsk forfattersentrum) is an organization of Norwegian poets and fiction writers that encourages interactions among writers and the general public. It is funded by the Norwegian Ministry of Culture and Church Affairs and promotes literacy through poetry readings, public talks, conferences, presentations in schools, and cultural events. Writers resident in Norway having published at least one work of fiction and non-fiction (novels, poetry and children's books), are eligible for membership.

The Norwegian Writers' Center was established in 1968 under the initiative of the authors Einar Økland, Bjørn Nilsen and Tor Obrestad. Today the writer's center has over 900 author and has offices in Oslo, Bergen, Kristiansand Trondheim and Tromsø. The current leader since 2006 is Ingvild Christine Herzog.
