= Camilla Carlson =

Norwegian poet, novelist and literary critic

- Born: 28 January 1930; Arendal, Norway
- Died: 28 February 1990 (aged 60)
- Occupations: Poet, novelist and literary critic
- Spouse: Ståle Kyllingstad

Camilla Carlson (28 January 1930 – 28 February 1990) was a Norwegian poet, novelist and literary critic. Her literary debut was the poetry collection Sanden og havet from 1958. She was leader of the Norwegian Authors' Union from 1977 to 1981.

She was married to sculptor Ståle Kyllingstad.

Cultural offices
Preceded by Bjørn Nilsen	Chair of the Norwegian Authors' Union; 1977–1981	Succeeded by Johannes Heggland
