= Otto Homlung =

Norwegian stage producer and theatre director (1943–2025)

- Born: 19 July 1943; Oslo, German-occupied Norway
- Died: 7 May 2025 (aged 81)
- Occupations: Stage producer and theatre director

Otto Homlung (19 July 1943 – 7 May 2025) was a Norwegian stage producer and theatre director.

== Life and career ==
Homlung was born in Oslo on 19 July 1943. He worked as stage instructor at Den Nationale Scene from 1971 to 1973, and later as a freelance instructor for several Norwegian theatres. He was theatre director at Trøndelag Teater from 1984 to 1989, at Det Norske Teatret from 1990 to 1997, and again at Trøndelag Teater from 2005 to 2010.

Homlung died on 7 May 2025, at the age of 81.

Cultural offices
Preceded by Ola B. Johannessen	Director of the Trøndelag Teater; 1984–1989	Succeeded by Helle Ottesen
Preceded by Svein Erik Brodal	Director of Det Norske Teatret; 1990–1997	Succeeded by Vidar Sandem
Preceded by Catrine Telle	Director of the Trøndelag Teater; 2005–2009	Succeeded by Kristian Seltun
