= Lisbeth Longfrock =

1903 novel by Hans Aanrud

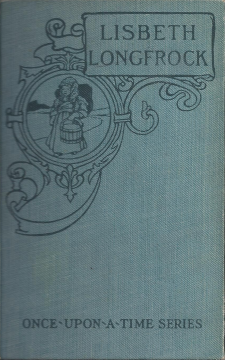
- Author: Hans Aanrud
- Publication date: 1907
- Text: Lisbeth Longfrock at Wikisource

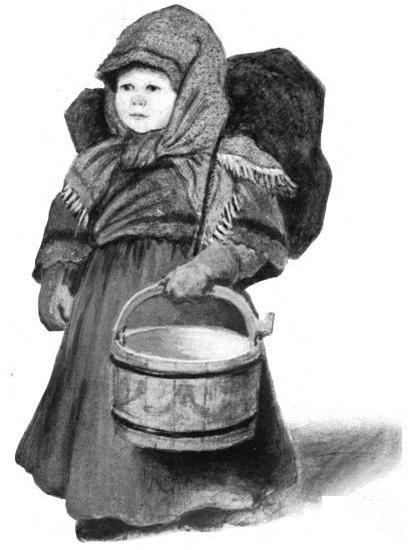
An illustration of the title character as a young girl, by Othar Holmboe.

Lisbeth Longfrock (Sidsel Sidsærk og andre kjærringemner ) is a classical work of Norwegian literature, by the author Hans Aanrud, published in 1903. It was translated into English in 1907 by Laura E. Poulsson, and illustrated by Norwegian artist Othar Holmboe. Aanrud's classic novel was translated again in 1935, under the title Sidsel Longskirt: A Girl of Norway. Illustrated by the famed artists Ingri and Edgar Parin d'Aulaire, this later translation was produced by The John C. Winston Company of Philadelphia.

== Plot ==
The story follows its title heroine, from childhood to confirmation. After her mother's death, Lisbeth (given the nickname Longskirt, or Sidsærk in the original Norwegian, because of her overlong skirt, a Christmas present given her by her brother) as she moves from her original home at New Ridge farm (called "Peerout Castle" for its fine view of the valley), to Hoel farm, one of the central farms of the area. Her brother, Jacob, also goes to Nordrum farm to become a herdsman there. At Hoel, Lisbeth is cared for by Kjersti Hoel, the farm's owner, who has made a promise to Lisbeth's mother before she died. Lisbeth works with livestock both at the farm, and at the seter (sæter in the book's transliteration), a mountain pasture used during the summertime. At the seter, Lisbeth meets two other herdsmen from neighboring farms, and spends the summer with them, getting to know them as she grows up.

The content of the book concerns the difficult conditions of the work of the country children who had to eke out a poor existence far away from their parents. In spite of this account of their hard lot an optimistic kind of portrayal is predominant.

== Style ==
The story, as is the case for most of Aanrud's tales, depicts an Eastern Norwegian environment, similar to the author's homeland in Gausdal. In its original publication, the book utilized local dialects, an effect lost in translation to English. Aanrud writes in omniscient third-person perspective, and depicts a rural community with the "harmonic realism" In his stories, farmers show a patriarchal care and kindness, and poor children get the space and opportunity to develop. The author emphasizes the depiction of nature, tradition on the farm and the healthy characteristics such as job satisfaction and sense of duty. An undercurrent of sensitivity appears in the chapter where Lisbeth and her brother meet a year after her mother's death.

Aanrud gained fame by his realistic and folksy descriptions of the rural life of his home valley before the industrial age. The way of thinking of the ordinary peasants is presented in partly dialect dialogues and in their simple and friendly mode of expression. The landscape is atmospherically described and most parts of the stories are humorous; there are sometimes also tragic features. The characters, plot and description of the landscape always form an integrated whole. Often children are the protagonists of Aanrud's stories, which therefore became popular children’s books. But Aanrud himself had intended his tales for older readers.

A street in Oslo, Sidsel Sidsærks vei, bears the name of this well-known book.
