= Sigmund Løvåsen =

Norwegian novelist and playwright (born 1977)

- Born: 16 August 1977 (age 49); Trysil Municipality, Norway
- Occupations: Novelist and playwright
- Awards: Tarjei Vesaas' debutantpris (2003)

Sigmund Løvåsen (born 16 August 1977) is a Norwegian novelist and playwright. He chaired the Norwegian Authors' Union from 2012 to 2017, and has chaired the Arts Council Norway since 2022.

== Career ==
Løvåsen was born in Trysil Municipality, and studied in Volda, Bø and Gothenburg. He made his literary début in 2003 with the novel Nyryddinga, for which he was awarded the Tarjei Vesaas' debutantpris. In 2006 he published the novel Brakk, and in 2009 the novel Mamselle Iversen. His plays include Daga from 2004, Vente på fugl (2009) and Vid din sida (2011). In 2020 he issued a biography of Kjell Aukrust.

Løvåsen was awarded the Bjørnson Endowment in 2010.

He was leader of the Norwegian Authors' Union from 2012 to 2017, and was appointed chair of the Arts Council Norway from 2022.

Cultural offices
Preceded by Anne Oterholm	Chair of the Norwegian Authors' Union; 2012–2017	Succeeded by Heidi Marie Kriznik
