= Brynjulf Jung Tjønn =

Norwegian writer

- Born: 15 November 1980 (age 45); Seoul, South Korea
- Occupations: Journalist; Writer

Brynjulf Jung Tjønn (born 15 November 1980) is a Norwegian journalist and writer.

== Personal life ==
Tjønn was born in Seoul, South Korea, on 15 November 1980. Adopted to Norway, he grew up in Feios in Sogn.

== Literary career ==
Tjønn made his book debut in 2002, with the novel Eg kom for å elske. He received the Brage Prize in 2013 for his novel for young adults, Så vakker du er.

For his poetry collection Kvit norsk mann he was awarded the Norwegian Critics Prize for Literature in 2022.

He chaired the Norwegian Authors' Union from 2023 to 2024, when he was succeeded by Bjørn Vatne.

Cultural offices
Preceded by Heidi Marie Kriznik	Chair of the Norwegian Authors' Union; 2023–2024	Succeeded by Bjørn Vatne
