= Heidi Marie Kriznik =

Norwegian novelist (born 1970)

- Born: 23 February 1970 (age 56)
- Occupation: Novelist
- Organization: Norwegian Authors' Union

Heidi Marie Kriznik (born 23 February 1970) is a Norwegian novelist. She served as chair of the Norwegian Authors' Union from 2017 to 2023.

== Career ==
Kriznik made her literary début in 2002 with the novel Applaus, for which she was awarded the Tarjei Vesaas' debutantpris. In 2007 she published the novel Borte en vinter, and her next novel from 2012 was Du kan sove her. She was elected chairman of the board of the Norwegian Authors' Union for three periods, from in 2017 to 2023.

== Personal life ==
Kriznik was born on 23 February 1970, and resides in Oslo.

Cultural offices
Preceded by Sigmund Løvåsen	Chair of the Norwegian Authors' Union; 2017–2023	Succeeded by Brynjulf Jung Tjønn
