= Ståle Kyllingstad =

Norwegian sculptor and designer

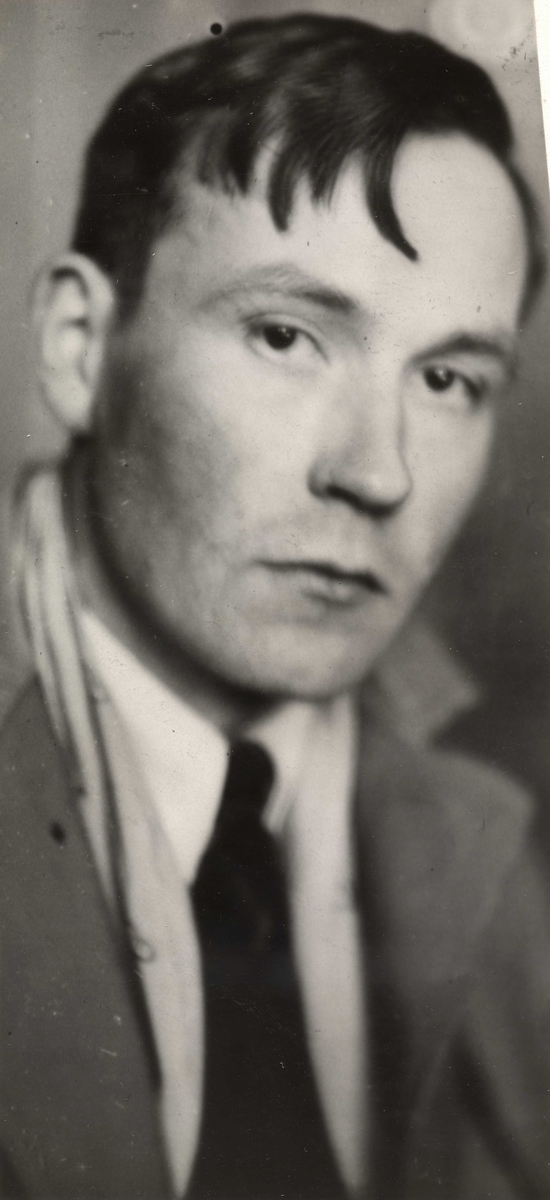
- Born: 7 November 1903; Kvinesdal Municipality, Norway
- Died: 26 November 1987 (aged 84)
- Occupations: Sculptor and designer
- Spouse: Camilla Carlson

Ståle Kyllingstad (7 November 1903 – 26 November 1987) was a Norwegian sculptor and designer. He was born in Kvinesdal Municipality; the son of farmers Retsius Kyllingstad and Tale Katrine Røinestad. He was married to writer Camilla Carlson. Kyllingstad is known for his war memorials, and for his designs for Hadeland Glassverk. He is represented in the National Gallery of Norway with the statuette Okse from 1956, and a head sculpture of Finn Carling.
