= Axel Heiberg (judge) =

Norwegian judge (1908–1988)

Axel Heiberg (1908–1988) was a Norwegian judge.

He was a son of barrister Axel Heiberg (1875–1952), brother of Bernt and Edvard Heiberg, nephew of Eivind Heiberg, first cousin of Hans Heiberg and a first cousin once removed of Gustav, Jacob, Gunnar and Inge Heiberg.

He worked as a lawyer from 1935, and became a prosecutor in Oslo District Court in 1946. He was also working with the legal purge in Norway after World War II, and was involved in the Norwegian Bar Association.

In 1952 he was named as a Supreme Court Justice, and he stood in this position until his retirement in 1978. He also served as leader of the Norwegian Association of Judges, and co-founded and edited the academic journal Lov og Rett. He died in 1988.
