= Hans Heiberg =

Norwegian writer and director

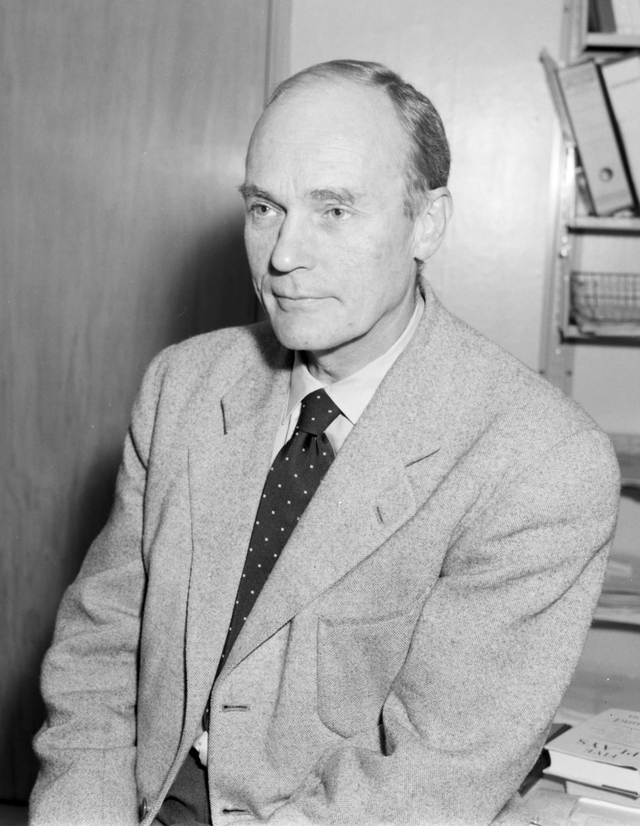
- Hans Heiberg in 1954
- Born: 28 January 1904; Kristiania, Norway
- Died: 6 December 1978 (aged 74)
- Occupations: Journalist; literary critic; theatre critic; essayist; novelist; playwright; translator; theatre director
- Parent: Jacob Vilhelm Rode Heiberg
- Awards: Arts Council Norway Honorary Award (1973); Order of St Olav (1973); Fritt Ord Honorary Award (1979; posthumously)

Hans Heiberg (28 January 1904 – 6 December 1978) was a Norwegian journalist, literary critic, theatre critic, essayist, novelist, playwright, translator and theatre director.

== Early and personal life ==
Heiberg was born in Kristiania as son of city manager Jacob Vilhelm Rode Heiberg (1860–1946) and Christiane Jeanette Aimée Dedichen. He was married to Alette Elisabeth Wiland from 1929 to her death in 1941, and to nurse Sigrid Berner Høy from 1942. He was a nephew of playwright and theatre director Gunnar Heiberg, physician Inge Heiberg and psychiatrist Henrik Dedichen, and a second cousin of Supreme Court Justice Axel Heiberg, architect Bernt Heiberg and railway director Edvard Heiberg.

== Career ==
Heiberg finished his secondary education in 1922, and finished his law studies with the cand.jur. degree in 1927. He worked as a foreign correspondent for Dagbladet and Arbeiderbladet, in Great Britain and Ireland in 1929, in Finland in 1930, in Japan and China in 1932, and in Paris from 1938 to 1939. He worked as a literary critic and theatre critic for Arbeiderbladet between 1931 and 1940.

During the late phase of the occupation of Norway by Nazi Germany he was arrested in Lillehammer and sent to Grini concentration camp. He arrived at Grini on 4 May 1945, only days before Germany's capitulation and the liberation of the camp.

After the war he was a literary critic and theatre critic for Verdens Gang from 1945 to 1952. He was employed by the Norwegian Broadcasting Corporation as theatre director for Radioteatret from 1952 to 1973. He was a member of Norges Kunstnerråd from 1946 to 1949 and from 1956 to 1961, and of the Arts Council Norway from 1965 to 1972. He was chairman of the Norwegian Authors' Union from 1946 to 1965. He was chairman of the board for Riksteatret from 1949 to 1968. He was chairman for Teater- og musikkritikerlaget from 1947 to 1949, De norske teatres forening from 1962 to 1964 and Norsk Teaterunion from 1961 to 1967.

He translated more than two hundred novels and plays into Norwegian language. One of his translations was the radio play Dickie Dick Dickens, which was elected "All-time radio play" by Norwegian radio listeners in 2001. Among his literary works are the satirical novels Gutten i jacket (1931) and Ta den ring og la den vandre – (1934). He wrote the two plays Broen (1945) and Minnefesten (1946). A selection of his literary critics was issued in Peilinger (1950). He wrote a biography on Henrik Ibsen in 1967, and a biography on Henrik Wergeland in 1972. He received the Arts Council Norway Honorary Award in 1973, and became Commander of the Royal Norwegian Order of St. Olav in 1973. In 1979 he posthumously received the Fritt Ord Honorary Award.

Cultural offices
Preceded by Jens Gunderssen	Director of Radioteatret; 1952–1973	Succeeded by Gerhard Knoop
Awards
Preceded by Klaus Egge	Recipient of the Norsk kulturråds ærespris 1973	Succeeded by Hans Jonas Henriksen
