= Inge Heiberg =

Norwegian physician

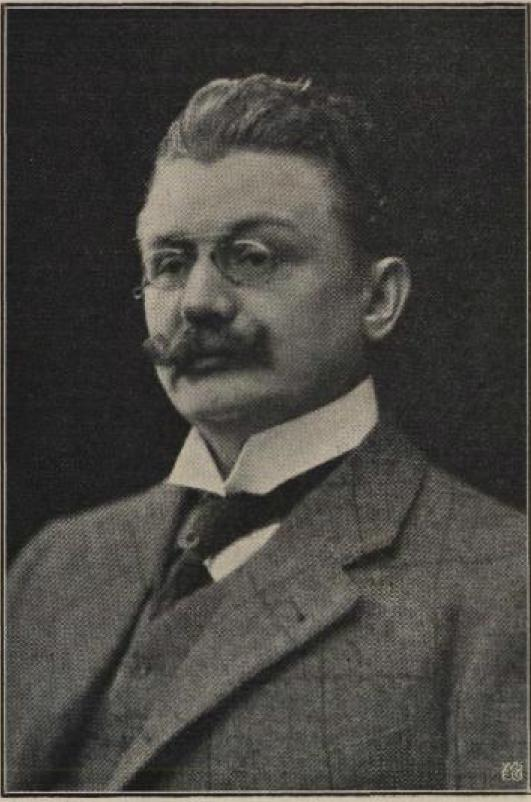
Inge Heiberg

Inge Valdemar Heiberg (11 October 1861 – 1 July 1920) was a Norwegian physician who served as director of medicine in Belgian Congo from 1911 to 1920.

He was born in Christiania as a son of judge Edvard Omsen Heiberg (1829–1884) and Minna Rode (1836–1917). He was a brother of Gunnar and Jakob Vilhelm Rode Heiberg, as well as a first cousin of Eivind and Gustav Adolf Lammers Heiberg and a first cousin once removed of Bernt, Axel and Edvard Heiberg, and uncle of Hans Heiberg.

He took the examen artium in 1879 and enrolled in medicine studies. After leading a social life among the "Kristiania bohême", being engaged to Bokken Lasson for some years, he graduated with the cand.med. degree in 1893. He tried his luck as a general practitioner in Aalesund, but quit after three years. He was hired as a physician in Congo Free State (from 1908: Belgian Congo) in 1897, and remained here until 1920, except for a study leave at the Liverpool School of Tropical Medicine (LSTM) in 1902–03.

He assisted an LSTM team that arrived in the Congo Free State on 23 September 1903 to assess public health, and sleeping sickness (African trypanosomiasis) in particular. The members were Cuthbert Christy, Joseph Everett Dutton and John Lancelot Todd. The team spent nine months in the Lower Congo, then on 30 June 1904 began investigating upstream as far as Kasongo. In Congo, he lived in Lado and Ibembo before moving to Boma when promoted to Médicin en chef (director of medicine) in 1911. Among his professional endeavors was to fight the "sleeping sickness", but he also believed a certain degree of corporal punishment of the natives to be necessary as a part of disciplining and civilizing.

He was also a benefactor and item collector for the Ethnographic Museum in Norway's capital. He also contributed to a lesser degree to the Zoological Museum. For his contributions, he was decorated as a Knight, First Class of the Order of St. Olav in 1908.

He was unmarried. In 1920 he retired, and moved home to Norway where he died the same year.
