= Heideberg (Grevesmühlen) =

Hill in Germany

- Location within Mecklenburg-Vorpommern

Highest point
- Elevation: 112.8 m above sea level (NHN) (370 ft)
- Coordinates: 53°52′40″N 11°17′05″E

Geography
- Location: Mecklenburg-Vorpommern, Germany

The Heideberg is a hill reaching up to 112.8 m above sea level (NHN), in the district of Nordwestmecklenburg, in the German state of Mecklenburg-Vorpommern. It is one of the highest points in the district.

The wooded rise is located on the outskirts of the municipality of Grevesmühlen, about six kilometres south of the Baltic Sea coast and the Wohlenberger Wiek bay. It is just under 7 kilometres east of Grevesmühlen and rises immediately north of Barendorf. It is part of a ridge that runs from Grevesmühlen almost as far as Wismar.

The hill offers a view of the Baltic. In the vicinity of the hill there are also important gravesites from the Stone and Bronze Ages.
