= Gunnar Heiberg =

Norwegian poet, playwright, journalist and theatre critic

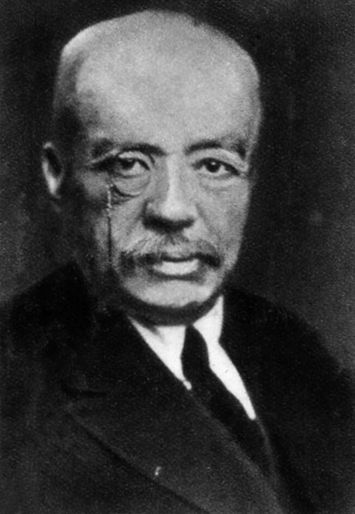
- Heiberg, c. 1928
- Born: 18 November 1857; Christiania, Norway
- Died: 22 February 1929 (aged 71); Oslo, Norway
- Resting place: Vestre gravlund
- Spouses: Didrikke Heiberg (m. 1885; div. 1896) Birgit Friis Stoltz Blehr (m. 1911)
- Writing career
- Period: 1884–1929

Gunnar Edvard Rode Heiberg (18 November 1857 – 22 February 1929) was a Norwegian poet, playwright, journalist and theatre critic.

== Personal life ==
He was born in Christiania a son of judge Edvard Omsen Heiberg (1829–1884) and his wife Minna (Vilhelmine) Rode (8 June 1836 – 1917). He was a brother of Jacob, Anton and Inge Heiberg, as well as an uncle of Hans Heiberg, first cousin of Eivind Heiberg, Gustav Adolf Lammers Heiberg Helge Rode and Kristofer Hansteen, a first cousin once removed of Bernt, Axel and Edvard Heiberg and a second cousin of Jean Heiberg.

He was married to actress Didrikke Tollefsen (1863–1915), whom he met in Bergen, between 1 April 1885 and 1896. On 15 April 1911 he married Birgit Friis Stoltz Blehr (1880–1933). Through his second wife's sister he was a brother-in-law of Sigurd Bødtker.

== Career ==
Heiberg finished his secondary education in 1874, and enrolled in law studies. Having befriended Gerhard Gran, he came under the influence of Charles Darwin, Georg Brandes and Johan Sverdrup. He became a cultural radical, and made his debut as a poet in 1878. In the autumn that year he spent time in Rome, together with Henrik Ibsen and Jens Peter Jacobsen. His first play Tante Ulrikke was written from 1877, finally printed in 1884, but not staged until 1901. His first play to reach the stage was Kong Midas, premiéring in Copenhagen's Royal Danish Theatre in 1890.

From 1880 to 1882 he worked as a journalist in Dagbladet. He was subsequently a journalist in Verdens Gang from 1896 to 1903, and Paris correspondent for that newspaper from 1897 to 1901 (during the Dreyfus case, among others). He was also a theatre critic. From 1884 to 1888, he was the artistic director of the theatre Den Nationale Scene in Bergen. He resigned when the theatre director and board refused to stage Bjørnstjerne Bjørnson's play Kongen. His best-known plays are Balkonen (The Balcony, 1894) and Kjærlighedens Tragedie (The Tragedy of Love, 1904).

=== Anti-Swedish sentiments ===
Heiberg was hostile to Oscar II, King in the personal union between Sweden and Norway. In 1896 he wrote the book Hs. Majestæt, originally published as a series of articles in Verdens Gang. The book was highly critical towards Oscar II, stemming from a news story that the King, when processioning in Støren, had personally knocked the hat off a farmer's head. When the book was printed, the publishing company Olaf Norlis Forlag did not dare to put its name on the cover page. Not long after, the publishing house was threatened with legal steps. Nearly all of the 1,100 copies were annihilated in self-censorship.

In 1905 Heiberg stood forward as an agitator for the dissolution of the union between Norway and Sweden. At the 16 January 1905 première of Kjærlighedens Tragedie Heiberg held a speech against the union, stating that a peaceful continuation of the present conditions between Sweden and Norway was impossible. Heiberg was adamant that the only acceptable solution would be a free and independent Norwegian state, and that no compromise could be made in that regard. Present at the event was the former (1900–1902) Liberal Party of Norway Minister of Defence Georg Stang, whom Heiberg greatly admired for his work on the construction of many of the defensive fortifications along the Norwegian–Swedish border. After the completion of his speech Heiberg walked across the room to where Colonel Stang was seated, toasted him, put his arm around Stang's neck and exclaimed: "I love you". The dissolution went through, but Heiberg also opposed the Karlstad Treaty, the conditions of which he found "humiliating". One of Heiberg's main points of contention with the Karlstad Treaty was the Norwegian acceptance to dismantle the border fortifications, writing in Dagbladet 13 September 1905 that "an honourable war is far less dank and sickening than a dishonourable peace". (Note: Norwegian: En hederlig krig er adskillig mindre lummer og pestbringende enn en uhederlig fred. Norland 2004: 230) Also, as a republican he did not want a new monarchy to ascend the throne; this happened following the Norwegian monarchy plebiscite, 1905. Collected speeches about all these topics were published in 1923 under the title 1905. In 1912 Heiberg attacked Christian Michelsen, a republican who worked to dissolve the union but advocated monarchy, in the play Jeg vil værge mit land. (I will/want to defend my country)

From 1923 he received a writer's grant from the state. He died in November 1929 in Oslo, and is buried at Vestre gravlund.
