= Jacob Hilditch =

Norwegian writer

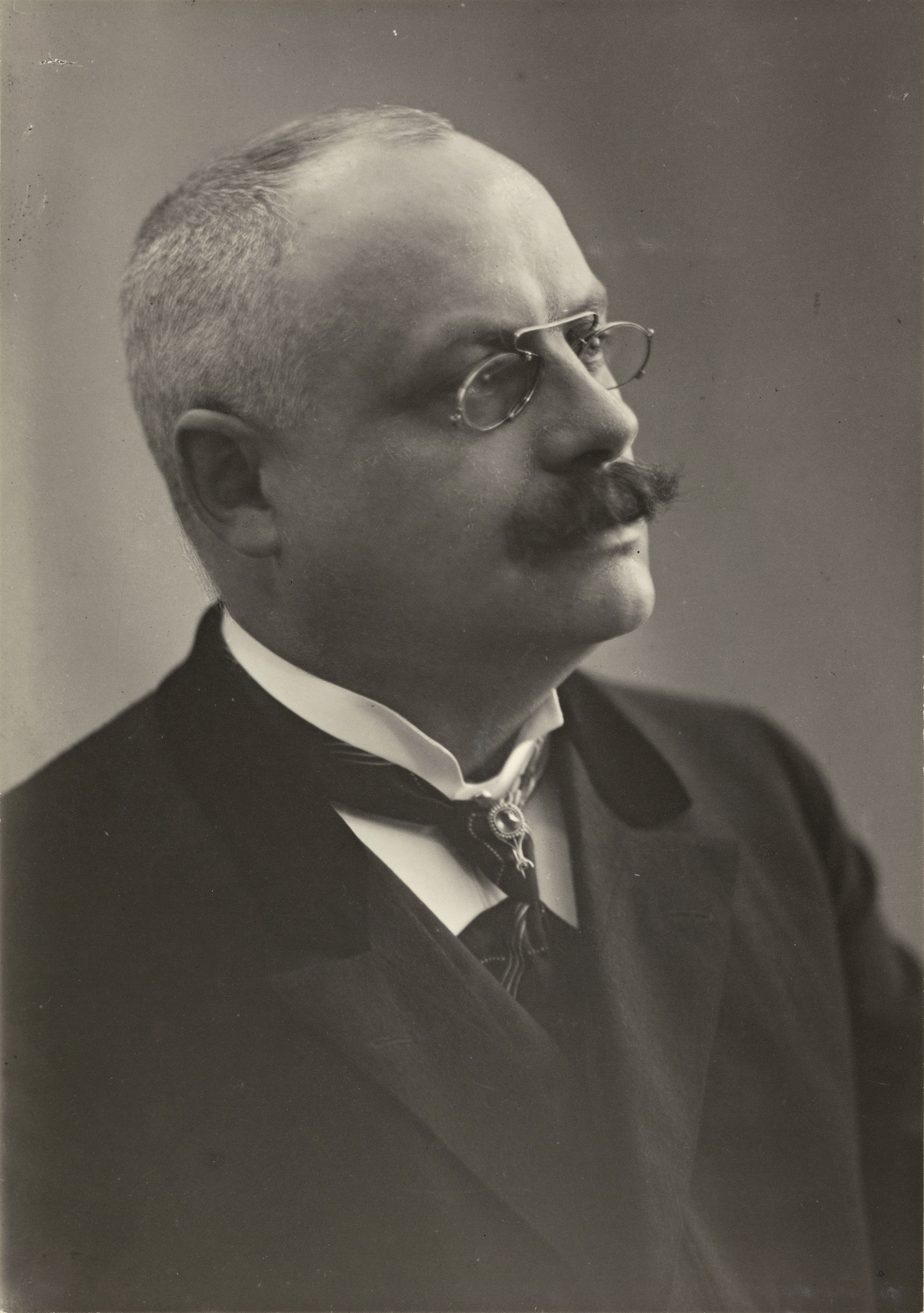
Jacob Hilditch

Jacob Hilditch (20 January 1864 – 1 June 1930) was a Norwegian writer. His literary debut was the short story collection Under norsk Flag from 1889. He is particularly known for the three volumes of Trangvikposten, 1900 to 1907. He was a co-founder of the Norwegian Authors' Union, and leader for two periods, from 1896 to 1900, and from 1908 to 1910.
