= Heiberg, Minnesota =

Heiberg
- Unincorporated community
- Location within Minnesota Location within the United States
- Coordinates: 47°16′59″N 96°16′33″W
- Country: United States
- State: Minnesota
- County: Norman
- Elevation: 1,007 ft (307 m)
- Time zone: UTC-6 (Central (CST))
  - Summer (DST): UTC-5 (CDT)
- Area code: 218
- GNIS feature ID: 654751

Heiberg is an unincorporated community in Norman County, in the U.S. state of Minnesota.

== History ==
A post office was established at Heiberg in 1888, and remained in operation until it was discontinued in 1916. The community was named for Jorgen F. Heiberg, the owner of a local gristmill.
