= Ole Lie Singdahlsen =

Norwegian civil servant and writer

Ole Christopher Lie Singdahlsen (24 October 1877 – 10 April 1926) was a Norwegian civil servant and writer.

He was born in Larvik. He debuted in 1901 with the work Ada. Notable later works include stories from Hallingdal: Hallinger (1915), Fjeldfolk (1917) and Folket fra Aslegaard (1918), and stories from life as a civil servant: Medaljen (1921) and Kolleger (1923)
