= The Ice Palace (novel) =

1963 novel by Tarjei Vesaas

- First English-language edition
- Author: Tarjei Vesaas
- Language: nynorsk
- Published: 1963
- Publisher: Gyldendal Norsk Forlag, Peter Owen Publishers
- Publication place: Norway
- English publication date: 1966
- Awards: Nordic Council's Literature Prize of 1964

The Ice Palace (Nynorsk: Is-slottet) is a novel by the Norwegian author Tarjei Vesaas, first published in 1963. An English translation was published by Peter Owen Publishers, London. It and was scheduled for reissue with them in Christmas of 2017 was part of their Cased Classics series. Vesaas received The Nordic Council's Literature Prize for the novel in 1964.

== Plot ==
The vivacious 11-year-old Siss lives in a rural community in Norway. Her life is changed when a quiet girl, Unn, moves to the village to live with her aunt after the death of her unmarried mother. Siss and Unn can't wait to meet. They finally do, at Unn's house. They talk for a while, Unn shows Siss a picture from the family album of her father, then Unn persuades Siss that they should undress, just for fun. They do, watching each other, and Unn asks whether Siss can see if she is different. Siss says no, she can't, and Unn says she has a secret and is afraid she will not go to heaven. Soon they dress again, and the situation is awkward. Siss leaves Unn and runs home, overwhelmed by fear of the dark.

Unn does not want to feel embarrassed when meeting Siss the next day, so she decides to skip school and instead goes to see the ice castle that has been created by a nearby waterfall. Ice castles are normal in cold winters, when the water freezes into huge structures around waterfalls. Unn climbs into this ice castle, exploring the rooms and baffled by its beauty. In the seventh room, she gets disoriented and cannot find her way out. Eventually, she begins to see an eye in the ice and, tired, falls asleep.

When the search for Unn remains fruitless, people wonder if Siss knows more about the disappearance than she lets on. They wonder what had passed between them the night before. Siss for her part is overwhelmed by loss and loneliness, and she makes a promise that she will never forget Unn. Therefore, Siss takes upon herself the role Unn had: standing alone in the school yard refusing to play or speak. Thus, she has to find her way out of her own emotional ice castle, before she can continue on the road towards adolescence and adulthood.

== Film version ==
The film starred 12-year-olds Line Storesund as Siss and Hilde Nyeggen Martinsen as Unn. It was directed by Per Blom in 1987, who was awarded the Grand Prix at the Flanders International Film Festival in 1988. The film focuses slightly more on Unn's secret feelings than the novel, but otherwise it's very true to the book, with the same slow snow-laden pace. The film had its first release on VHS (PAL) in 1991. This is no longer available and an official DVD release has yet to emerge. But the film has circulated as bootleg DVDs and downloads.

== Editions ==
=== Norwegian (nynorsk) ===
- Is-slottet. - Oslo : Gyldendal, 1982. - 140 p. - (Lanterne; 153). - ISBN 82-05-00769-1 (paperback)
- Is-slottet. - Oslo : Gyldendal, 1985. - 140 p. - (De nye klassikerne). - ISBN 82-05-16495-9 (paperback)
- Is-slottet. - Oslo : Ariel lydbokforl., 1992. - (Ariel's lydbøker) - ISBN 82-7509-022-9 (audio book)
- Is-slottet. - Oslo : Gyldendal, 1995. - 140 p. - (Gyldendal pocket). - ISBN 82-05-25233-5 (paperback)
- Is-slottet : roman. - Oslo : Gyldendal, 1997. - 140 p. - ISBN 82-05-25233-5 (paperback)
- Kimen; Fuglane; Is-slottet. - Oslo : Gyldendal, 1988. - 509 p. (Norske klassikere). - ISBN 82-05-17630-2 (hardcover)
- Is-slottet. - Oslo : De norske bokklubbene, 2002. - 124 p. - (Århundrets bibliotek) - ISBN 82-525-5096-7 (hardcover)
- Vesaas' beste. - Oslo : Gyldendal, 2006. - 617 p. - (Forfatternes beste). - Contains the three novels Kimen, Fuglane and Is-slottet as well as selected short stories and poems. - ISBN 82-05-34894-4 (hardcover)

=== English ===
- The Ice Palace / translated by Elizabeth Rokkan. - First edition of first English translation. - London: Peter Owen Publishers, 1966. - 176 pp. (hardcover)
- The Ice Palace / translated by Elizabeth Rokkan. - New ed. - London: Peter Owen Publishers, 1993. - 176 pp. - ISBN 0-7206-0881-3 (hardcover)
- The Ice Palace / translated by Elizabeth Rokkan. - New ed. - London: Peter Owen Publishers, 2002. - 176 pp. - ISBN 0-7206-1122-9 (paperback)
- The Ice Palace / translated by Elizabeth Rokkan. - New ed. - London: Peter Owen Publishers, 2009. - 176 pp. - ISBN 978-0-7206-1329-2 (paperback)

=== Spanish ===
- El Palacio de Hielo / translated by Kirsti Baggethun Kristensen and Asunción Lorenzo Torres. - New ed. - Ediciones Bruguera, 2007. - 208 pp. - ISBN 978-84-02-42014-5 (paperback)
