= Heimberg =

Heimberg may refer to:

== Places ==
=== In Germany ===
- Heimberg, Saxony-Anhalt, Saxony-Anhalt
- Heimberg, Baden-Württemberg, in the municipality of Niederstetten, Baden-Württemberg
- Heimberg (Deuerling), in the municipality of Regensburg, Bavaria
- Heimberg (Fischach), in the municipality of Augsburg, Bavaria
- Heimberg (Irschenberg), in the municipality of Miesbach, Bavaria
- Heimberg (Oberbergkirchen), in the municipality of Mühldorf, Bavaria

=== In other countries ===
- Heimberg, Switzerland, in the Canton of Bern
- Heimberg, Austria, in Haag, Lower Austria

== People with the surname ==
- Alex Heimberg, also known as Miss Understood, New York drag queen
- Lothar Heimberg, an early member of the band Scorpions
- Michelle Heimberg (born 2000), Swiss diver
- Murray Heimberg (1925–2025), American research and clinical pharmacologist
