= Hans Aanrud =

Norwegian author (1863–1953)

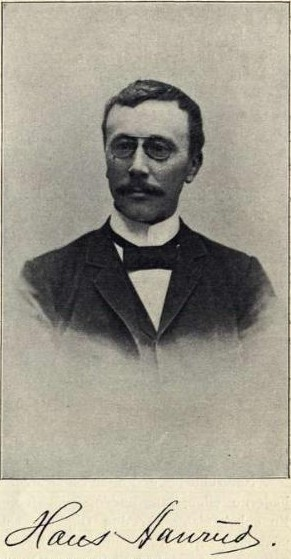
Hans Aanrud

Hans Aanrud (3 September 1863 – 11 January 1953) was a Norwegian writer. He wrote plays, poetry, and stories depicting rural life in his native Gudbrandsdal, Norway.

== Life ==
Aanrud, who came from a rural family, was born and raised in Auggedalen, a valley in Gausdal (part of Gudbrandsdal). He attended a grammar school and then practised as a private tutor. When he had some success with his literary works he moved to Oslo. There he was a literary and theatre critic. From 1911 to 1923 he was also an adviser at the national theatre of Oslo.

== Works ==
Chambers Biographical Dictionary says "His delightful children's books... deserve their place among the classics".

Aanrud gained fame by his realistic and folksy descriptions of the rural life of his home valley before the industrial age. The way of thinking of the ordinary peasants is presented in partly dialect dialogues and in their simple and friendly mode of expression. The landscape is atmospherically described and most parts of the stories are humorous; there are only sometimes also tragic features. The characters, plot and description of the landscape always form an integrated whole. Often children are the protagonists of Aanruds stories which therefore became popular children's books. But Aanrud himself had intended his tales for older readers. These tales were soon translated and found wide distribution especially in the rest of Scandinavia, Great Britain and Germany.

One of the most successful tales by Aanrud is his depiction of Sidsel Sidsærk (1903), a young Norwegian shepherdess who receives her epithet long skirt because of her much too long skirt, a Christmas present of her brother. The tale of the young shepherd Sölve Solfeng (1910), who lives in a valley in Norway, was also widespread. The content of both stories concerns the difficult conditions of the work of the country children who had to eke out a poor existence far away from their parents. In spite of this account of their hard lot an optimistic kind of portrayal is predominant.

Two translations of shorter stories by Aanrud also achieved great fame in Germany: the tale collections Kroppzeug (1907) and Jungen (1910).

The lower middle-class life in the city was also examined by Aanrud in some comedies in a satirical way, but these comedies were mainly known only in the Norwegian capital and are today nearly forgotten. In the comedy Storken (= stork, 1895), that is playing in Kristiania (the former name of Oslo) at the end of the 19th century, a naïve clerk tries to establish contacts to the high society but he is often deceived by a royal authorized representative, who takes advantage of his ignorance. Only at the end the clerk finds out the truth. In this comedy Aanrud mocks at affected and mendacious behaviour. He wanted a positive influence of the healthy rural world on the city life that he regarded as degenerate and rootless; in the end he wanted the rapprochement of the rural and the urban culture.

Aanrud's works include:

- Storken, 1895
- En Vinternat og andre Fortællinger, 1896
- Hanen, 1898
- Sidsel Sidsærk (translated into English as Lisbeth Longfrock), 1903
- Sølve Solfeng, 1910
- Fortællinger for Barn, 1917
- Sølve Suntrap, 1926
- Collected works, 6 volumes, 1914-1915; 3 volumes, 1943

Cultural offices
Preceded by Olaf Hansson	Director of the Den Nationale Scene; 1899–1900	Succeeded by Gustav Thomassen
