= Thora Neels-Hansson =

Norwegian actress (1918–2007)

Thora Elisabeth Neels-Hansson (also known as Nøste Schwab) (November 29, 1918 – December 15, 2007) was a Norwegian actress.

Thora Elisabeth Neels-Hansson was born in Stavanger, Norway, on November 29, 1918. She was best known for her role as Antoinette (Nette) Bals in the classic Norwegian movie Tante Pose from 1940. She was the daughter of Gunnar Neels-Hansson, and she married Per Schwab in 1944. They had two children, one of whom is the production designer Tine Schwab. Thora Neels-Hansson died on December 15, 2007, in Oslo, Norway.
