= Norwegian Writers for Children =

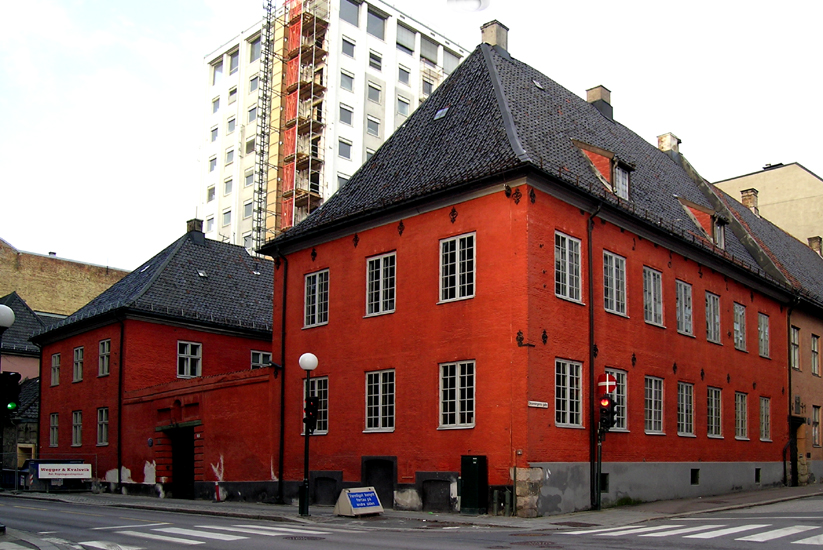
Rådhusgata 7, Oslo serves as offices for the Norwegian Writers for Children, the Norwegian Authors' Union, the Norwegian Critics' Association and the Writers' Guild of Norway.

The Norwegian Writers for Children (Norwegian: Norske Barne- og Ungdomsbokforfattere, NBU) was founded in 1947. The association, composed of authors who write fiction for children and young people, promotes the interests of writers of books for children and young people and encourages literature for children and young people. NBU has almost 300 members.
