= Writers' Guild of Norway =

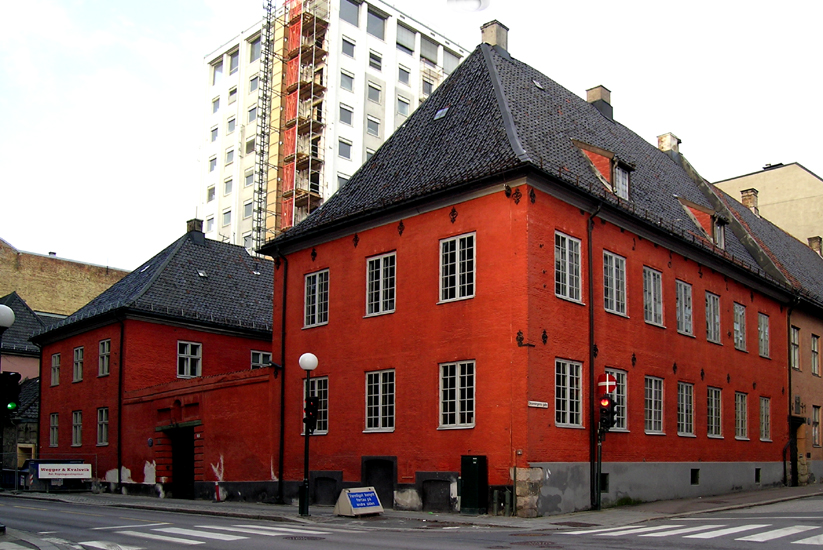
Rådhusgata 7, Oslo serves as offices for the Norwegian Authors' Union, the Norwegian Critics' Association, the Norwegian Writers for Children and the Writers' Guild of Norway.

The Writers' Guild of Norway (Norwegian: Norske Dramatikeres Forbund) is an association of Norwegian dramatists and playwrights. It was established in 1938, to protect Norwegian playwrights' professional and economic interests. In 2007 the association had around 250 members.
