= Per Blom (director) =

Norwegian film director

- Born: 5 May 1946; Søndre Land, Norway
- Died: 13 February 2013 (aged 66)
- Occupation: Film director

Per Blom (5 May 1946 – 13 February 2013) was a Norwegian film director.

He was born in Søndre Land Municipality.

Among his films are Anton from 1973, and Mors hus from 1974, based on a novel by Knut Faldbakken. Further Kvinner from 1979, Sølvmunn from 1981, and The Ice Palace from 1987, based upon a novel by Tarjei Vesaas.
