= Hotel Christiania Teater =

Hospitality companies of Norway

- Location within Norway

General information
- Location: Stortingsgata 16; Oslo
- Coordinates: 59.9135°N 10.7337°E
- Opening: 2010
- Owner: Petter Stordalen
- Operator: Nordic Hotels & Resorts

Technical details
- Floor count: 7 (restaurant: Teatro; bars: Teatro wine bar)

Design and construction
- Other designers: Annemone Wille Waage

Other information
- Number of rooms: 102
- Parking: Public street parking nearby

Website
- www.christianiateater.com

Hotel Christiania Teater is a historic hotel in Oslo, Norway. It was established in 2010 in a landmark structure built in 1918, known primarily for the notability of its theater inside the hotel and recently its unique hotel design by Annemone Wille Waage. The 102-unit hotel is located in Stortingsgata 16, next to Spikersuppa and the main pedestrian street Karl Johans gate with the Royal Palace on one side and the parliament on the other side, around the corner of the building is the Oslo City Hall, and just in front of the building the National Theatre. The hotel building has been on the National Register of Historic Places since 2015.

== History ==
The building was completed in 1918 as the Opera Comique in a post-modern Nordic Renaissance style, drawn by the architect Henry Fearnley Coll, in a joint venture with the Danish architect Hack Kampmann. Hack was also known for Marselisborg Palace, and Ny Carlsberg Glyptotek, and museums in Copenhagen.

In 1921, it was converted to the Casino, a theater hosting revue shows. It became a cinema in 1928 and was badly damaged by a fire in 1931 and rebuilt in Nordic Neo-Renaissance style to designs by Henry Fearnley Coll and Hack Kampmann. During the German occupation, it operated as a propaganda cinema, Die Deutches Theater. From 1945-1985, it housed Det Norske Teateret. It was converted back to a cinema in 1985 and renamed Filmteateret. In 2006, it was renamed Christiania Teater. It was converted to a DoubleTree by Hilton hotel in 2006, and then in 2014 was renamed Hotel Christiania Teater. It was renovated in 2023.

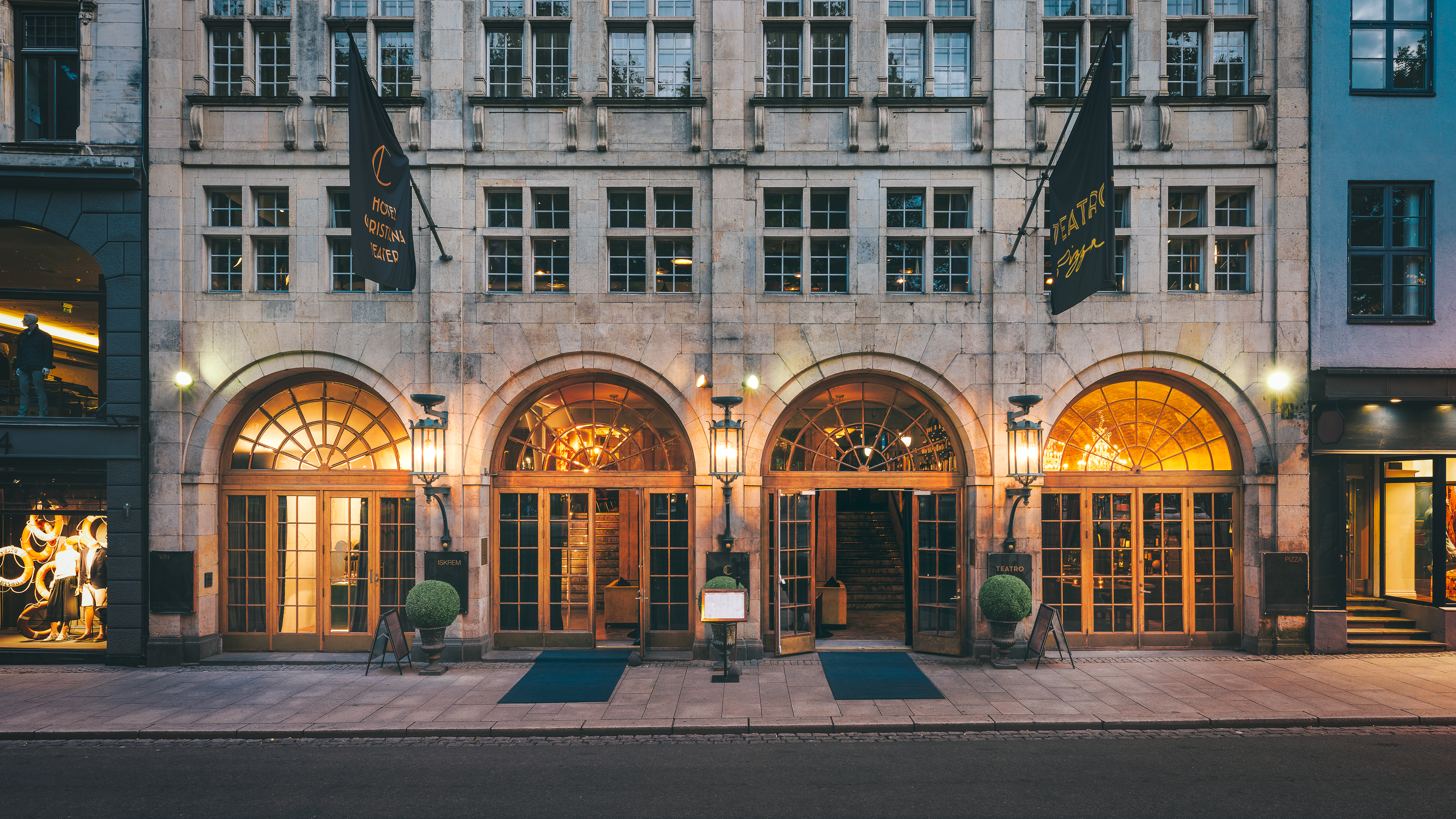
Photo of entrance of Hotel Christiania Teater

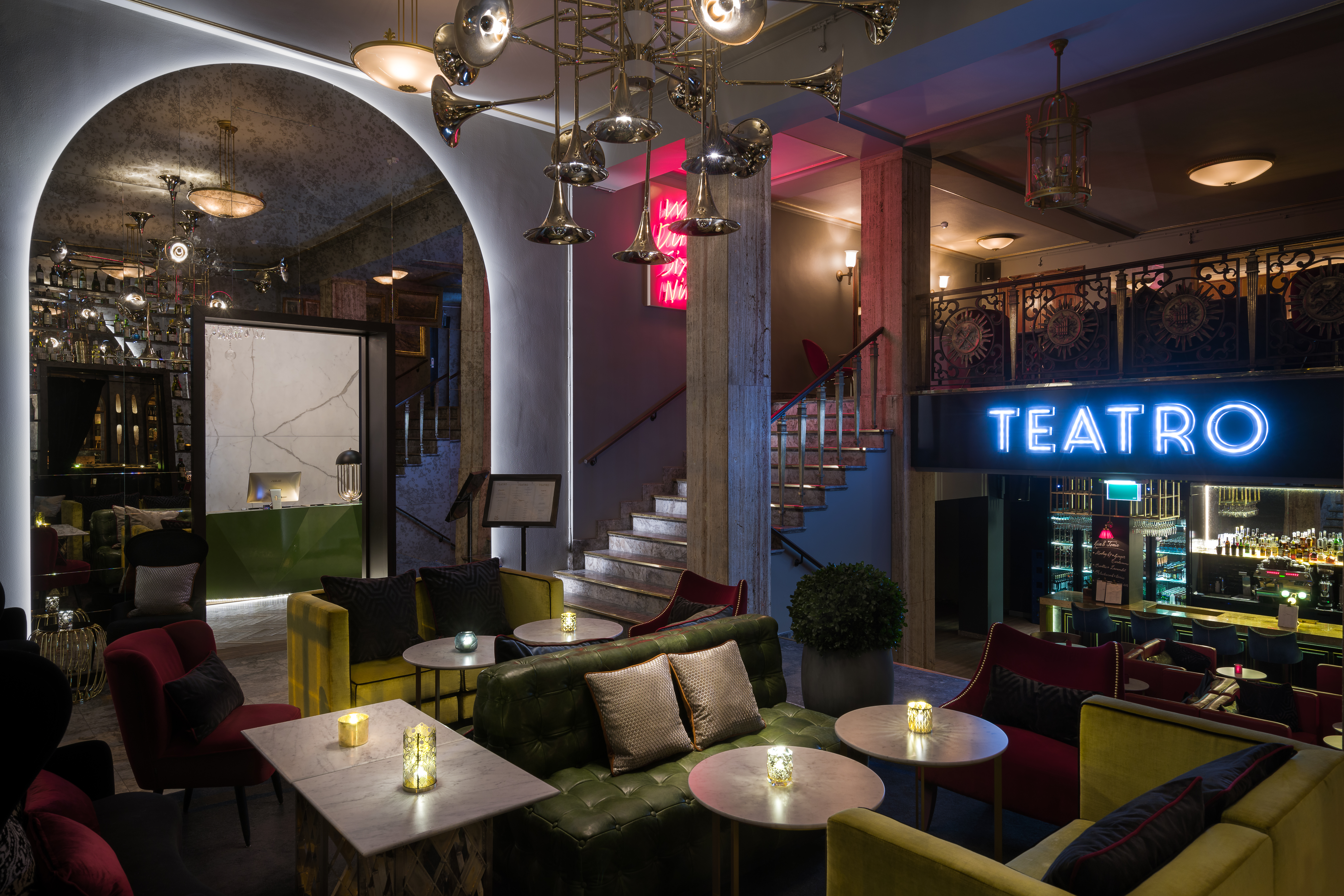
Interior of the lobby in Hotel Christiania Teater
