= Bernt Heiberg =

Norwegian architect (1909–2001)

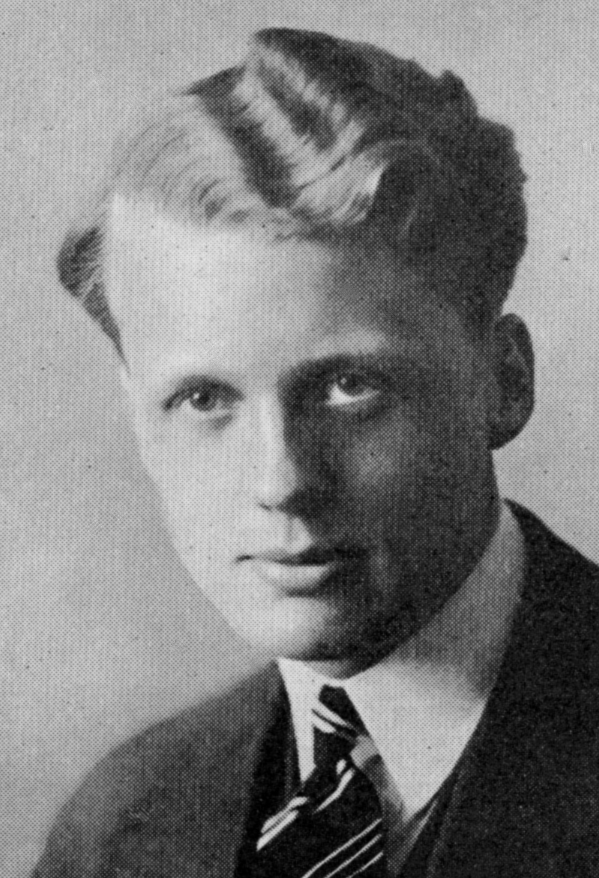
Bernt Heiberg, c. 1935

Johan Bernt Krohg Heiberg (4 September 1909 – 29 September 2001) was a Norwegian architect.

== Early and personal life ==
He was born in Kristiania (now Oslo), Norway. He was the son of barrister Axel Heiberg (1875–1952) and his wife Ragnhild Krohg (1879–1947). He had two brothers: Axel Heiberg jr. (1908–88) and Edvard Heiberg (1911–2000). In 1935, Heiberg married Halldis Rollang (1910–92).

== Career ==
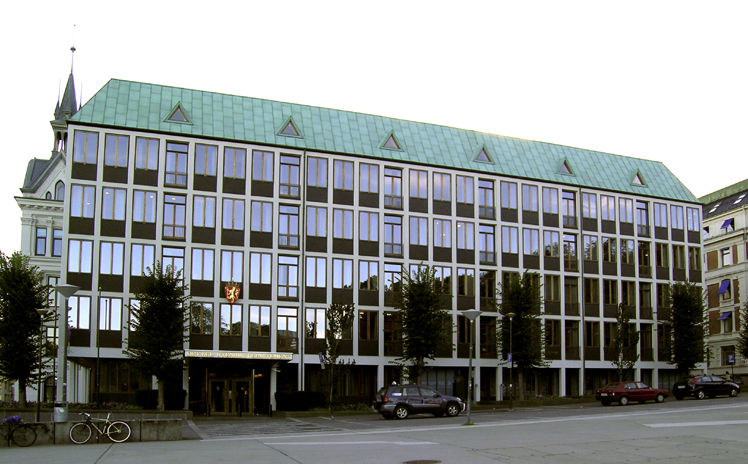
Norwegian Ministry of Foreign Affairs. architect: Bernt Heiberg (1962)

Heiberg took examen artium in 1927. He thereafter moved to Trondheim, where he studied at the Norwegian Institute of Technology. In 1936, he was hired as an assistant by Frithjof Stoud Platou. Four years later, he started his own architectural firm in Oslo. In the 1950s, Heiberg designed many buildings for the housing cooperative Oslo Bolig- og Sparelag and Christiania Bank. He designed also many buildings with Ola Mørk Sandvik until 1968, among them the head office of the Norwegian Ministry of Foreign Affairs in Oslo, the restaurant Annen Etage and the Hotel Continental.

Heiberg's buildings were mostly designed in functionalist style, which he considered "architecture for living people". When it came to politics, Heiberg was a leftist. However, despite his being a supporter of the communist league Mot Dag in the 1930s, Heiberg opposed the May 1968 revolts, stating that he "with shame had to admit, that [he] was tired of the whole thing".

From 1961 to 1971, Heiberg headed the Society for the Preservation of Ancient Norwegian Monuments. He also headed the board of the National Museum of Art, Architecture and Design from 1978 to 1981. In 1950, he was decorated as a Commander of the Royal Norwegian Order of St. Olav. He died on 29 September 2001.
