= Edvard Heiberg =

Norwegian director and engineer (1911–2000)

- Born: 11 June 1911; Oslo
- Died: 10 June 2000 (aged 88); Oslo
- Education: Norwegian Institute of Technology
- Occupation: Engineer
- Employer(s): Holmenkolbanen, Norwegian State Railways
- Organization: Norwegian Polytechnic Society
- Spouse: Karin Eldrid Heiberg (m. 1937; died 1992)
- Children: 2
- Relatives: Axel Heiberg Jr. (brother); Bernt Heiberg (brother)
- Awards: Commander of the Royal Norwegian Order of St. Olav, Order of the Dannebrog, Order of the Polar Star

Edvard Heiberg (11 June 1911, in Oslo – 10 June 2000, in Oslo) was a Norwegian director and engineer.

== Biography ==
Heiberg was the youngest son of barrister Axel Heiberg (1875–1952) and his wife Ragnhild Krohg (1879–1947). He had two brothers, Axel Heiberg Jr. (1908–1988) and Bernt Heiberg (1909–2001). In 1937, he married Karin Eldrid Heiberg (1915–92), with whom he had the sons Arvid Heiberg (1937–) and Henning Heiberg (8 September 1940).

He started studying in 1929, and graduated in 1934 from the Norwegian Institute of Technology in Trondheim. In 1935, he was employed by the construction company F. Selmer A/S. In the same year, he became assisting engineer in the Norwegian State Railways. From 1937 to 1938, he managed the construction of the Sørland Line, in particular the section from Kristiansand to Moi Station. During the 1940s, he had various positions in the state railways. From 1949 to 1953, he headed the operation department of the state railways.

In 1953, he was appointed managing director of Holmenkolbanen, where he remained until 1967. He was also chairman of the Norwegian Polytechnic Society from 1958 to 1959, and chairman of the Institute of Transport Economics between 1963 and 1970. After that, he returned to the Norwegian State Railways, where he was appointed director-general. During his leadership of the company, Heiberg became famous for the phrase "The railway is being strangled by impotent car users".

Heiberg was the last director-general of the state railways who lived in the large director-general house of the company at Filipstad in Oslo. In 1978, he retired from his position in the state railways. He was the last director-general of the state company who had voluntary resigned from the position.

In 1972, he was decorated as a Commander of the Royal Norwegian Order of St. Olav. He was also decorated with the Danish Order of the Dannebrog and the Swedish Order of the Polar Star. Heiberg died on 10 June 2000 in Oslo, the day before his 89th birthday.

Business positions
Preceded by Olav Braarud	Managing director of Holmenkolbanen; 1953–1967	Succeeded by Per Ulvik
Preceded by H. E. Stokke	Director-general of the Norwegian State Railways; 1967–1978	Succeeded by Robert Nordén
Non-profit organization positions
Preceded by Robert Major	Chairman of the Norwegian Polytechnic Society; 1958–1960	Succeeded by Alf Sanengen
