= Bøgh =

Bøgh or Bogh may refer to:

== People ==
- Albert Vilhelm Bøgh (1843–1927), Norwegian actor
- Buhe (politician) (1927–2017), Chinese politician also known as Bogh
- Carl Bøgh (1827–1893), Danish painter
- Christen Gran Bøgh (1876–1955), Norwegian jurist and critic
- Erik Bøgh (1822–1899), Danish playwright and songwriter
- Ernst Bøgh (1955–2024), Danish motorcycle speedway rider
- Johan Bøgh (1848–1933), Norwegian art historian
- Jon Knud Bøgh Fjeldså (born 1942), Norwegian-Danish ornithologist
- Kurt Bøgh (c. 1933–2011), Danish motorcycle speedway rider
- Rasmus Bøgh Wallin (born 1996), Danish cyclist
- Rosilicie Ochoa Bogh (born 1972), American politician
- Tore Bøgh (1924–2017), Norwegian diplomat
- Vilhelm Frimann Christie Bøgh (1817–1888), Norwegian archivist

== Places ==
- Boqeh, Iran (also known as Bogh'eh)
- Bowmore, Scotland (also known as Bogh Mòr)
