= Christen Gran Bøgh =

Norwegian jurist (1876–1955)

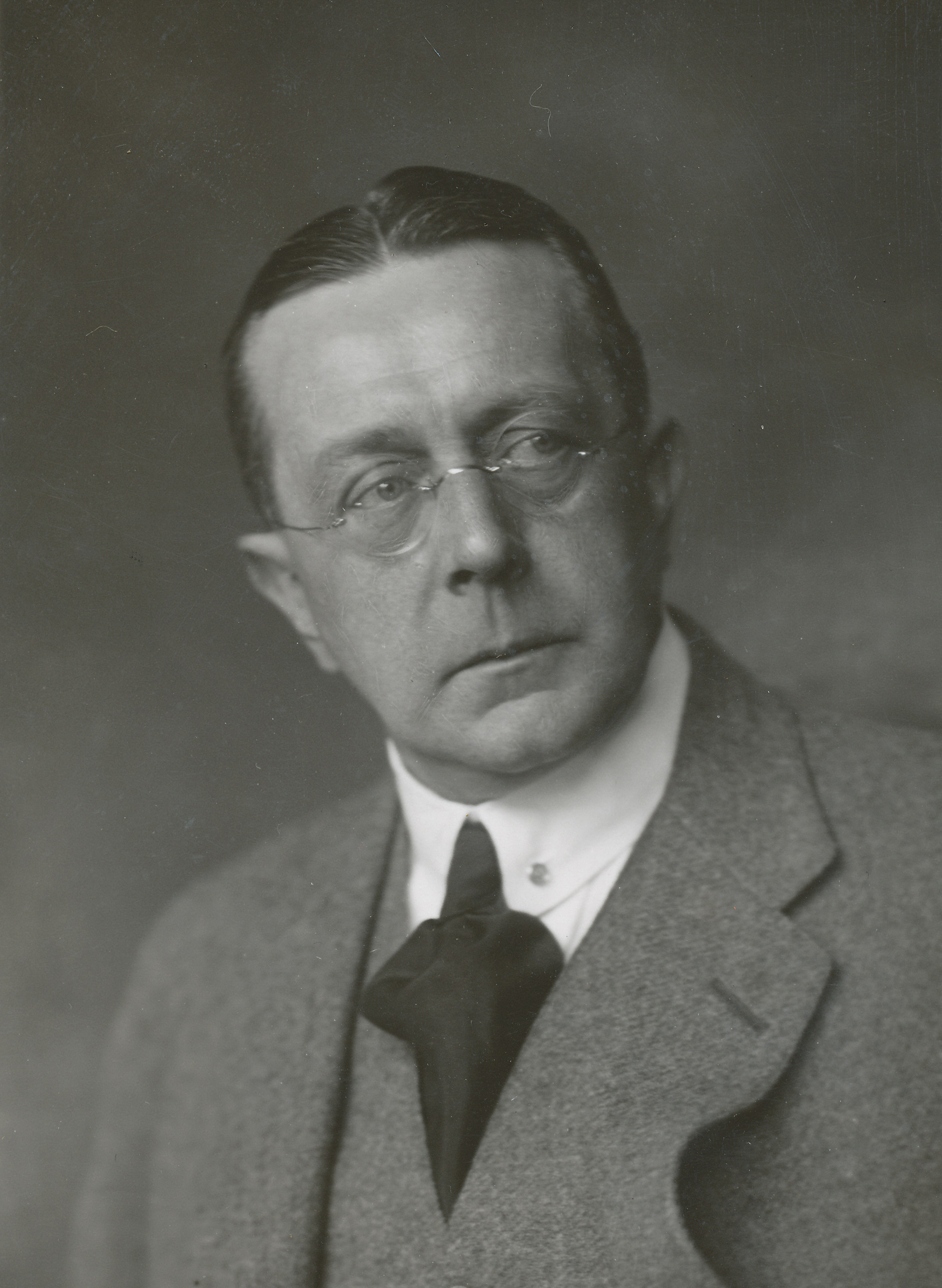
Christian Gran Bøgh, ca. 1930

Christen Gran Bøgh (11 June 1876 – 4 September 1955) was a Norwegian jurist, tourism promoter and theatre critic. He was based in the city of Bergen.

== Personal life ==
He was born in Bergen as the son of art historian Johan Bøgh (1848–1933) and his wife Wenche Gran (1852–1916). He was the brother of Albert Vilhelm Bøgh. On the paternal side he was a great-grandson of Lyder Sagen, and on the maternal side he was a great-grandson of politician Jens Gran, grandson of merchant Christen Knagenhjelm Gran and nephew of professor Gerhard Gran.

In 1906 he married Ragndid Sømme Gude (1880–1966), a daughter of jurist Ove Høegh Gude and Johanne Cathrine Kastrup Sømme. The latter was, like his uncle Gerhard's wife Maren, a daughter of Jacob Jørgen Kastrup Sømme and sister of painter Jacob Kielland Sømme.

== Career ==
Gran finished his secondary education in 1894, and then enrolled in studies. After five semesters of medicine, he started studying law, and graduated with the cand.jur. degree in 1902. He worked as a jurist between 1903 and 1928. In 1928 he organized the National Exhibition in his home city. He would concentrate on the promoting and marketing of tourism for the rest of his career. In 1953 he administered the inaugural Bergen International Festival.

Bøgh was also a prolific theatre critic in a number of newspapers, as well as a subeditor in Bergens Tidende for some years. He had published the historical book Teater i Bergen gjennem 100 år. Spedte bidrag til norsk teaterhistorie already in 1915. According to the encyclopedia Norsk biografisk leksikon, his cultural work "left deep traces in the local community". He held several board memberships in public and private bodies, and also served as a deputy member of Bergen city council.

He was a Knight of the Danish Order of the Dannebrog, the Swedish Order of Vasa and the Finnish Order of the White Rose. He died in 1955 in Bergen.
