= Theodor Philipsen =

Danish artist (1840–1920)

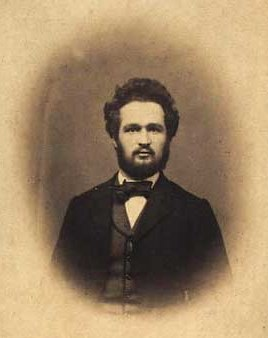
Theodor Philipsen (before 1880)

Theodor Esbern Philipsen (10 June 1840 – 3 March 1920) was a Danish painter of Jewish ancestry, known for landscapes and animal portraits. He also did small figures in wax and clay.

== Biography ==
Theodor Philipsen was born at Copenhagen to a cultured merchant family and learned to draw at an early age. At first, however, he was primarily interested in animals, so he went to study agriculture at his uncle's estate near Slangerup. In the 1860s, one of his brothers introduced him to the painter, Hans Smidth, which made him decide to become an artist. He began his studies at the Royal Danish Academy of Fine Arts with Carl Bøgh and later came under the influence of Frederik Vermehren.

He was also familiar with the animal portraits of Johan Thomas Lundbye and the 17th-century painter Paulus Potter. In 1873, he was awarded the Neuhausenske Prize for his painting of horses swimming. In the 1880s, he began painting en plein air and began to show some elements of Impressionism.

At the age of thirty-five, concerned that his images were not realistic enough, he went to Paris to study with Léon Bonnat. There, he practiced intensive croquis drawing; to capture the basics of position and movement. He also obtained knowledge of the radical trends in French art through his friend, Rémy Cogghe, with whom he spent some time in Spain and Italy. This all came together in a distinctive style. His favorite places for painting were Saltholm and Amager.

In the winter of 1884–1885, Paul Gauguin made a visit to Copenhagen. Philipsen approached him for some advice and was shown how to use small brushes with quick, firm strokes. They remained friends for life.

In 1890, he received the Eckersberg Medal. Around 1905, he began to suffer from an eye disease that interfered with his ability to paint. In 1915, he was awarded the Thorvaldsen Medal. He is generally credited with establishing Impressionism as an important aspect of Danish painting. He died in Copenhagen and was buried at Holmen Cemetery.

== Selected paintings ==
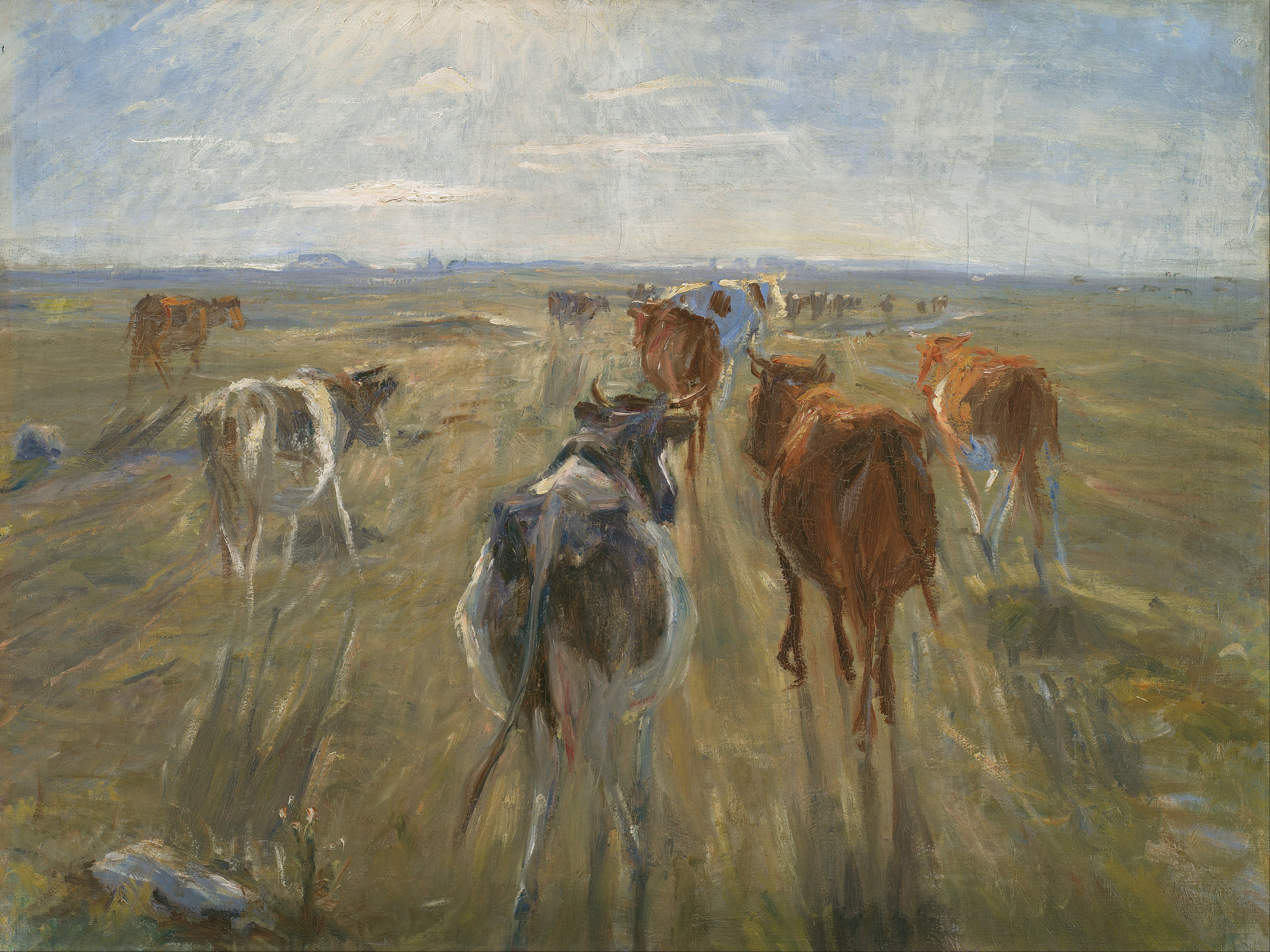
Long Shadows
Cattle on the Island of Saltholm

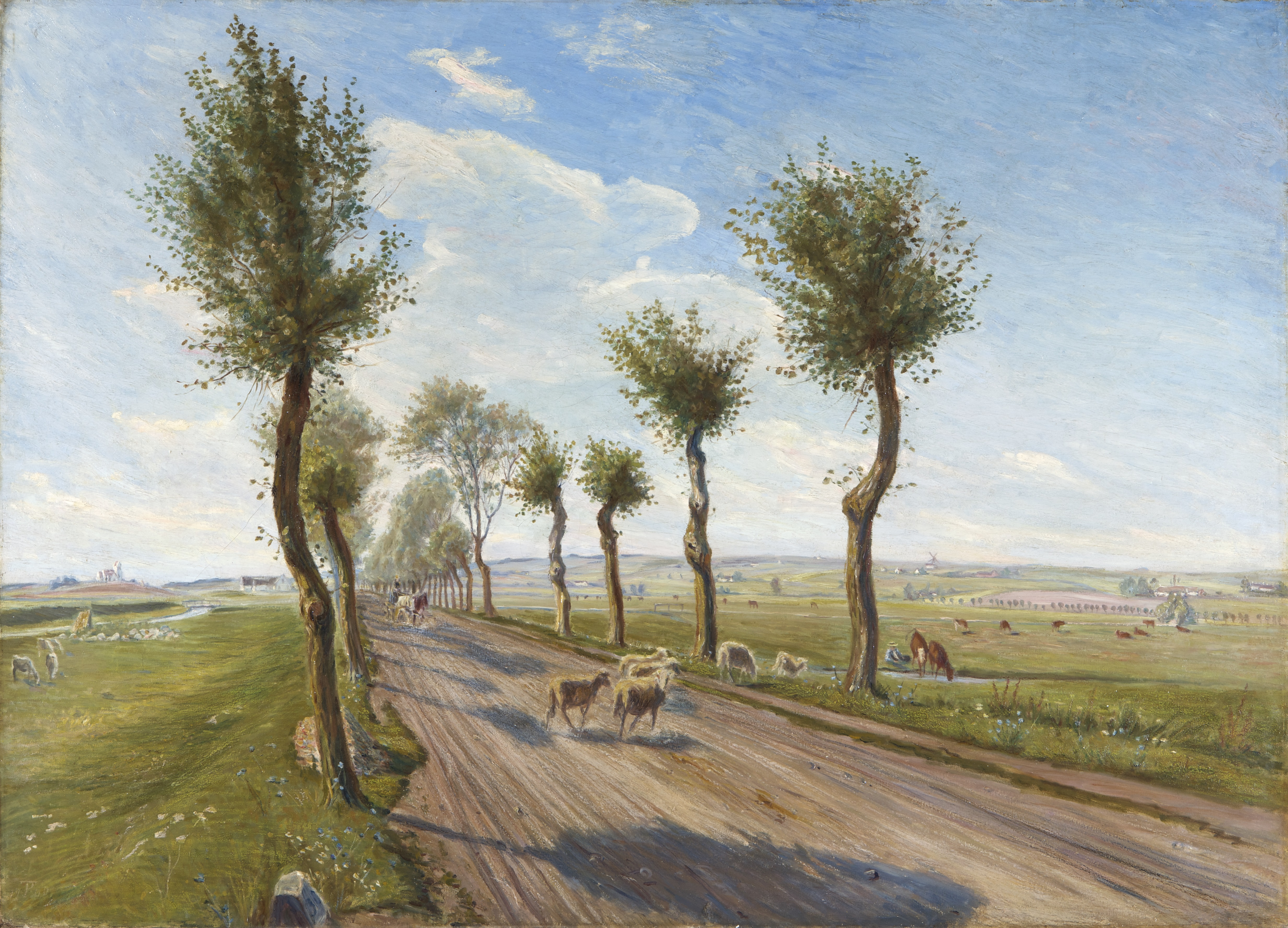
Road at Fårevejle

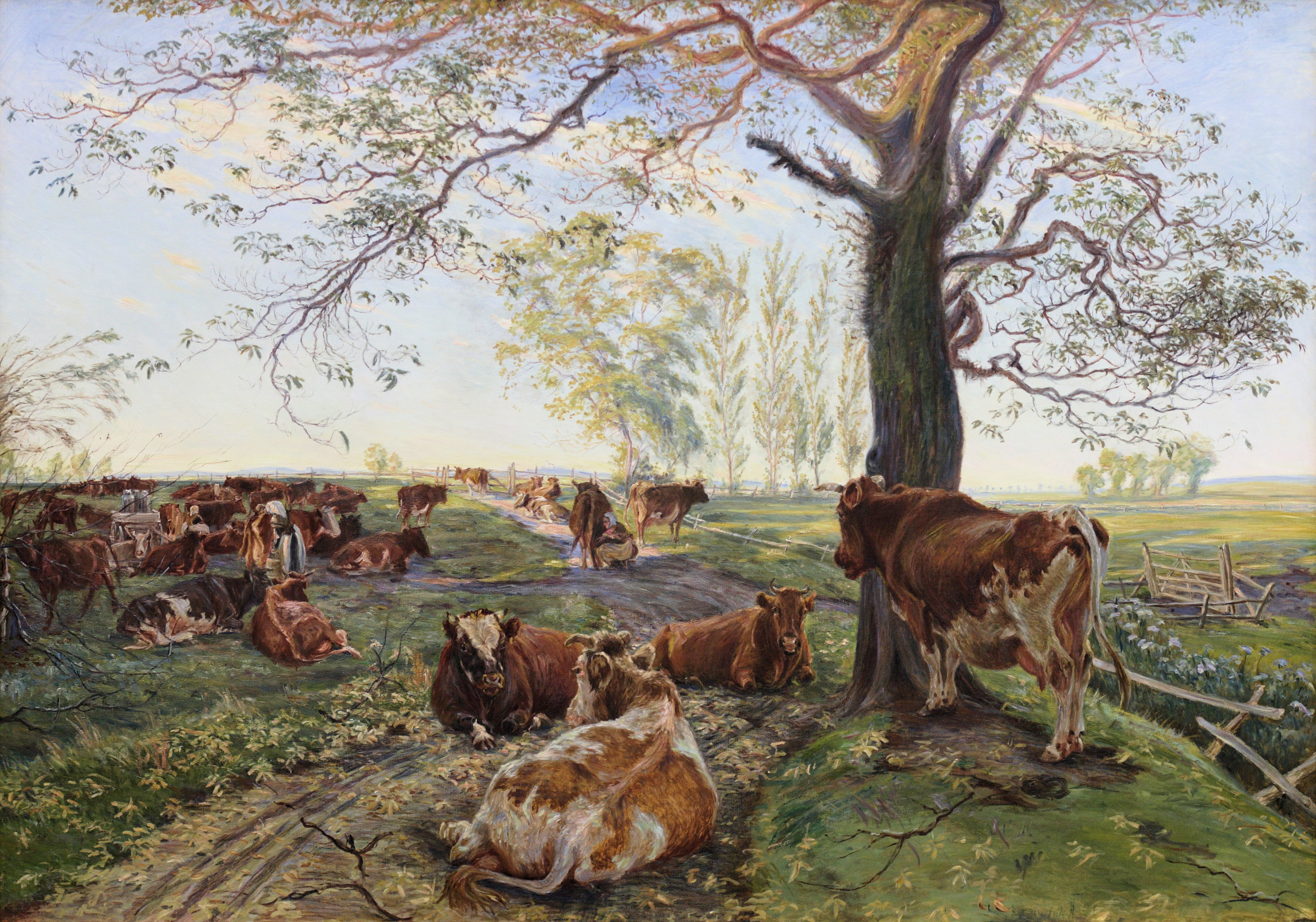
Milking at Dyrehavegård,
near Kolding
