= Catherine Engelhart Amyot =

Danish painter

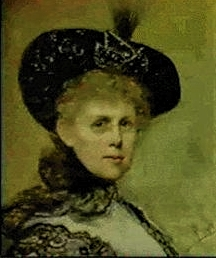
- Catherine Engelhart Amyot: Self-Portrait
- Born: 6 February 1845; Copenhagen, Denmark
- Died: 1926 (aged 80–81); Sèvres, France
- Style: portraiture and genre works

Catherine (Cathinca) Caroline Engelhart Amyot (1845–1926) was a Danish painter who specialized in portraits and genre works. She travelled widely, creating a number of works of historical interest. In 1869 she began exhibiting in Düsseldorf and Copenhagen. After marrying the English physician, Thomas Amyot, from 1879 to 1890 she exhibited frequently in the Paris Salon and in London's Royal Academy of Arts.

== Early life and education ==
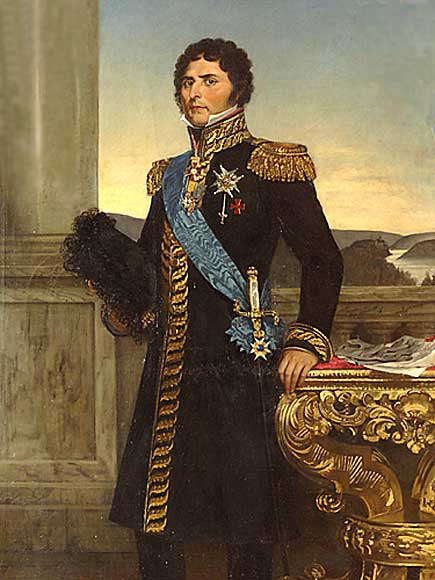
Catherine Engelhart: King Carl Johan as king of Norway (1875)

Born in Copenhagen on 6 February 1845, Catherine Caroline Engelhart was the adopted daughter of the National Bank official Christian Engelhart and his wife Nathalie née Rønne. She was raised in Copenhagen where she was taught to draw and paint by the Danish painter Carl Bøgh but, wishing to keep abreast of the latest developments in art, she travelled abroad from 1867. After first moving to Brussels, she settled in Düsseldorf for seven years, studying under the Swiss artist Benjamin Vautier and the German Karl Ferdinand Sohn.

== Painting career ==
From 1869, Engelhart exhibited in Copenhagen's Kunsthal Charlottenborg as well as in Düsseldorf. The most successful painting she exhibited in Copenhagen was Ingen roser uden torne (No Roses without Thorns, 1874) which was purchased by the Danish Art Society Kunstforeningen.

She travelled to Christiania (now Oslo) in 1875 and then to Stockholm where she painted two posthumous portraits of King Carl Johan as king of Norway. They had been commissioned by King Oscar II. One of them now hangs in the Bernadotte Parlour in the Royal Palace in Oslo.

After returning to Denmark for a short stay in Copenhagen, she embarked on another study trip, this time to Paris. Here she studied from 1876 under William-Adolphe Bouguereau who considered her to be one of his best students. While in Paris, she met the English medical doctor Thomas Howse Edward Amyot whom she married on 16 May 1878. Thereafter, the couple moved to England where they settled first in Norfolk and from 1882 in London. Many of her later paintings were genre works, often depicting her daughter Catherine Florence as a model.

== Family and later life ==
Catherine and Thomas Howes Edward Amyot had three children, all born in Diss, Norfolk: Thomas Engelhart (born 1879), Catherine Florence (born 1880) and Noel Ethel (born 1882). There are records of the Amyots living in Kensington (1891) and in Margate (1901). Thomas Amyot died in late 1903.

Little is known about Catherine Amyot's later life but she died in Sèvres, southwest of Paris, in 1926.

== Paintings ==
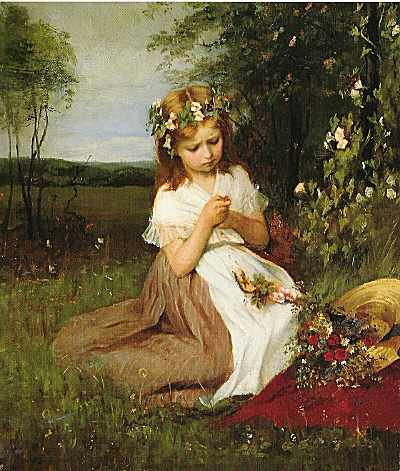
Ingen roser uden torne (1874)

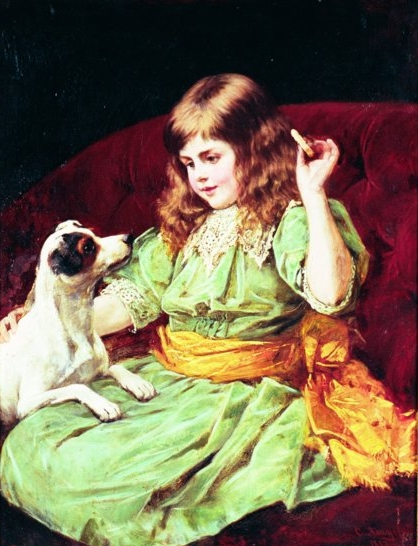
A Treat for the Puppy (1887)

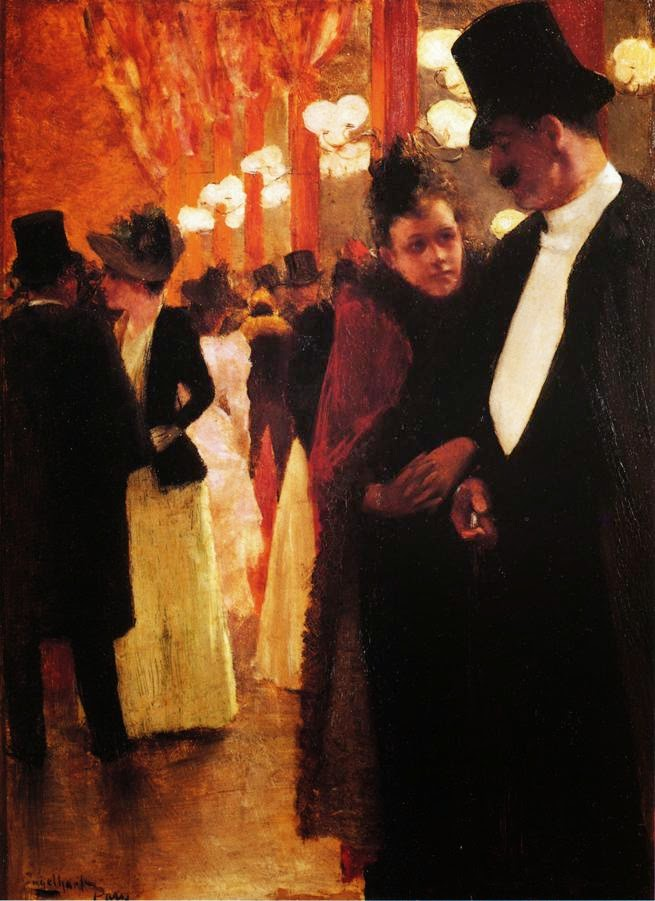
La soirée parisienne (1904)

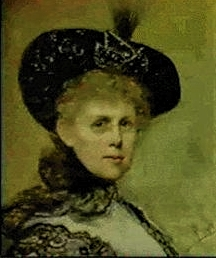
A Self Portrait

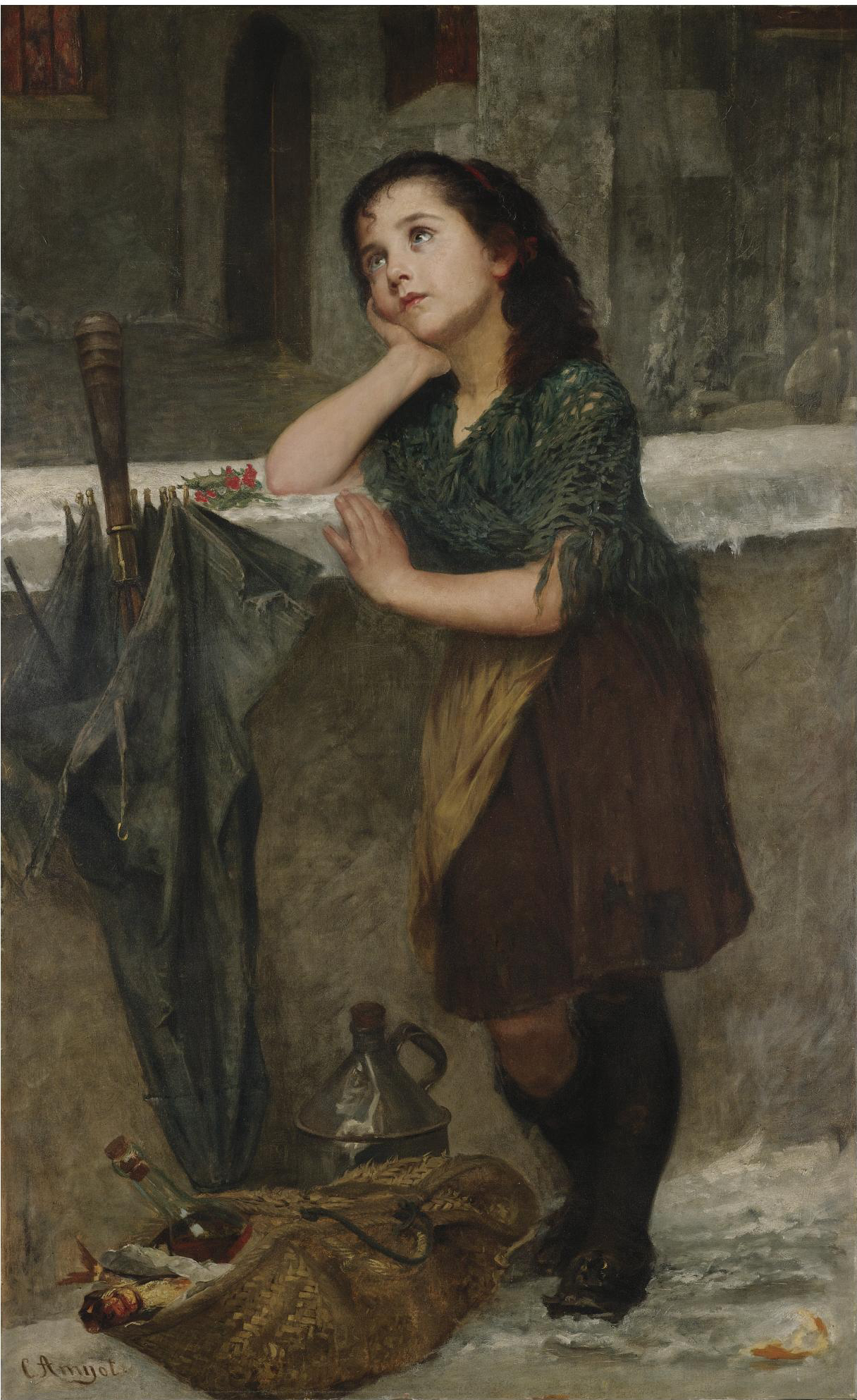
Daydreams

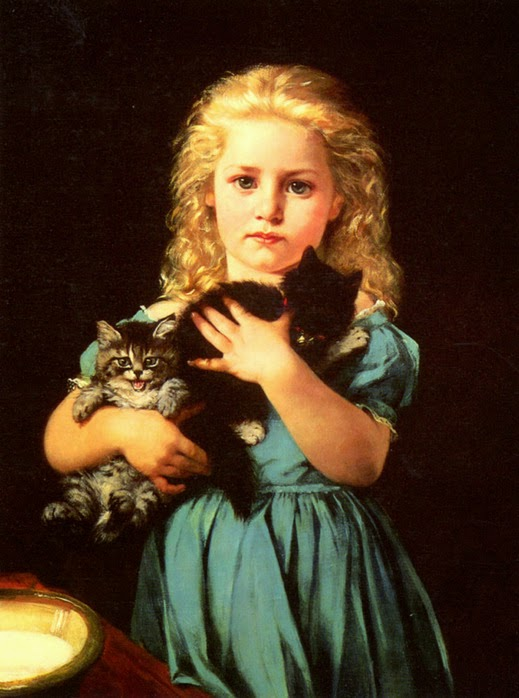
An Armful of Mischief
