= Saltholm =

Danish island in the Øresund

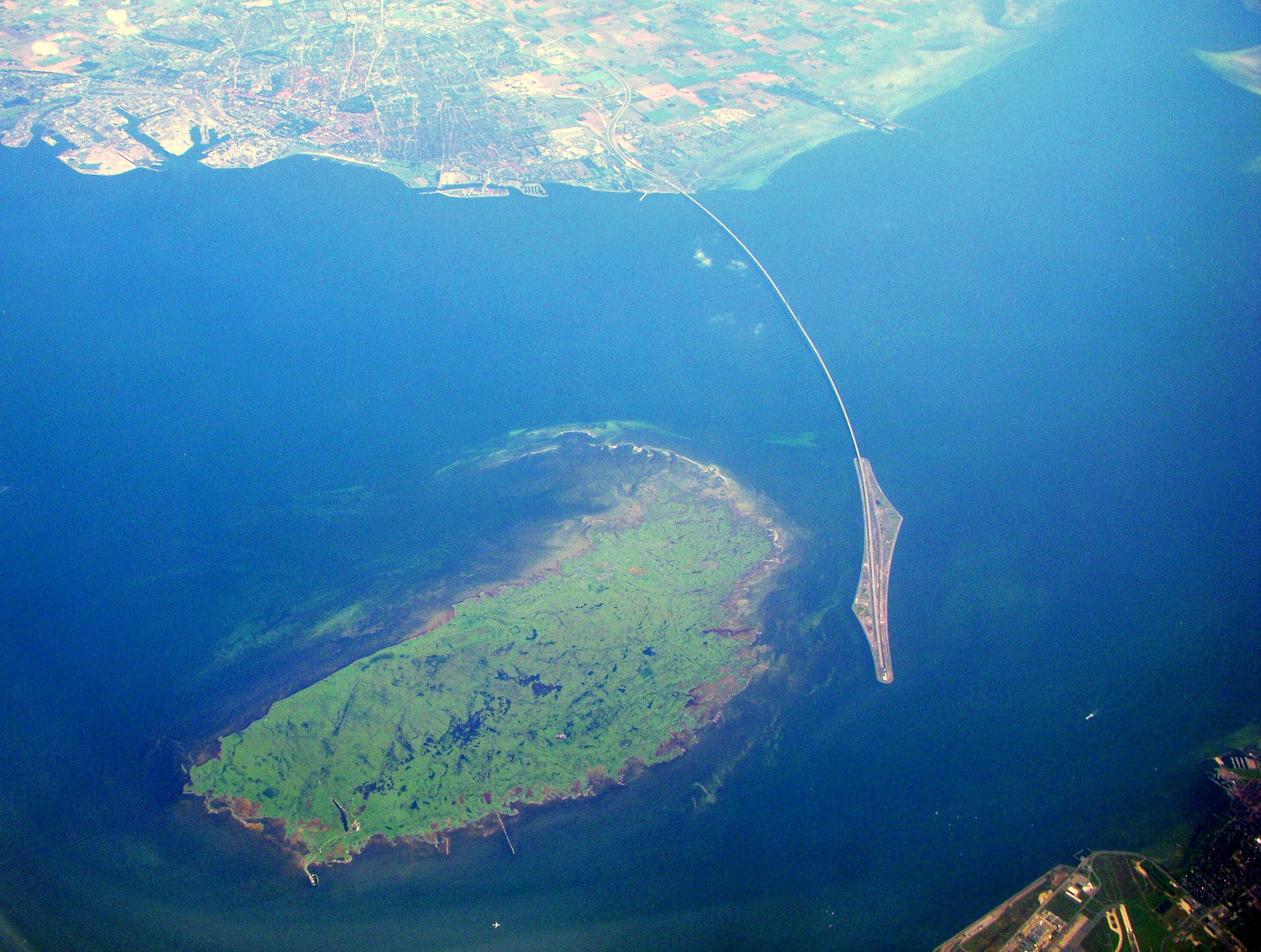
- Saltholm (left) and Peberholm (right) in 2011

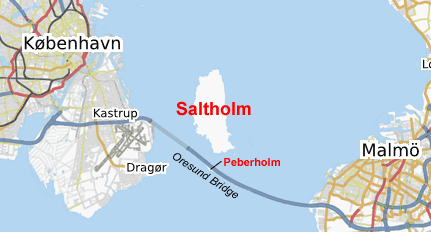
- Location of Saltholm in the Øresund

Geography
- Location: Øresund, Baltic Sea
- Coordinates: 55°38′N 12°46′E
- Area: 16 km^{2} (6.2 sq mi)
- Length: 7 km (4.3 mi)
- Width: 3 km (1.9 mi)
- Highest elevation: 2 m (6 ft)
- Highest point: Harehøj

Administration
- Denmark
- Region: Hovedstaden
- Municipality: Tårnby
- Largest settlement: Holmegård (pop. 2)

Demographics
- Population: 2 (2021)
- Pop. density: 0.12/km^{2} (0.31/sq mi)
- Ethnic groups: Danish

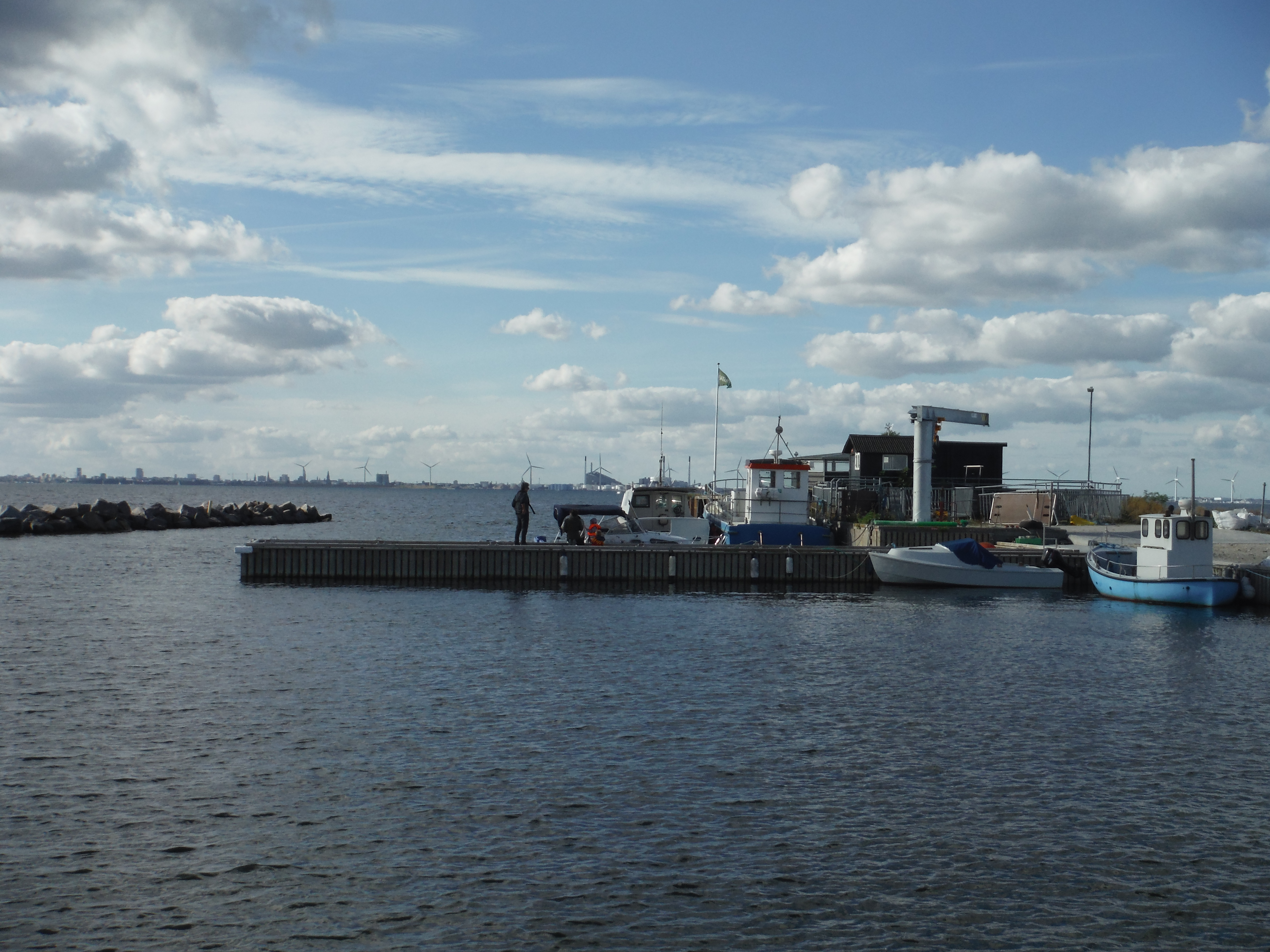
Barakkebroen harbor

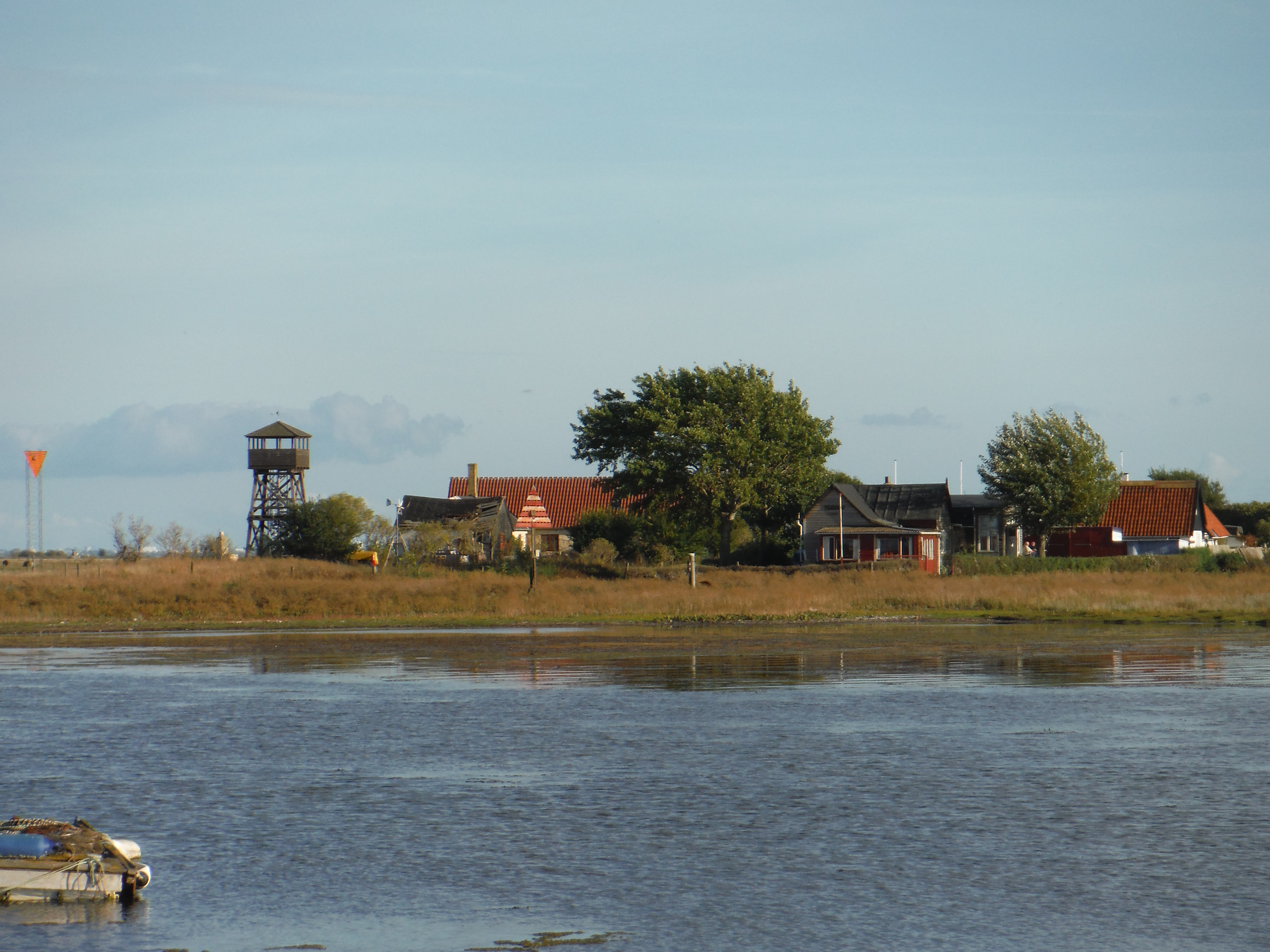
Saltholm Barakkeby

Saltholm (Danish pronunciation: [sæltˈhʌlˀm]; lit. 'Salt Islet'; Swedish: Saltholm(en)) is a Danish island in the Øresund, the strait that separates Denmark and Sweden. It is located to the east of the Danish island of Amager in Tårnby municipality and lies just to the west of the sea border between Denmark and Sweden. The island is 7 km long and 3 km across at its widest point. With an area of 16 km^{2}, it is Denmark's 21st largest island. Saltholm is very flat; its highest point stands only 2 m (6 ft) above sea level, rendering it vulnerable to flooding if persistent east winds cause a tidal surge in the Baltic Sea. It is a relatively new landmass in geological terms, having risen from the sea about 4,000 years ago due to post-glacial rebound, and is surrounded by a large area of shallow water (of 2 m depth or less) that covers an area of 28 km^{2} (11 sq mi). A series of islets, inlets and rock deposits from the last ice age appear at the south end of the island.

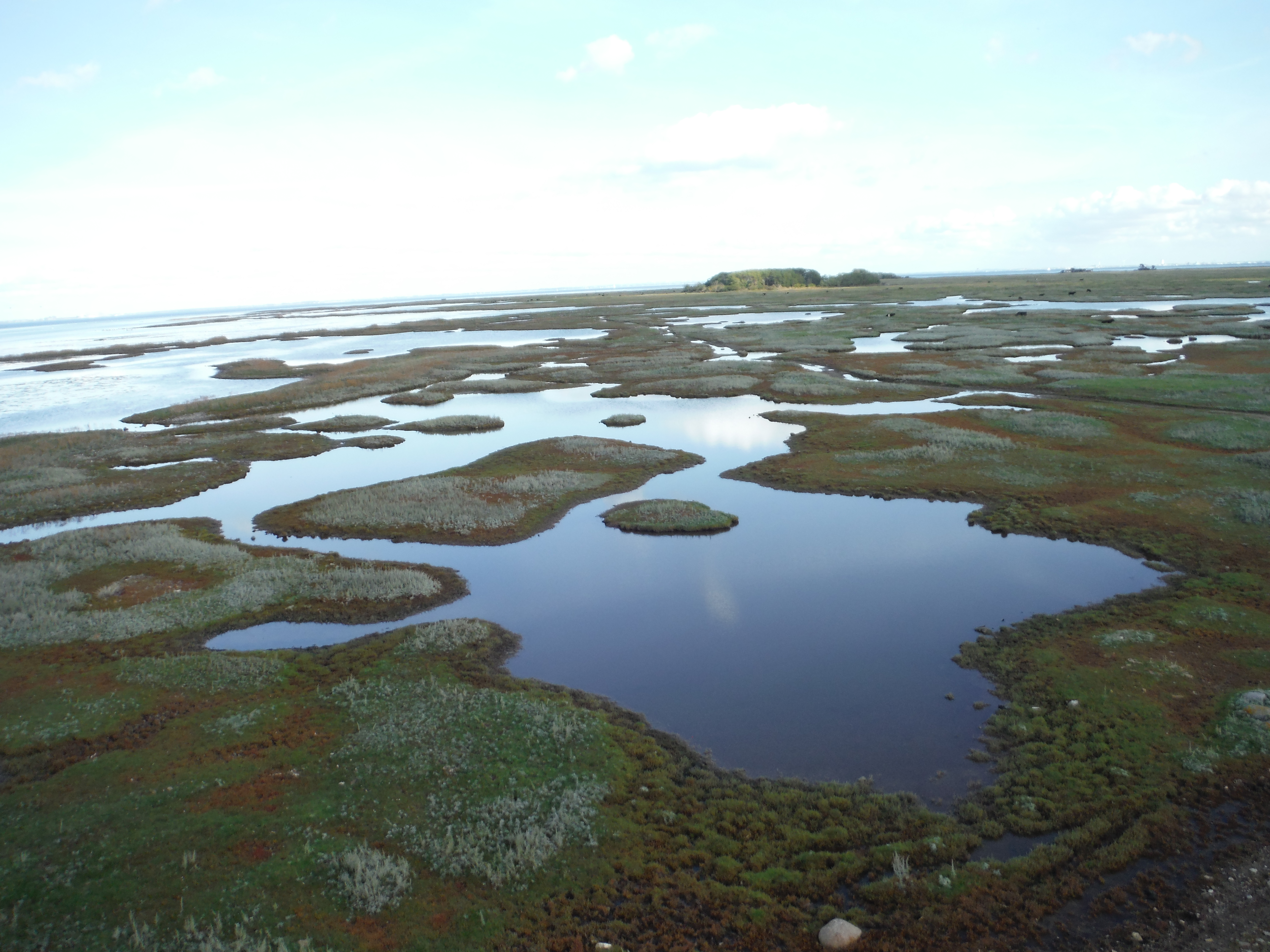
Saltholm Ponds

Its neighboring island to the south is the artificial island Peberholm (Pepper Islet), which is a part of the Øresund Bridge and was named to complement Saltholm. Sometimes, Saltholm and its neighboring island to the north, Ven, are referred to as the Øresund Islands.

== Flora and fauna ==
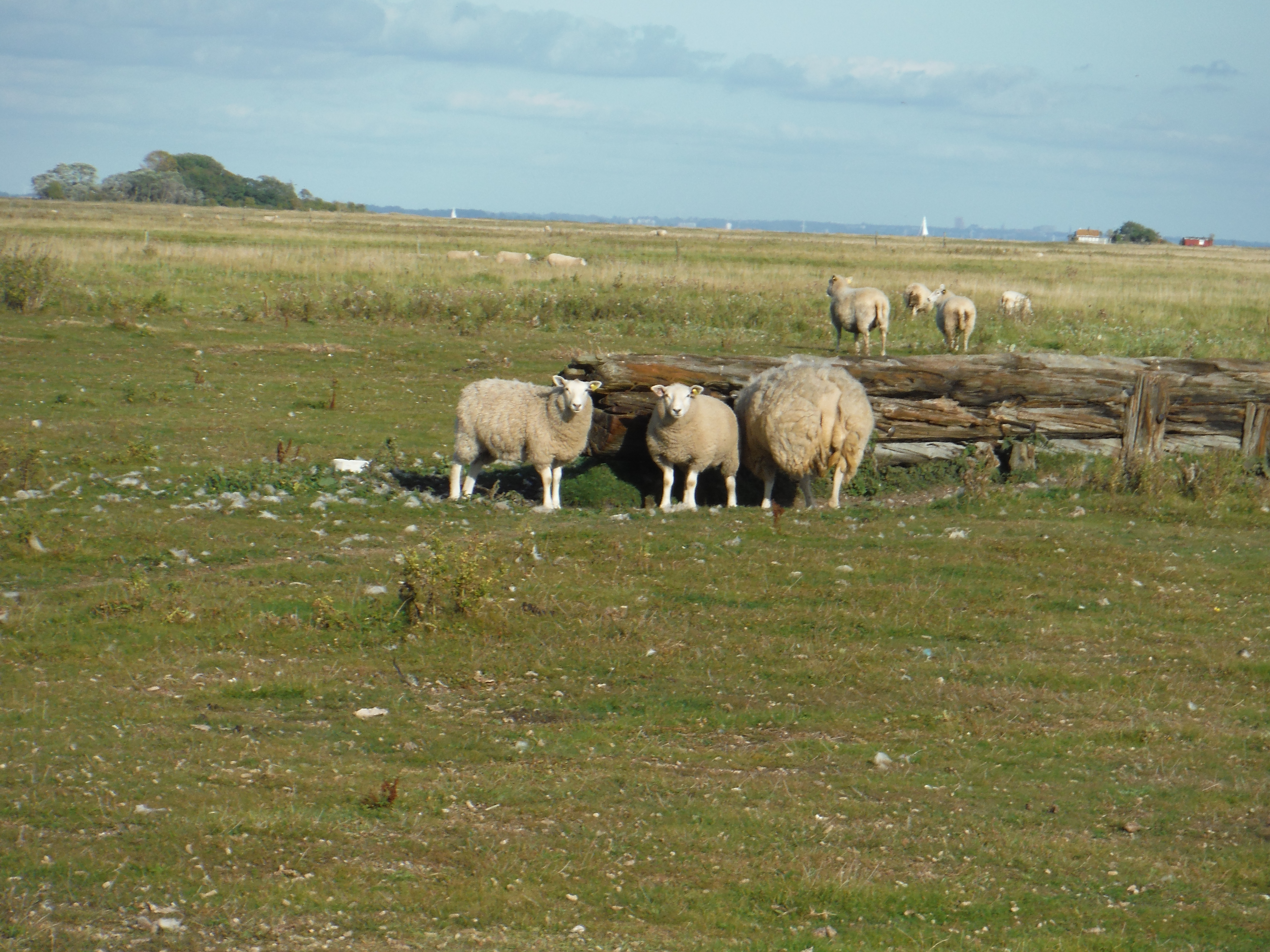
Saltholm Sheep

Saltholm's vegetation is dominated primarily by grasses, with its landscape consisting mainly of flat chalk meadowlands and coastal meadow. There are few trees on Saltholm, clustered mainly in two places in the north and south-west of the island. The island has a rich variety of flora, notably motherwort (Leonurus cardiaca), henbane (Hyoscyamus niger), blue iris (Iris spuria) and chickweed.

Saltholm is a protected nature reserve for wild birds which nest in large numbers on the island. The southern part of the island, an extensive salt marsh, is protected under the Ramsar Convention. The island as a whole, along with the surrounding area of sea, has been designated a nature reserve by the European Union, as well as an Important Bird Area (IBA) by BirdLife International. Mussel beds, eel grass, snails, crustaceans and fish in the shallow waters around the island provide an important food source for water birds. Because of its importance as a wildlife sanctuary, access to Saltholm and its surrounding waters is strictly controlled. Access to the island is via a small harbour at Barakkebro, at the north end of Saltholm.

The island is Denmark's largest grazing area for geese, some 7,000 of which visit during the summer. Around 3,500 juvenile swans also live on the island in the summer, with some 2,000 wintering there. 10,000–12,000 ducks breed and graze on Saltholm during autumn and late winter/spring. Saltholm is also home to Europe's largest breeding colony of eiders; 15,000 live on the island during the spring and some 7,000–8,000 are hatched on the island each year.

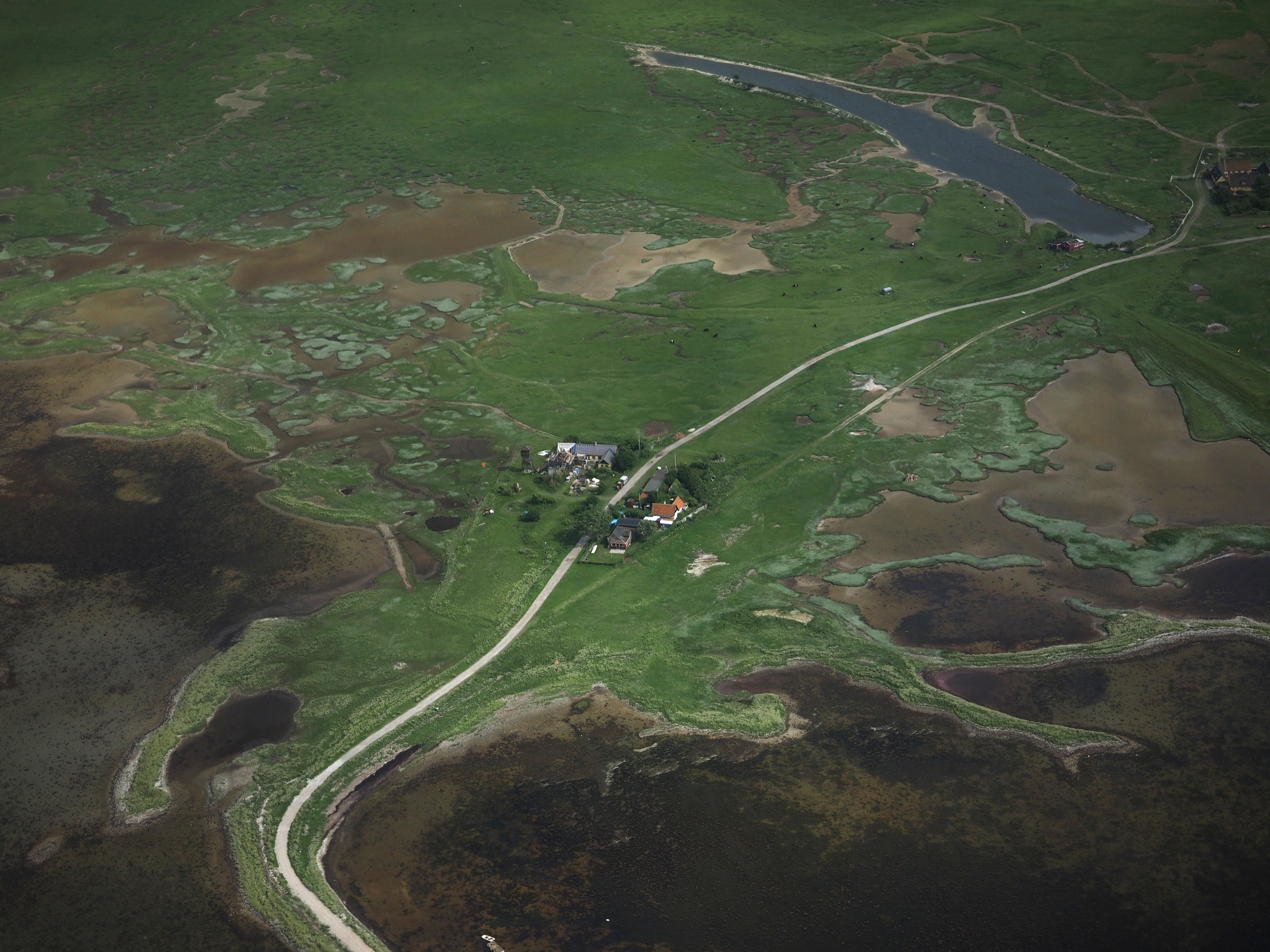

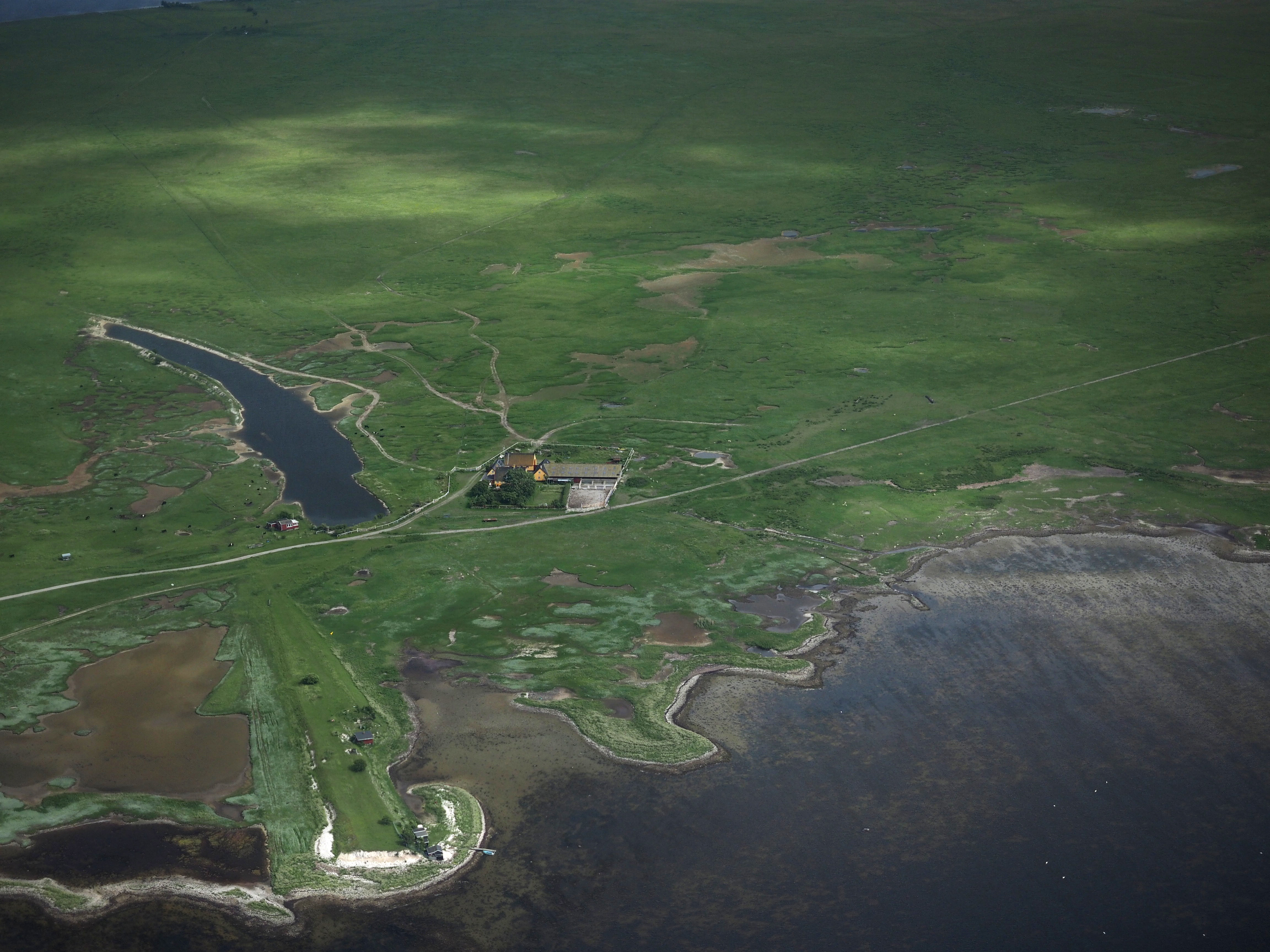

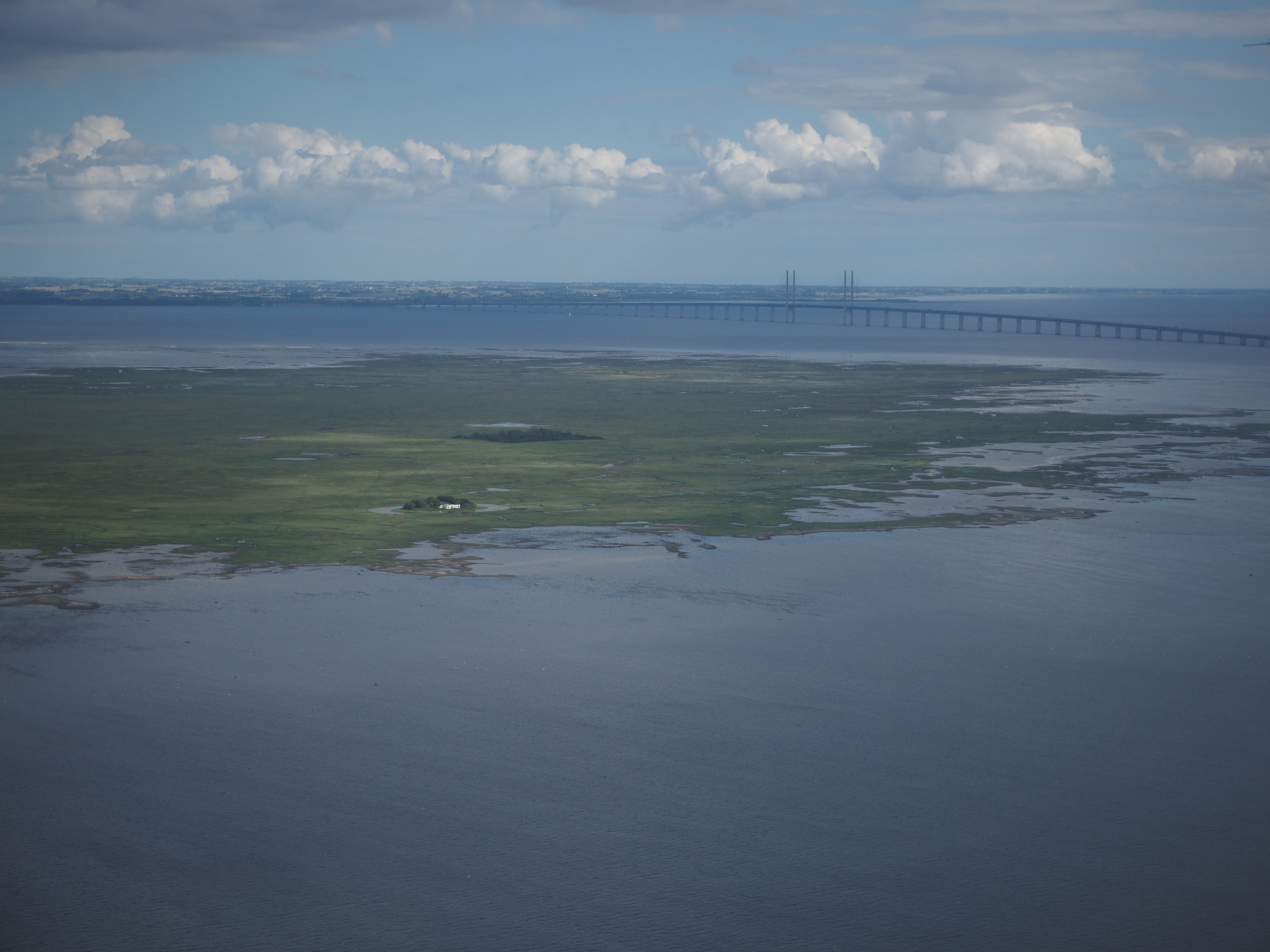

== History ==
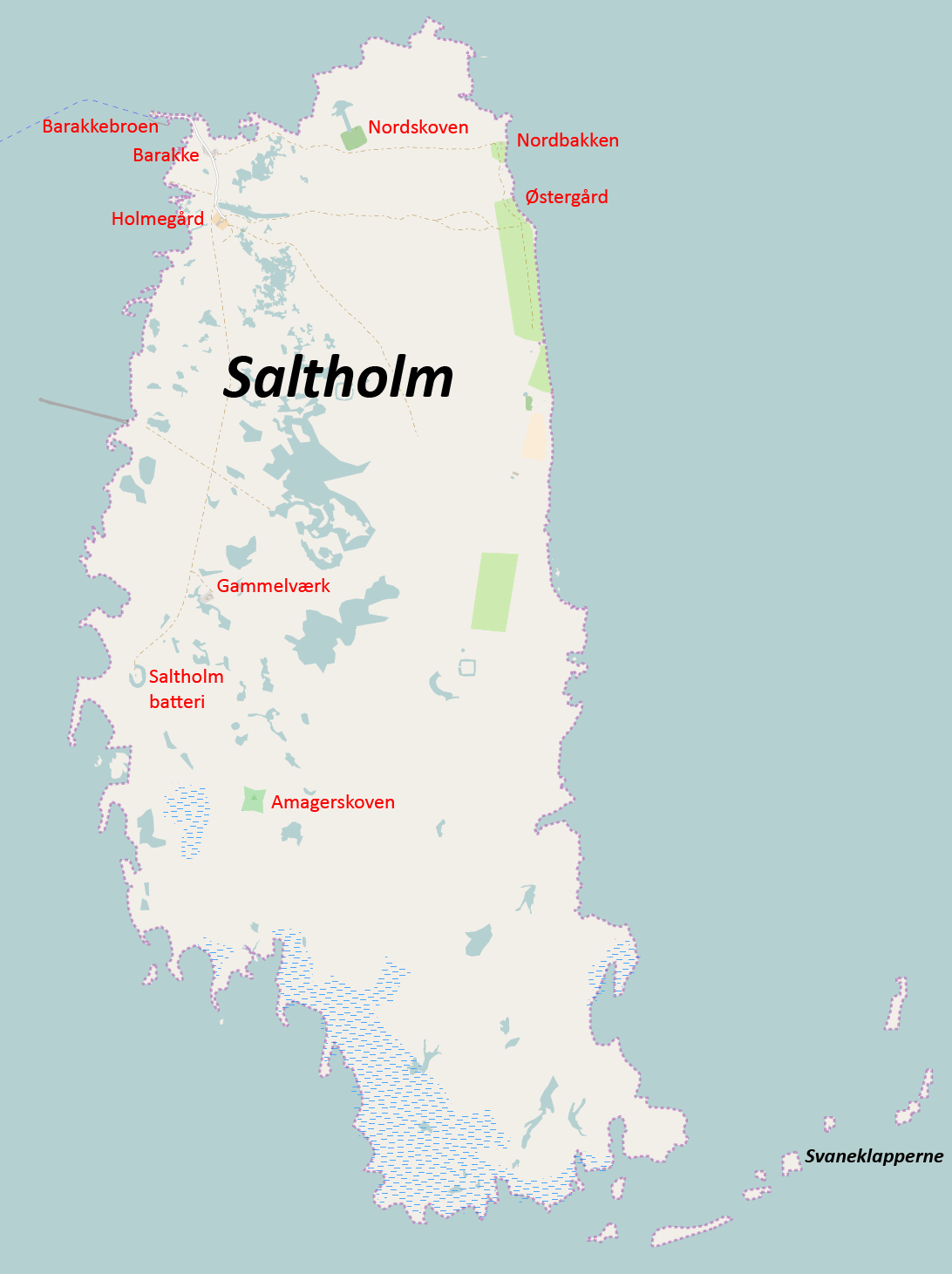
Map of Saltholm

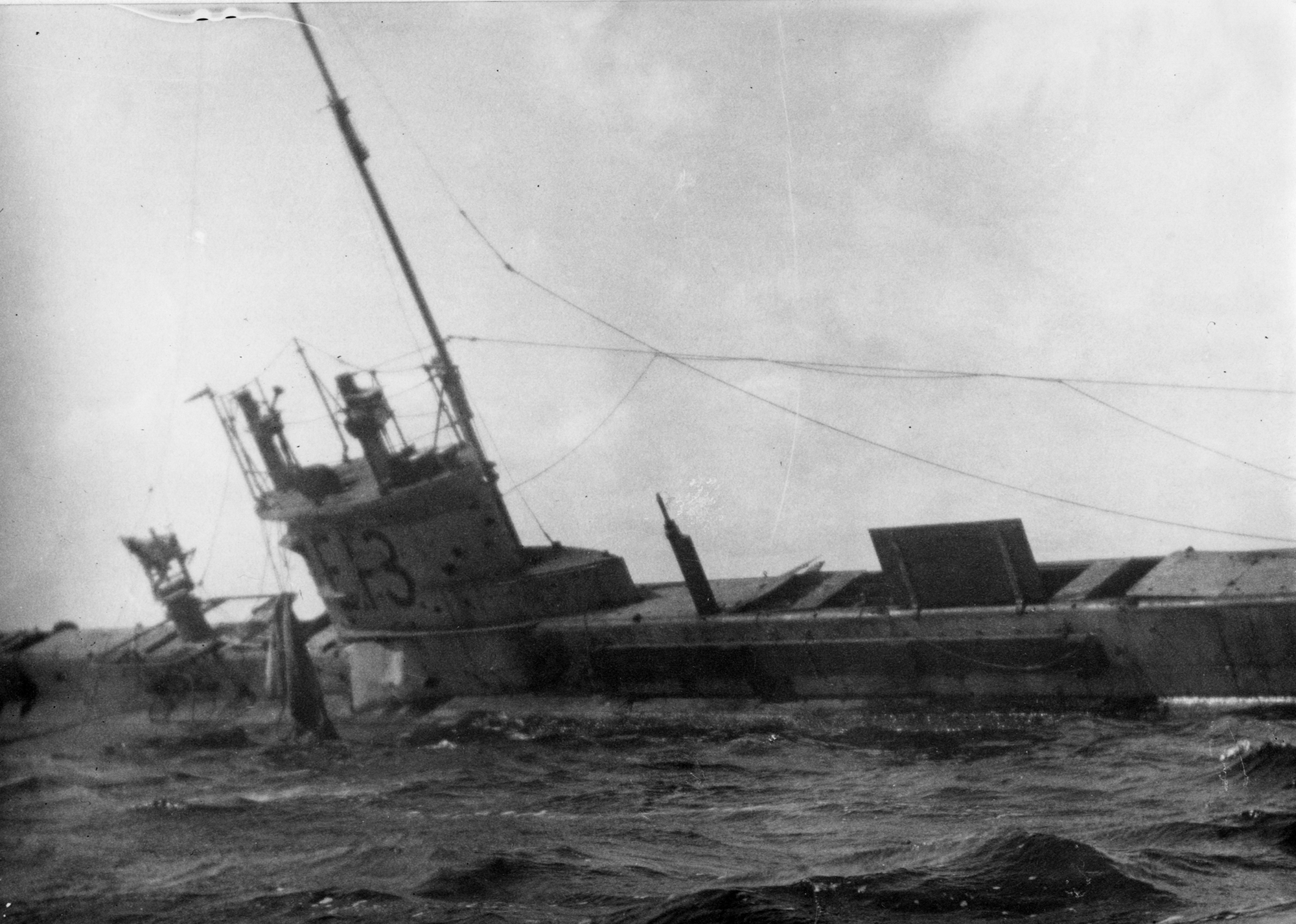
The British submarine HMS E13 aground on the shore of Saltholm in August 1915, shortly before being destroyed by German naval forces

Humans have lived in small numbers on Saltholm since the Middle Ages and probably before. The population has decreased from a peak of 298 people in 1916, when the island was fortified during World War I, to two people as of January 2021.

The existence of the island is first attested in 1230, when King Valdemar II of Denmark is recorded as having given Saltholm to Bishop Niels Stigsen of the see of Roskilde. For centuries, the island was used to quarry limestone, which was used in nearby Copenhagen and elsewhere; in 1289, the town lord of Copenhagen is recorded to have granted quarrying rights on Saltholm and quarrying continued until as late as 1935. The island was also traditionally used as pasture land for the cattle of the people of the nearby Danish island of Amager. The cows of Saltholm were commemorated in the late 19th century by the Danish painter Theodor Philipsen, who travelled frequently to the island to paint its cattle and treeless landscapes.

Saltholm was used as a quarantine station between 1709 and 1711 when Copenhagen suffered plague and cholera outbreaks. Travellers wishing to land in the city were required to stay in quarantine on the island for 40 days. In 1873, a private company, the Saltholmlaug, acquired the island from the state and still owns it today.

The island's position in the middle of the Øresund gave it some military significance during the two World Wars. In 1912, the Danish government constructed Flakfortet (the sand-shoal fort) on the Salthom Flak sands just north of the island proper, stationing a number of artillery pieces ranging in calibre from 47 mm to 290 mm. Most of the guns were mounted on barbette carriages and protected by armoured shields and concrete and earthen ramparts. The fort was still active at the start of World War II; although old, its guns were still seen as a strong deterrent.

Saltholm was the site of an incident resulting in the loss of the British submarine HMS E13, which ran aground on the island on 17 August 1915 due to a faulty compass. Two days later, two German destroyers attacked the submarine while it was still stranded on the shoreline as the crew worked to refloat the vessel. Fifteen of the submariners were killed before Danish torpedo boats intervened to deter the attackers. The violation of the country's neutrality outraged the Danish government, prompting a diplomatic protest to the Germans, and the casualties were given high-profile official funerals by the Danish navy. The surviving crew were interned in Denmark until the end of the war in November 1918, and the wrecked submarine was scrapped. The commander of the E13, Lt Cdr Geoffrey Layton, went on to have a distinguished career in the Royal Navy and commanded the British Eastern Fleet during the Second World War.

The island was for many years considered as a possible location for a new international airport and fixed link between Denmark and Sweden. The nearby Copenhagen Airport at Kastrup has long been the busiest airport in Scandinavia but has suffered from an acute shortage of space and its proximity to built-up areas. In 1965, the Nordic Council agreed in principle to build a new international airport on Saltholm, to replace the airport at Kastrup, and to construct a bridge-and-tunnel link across the island to connect Copenhagen and Malmö. The proposal was strongly supported by Scandinavian Airlines System, the main user of Copenhagen Airport. The plan envisaged building two pairs of runways, which would carry up to 20 million passengers a year by 1990. A 9 km (5.6 mi) bridge would connect it to Malmö and a 5 km (3.1 mi) tunnel would link to Kastrup on the Danish side. The project was estimated to cost the equivalent of £250 million in 1967 (£3.1 billion / €3.4 billion at 2009 prices).

The plan was approved by the Danish parliament in 1969 with completion scheduled for 1985. However, it was repeatedly delayed; contributory factors included the 1973 oil crisis and its economic fallout, a slump in air travel, and opposition from campaigners concerned about the impact on the fragile environment in the Øresund and around the island. The plan was abandoned in 1979 and further investment was made in Copenhagen Airport instead. When the Øresund fixed link was eventually built in the 1990s, it was routed 1 km south of Saltholm to avoid damaging the island and the surrounding shallow waters.

== See also ==
- List of Danish islands
