= Albert Vilhelm Bøgh =

Norwegian actor (1843–1927)

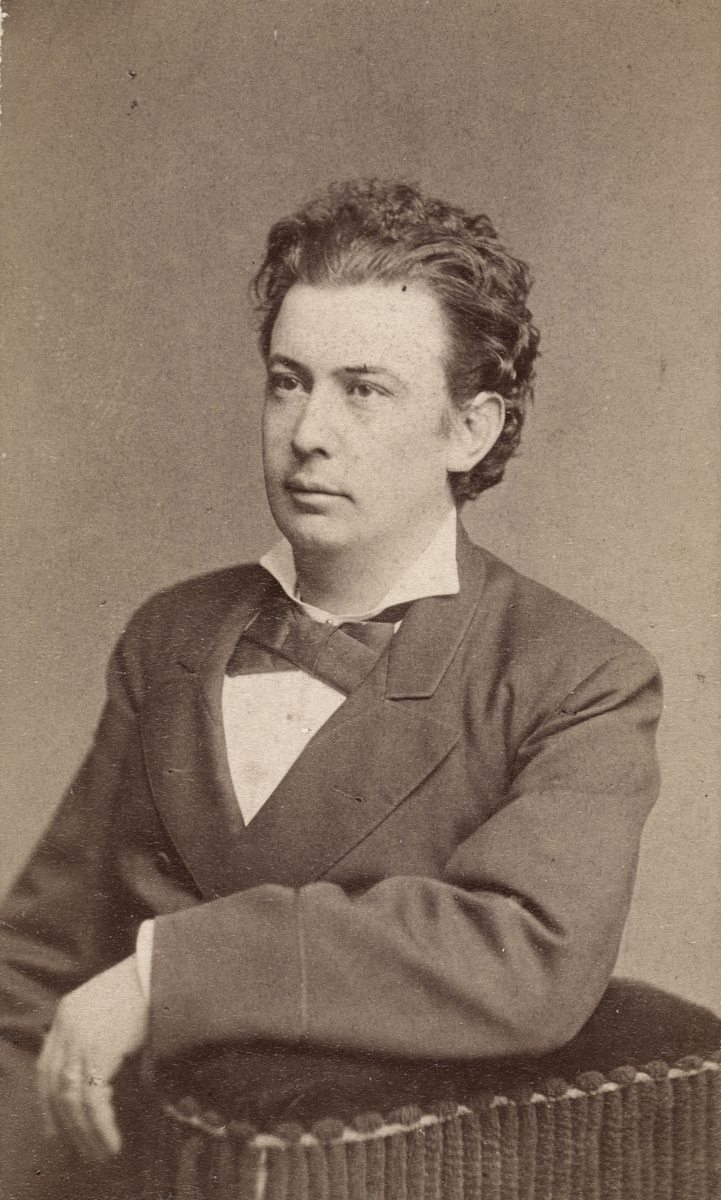
Albert Vilhelm Bøgh

Albert Vilhelm Bøgh (29 April 1843 – 11 April 1927) was a Norwegian actor.

He was a son of district stipendiary magistrate Ole Bøgh (1810–1872) and his wife Anna Dorothea Sagen (1809–1850). He was the brother of Johan Bøgh. On the maternal side he was a grandson of Lyder Sagen, and on the paternal side he was a nephew of archivist Vilhelm Frimann Christie Bøgh.

He worked at Christiania Theatre from 1871 to 1872, at Møllergatens Teater from 1872 to 1876. Then, for the rest of his career he worked at Den Nationale Scene.

Through his brother Johan, he was the uncle of tourism administrator Christen Gran Bøgh.
