= Johan Bøgh =

Norwegian museum director (1848–1933)

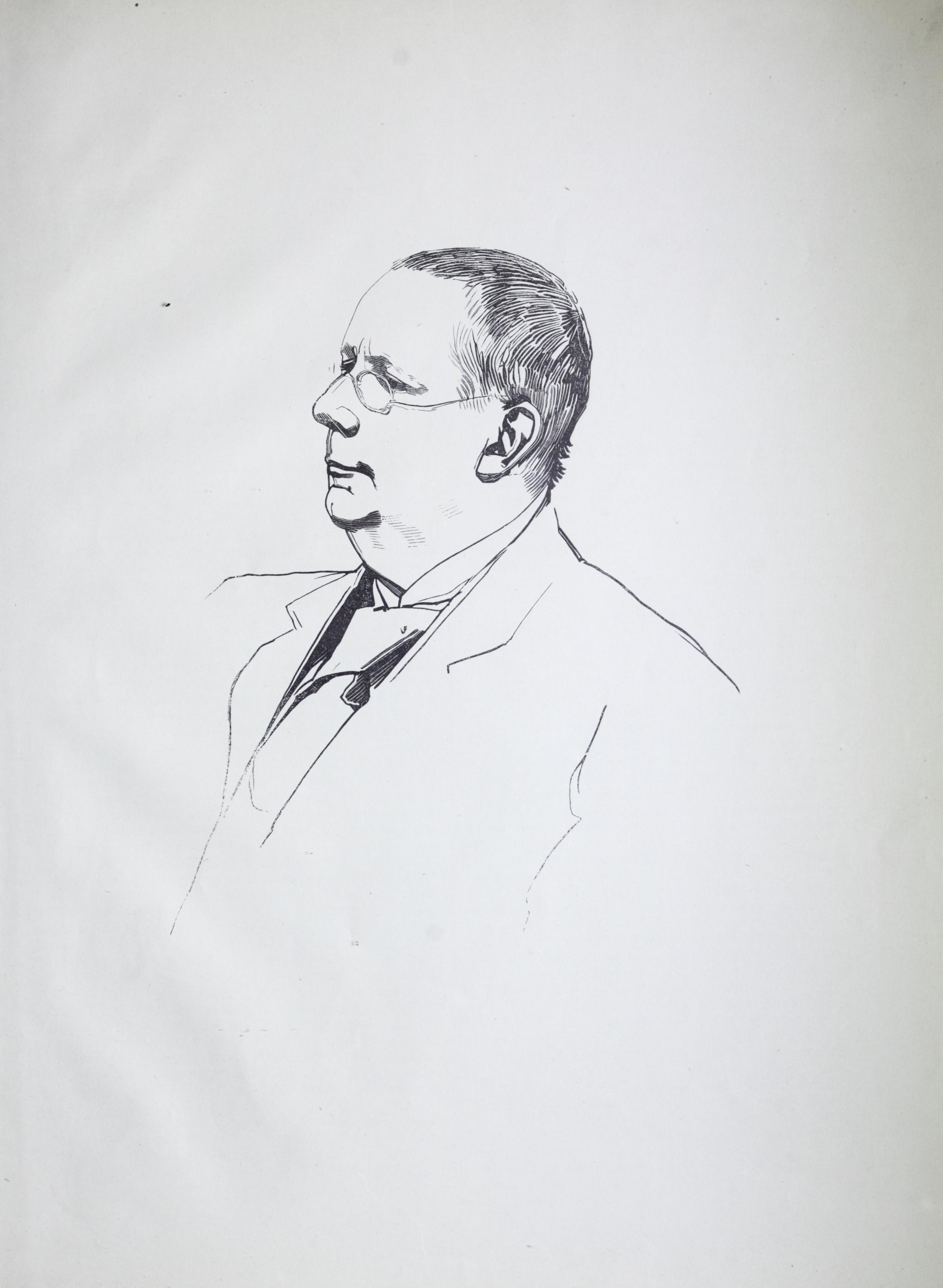
Drawing of Bøgh, before 1895

Johan Wallace Hagelsteen Bøgh (27 May 1848 – 22 July 1933) was a Norwegian museum director and art historian based in the city of Bergen.

== Personal life ==
He was born in Bergen as the son of district stipendiary magistrate Ole Bøgh (1810–1872) and his wife Anna Dorothea Sagen (1809–1850). He was the brother of Albert Vilhelm Bøgh. On the maternal side he was a grandson of Lyder Sagen.

In October 1875 he married Wenche Gran (1852–1916), a daughter of merchant Christen Knagenhjelm Gran and granddaughter of politician Jens Gran. Their son Christen Gran Bøgh was a notable jurist and tourism administrator. His wife was a sister of Gerhard Gran, and his wife's sister Hanne married Gerhard Armauer Hansen.

== Career ==
After school, Bøgh first had a short stay at the Royal Frederick University, where he became involved in the Norwegian Students' Society. He then tried his talent as a fiction writer, but failed to break through. He then held various jobs in the cultural sector in Bergen. Among others, he helped found the theatre Den Nationale Scene in 1876, was the first chairman of the board and later artistic leader during four seasons. He founded the West Norway Museum of Decorative Art in 1889, and was manager for this institution until 1931, when he retired 83 years old. The latter institution benefitted from donations from Christian Sundt and Johan Munthe. He also helped found Norske Museers Landsforbund, a forerunner of Norges Museumsforbund. After his abandoned education in Kristiania, Bøgh had undertaken independent study trips in continental Europe, and he was able to publish several books on art history. He was also involved in Bergens Kunstforening, and was an honorary member of Vestlandske Kunstindustriforening from 1932.

He was a member of the Norwegian Academy of Science and Letters from 1913 to his death. He was proclaimed a Knight, First Class of the Royal Norwegian Order of St. Olav in 1899, and was upgraded to Commander in 1926. He was also a Knight of the Danish Order of the Dannebrog and the Russian Order of Saint Stanislaus. He died in 1933 in Bergen.

Cultural offices
Preceded by Nils Wichstrøm	Artistic leader of Den Nationale Scene; 1879-1880	Succeeded by John Grieg
Preceded by John Grieg	Artistic leader of Den Nationale Scene; 1881-1884	Succeeded by Gunnar Heiberg
