= Harald Beyer (literary historian) =

Norwegian literary historian

Carl Harald Beyer (15 November 1891 – 26 July 1960) was a Norwegian literary historian and lecturer, literary critic, textbook writer and professor of European literature at the University of Bergen.

== Early and personal life ==
Beyer was born in Bergen, as a son of bookseller Freydar Dekke Høegh von Krogh Beyer (1864–1933) and his German-born wife Flora Charlotte Müller (1862–1912). He was grandson of bookbinder Fredrik Beyer (1827–1903). He married Eidis Johannessen in 1919, and was the father of literary historian Edvard Beyer.

== Career ==
Beyer finished his secondary education at Bergen Cathedral School in 1910, and took his final university degree in 1917, in language history. He received Hartvig Lassen's gold medal for his dissertation Henrik Wergeland og Henrich Steffens in 1919. He became dr.philos. in 1924, with the thesis Søren Kierkegaard og Norge. He was a teacher in secondary school for 34 years, in Haugesund from 1917 and later at Bergen Cathedral School from 1922, except for one year at the University of Hamburg from 1930 to 1931. During his period as a teacher, he was a literary critic for the newspaper Bergens Tidende, amassing about 1600 articles. Selections of his articles were issued in Fra Holberg til Hamsun. Skrevet og talt (1934), and in the posthumous memorial Norsk og fremmed. Artikler i utvalg (1961). He wrote several books, including Norwegische Literatur (1927), Norsk litteraturhistorie til orientering og selvstudium (1933) and Henrik Wergeland. Thi Frihed er Himmelens Sag (1946). He also held radio lectures for the Norwegian Broadcasting Corporation.

He was appointed professor in European literature at the recently established (1948) University of Bergen in 1951. His Norsk litteraturhistorie from 1952 was the most used textbook in its field at Norwegian universities between the 1950s and the mid-1990s. It was also published in the United States. His work Nietzsche og Norden (two volumes) came in 1958 and 1959.

Beyer was a member of the Norwegian Academy of Science and Letters from 1946. In Bergen he was chair of Den Nationale Scene and praeces in the Selskapet til Videnskapenes Fremme. He was also a deputy member of the Norwegian Language Council, representing Riksmål writers. He died in July 1960 in Bergen. A festschrift planned for his seventieth birthday was instead released as a memorial book, titled Norsk og fremmed.
