= Vilhelm Frimann Christie Bøgh =

Norwegian archivist (1817–1888)

Vilhelm Frimann Christie Bøgh (2 June 1817 – 1 July 1888) was a Norwegian archivist.

He was a son of district stipendiary magistrate Christopher Benedict Bøgh (1773–1825) and his wife Andrea Perbøl (1785–1859). Having lost his father at an early age, he was raised by Wilhelm Frimann Koren Christie. He started his career as an assistant in the National Archival Services of Norway, and in 1854 he was hired as the diocesan archivist in the Diocese of Trondhjem. He was also a school teacher in Trondhjem, as well as a theatre instructor. He was known as a "prominent personality in the social life of Trondhjem".

In April 1854 in Fresvik he married Jensine Dorothea Hille (1823–1914), a sister of bishop Arnoldus Hille. He was a brother of jurist Ole Bøgh, and thus the uncle of Johan and Albert Vilhelm Bøgh. He died in July 1888 in Trondhjem.
