= Geoffrey Layton =

Royal Navy Admiral (1884-1964)

Admiral Sir Geoffrey Layton GBE KCB KCMG DSO
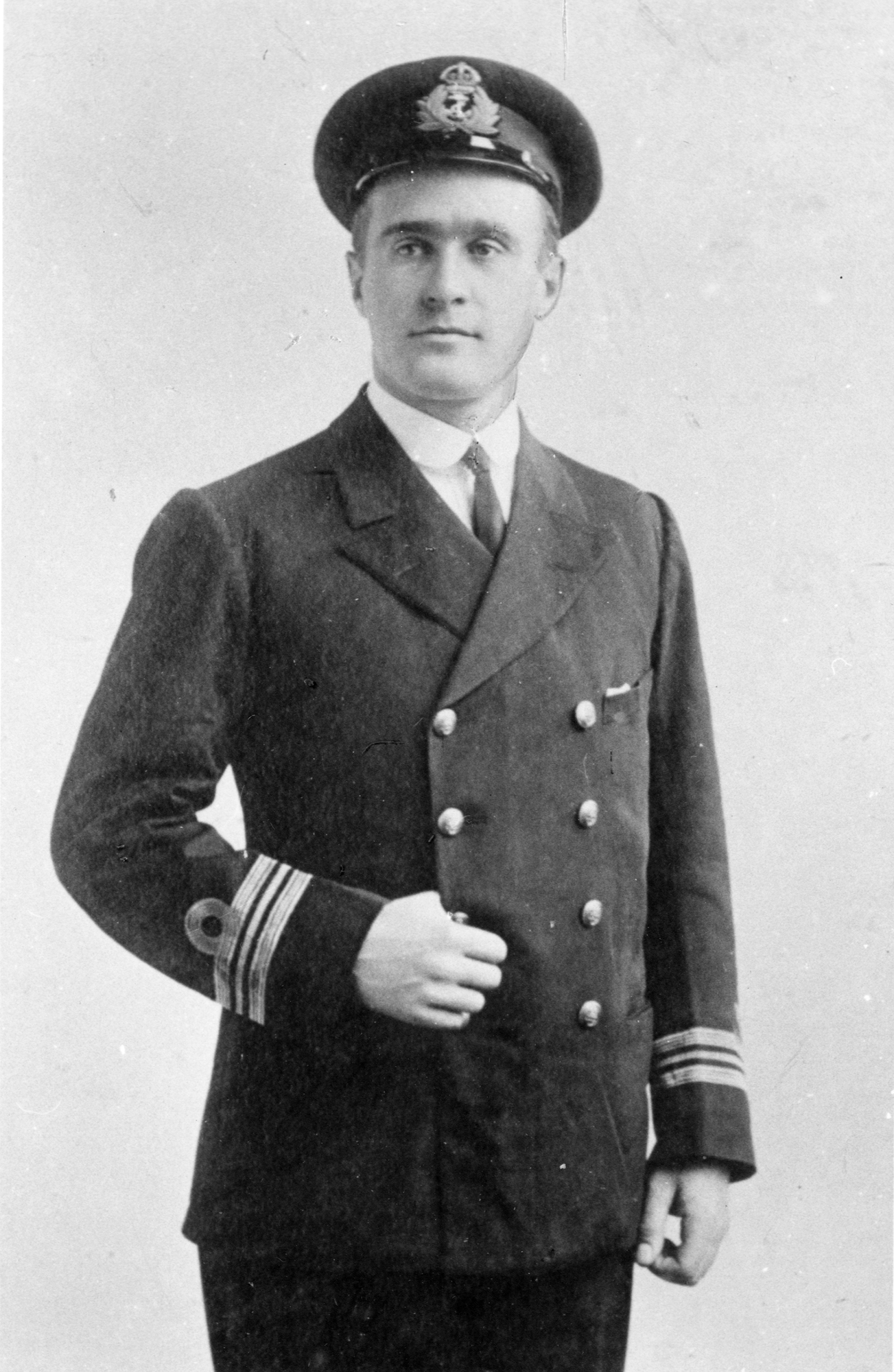
- Layton in 1915
- Born: 20 April 1884; Liverpool, England
- Died: 4 September 1964 (aged 80); Portsmouth, England
- Spouse: Eleanor Langley (m. 1908)
- Military career
- Allegiance: United Kingdom
- Branch: Royal Navy
- Service years: 1899–1947
- Rank: Admiral
- Commands: Commander-in-Chief, Portsmouth (1945–47); Commander-in-Chief, Ceylon (1942–45); Eastern Fleet (1941–42); China Station (1940–41); 1st Battle Squadron (1939–40); Battlecruiser Squadron (1938–39); HMS Renown (1937–38); HMS Swordfish (1916–17); HMS E13 (1914–15)
- Conflicts: First World War; Second World War
- Awards: Knight Grand Cross of the Order of the British Empire; Knight Commander of the Order of the Bath; Knight Commander of the Order of St Michael and St George; Distinguished Service Order; Knight of the Legion of Honour (France); Grand Cross of the Order of Orange-Nassau (Netherlands)

Admiral Sir Geoffrey Layton, GBE, KCB, KCMG, DSO (20 April 1884 – 4 September 1964) was a Royal Navy officer. He was in command of the submarine HMS E13 when, under attack from German vessels, it ran aground off the Danish coast during the First World War. Despite this incident, he rose to senior command in the Second World War and retired in 1947. His final appointment had been as Commander-in-Chief, Portsmouth.

== Early life and career ==
Layton was the son of a Liverpool solicitor, George Layton, and was educated at Eastman's Royal Naval Academy. He joined the Royal Navy as a naval cadet on 15 May 1899 on HMS Britannia. Following this he served as a midshipman aboard cruisers in the English Channel and off the south coast of the United States.

Layton took his lieutenant's course and was promoted to that rank on 30 November 1905. He then he joined the submarine branch of the navy, in which he had his first command. From 1910 he did two years general service and returned to submarines in 1912, commanding several of them during the First World War.

== First World War ==
On 18 August 1915 Layton's submarine, HMS E13, was ordered to the Baltic to assist the Russians, but he ran aground on Saltholm off the Danish coast. E13 was destroyed early the following morning by a German torpedo boat, killing half his men. Layton and the others were interned at Copenhagen. Three months later, disguised as a local sailor, he managed to return to Britain. In 1916–17, he commanded the experimental steam submarine S-1. At the end of the war he was awarded the Distinguished Service Order.

== Interbellum ==
Layton was promoted to captain on 31 December 1922 and held the post of Chief of Staff to the Rear Admiral Submarines. In the late 1920s he was appointed Deputy Director of Operations at the Admiralty and in 1930 he attended a course at the Imperial Defence College. From 1931 to 1933, he was posted as Chief of Staff on the China Station. He commanded the Royal Naval Base at Portsmouth from 1934 to 1936, when he became Director of Personnel Services at the Admiralty.

Layton then transferred to battlecruisers, firstly Renown. Then, following another period at the Admiralty, he commanded the Battlecruiser Squadron, flying his flag on Hood, from August 1938 until August 1939. Layton was then appointed second-in-command of the Mediterranean Fleet, firstly under Admiral Sir Dudley Pound and later under Admiral Sir Andrew Cunningham. He is recorded as commanding the 1st Battle Squadron, consisting of the battleships HMS Barham, HMS Warspite, and HMS Malaya, on the outbreak of war on 3 September 1939.

== Second World War ==
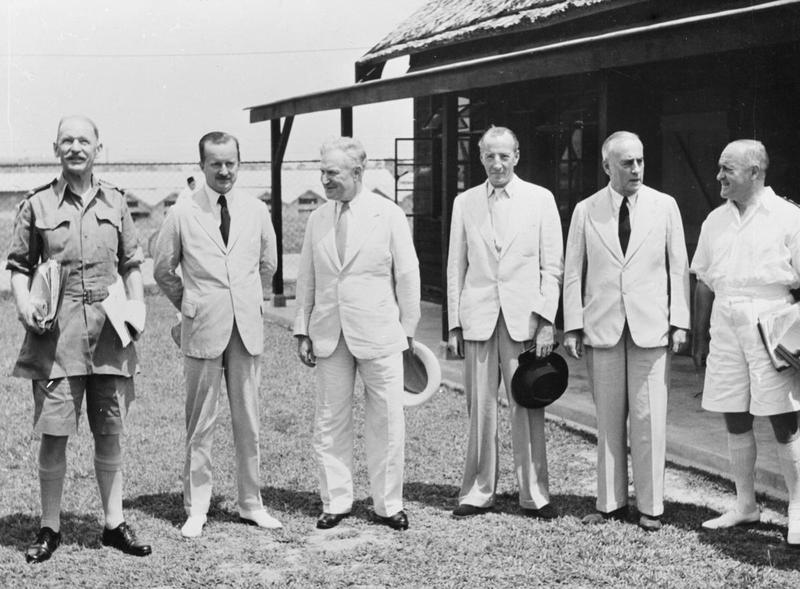
Layton at a conference in Singapore on 2 December 1941.

Layton took command of the China Station in September 1940. In May 1941, he was informed that Admiral Sir Tom Phillips would succeed him. The battleship HMS Prince of Wales and battlecruiser HMS Repulse were deployed to Singapore in December 1941 as a deterrent to Japanese attack, with Phillips in Prince of Wales. Layton broadcast a message to the Malayan people, telling them of the improvements to defence on the arrival of these two capital ships in Singapore. On 10 December, he handed over the naval command to Phillips and prepared to return home. Later that day, Prince of Wales and Repulse were sunk off Malaya by Japanese air attack. Layton was then recalled as Commander-in-Chief, Eastern Fleet.

In January 1942, the short-lived American-British-Dutch-Australian Command (ABDACOM) was formed, to direct Allied forces in South East Asia and the South West Pacific. On 5 January, the deputy commander of ABDA naval forces, Rear Admiral Arthur Palliser, made Layton the senior naval officer at Tanjung Priok, the port for Batavia (Jakarta), Java. His main role was organising better convoy protection.

Following the Fall of Singapore and dissolution of ABDA, command of the Eastern Fleet was given to Sir James Somerville. Layton was appointed Commander-in-Chief, Ceylon (Sri Lanka) and temporary rank of Admiral in March 1942, with wide-ranging powers that subordinated the civilian authorities. There was much to be done. Defences and organisation were inadequate; harbour facilities were inefficiently run with many transports left waiting in exposed anchorages and Layton was horrified. He immediately set about improvements to radar, civil defence and Colombo's air raid system.

Time was against Layton, however, as were the current appreciations of Japanese capabilities. On 5 April 1942 Japanese aircraft attacked Colombo, Ceylon, sinking an auxiliary cruiser, a submarine depot ship and a destroyer. It could have been far worse; reacting to intelligence reports, warships and merchant ships had been ordered to disperse from harbours where they would have been easy targets. Two cruisers, however, were found at sea and sunk. On 9 April the Japanese attacked Trincomalee harbour and later found and sank an aircraft carrier, a destroyer and a corvette, all at sea. There were further Japanese raids on shipping along India's east coast. The Japanese returned to the Pacific, and on 11 April Layton sent a signal that the enemy had withdrawn from Ceylon to Singapore.

The defence of the island of Ceylon had not been a total fiasco, even though there was criticism that the radar system had been switched off as it was a Sunday. The Royal Air Force and Fleet Air Arm squadrons on the island, although with few effective aircraft (50 Hawker Hurricanes against some 300 Japanese aircraft) plus some obsolete or unsuitable ones (Catalinas, Blenheims and Fulmars) provided some defence. Up to 19 Japanese aircraft were shot down during the Colombo raid, for the loss of 27 Hurricanes and 12 other aircraft. There was a similar number of Japanese aircraft shot down over Trincomalee for the loss of 11 Hurricanes and Fulmars (of 25 available aircraft).

The early warning system set up by Layton was a shambles: the aircraft at Ratmalana were still on the ground when the Japanese aircraft flew overhead. Japanese aircraft had flown over the Ceylonese coastline for half an hour, in full view of everybody, before reaching Ratmalana.

Despite the impact of the raids on Ceylon, Layton stayed as Commander-in-Chief until 1945 and was appointed a Knight Commander of the Order of St Michael and St George for his work and was promoted to admiral. He also received the Dutch Order of Orange-Nassau and the French Legion of Honour.

Arthur Bryant, in Turn of the Tide, puts the contribution made by Admiral Layton in a very positive light. "Thanks to the timely action of the island's Commander-in-Chief what had happened in the Ceylon skies over Easter proved one of the turning points of the war... Through the foresight shown by the Chiefs of Staff (in appointing one supreme Commander, Layton, to the island) and the presence of mind of the two admirals to whom the island and the Eastern Fleet had been entrusted, the air defences of Ceylon – the key to the Indian Ocean – remained unbroken and the fleet safe at sea. For the first time since the start of the Japanese war a major assault by the Rising Sun had been repulsed."

== Later life ==
Following the war, Layton returned to the United Kingdom as Commander-in-Chief, Portsmouth, a post he held until his retirement in 1947. Sir Geoffrey Layton died at Portsmouth on 4 September 1964 at the age of 80. He was the father of three daughters, the youngest being Suzanne Kyrle-Pope, the traveller and author. Their relationship was not a happy one.

== See also ==
- Indian Ocean Raid
- Participation of Ceylon in World War II
- South-East Asian Theatre of World War II#Indian Ocean

== References and sources ==
Military offices
Preceded by Sir Andrew Cunningham	Commander, Battlecruiser Squadron; 1938–1939	Succeeded by Sir William Whitworth
Preceded by Sir Percy Noble	Commander-in-Chief, China Station; 1940 – December 1941	Succeeded by Sir Tom Phillips
Preceded by Sir Tom Phillips	Commander-in-Chief, China Station; December 1941 – December 1941	Succeeded by Post discontinued
Preceded by New post (Previously East Indies Station)	Commander-in-Chief, Eastern Fleet; December 1941–1942	Succeeded by Sir James Somerville
Preceded by Sir Geoffrey Arbuthnot	Commander-in-Chief, East Indies Station; 1942–1944	Succeeded by Sir Arthur Power
Preceded by Sir Charles Little	Commander-in-Chief, Portsmouth; 1945–1947	Succeeded by Lord Fraser of North Cape
