= Åse Hiorth Lervik =

Norwegian literary scholar (1933–1997)

- Born: 2 June 1933; Oslo, Norway
- Died: 3 November 1997 (aged 64); Oslo
- Occupation: Literary scholar
- Employer: University of Tromsø

Åse Hiorth Lervik (2 June 1933 – 3 November 1997) was a Norwegian literary researcher.

== Biography ==
Lervik was born in Oslo on 2 June 1933.

Her doctorate thesis from 1971 was a study on Henrik Ibsen's play Brand. She was professor at the University of Tromsø from 1972. She was secretary for Edda. Scandinavian Journal of Literary Research from 1962, and editor of the journal from 1972 to 1985.

Her books include Ideal og virkelighet. Ekteskapet som motiv hos Jonas Lie (1965), Elementær verslære from 1972, and a book on the literary works of Cora Sandel from 1977.

She died in Oslo on 3 November 1997.
