= Nils Wichstrøm =

Norwegian actor and stage instructor

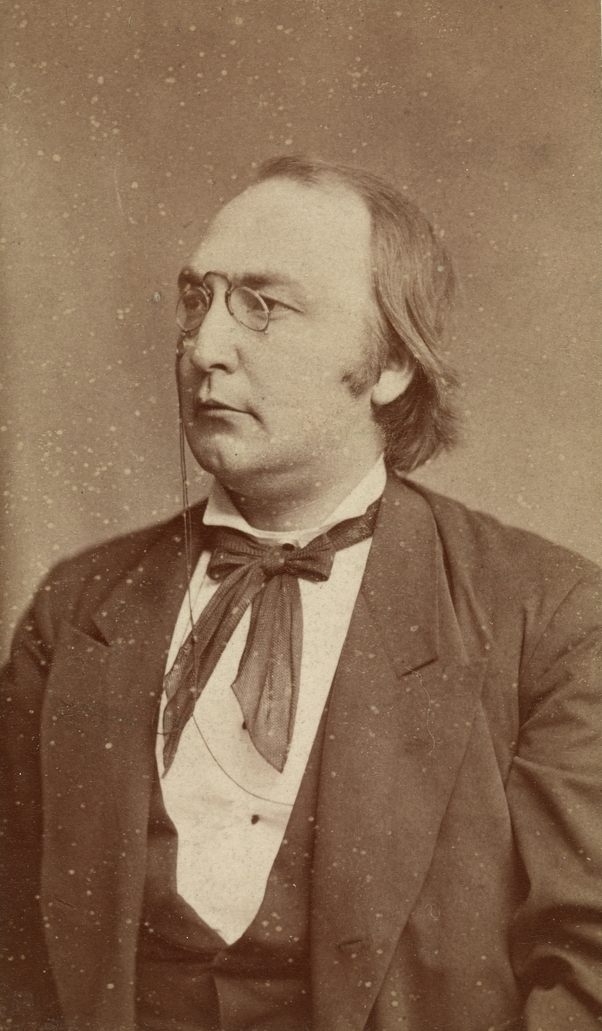
Image of Nils Wichstrøm

Nils Wichstrøm (5 September 1848 – 1 December 1879) was a Norwegian actor and stage instructor. He joined the Bergen theatre Den Nationale Scene from its start in 1876, and was the theatre's first stage instructor and artistic leader from 1876. He died from appendicitis in 1879.

Cultural offices
Preceded by	Artistic leader of Den Nationale Scene; 1876-1879	Succeeded by Johan Bøgh (acting)
