= HMS E13 =

Submarine of the Royal Navy

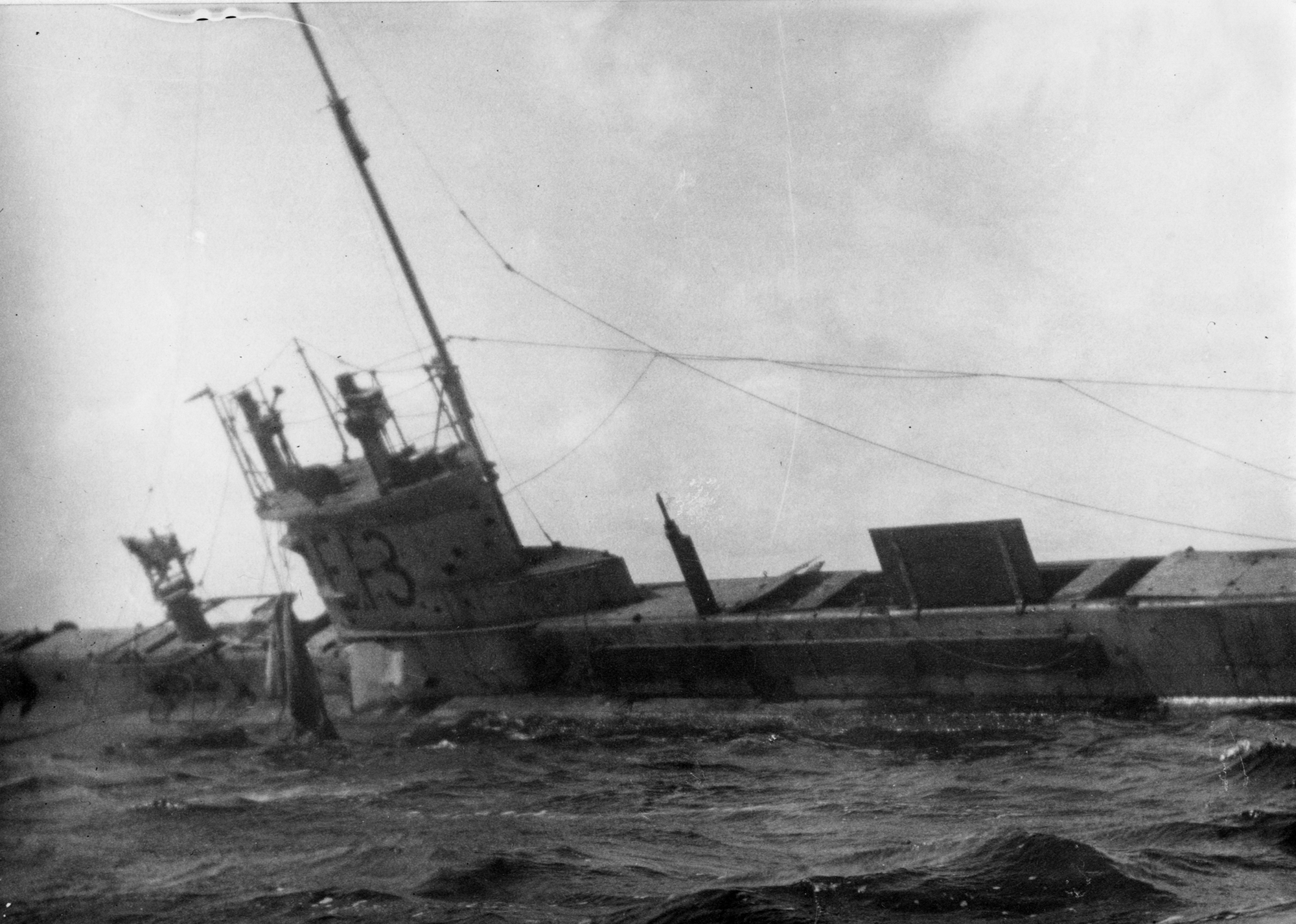
- E13 aground at Saltholm in the Øresund in 1915 after being attacked by German torpedo boats

History

United Kingdom
- Name: E13
- Builder: HM Dockyard, Chatham
- Cost: £101,900
- Laid down: 16 December 1912
- Launched: 22 September 1914
- Commissioned: 9 December 1914
- Fate: Ran aground, 18 August 1915, raised, then sold for scrap 14 December 1921
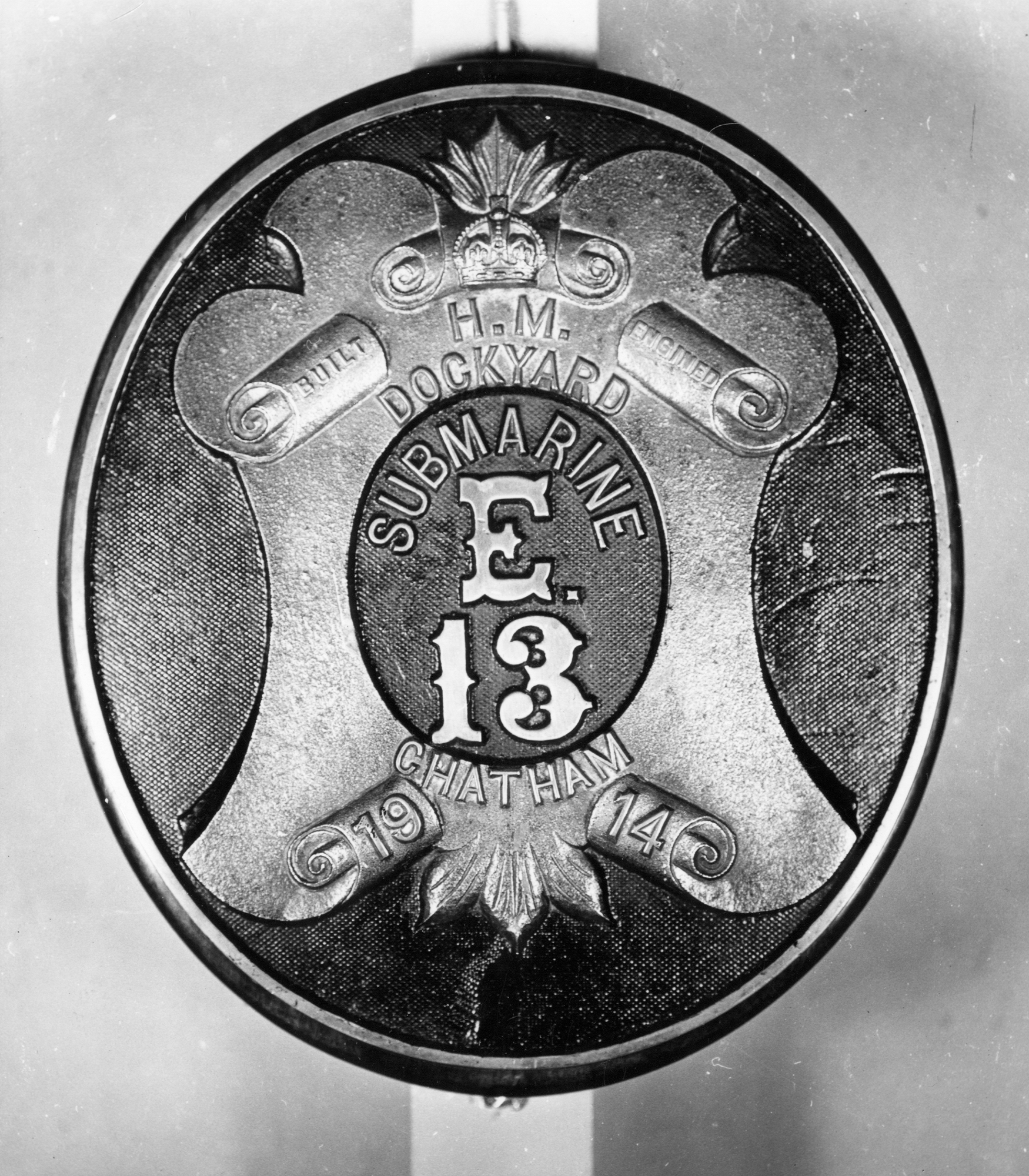
- Badge

General characteristics
- Class & type: E-class submarine
- Displacement: 662 long tons (673 t) surfaced; 807 long tons (820 t) submerged
- Length: 181 ft (55 m)
- Beam: 15 ft (4.6 m)
- Propulsion: 2 × 800 hp (597 kW) diesels; 2 × 420 hp (313 kW) electric; 2 screws
- Speed: 15.25 knots (28.24 km/h; 17.55 mph) surfaced; 10.25 knots (18.98 km/h; 11.80 mph) submerged
- Range: 3,000 nmi (5,600 km) at 10 kn (19 km/h; 12 mph); 65 nmi (120 km) at 5 kn (9.3 km/h; 5.8 mph)
- Complement: 30
- Armament: 5 × 18 inch (450 mm) torpedo tubes (2 bow, 2 beam, 1 stern)

HMS E13 was a British E class submarine built by HM Dockyard, Chatham. E13 was laid down on 16 December 1912 and was commissioned on 9 December 1914. The hull cost £101,900 (£10,165,900 in 2025).

== Design ==
Like all post-E8 British E-class submarines, E13 had a displacement of 662 long tons (673 t) at the surface and 807 long tons (820 t) while submerged. She had a total length of 180 feet (55 m) and a beam of 22 feet 8.5 inches (6.922 m). She was powered by two 800 horsepower (600 kW) Vickers eight-cylinder two-stroke diesel engines and two 420 horsepower (310 kW) electric motors. The submarine had a maximum surface speed of 16 knots (30 km/h; 18 mph) and a submerged speed of 10 knots (19 km/h; 12 mph). British E-class submarines had fuel capacities of 50 long tons (51 t) of diesel and ranges of 3,255 miles (5,238 km; 2,829 nmi) when travelling at 10 knots (19 km/h; 12 mph). E13 was capable of operating submerged for five hours when travelling at 5 knots (9.3 km/h; 5.8 mph).

As with most of the early E class boats, E13 was not fitted with a deck gun during construction, but one was mounted later. She had five 18 inch (450 mm) torpedo tubes: two in the bow, one either side amidships, and one in the stern; a total of 10 torpedoes were carried.

E-Class submarines had wireless systems with 1 kilowatt (1.3 hp) power ratings; in some submarines, these were later upgraded to 3 kilowatts (4.0 hp) systems by removing a midship torpedo tube. Their maximum design depth was 100 feet (30 m) although in service some reached depths of below 200 feet (61 m). Some submarines contained Fessenden oscillator systems.

== Crew ==
Her complement was three officers and 28 men.

== Service history ==
HMS E13 had a relatively short career during World War I. On 14 August 1915, she was despatched from Harwich, accompanied by her sister vessel HMS E8. The two submarines had orders to sail to the Baltic Sea to interdict German shipping, particularly vessels carrying iron ore shipments from Sweden. At around 01:00 on 18 August 1915, the submarine ran aground in shallow water near Saltholm island in the Øresund between Malmö and Copenhagen, because of a defective gyrocompass. At dawn she became clearly visible. At 05:00 the Royal Danish Navy torpedo boat Narhvalen appeared on the scene and hailed the E13's commander, Lt Cdr Geoffrey Layton, informing him that he had 24 hours to refloat his vessel and leave before he and his crew would be interned for violating Denmark's neutrality.

The E13's crew sought to lighten the submarine by pumping out tanks and discharging fuel, but she had grounded in only 10 feet (3.0 m) of water and would not move. Layton realised that he would not be able to refloat the E13 before the deadline passed and sent his first lieutenant ashore to arrange a tow or, if this was impracticable, to negotiate terms for internment. He was unable to contact the Admiralty for assistance, as the Germans were jamming radio frequencies.

At 10:28 the German torpedo boat G132 arrived but withdrew when the Danish torpedo boats Støren and Søulven approached. A third Danish torpedo boat, the Tumleren, arrived shortly afterwards.

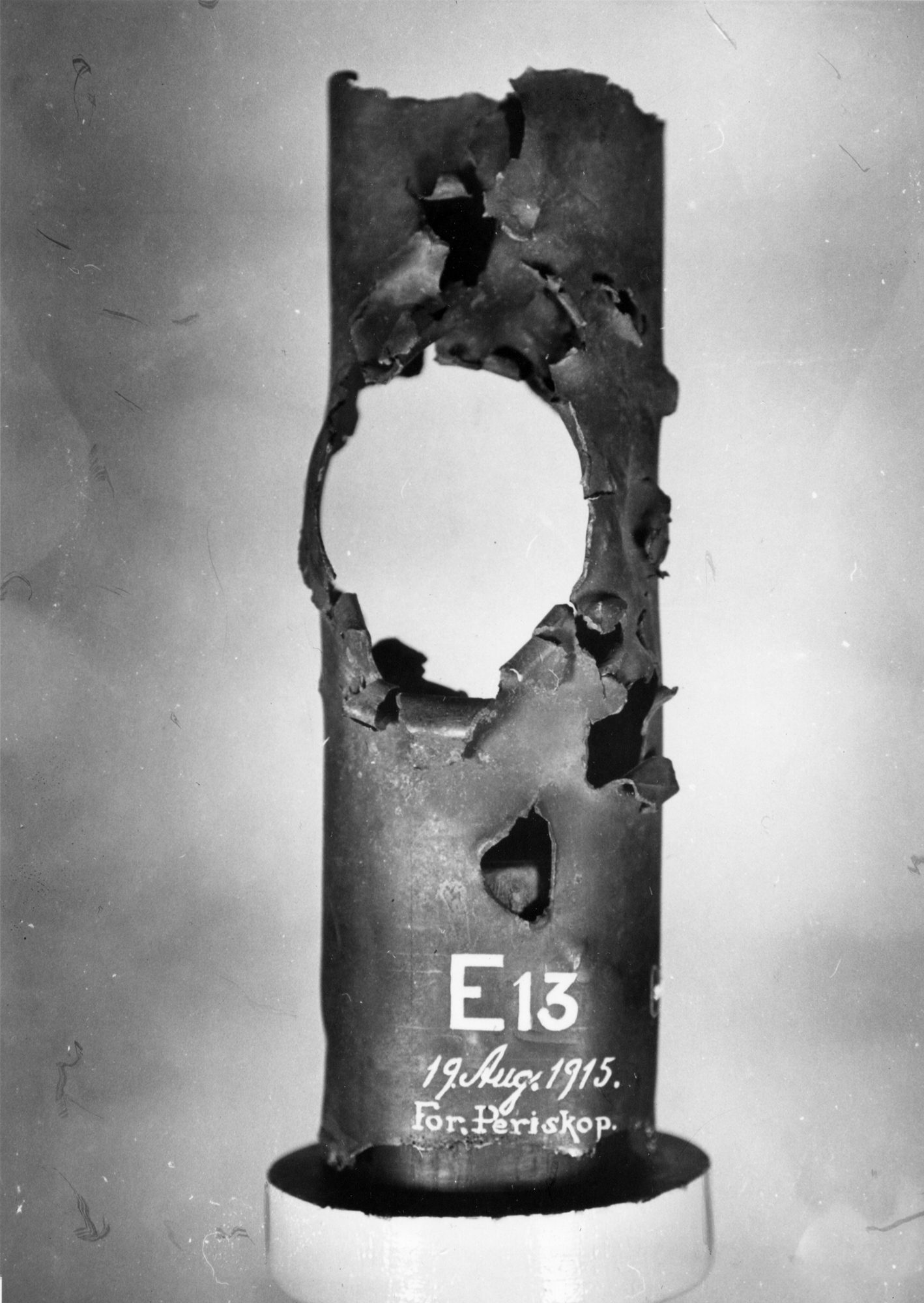
The periscope of HMS E13

Meanwhile, the commander of the G132, Oberleutnant zur See Paul Graf von Montgelas, had informed Rear Admiral Robert Mischke by radio about the E13's grounding. German naval operations against the Russian-held city of Riga were at a critical stage and Mischke felt that he could not afford to let the E13 pass into the Baltic, where it could threaten the German offensive in the Gulf of Riga. He ordered G132 and another torpedo boat to destroy the submarine. The two vessels returned to Saltholm and opened fire on the E13 with torpedoes, machine-guns and shell fire from a range of 300 yards. The submarine was hit repeatedly and set on fire. Seeing this, Lt Cdr Layton ordered the submarine to be abandoned, but the firing continued while his men were in the water. The engagement ended when the Danish torpedo boat Søulven placed herself between the submarine and the two German ships, which withdrew. Fourteen of the E13's crew were killed in the attack and one was missing, presumed killed.

The E13's fifteen surviving crew members were interned at the Copenhagen Navy Yard by the Danes for the rest of the war. Layton refused to give his parole and eventually escaped along with his first officer, returning to England to continue the war. He went on to have a distinguished career and commanded the British Eastern Fleet during the Second World War.

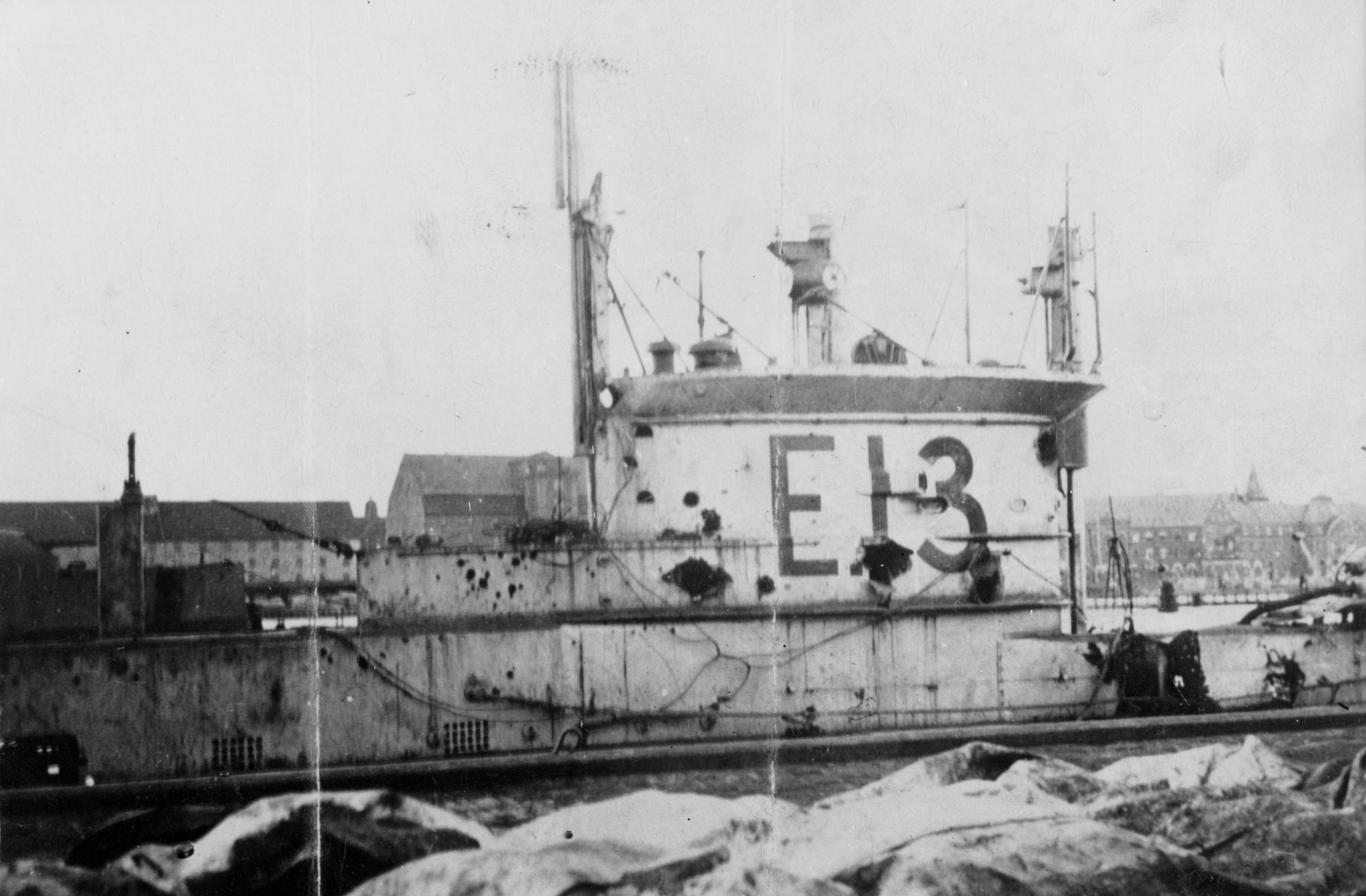
E13 alongside dock at Copenhagen, showing damage caused by German gunfire

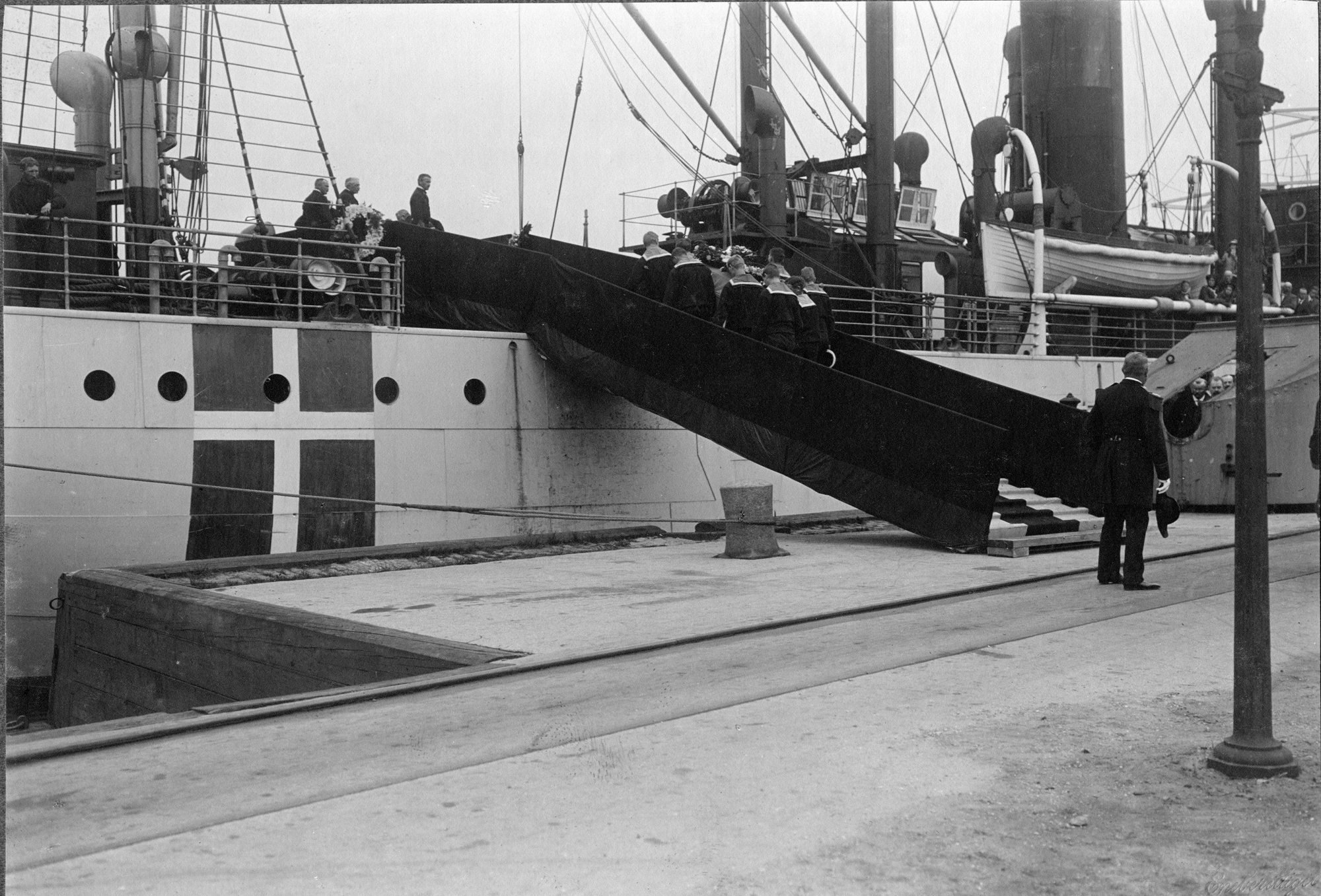
E13 crew killed in action being borne aboard SS Vidar for repatriation.

The Danish government fitted out the mail steamer Vidar as a temporary chapel to transport the bodies of the casualties back to Hull, accompanied by the Danish torpedo boats Springeren and Støren. Notwithstanding Denmark's neutrality, the dead British sailors were given full honours when their bodies were brought ashore, as a contemporary report described:

There was a touching funeral scene to-night in the Sound. In a brilliant sunset the Danish torpedo boat Soridderen passed slowly in with her flag at half-mast. A naval squadron formed a guard of honour around the bodies of the British dead. At all the fortifications, and on the whole of the ships, flags were immediately lowered as a mark of respect. Hundreds of spectators were gathered at Langelinie, all of whom reverently saluted. On shore a naval and military salute was given.

The incident caused outrage in Britain and Denmark, since it was clearly a serious breach of international law. The Danish newspaper National Tidende published an indignant leading article protesting at the Germans' violation of Danish neutrality. Politiken reported that the Danish government had protested to Germany, pointing out that the E13 had not been destroyed in any kind of pursuit but while she was lying damaged on neutral territory. The London Times fulminated in a leading article that "the unjustifiable slaughter of the men of the E13 is one more notch in the long score we have to settle with the homicidal brood of Prussia." The German government subsequently apologised to Denmark, stating that "instructions previously given to commanders of German vessels to respect neutrality have once more been impressed upon them."

Although the E13 was refloated by the Danes and towed to Copenhagen, she was so badly damaged by the German attack that her repair was not viable. On 6 February 1919, she was sold by the British government to a Danish company for 150,000 Danish kroner (about £8,330 at 1919 prices). On 14 December 1921, she was resold for scrap.

== See also ==
- SMS Dresden
