= Edvard Beyer =

Norwegian historian

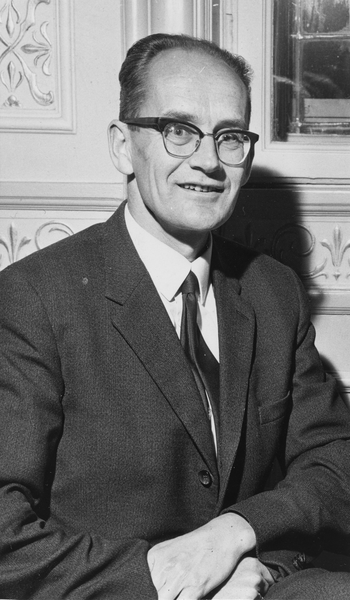
- Born: 6 October 1920; Haugesund, Norway
- Died: 10 November 2003 (aged 83); Bærum
- Occupation: Literary historian
- Parent: Harald Beyer
- Awards: Fritt Ord Honorary Award (1990)

Edvard Freydar Beyer (6 October 1920 – 10 November 2003) was a Norwegian literary historian, literary critic, and professor at the University of Oslo from 1958 to 1990.

== Early and personal life ==
Beyer was born in Haugesund and grew up in Bergen, as a son of literary historian, later professor Harald Beyer (1891–1960), and Eidis Johannessen (1893–1977). He was married to nurse Aslaug Ryssdal from 1946.

== Career ==
Beyer studied philology, and graduated with the dissertation Livsgleden som problem i Ibsens diktning, which was published in the journal Edda in 1948. The next ten years he worked as an independent literary critic for Bergens Tidende, and eventually as a lecturer at the University of Bergen. He took his dr.philos. degree in 1956, with the thesis Hans E. Kinck; livsangst og livstro (about Hans E. Kinck, issued in two volumes, in 1956 and 1965). His doctorate thesis is regarded as his most important research work. It is regarded as one of the most voluminous monographies on a poet in Norway.

Beyer was appointed professor in Nordic literature at the University of Oslo in 1958, succeeding Francis Bull. He also took over Bull's position as editor-in-chief of Edda, from 1962 to 1972. He was main editor for Norges litteraturhistorie (six volumes, 1974–1975), where he also wrote volume three and part of volume two, on literature from the 1800s. He was the Norwegian editor for the Scandinavian project Verdens litteraturhistorie (twelve volumes, 1971–1974). During the 1980s Beyer administered and contributed to the project Norsk litteraturkritikks historie 1770–1940, the history of Norwegian literary criticism from 1770 to 1940. He edited the collected works of Hans E. Kinck (18 volumes), and the short story anthologies Perler i prosa (1966) and Norske noveller (1967).

Beyer was chairman of Arts Council Norway from 1978 to 1985. He was a member of the Norwegian Academy of Science and Letters from 1959. He retired as a professor in 1990. In the same year he received the Fritt Ord Honorary Award. He died in November 2003 in Bærum.
