= Edda. Scandinavian Journal of Literary Research =

- Editor: Ole Karlsen
- Editor: Lisbeth Pettersen Wærp
- Editor: Henning Howlid Wærp
- Former editors: Former editors Gerhard Gran (1914-1925); Francis Bull (1925-1960); Edvard Beyer (1962-1972); Åse Hiorth Lervik (1972-1985); Jorunn Hareide (1992-1993); Steinar Gimnes (1994-1995); Liv Bliksrud and Preben Meulengracht Sørensen (1996-1997); Torill Steinfeld (1998-1999); Harald Bache-Wiig and Olav Solberg (2000); Unni Langås, Andreas G. Lombnæs and Jahn Thon (2001-2005)
- Categories: literary research
- Frequency: 4 per year
- Publisher: Universitetsforlaget
- Founded: 1914
- Country: Norway
- Based in: Oslo
- Language: Norwegian, Swedish, Danish, English
- Website: www.idunn.no/ts/edda
- ISSN: 0013-0818

Edda. Scandinavian Journal of Literary Research (Norwegian: Edda. Nordisk tidsskrift for litteraturforskning) is a magazine for research on Scandinavian literature, and for literary researchers in the Scandinavian countries. The magazine is based in Oslo.

== History ==
Edda was founded by Gerhard Gran in 1914. The magazine's first publishing house was Aschehoug. Gran edited the magazine until his death in 1925. Literary historian Francis Bull was editor-in-chief from 1925 to 1960. Edvard Beyer edited the magazine from 1962 to 1972. Åse Hiorth Lervik was editor from 1972 to 1985.

In the 1960s Edda published articles written in the languages of Scandinavian countries, and its focus was exclusively on their literature.

== Recent years ==
The editorial responsibility for the journal has circulated between Universities in Norway. It was edited from the University of Trondheim from 1991 to 1995, and from the University of Oslo from 1996 to 2000. From 2001 to 2005 the journal was housed at the University of Agder, Kristiansand, from 2006 to 2010 at the University of Tromsø and from 2011 to 2014 at the University of Bergen. As of 2015 the journal is again housed at the University of Oslo, where it is edited by Ståle Dingstad, Thorstein Norheim and Ellen Rees.

=== Special issues ===
Two special issues were 4/2004, which includes several articles originally given as papers at the conference The Gendered Body, Aesthetics and Experience at the University of Agder, and 6/2006, which was dedicated to Henrik Ibsen at the 100th anniversary of his death.

=== Research articles ===
Works that have been studied in recent years include classical texts by Ibsen, Amalie Skram, Arne Garborg, August Strindberg, Henrik Wergeland, Knut Hamsun, Tarjei Vesaas and Bellman, and texts by the contemporaries Jon Fosse, Dag Solstad and Lars Saabye Christensen. Other subjects discussed include Literature from Greenland, and Scandinavian literature in England.
