= Gerhard Gran =

Norwegian literary historian, professor, magazine editor, essayist and biographer

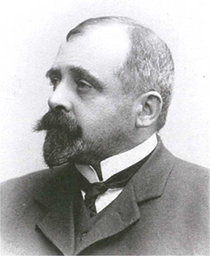
- Born: 9 December 1856; Bergen
- Died: 7 April 1925 (aged 68); Oslo
- Citizenship: Norwegian
- Education: Royal Frederick University
- Known for: magazine editor and founder, notably Samtiden and Edda
- Scientific career
- Fields: history of literature
- Workplaces: Royal Frederick University professor 1900–1919

Gerhard von der Lippe Gran (9 December 1856 – 7 April 1925) was a Norwegian literary historian, professor, magazine editor, essayist and biographer.

== Personal life ==
Gran was born in Bergen as the son of merchant Christen Knagenhjelm Gran (1822–1899) and his wife Constance Mowinckel (1827–1889). He was the paternal grandson of politician Jens Gran, and a second cousin of botanist Haaken Hasberg Gran and aviator Tryggve Gran. On the maternal side was a first cousin of Wenche von der Lippe Mowinckel, who was a granddaughter of Jacob von der Lippe and mother of Arthur, Waldemar and Gerhard C. Kallevig. Wenche lived with Gerhard Gran's family while attending school.

In October 1887 he married Maren Elisabeth Bull Sømme (1857–1930), a daughter of merchant and politician Jacob Jørgen Kastrup Sømme and his wife Johanne Margrethe "Hanna" Bull Kielland, granddaughter of Jacob Kielland and first cousin of novelist Alexander Lange Kielland and painter Kitty Lange Kielland. As such Gerhard Gran was the brother-in-law of painter Jacob Kielland Sømme. Through his sisters he was a brother-in-law of art historian Johan Bøgh and physician Gerhard Armauer Hansen.

== Career ==
Gran finished his secondary education at Bergen Cathedral School in 1874, and graduated from the Royal Frederick University in Kristiania with the cand.mag. degree in 1881. He then returned to Bergen to work as a school teacher. He was hired at Bergen Cathedral School in 1895.

In 1898 the post as professor of literary history at the Royal Frederick University had become vacant. Gran applied for the post, and a contest between Gran and Hjalmar Christensen ensued. Gran delivered a thesis which was considered inferior, but he was deemed the better lecturer. In 1899 he received the appointment, the assessment committee noting that Gran would probably fill "the holes present in his knowledge" with time. Gran left Bergen Cathedral School, and formally took the professor seat in 1900. He remained in this position until 1919, when he resigned to concentrate on his various writing endeavors.

Gran had co-founded the Samtiden periodical in 1890 with Jørgen Brunchorst, and was the editor of this magazine until his death in 1925. The periodical touched upon a number of subjects, including philosophical, religious, social, political and scientific topics. When the magazine changed its house of publishing to H. Aschehoug & Co in 1900, Gran profited from his professional relationship with publisher William Martin Nygaard. In 1914, much due to the support of Nygaard, he started the magazine Edda. Scandinavian Journal of Literary Research, and was this magazine's first editor-in-chief, from 1914 to 1925. He was also the Norwegian editor of the Scandinavian Nordisk Tidsskrift from 1904. He initiated the first edition of the encyclopedia Norsk biografisk leksikon, and was co-editor for the first two volumes. He wrote biographies of the writers Bjørnstjerne Bjørnson (1910), Jean Jacques Rousseau (1910-1911), Henrik Ibsen (1918), Alexander Kielland (1922), and Charles Dickens (1925, posthumously). He also published the book Det Kongelige Fredriks universitet 1811–1911, chronicling the history of the University of Kristiania during its first hundred years. Collections of his essays were published as well.

In 1884 he was a co-founder of the Norwegian Association for Women's Rights.

Gran was appointed Officer of the French Légion d'honneur and a Knight, First class of the Royal Norwegian Order of St Olav in 1905. He was also a member of the Norwegian Academy of Science and Letters. He died in 1925 in Oslo.
