= Boqeh =

Boqeh بقعه
- Village
- Location within Iran
- Coordinates: 29°39′55″N 50°32′15″E
- Country: Iran
- Province: Bushehr
- County: Ganaveh
- Bakhsh: Central
- Rural District: Hayat Davud

Population (2006)
  - Total: 25
- Time zone: UTC+3:30 (IRST)
  - Summer (DST): UTC+4:30 (IRDT)

Boqeh (Persian: بقعه, also Romanized as Boq‘eh; also known as Bogh‘eh) is a village in Hayat Davud Rural District, in the Central District of Ganaveh County, Bushehr Province, Iran. At the 2006 census, its population was 25, in 4 families.
