= Jens Gran =

Norwegian politician (1794–1881)

Jens Gran (8 October 1794 – 23 January 1881) was a Norwegian politician.

He was elected to the Norwegian Parliament in 1839, 1845 and 1848, representing the constituency of Bergen.

He was the father of businesspersons Christen Knagenhjelm Gran (1822–1899) and Jens Gran, Jr. (1828–1894), and a grandfather of Gerhard Gran, Haaken Hasberg Gran and Tryggve Gran.
