= Carl Bøgh =

Danish painter

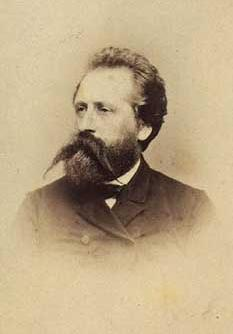
Carl Bøgh; photograph by Georg Emil Hansen

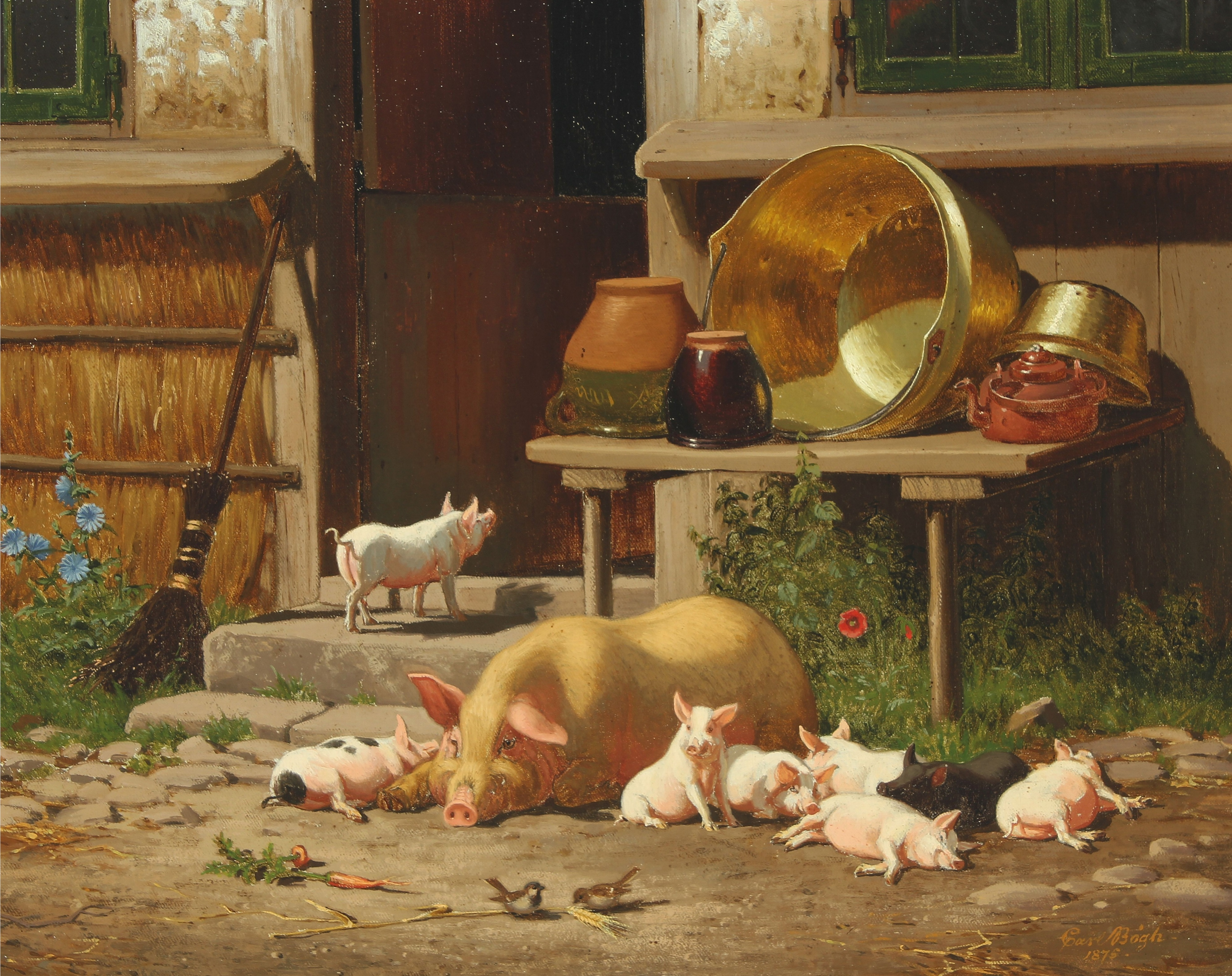
Summer Day with a Sow and Her Piglets

Carl Henrik Bøgh (3 September 1827, in Copenhagen – 19 October 1893, in Copenhagen) was a Danish painter, best known for his scenes with animals.

== Biography ==
His father, Hans Henrik Bøgh, was a school teacher. His older brother, Erik Bøgh, became a journalist and playwright. In 1863, he married Cathrine Sophie Henriette Møller, the daughter of a District Bailiff (Herredsfoged), the equivalent of a local judge. Their daughter, Elisabeth (1865–1948), also became a painter.

After serving as a soldier in the First Schleswig War, he attended the Royal Danish Academy of Fine Arts, where he studied with Johan Ludwig Lund, and decided to specialize in animal painting. He first had a showing in 1854, in the Spring Exhibition at Charlottenborg Palace. Three years later, he was awarded the Neuhausenske Prize.

From 1860 to 1861, he made a study trip abroad, with the travel scholarship from Academy; visiting Brussels and Antwerp, but spending most of his time in Paris. In 1870 and 1875, some of his works were purchased by the "Royal Painting Collection" (now the National Gallery of Denmark). In 1873, he became a professor.

His paintings of deer were among his most popular. He also made painting expeditions to Norway and Sweden.

== Sources ==
- Bögh, Carl Henrik, In: Ulrich Thieme, Felix Becker (Eds.): Allgemeines Lexikon der Bildenden Künstler von der Antike bis zur Gegenwart, Vol. 4: Bida–Brevoort. Wilhelm Engelmann, Leipzig 1910, pg.189
- Bøgh, Carl Henrik In: Carl Frederik Bricka (Ed.): Dansk biografisk Lexikon, Vol.3: Brandt–Clavus, 1889, pgs.311–312, @ Projekt Runeberg
- Karl Henrik Bögh, In: Bernhard Meijer (Ed.): Nordisk familjebok konversationslexikon och realencyklopedi, Vol.4 Brant–Cesti, 1905 pg.870, @ Projekt Runeberg
