= Erik Bøgh =

Danish journalist, playwright and songwriter

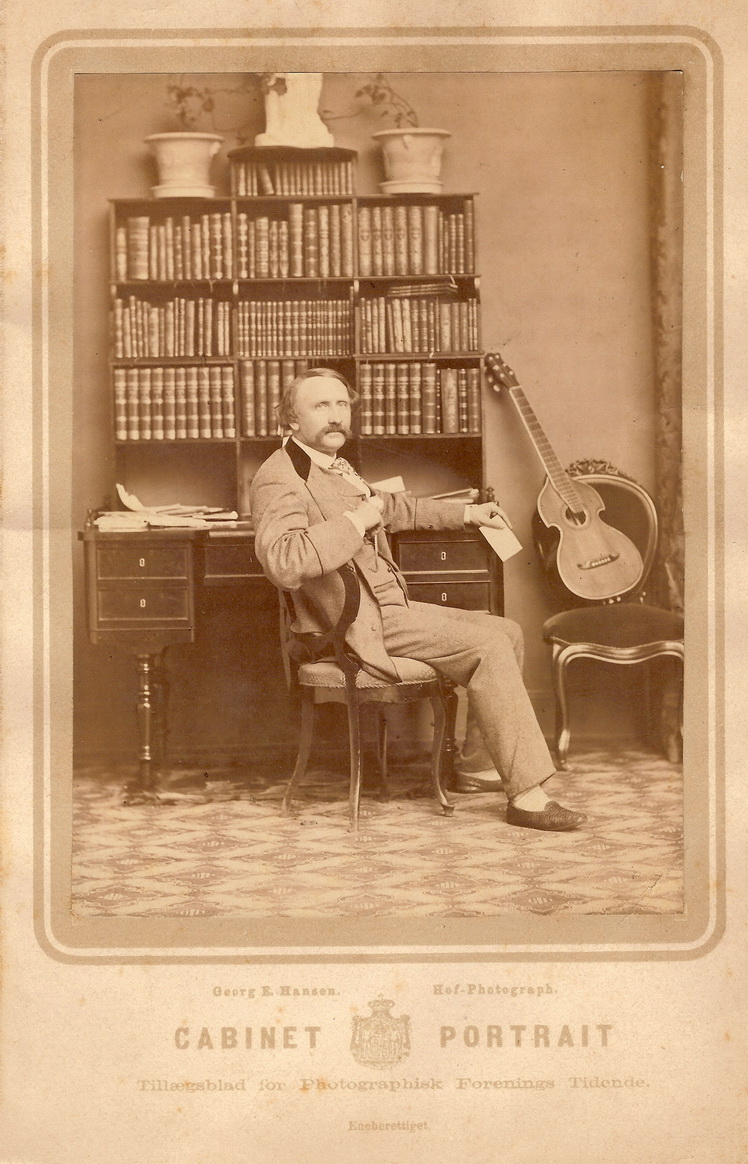
Erik Bøgh (1822–1899), photo by Georg E. Hansen

Erik Bøgh (17 June 1822 – 17 August 1899) was a Danish journalist, playwright and songwriter. From 1881 to 1899 he worked at the Royal Danish Theatre.

Bøgh authored the one-act musical comedy Valbygaasen (The Goose of Valby), which was first performed in Copenhagen in 1856. Bøgh died in Copenhagen.
