= Lyder Sagen =

Norwegian educator and author

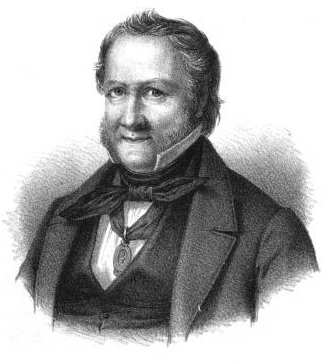
Lyder Sagen

Lyder Sagen (13 March 1777 – 16 June 1850) was a Norwegian educator and author.
