= Gerda Ring =

Norwegian stage actress and stage producer (1891–1999)

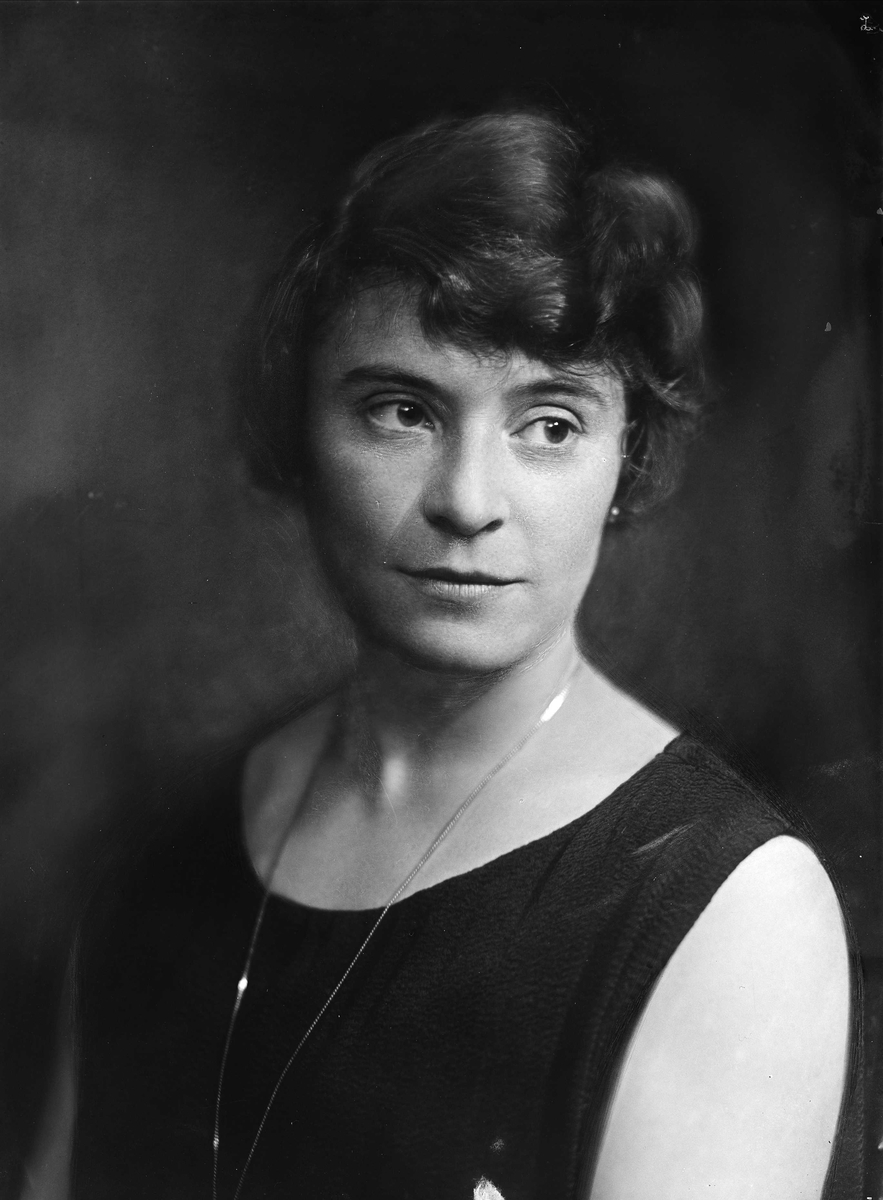
- Gerda Ring in 1924
- Born: 11 May 1891; Kristiansand, Norway
- Died: 12 January 1999 (aged 107); Oslo, Norway
- Resting place: Oslo Western Civil Cemetery
- Occupation: Actress
- Spouse: Halfdan Christensen
- Children: Bab Christensen; Pelle Christensen
- Parent(s): Thorvald August Kirsebom; Barbra Ring
- Awards: King's Medal of Merit in gold (1951); Order of St. Olav (1956); Order of the Polar Star

Gerda Ring (11 May 1891 – 12 January 1999) was a Norwegian stage actress and stage producer. She was the daughter of writer Barbra Ring, and married actor and theatre director Halfdan Christensen in 1922. They were parents of the actors Bab Christensen and Pelle Christensen.

== Career ==
Ring had her stage debut at Det Nye Teater in Copenhagen in 1911, in the play Kongens hjerte, written by Barbra Ring (Gerda's mother). She played at the National Theatre from 1912 to 1961. Among her roles were "Hedvig" in Ibsen's The Wild Duck, and "Eleonora" in Strindberg's Easter. Her first stage production was an adaption of Gunnar Heiberg's play Gerts have in 1930.

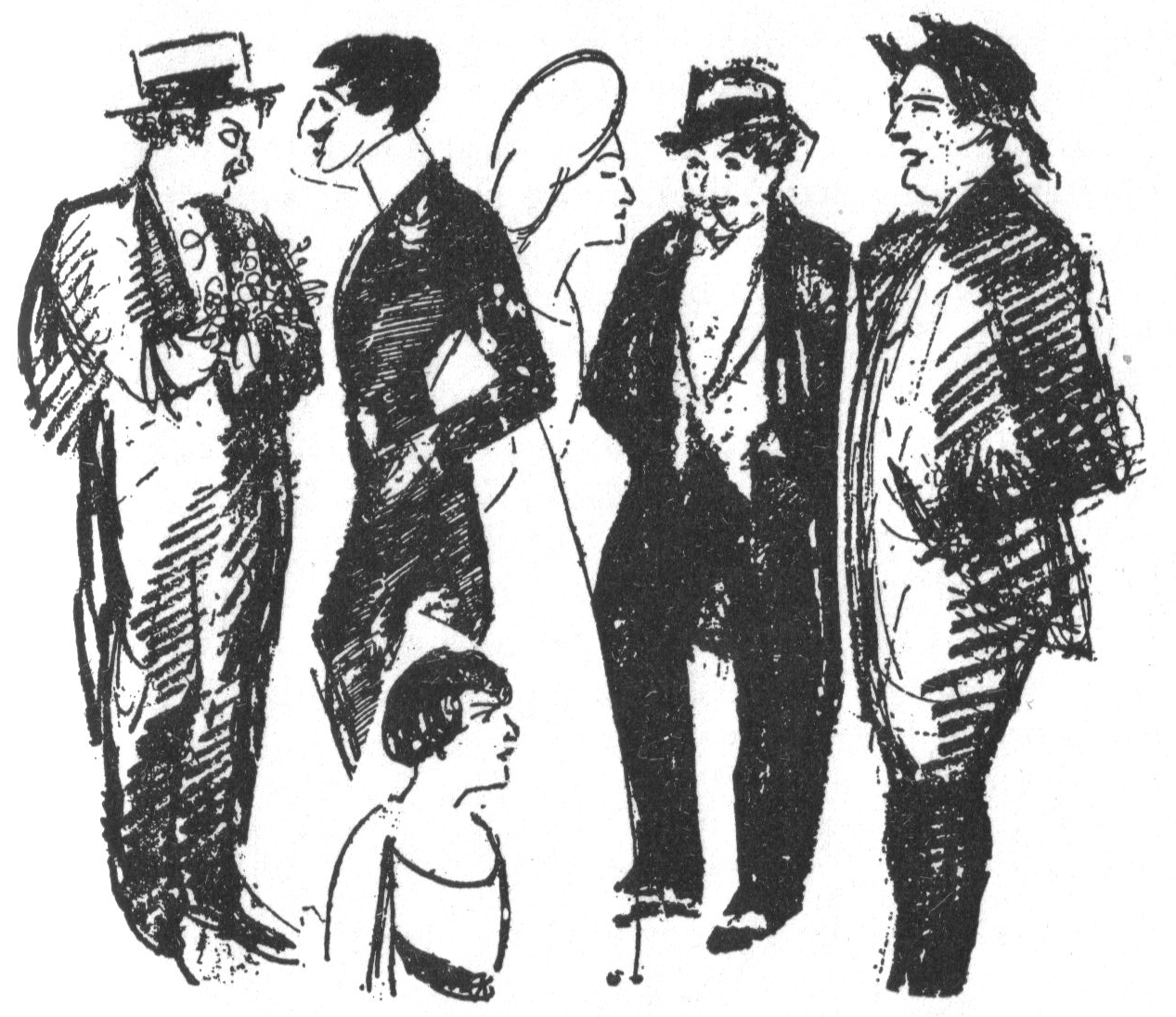
Heiberg's play Gerts have, Nationaltheatret 1917. Gerda Ring as "Charlotte" (lower middle). Drawing by Henrik Rom.

During the Second World War Ring played a leading role in the theatre conflict which emerged in 1941, being on the board of the Norwegian Actors' Equity Association. One of the disagreements was whether the actors were obliged to participate in radio productions. After several actors, including Ring, refused to participate for Radioteatret in May 1941, the Gestapo intervened, and the group had their working permissions revoked. This was 21 May, and already the same evening a strike was effective in Oslo, and from the next day also in Bergen and Trondheim. Several theatre leaders were eventually arrested, but the strike lasted until end of June, after long negotiations, which also included German threats of death by court-martial.

In 1942 Ring had to flee to Sweden, where she started the theatre group Fri Norsk Scene, together with her husband Halfdan Christensen.

After the war Ring staged several productions, including plays by Tennessee Williams, Jean-Paul Sartre and Henrik Ibsen. She received the Critics' Prize for her adaptation of Sartre's Dirty Hands in 1950. In addition to her work at the National Theatre, she also produced for Radioteatret, for Oslo Nye Teater, Riksteatret, Den Nationale Scene and Rogaland Teater, and for theatres in Denmark, Iceland and China.

== Honours ==
Ring was awarded the King's Medal of Merit in gold in 1951. She was appointed Knight, First Class of the Royal Norwegian Order of St. Olav in 1956, and was also Knight of the Swedish Order of the Polar Star.

== Death ==
When she died in 1999; she was 107 years old.
