= To levende og en død =

To levende og en død may refer to:

- To levende og en død (novel), a 1931 novel by Sigurd Christiansen
- To levende og en død (film), a 1937 Norwegian film adaptation
- Two Living, One Dead, a 1961 British-Swedish film adaptation
