= Per Gjersøe =

Norwegian actor, stage instructor and film director

- Born: 13 October 1908; Tønsberg, Norway
- Died: 6 November 1980 (aged 72); Oslo
- Occupation(s): Actor, stage instructor and film director

Per Gjersøe (13 October 1908 – 6 November 1980) was a Norwegian actor, stage instructor and film director.

== Biography ==
Gjersøe was born in Tønsberg on 13 October 1908. He made his stage debut at Nationaltheatret in 1938. From 1945 to 1950 he was assigned at Studioteatret, and later at Det nye Teater, Riksteatret, Fjernsynsteatret, Teatret Vårt in Molde, and at Den Nationale Scene in Bergen. His first independent stage production was an adaptation of Arthur Koestler's play Twilight Bar in 1946, and in 1947 he staged Ingmar Bergman's play Hets. In 1962 he co-directed the film Tonny, based on Jens Bjørneboe's novel Den onde hyrde, in cooperation with Nils R. Müller. He was among the co-founders of the regional theatre for Møre og Romsdal, Teatret Vårt, in 1972.

He died in Oslo on 6 November 1980.
