= A Dead Man Among the Living =

- Directed by: Bořivoj Zeman
- Written by: Elmar Klos; Borivoj Zeman
- Based on: To levende og en død by Sigurd Christiansen
- Starring: Karel Höger; Eduard Dubský; Vjaceslav Irmanov; Zdenka Procházková
- Cinematography: Petr Rovný
- Edited by: Josef Dobřichovský
- Music by: Jirí Šust
- Release date: 1949
- Country: Czechoslovakia
- Language: Czech

A Dead Man Among the Living (Czech: Mrtvý mezi živými) is a 1949 Czech thriller film directed by Bořivoj Zeman and starring Karel Höger, Eduard Dubský and Vjaceslav Irmanov. The film is based on the 1931 novel To levende og en død (lit. Two living and one dead) by the Norwegian writer Sigurd Christiansen. Following an armed robbery at his office, a postal worker suffers a crisis of conscience.

== Cast ==
- Karel Höger - Jirí Valta - postal assistant
- Eduard Dubský - Robert Munk - postal assistant
- Vjaceslav Irmanov - Cyril Popov - musician (as Václav Irmanov)
- Zdenka Procházková - Helena Fejfarová - gardener
- Lída Matousková - Marta Klecková
- Jana Hrdličková - Jana Klecková - daughter
- Radim Nikodém - Ivo Fejfar - son
- Vladimír Řepa - Inspector
- František Klika - Chief
- Milos Hájek - Emil Klecka - postal auditor
- Frantisek Šlégl - Karel Fejfar - sergeant major
- Zdeňka Baldová - Mr. Fejfarová
- Rudolf Deyl - Officer
- Blažena Slavíčková - Official
- Jindřich Láznička - Postal attendant
- Stanislav Neumann - Postal attendant at train
- Josef Belský - Major
- Josef Chvalina - Police officer
- Bohus Hradil - Officer at postal management 1
- Ferdinand Jarkovský - Officer at postal management 2
- Josef Horánek - Officer at postal management 3
- J.O. Martin - Post director
- Anna Kadeřábková - Girl at gardening
- Václav Švec - Rescuer
- Milivoj Uzelac - Conductor
- Vlasta Jelínková - Mr. Gabrielová
- Vladimír Ráž - Officer at package postal
- Jaroslav Štercl - Member of singer choir

== See also ==
- To levende og en død (1937)
- Two Living, One Dead (1961)

== Bibliography ==
- Soila, Tytti & Söderbergh-Widding, Astrid & Iverson, Gunnar. Nordic National Cinemas. Routledge, 1998.
