= Baardson =

Baardson or Bårdson is a Norwegian surname. Notable people with the surname include:

- Bentein Baardson (born 1953), Norwegian actor and theatre director
- Brynjolv Baardson (1921–2002), Norwegian sailor and businessman

== See also ==
- Baardsen
