= Paul Vinsnes =

Norwegian politician

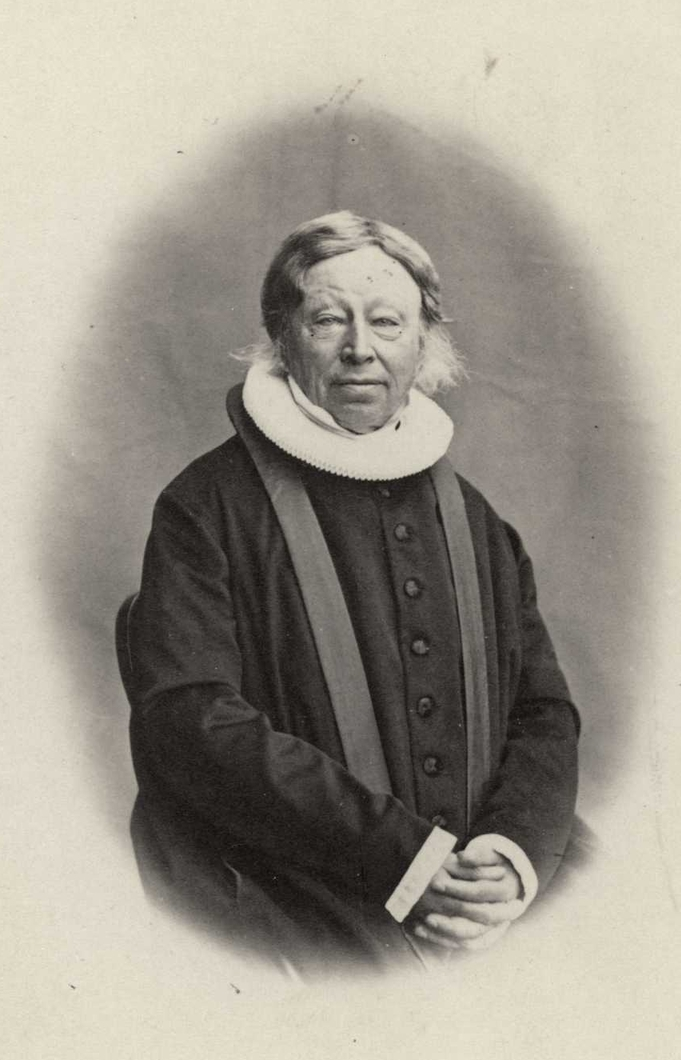
Paul Vinsnes

Paul Vinsnes (18 October 1794 – 23 August 1889) was a Norwegian priest and politician.

== Biography ==
Vinsnes was born in Drammen in Buskerud, Norway. He was the son of Johan Fredrik Winsnes (1768–1838) and his wife Barbara Holm (1774–1828). His father had been a parish priest to Råde Church in Østfold, later in Stange Church in Hedmark. His grandfather had been a Magistrate for the Gudbrandsdalen district of Norddalen in Oppland. He graduated from the University of Copenhagen as cand.theol. with laud in 1814.

He first worked for two years as a teacher in Drammen, then a catechist at Our Saviour's Church in Kristiania (now Oslo Cathedral) before he became chaplain in Vang in Hedmark in 1819. He was then appointed as vicar in Trysil Church in Hedemark in 1820, Hurdal Church in Akershus in 1822, Aurdal Church in Nord-Aurdal in 1827. In 1830, he was assigned to the parish of Brunlanes near Larvik. While there, he was elected the first mayor of Brunlanes Municipality during the period 1838–1846. He was elected to the Norwegian Parliament in 1839, 1842 and 1844, representing the constituency of Jarlsberg og Laurviks Amt (now Vestfold). He subsequently returned to the priesthood as dean at Vang Church in Hedemark. He retired in 1870.

In 1817, Paul Vinsnes married Hanna Olava Strøm (1789–1872), niece of professor Hans Strøm. They had several children. Their great-granddaughter, Barbra Ring, was a notable author.
