= Hans Jacob Nilsen =

Norwegian actor and director

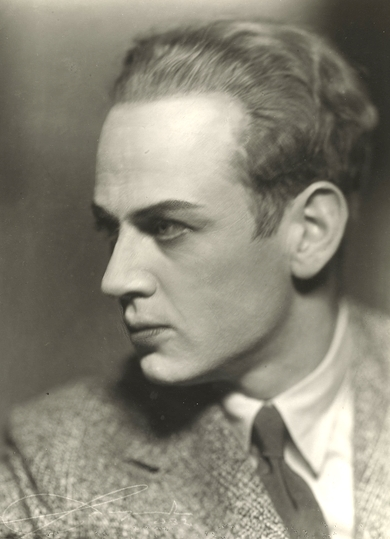
- Hans Jacob Nilsen, 1932
- Born: 8 November 1897; Fredrikstad, Norway
- Died: 6 March 1957 (aged 59); Oslo
- Occupations: Actor, theatre director and film director
- Relatives: Knut Frydenlund (son-in-law)

Hans Jacob Nilsen (8 November 1897 – 6 March 1957) was a Norwegian actor, theatre director and film director. He was a theatre director at Den Nationale Scene, at Folketeatret, and for two separate periods at Det Norske Teatret.

== Personal life ==
Nilsen was born in Fredrikstad, a son of Otto Marquard Orning Nilsen and Sara Lorentzen. He married Sophie Munch Roede in 1958. Their daughter Grethe Nilsen was married to politician Knut Frydenlund. He died in Oslo on 6 March 1957.

== Career ==
First trained as a mechanical engineer, Nilsen started his theatrical career as an actor. He worked as a stage actor in Bergen, Trondheim and Oslo. He was appointed theatre director at Det Norske Teatret from 1933 to 1934, and was theatre director at Den Nationale Scene from 1934 to 1939. His film debut was in Syndere i sommersol from 1934, and he also played in To levende og en død from 1937. In 1935, Nilsen had directed the premier of the play of Vår ære og vår makt ("Our Honor and Our Power") by Marxist writer Nordahl Grieg. The performance created considerable interest and controversy due to its socially critical content. It proved to be a financial success partly because of Nilsen's advanced directing and set design. During the Occupation of Norway by Nazi Germany, Nilsson had to flee to Sweden. While in Sweden, he was a co-founder of Fri norsk scene. From 1946 to 1950 he was again appointed theatre director at Det Norske Teatret. Together with Sigval Maartmann-Moe, he co-directed the film Dei svarte hestane from 1951, based on Tarjei Vesaas's novel with the same title. From 1952 he was theatre director of Folketeatret.

== Selected filmography ==
- Sinners in Summertime (1934)
- To levende og en død (1937)
- Dei svarte hestane (1951)

== Other sources ==
- Næss, Trine (1994) Mellomkrigstidens teater i den norske hovedstaden (Solum) ISBN 978-82-560-0947-3
- Nilsen, Sidsel Marie (1997) Helst mot urolig vær: Teatermannen Hans Jacob Nilsen (Oslo: Aschehoug) ISBN 978-82-03-22229-0

Cultural offices
Preceded by Ingjald Haaland	Director of the Det Norske Teatret; 1933–1934	Succeeded by Oskar Braaten
Preceded by Karl Bergmann	Director of the Den Nationale Scene; 1934–1939	Succeeded by Egil Hjorth-Jenssen
Preceded by	Director of the Det Norske Teatret; 1946–1950	Succeeded by Ole Barman
