= Folketeateret, Oslo =

Theatre in Oslo, Norway

Coordinates: 59°54′51″N 10°45′02″E

Folketeateret
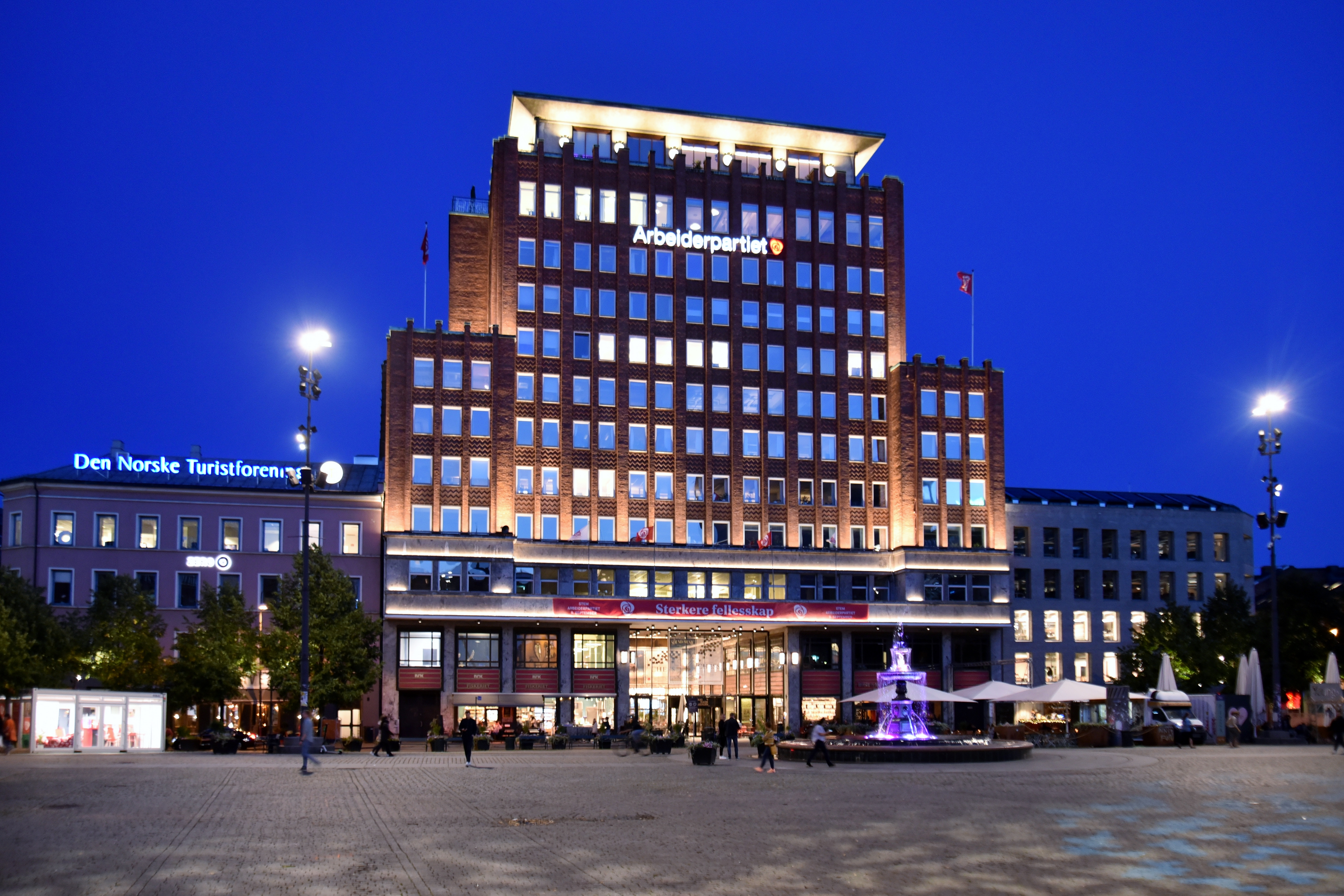
- Main entrance
- Interactive map of Folketeateret
- Address: Youngstorget; Oslo; Norway
- Capacity: 1,400

Construction
- Years active: 1935–present (the actual building); 1952–1959 (the theatre Folketeatret)
- Architects: Christian Morgenstierne; Arne Eide

Folketeateret is a theatre in Oslo, Norway. The building has been used as a movie theatre and as an opera house. The theatre has 1,400 seats.

== History ==
The theatre itself operated from 1952 to 1959, but the institution has a much longer history. Inspired by the Freie Deutsche Volksbühne in Berlin led to forming of interest organizations in Bergen and Oslo in 1928 and 1929. The idea to establish a good theater for the working class. The Folketeatret building in Oslo was commissioned in 1929, and the architects Christian Morgenstierne (1880–1967) and Arne Eide (1881–1957) worked on it until it opened in 1935. For financial reasons, a theatre did not open immediately, but a movie theatre was operated.

The first theatre performance happened in 1952. Hans Jacob Nilsen (1897–1957) was the theatre director from 1952 to 1955, then Jens Gunderssen (1912–1969) from 1955 to 1959. In 1959 the finances were too poor to continue as an independent theatre. Folketeatret was merged with Det Nye Teater to form Oslo Nye Teater, although it continued operation in Folketeatret's building. From 1959 to 2008 the building was shared with the Norwegian National Opera.

Stage production company Scenekvelder has been active to theater productions at the theatre in recent years. In 2013, Scenekvelder put up the production of the musical Annie. In 2014, Scenekvelder produces the first production of Billy Elliot The Musical at Folketeateret. In 2015, Scenekvelder produces the replica version of Mary Poppins. In 2016, Scenekvelder set up the production of Singin' in the Rain. In 2017, Scenekvelder set up the production of Les Misérables. In the fall of 2018, Scenekvelder set up the production of The Phantom of the Opera, directed by Stephen Barlow.
