= Alfred Solaas =

Norwegian actor

- Born: April 15, 1912; Christiania (now Oslo), Norway
- Died: November 23, 1968 (aged 56); Oslo, Norway
- Occupation: Actor
- Years active: 1934–1968

Alfred Solaas (April 15, 1912 – November 23, 1968) was a Norwegian actor, film director, and theater director. He was engaged for many years at the Oslo New Theater.

== Career ==
Solaas debuted in 1934 at the Carl Johan Theater. After that, he was engaged with the Central Theater from 1935 to 1939 and with the Oslo New Theater from 1940 to 1960, followed by freelance work. At the Central Theater his appearances included roles in The Threepenny Opera (Norwegian title: Tolvskillingsoperaen) in 1938 and in Finn Bo's revue Takk for sist (Nice to See You Again), and he received praise for his role as Arv in Ludvig Holberg's Jean de France. He made his debut as a director in 1946 and staged Shakespeare plays such as Hamlet, A Midsummer Night's Dream, and As You Like It. He also staged Henrik Ibsen's Peer Gynt and musicals such as My Fair Lady. He launched the Summer Theater in Frogner Park in 1953 and led it until his death in 1968.

Solaas also had several supporting roles in Norwegian films. He made his film debut here in 1937 with a small supporting role in Gyda Christensen and Tancred Ibsen's crime comedy To levende og en død. In addition, he appeared in films such as Trysil-Knut (1942), Om kjærlighet synger de (1946), Hans Nielsen Hauge (1961), Tonny (1962), and De ukjentes marked (1968). He also had some appearances on NRK's Television Theater.

In 1949, he directed the 39-minute short film Aldri mer!

== Filmography ==
=== Film actor ===
- 1937: To levende og en død as a guest at the hostel
- 1939: Familien på Borgan as Erik Nelson
- 1939: Hu Dagmar as Olaf, a servant at the Råvangen farm
- 1942: Det æ'kke te å tru as the master of ceremonies
- 1942: Trysil-Knut as the bailiff's servant
- 1946: Om kjærligheten synger de as Potten
- 1948: Den hemmelighetsfulle leiligheten as a gentleman
- 1953: Skøytekongen
- 1961: Hans Nielsen Hauge as Urdahl the parish priest in Tune
- 1962: Tonny
- 1963: Freske fraspark
- 1968: De ukjentes marked

=== Film director ===
- 1949: Aldri mer! (short film)

=== Television actor ===
- 1963: Læraren
- 1966: Nederlaget as Brigeau
