= Ella Hval =

Norwegian actress (1904–1994)

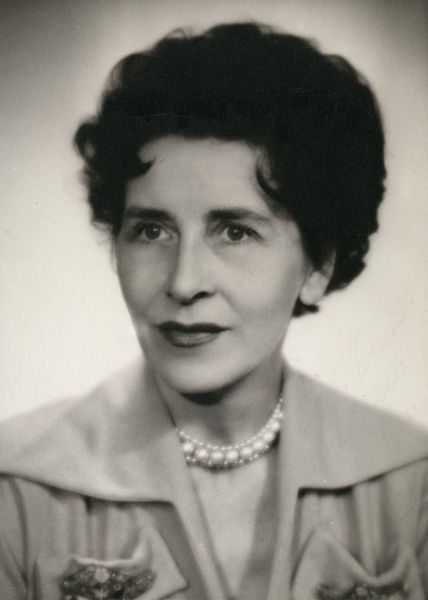
- Ella Hval
- Born: Ella Signe Quist Kristoffersen; 7 January 1904; Kristiania, Norway
- Died: 17 December 1994 (aged 90); Stavanger
- Occupations: Actress, instructor, teacher

Ella Hval (born Ella Signe Quist Kristoffersen) (7 January 1904 – 17 December 1994) was a Norwegian actress. She was principally a stage actress and was also an instructor and teacher at the Nationaltheatret student school.

== Personal life ==
Ella was born in Kristiania (now Oslo), Norway. She was a daughter of Kristoffer Kristoffersen and Anne Marie Quist. In her younger days she was active within the labour movement, where she took part in the entertainment by playing amateur theatre. Here she met the poet Rudolf William Nilsen (1901–29), and they got married in 1924. In 1929, Nilsen died of tuberculosis after only five years of marriage. In 1932 she remarried to physician Einar Hval (1901–1958).

== Career ==
She started acting professionally in 1932, when she appeared at the Oslo revue theater Chat Noir. At Søilen Teater in Oslo in 1932 she played the character "Anna" in the play Flammen (German: Die Sterne) by Hans Müller-Einigen (1882-1950). Her breakthrough was with the character "Vibeke" in Oppbrudd by Helge Krog (1898-1962) at Den Nationale Scene in Bergen in 1936–1937. Among her roles in Bergen were the characters "Gina" in Ibsen's play The Wild Duck, and "Rebekka" in Rosmersholm. She worked for this theatre until 1940.

From 1945 she worked for Nationaltheatret in Oslo, and played leading roles in plays such as Sartre's No Exit and Wiers-Jenssen's Anne Pedersdotter. She appeared as guest star in various theatres, including Radioteatret, where she played more than one hundred roles. For her radio appearances she was awarded the prize Blå Fugl in 1986. She made her film début in 1949 in Arne Skouen's Gategutter. Among her other films were Ut av mørket from 1958 and Over grensen from 1987. She chaired the Norwegian Actors' Equity Association for two periods, from 1951 to 1961 and from 1965 to 1967, and was given Honorary Membership in 1957.

She received the Arts Council Norway Honorary Award (Norsk kulturråds ærespris) in 1977. She was decorated Knight, First Class of the Royal Norwegian Order of St. Olav in 1974 and received the King's Medal of Merit (Kongens fortjenstmedalje) in gold. She was also Knight of the Order of the Falcon. She wrote a memoir book, Jeg har alltid hatt vanskelig for å glemme in 1979.

She died in Stavanger in 1994 and was buried at Vestre gravlund in Oslo.

Awards
Preceded by Sigbjørn Bernhoft Osa	Recipient of the Norsk kulturråds ærespris 1977	Succeeded by Olav Dalgard
