= Egil Hjorth-Jenssen =

Norwegian actor and theatre director

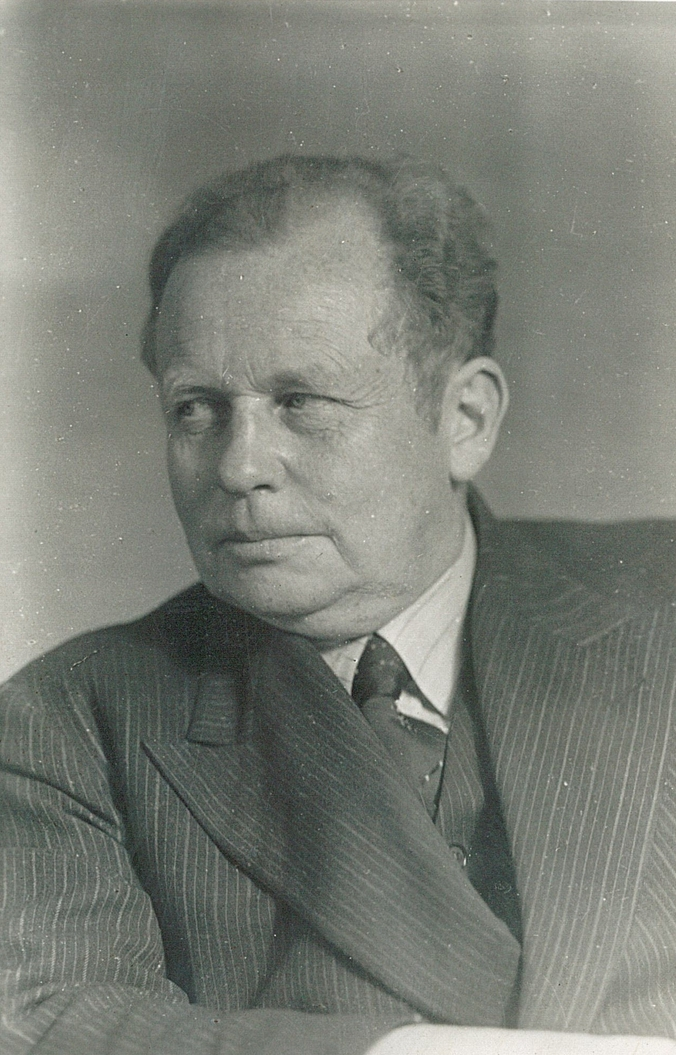
- Egil Hjorth-Jenssen ca 1950
- Born: 18 April 1893; Fredrikshald, United Kingdoms of Sweden and Norway
- Died: 8 November 1969 (aged 76); Bærum, Norway
- Occupations: Actor; Theatre director Children's writer Playwright; Translator

Egil Hjorth-Jenssen (18 April 1893 – 8 November 1969) was a Norwegian actor and theatre director, playwright, children's writer and translator.

== Personal life ==
Hjorth-Jenssen was born in Fredrikshald as a son of editor Gunnar Olaves Jenssen (1843–1924) and Anna Marie Cecilie Hjorth (1867–1929), and married Rachel Råby (1900–1958) in 1921.

== Career ==
He made his stage debut in 1914 at Stavanger Teater, From 1916 to 1919 he worked at Trondhjems Teater, then Chat Noir from 1919 to 1921 and Trondhjems Teater from 1921 to 1925. He later played at several Oslo theatres (Centralteatret, Det Nye Teater, Søilen Teater, and Carl Johan Theater), including at Nationaltheatret from 1934 to 1937. He chaired the Norwegian Actors' Equity Association from 1932 to 1939, and served as theatre director of Den Nationale Scene in Bergen from 1939 to 1946. From 1948 to 1950 he was the artistic director of Det Gamle Teater.

Hjorth-Jenssen was also a screen actor in movies such as: Den glade enke i Trangvik (1927), Bussen (1961), Musikanter (1967), De ukjentes marked (1968), and Brent jord (1969). He also wrote children's books—Fire fra middelskolen (1932) and Bilbandittene og de fire fra middelskolen (1933)—and two plays. He translated books to Norwegian such as The Adventures of Tom Sawyer and The Adventures of Huck Finn. He penned the fifty-year history of the Norwegian Actors' Equity Association in 1948, and became an honorary member in 1964. He died in November 1969 in Bærum.

Cultural offices
Preceded by Einar Sissener	Chairman of the Norwegian Actors' Equity Association; 1932–1939	Succeeded by David Knudsen
Preceded by Hans Jacob Nilsen	Director of the Den Nationale Scene; 1939–1946	Succeeded by Stein Bugge
