= Pelle Christensen =

Norwegian actor and translator (1923–1995)

Per "Pelle" Christensen (9 March 1923 – 30 July 1995) was a Norwegian actor and translator.

He was born in Kristiania as a son of Gerda Ring and Halfdan Christensen and brother of Bab Christensen. He made his stage debut in 1949 at the National Theatre. He worked here until 1958, then at Rogaland Teater from 1958 and Den Nationale Scene from 1962.

He also translated books, especially from French; writers such as Paul Éluard, Michel Tournier and Paul Valéry. From 1988 he was a member of the Norwegian Language Council, representing the Norwegian Actors' Equity Association.
