= Barbra Ring =

Norwegian writer (1870–1955)

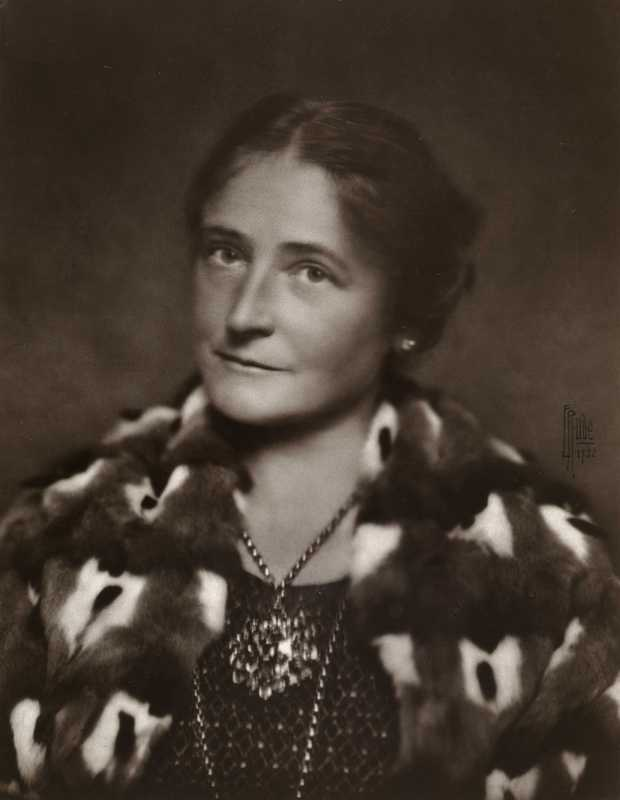
- Barbra Ring in 1922
- Born: Barbra Mathilde Ring; 4 July 1870; Drammen, Norway
- Died: 6 May 1955 (aged 84)
- Occupations: Novelist; short story writer; children's writer; biographer; literary critic; theatre critic
- Children: Gerda Ring
- Relatives: Hanna Winsnes (great-grandmother); Bab Christensen (granddaughter); Pelle Christensen (grandson)

Barbra Mathilde Ring (4 July 1870 – 6 May 1955) was a Norwegian novelist, short story writer, children's writer, biographer, memoirist, literary critic and theatre critic. She made her literary début in 1904 with the girl's novel Babbens Dagbog. Her children's books about "Peik" and other characters achieved great popularity. Her first novel for adults was Jomfruen, published in 1914.

Ring is probably best remembered for her children's books. Her folkloric story "Itte no knussel" (from the story collection Fnugg) is also characterized as a little pearl, and her novel Eldjarstad is named as her best work in this genre.

== Personal life ==
Ring was born in Drammen to judge Ole Ring and Thora Augusta Ravn. She was the great-granddaughter of Hanna Winsnes. She married wholesaler Thorvald Kirsebom in 1890, and they had the daughter Gerda Ring in 1891. The couple divorced in 1902. In 1917 she married colonel Ragnar Rosenquist.

== Selected works ==
- Babbens Dagbog, 1904
- Tertit, 1905
- Lillefru Tertit, 1906
- Vildbasser, 1906 (short stories)
- Tvillinger og andre barn, 1907 (short stories)
- Anne Karine Corvin, 1907
- Fjeldmus paa utenlands-reise, 1908
- To Aar efter, 1908
- Fnugg, 1909 (short stories)
- Riebes paa Star, 1910
- Da Peik skulde gjøre sin Lykke, 1910
- Peik, 1911
- Billet mrk. "286". En Fortælling om en ung Pige, 1911
- Fra Hanna Winsnes' Prestegaard, 1911
- Den rette, 1912
- Den kjærligheten, 1913 (short stories)
- Rædharen, 1913
- Jomfruen, 1914 (novel)
- Før kulden kommer, 1915
- Under seil, 1916
- Veien, 1917
- Vildbasser og andre Fortællinger. Rædharen, 1919
- Guldkappen, 1919
- To, 1920
- Mennesket Fernanda Nissen, 1921 (biography of Fernanda Nissen)
- Kredsen, 1921
- Kongens hjerte, 1922 (children's comedy, staged at Nationaltheatret)
- Søstre, 1922
- En mand, 1923
- For hundrede Aar siden. Hanna Winsnes og Hendes., 1924 (biography)
- Unge fruer, 1924
- Vi fraskilte barn. Ved et av dem, 1924
- Vi som vandrer, 1926
- Kvinde, 1927
- Lille-Mette, 1928
- Dengang da jeg var pige, 1928 (memoirs)
- Minder og små bekjendelser, 1929 (memoirs)
- Nu, 1930
- Eldjarstad, 1931
- Et år gikk rundt, 1932
- Elven strømmer, 1933
- Chansen, 1934
- Jolle, 1934
- Leken på Ladeby, 1936
- Leken blir liv, 1937
- Marcus Gjøgs medaljong, 1938
- Farlig start, 1939
- Sånn er Norge, 1940
- Mellom venner og fiender, 1947 (memoirs)

== Bibliography ==
- Hagemann, Sonja (1974). Barnelitteratur i Norge 1850–1914 (in Norwegian). Aschehoug. pp. 197–207. ISBN 82-03-03868-9.
- Winsnes, A.H. (1961). Norges Litteratur fra 1880–årene til første verdenskrig (in Norwegian). Aschehoug. pp. 586–588.
- Amdam, Per (1975). "En ny realisme. Historie og samtid". In Beyer, Edvard (ed.). Norges Litteraturhistorie (in Norwegian). Vol. 4. Oslo: Cappelen. pp. 399–400.
