= Sven Henning =

Norwegian actor and director (1940–2026)

- Born: 18 September 1940; Trondheim, Norway
- Died: 31 May 2026 (aged 85); Oslo, Norway
- Occupations: Theatre director, theatre instructor
- Years active: 1966–2026
- Employer(s): Trøndelag Teater; Den Nationale Scene; Norwegian National Academy of Theatre; Concerts Norway
- Known for: Director of the Den Nationale Scene; Director of the Bergen International Festival

Sven Henning (18 September 1940 – 31 May 2026) was a Norwegian theatre instructor and director.

He was born in Trondheim, and started his instructor career at Trøndelag Teater from 1966 to 1969. He moved on to instruct at Den Nationale Scene from 1971 to 1972, and was then director of the Bergen International Festival and Bergen Philharmonic Orchestra from 1972 to 1976. From 1976 to 1982, he was the director of Den Nationale Scene. He later worked at the Norwegian National Academy of Theatre and Concerts Norway.

Henning died in Oslo on 31 May 2026, at the age of 85.

Cultural offices
Preceded by Knut Thomassen	Director of the Den Nationale Scene; 1976–1982	Succeeded by Kjetil Bang-Hansen
