= Hanna Winsnes =

Norwegian poet, novelist and cookbook writer

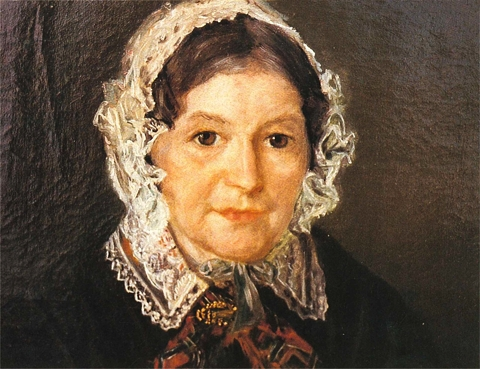
- Hanna Winsnes, portrayed by Mathias Stoltenberg
- Born: Hanna Olava Strøm; 29 August 1789; Bragernes, Drammen, Norway
- Died: 19 October 1872 (aged 83)
- Occupations: Poet, novelist, non-fiction writer
- Known for: Being the first female novelist in Norway
- Notable work: Grevens Datter (novel, 1841); Lærebog i de forskjellige Grene af Huusholdningen (cookbook, 1845)
- Spouse: Paul Winsnes
- Relatives: Hans Strøm (uncle); Barbra Ring (great-granddaughter)

Hanna Olava Winsnes (née Strøm; 29 August 1789 – 19 October 1872) was a Norwegian poet, novelist and cookbook writer.

She was born in the Bragernes neighborhood of Drammen in Buskerud, Norway. She was the daughter of Jens Henrich Strøm (1729–1809) and Karen Tyrholm Plathe (1755–1805). She was married to parish priest and member of Parliament, Paul Winsnes (1794–1889). She was the great-grandmother of Norwegian novelist, Barbra Ring.

Hanna Winsnes was the first female novelist in Norway. Her first publication was Grevens Datter from 1841, published under the pseudonym "Hugo Schwarz". She followed with the children's book Aftnerne paa Egelund (1852). She is particularly remembered for her cookbook, Lærebog i de forskjellige Grene af Huusholdningen (Guide to the Various Branches of Housekeeping) from 1845, which also included themes such as livestock farming, butchering, baking, boiling of soap, and candlemoulding. The book also contains many recipes, both for meals as well as pastry cooking and baking. The book has come out in fourteen editions.

== See also ==
- Cajsa Warg, Sweden's "Hanna Winsnes"
