= Ludvig Bergh =

Norwegian military officer, singer, actor and theatre director (1865–1924)

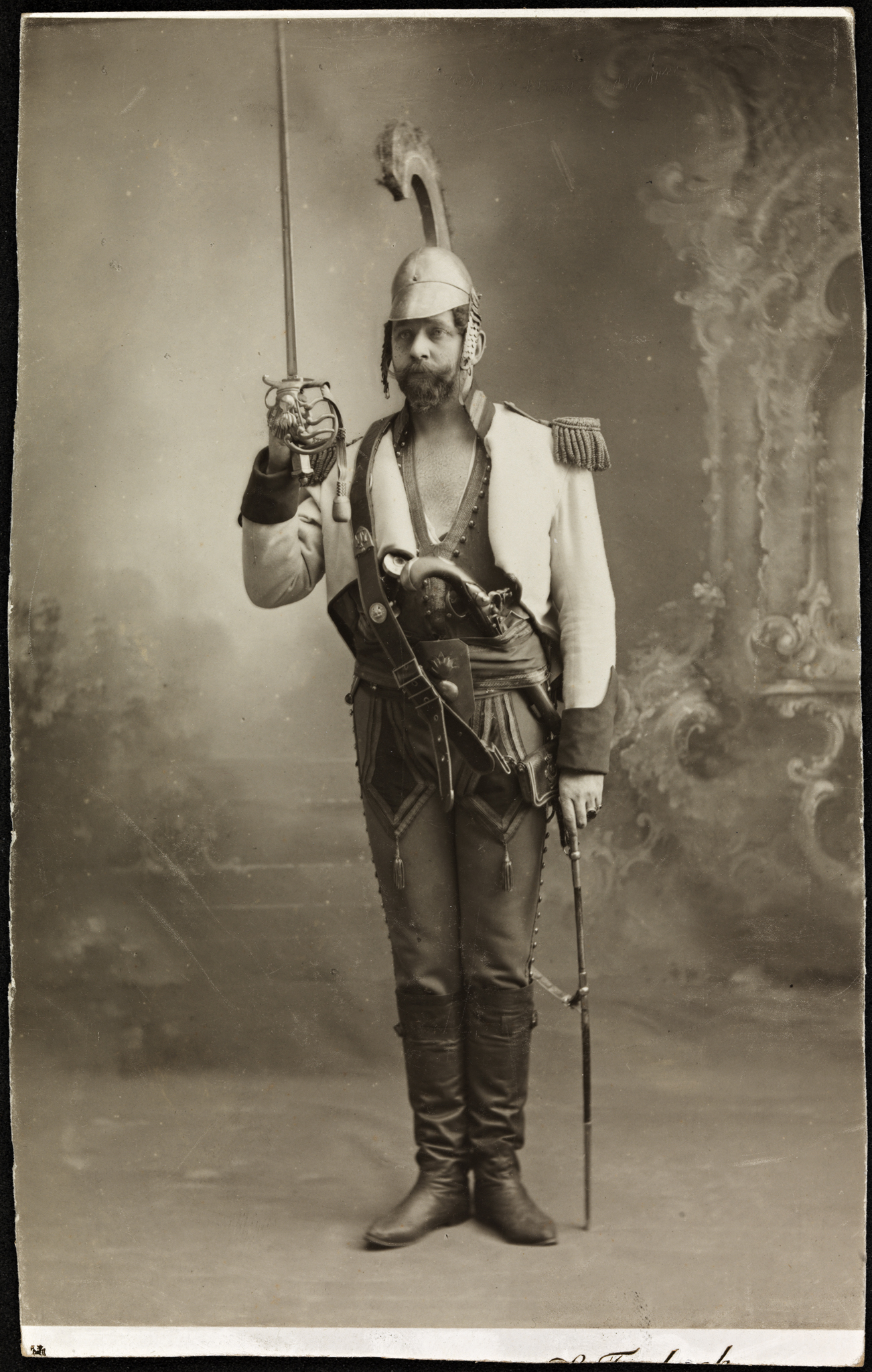
- Born: 9 January 1865; Christiania, Norway
- Died: 22 October 1924 (aged 59); Kristiania, Norway
- Occupations: Singer; Actor; Theatre director

Ludvig Bergh (9 January 1865 – 22 October 1924) was a Norwegian military officer, singer, actor and theatre director. He made his concert debut in Copenhagen in 1890. He worked as an actor in Christiania at the Carl Johan Theater, Christiania Theater, and from 1898 to 1908 at Nationaltheatret. He was chairman of the Norwegian Actors' Equity Association from 1903 to 1904. He was theatre director of the Bergen theatre Den Nationale Scene from 1909 to 1924.

Cultural offices
| Preceded by Olaf Mørch Hansson | Director of Den Nationale Scene; 1909–1924 | Succeeded by Christian Sandal |
