= Karl Bergmann (actor) =

Norwegian actor and theatre director

- Born: 15 November 1882; Bergen, Norway
- Died: 16 June 1964 (aged 81); Bergen, Norway
- Occupations: Actor and theatre director

Karl Bergmann (15 November 1882 – 16 June 1964) was a Norwegian actor and theatre director. He made his stage debut in 1901 at Den Nationale Scene in Bergen. He served as theatre director of Den Nationale Scene from 1931 to 1934.

== Personal life ==
Bergmann was born in Bergen on 15 November 1882, a son of hairdresser Carl Pedersen and Alida Bergmann. In 1906 he married actress Lilly Catharina Thomsen.

Cultural offices
Preceded by Thomas Thomassen	Director of the Den Nationale Scene; 1931–1934	Succeeded by Hans Jacob Nilsen
