= Halfdan Christensen =

Norwegian actor and theatre director

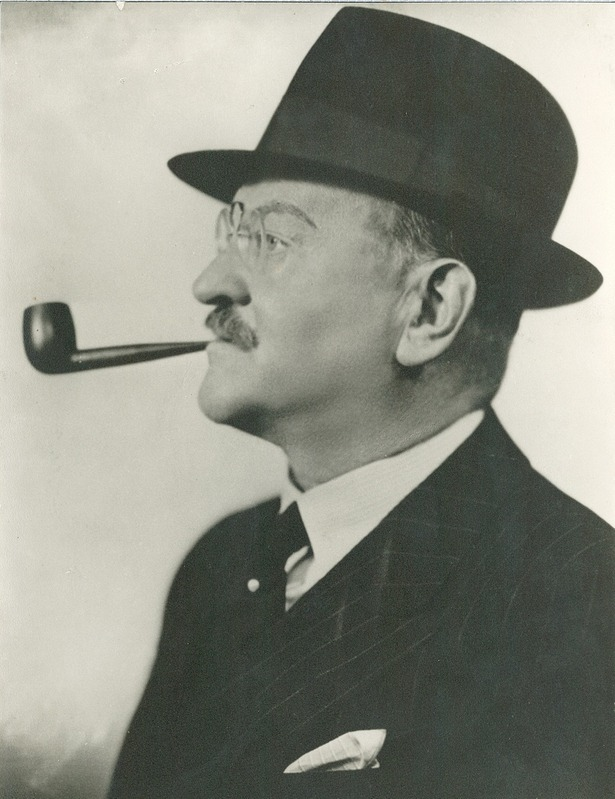
- Halfdan Christensen (ca. 1940)
- Born: 12 December 1873; Porsgrunn, Norway
- Died: 17 September 1950 (aged 76); Oslo, Norway
- Resting place: Oslo Western Civil Cemetery
- Occupations: Actor and theatre director
- Spouses: Agnes Elisabeth Simonsen (m. 1896) Gyda Christensen (m. 1905) Gerda Ring (m. 1922)
- Children: Pelle Christensen; Bab Christensen
- Awards: Order of St. Olav; Order of Dannebrog; Order of Vasa

Halfdan Christensen (12 December 1873 – 17 September 1950) was a Norwegian stage actor and theatre director.

== Biography ==
Christensen was born at Porsgrunn in Telemark, Norway. His family moved to Kristiania (now Oslo) where he attended Aars og Voss skole and later attended Kristiania Handelsgymnasium. In 1894, he conducted a study trip to Denmark and Germany. He had his stage début at Den Nationale Scene in Bergen during 1896.

He was among the leading actors at the National Theatre from its opening in 1899. In 1907, Christensen began to act as stage director. He was theatre director from 1911 to 1923, and again from 1930 to 1933. During the Second World War he had to flee to Sweden, and there he led the theatre Fri norsk scene together with his wife Gerda Ring. After returning to Norway after the liberation in 1945, he had held various positions at the National Theater. During the 1920s and 1930s, he had written three plays, all of which were performed at the National Theater, with Christensen as stage director.

Christensen was appointed Commander of the Royal Norwegian Order of St. Olav in 1932, he was Commander of the Danish Order of the Dannebrog, and Commander of the Swedish Order of Vasa. He was married three times, first in 1896 to Agnes Elisabeth Simonsen, second in 1905 to actress Gyda Christensen (1872–1964), and in 1922 to actress Gerda Ring (1891–1999). He was the father of Pelle Christensen (1923–1995) and Bab Christensen (1928–2017) both of whom were stage actors.

Cultural offices
Preceded by Vilhelm Krag	Director of the National Theatre; 1911–1923	Succeeded by Bjørn Bjørnson
Preceded by Einar Skavlan	Director of the National Theatre; 1930–1933	Succeeded by Anton Rønneberg (acting)
