= Bab Christensen =

Norwegian actress (1928–2017)

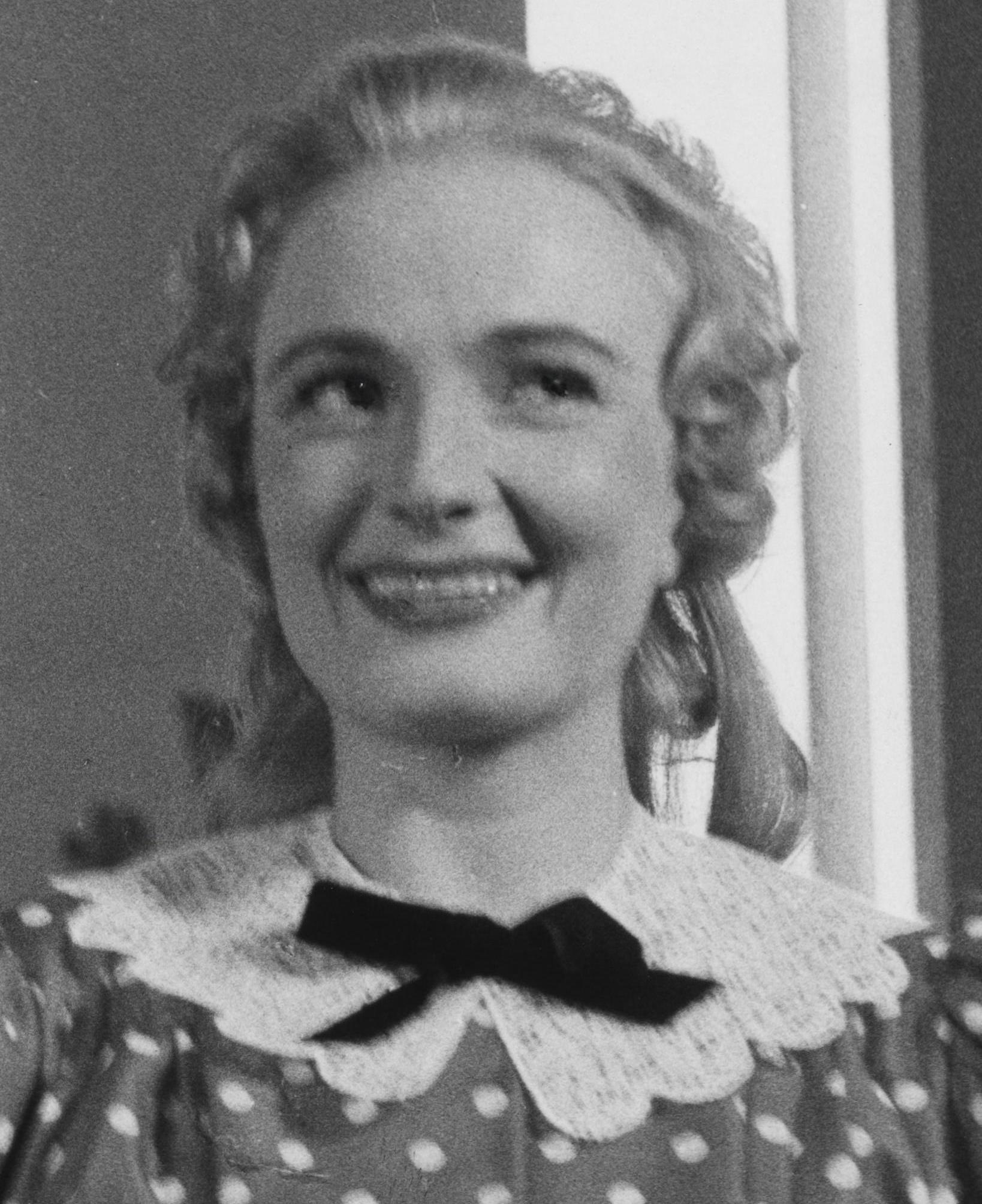
- Born: Barbra Karine Christensen; 8 January 1928; Kristiania, Norway
- Died: 10 April 2017 (aged 89); Oslo, Norway
- Occupation: Actress
- Spouse: Lasse Kolstad (m. 1957; died 2012)

Barbra Karine "Bab" Christensen (8 January 1928 – 10 April 2017) was a Norwegian actress.

She was born in Kristiania as a daughter of actors Gerda Ring and Halfdan Christensen and younger sister of actor Pelle Christensen. She made her stage debut in 1947 at the National Theatre, and was employed at Den Nationale Scene from 1949, the National Theatre from 1952, Trøndelag Teater from 1963, Fjernsynsteatret from and Det Norske Teatret from 1970. She appeared in a small number of films.

She was married to Lasse Kolstad (1922–2012). She was a sister-in-law of Henki Kolstad and Knut Kolstad.

Christensen died on 10 April 2017 in Oslo, aged 89.

== Selected filmography ==
- Stevnemøte med glemte år (1957)
