= Bjarne Andersen =

Norwegian actor and theatre director

- Born: 15 January 1909; Stavanger, Norway
- Died: 13 August 1982 (aged 73)
- Occupation: Actor
- Awards: Norwegian Theatre Critics Award (1971/72)

Bjarne Andersen (15 January 1909 – 13 August 1982) was a Norwegian actor, stage producer and theatre director.

== Personal life ==
Andersen was born in Stavanger on 15 January 1909, to Emil Laurentzius Andersen and Ingeborg Bertine Osmondsdatter Udvig. He married librarian Sissel Aanderaa in 1957.

== Career ==
Andersen worked for Det Norske Teatret from 1944 to 1951. He served as theatre director at Rogaland Teater from 1958 to 1960, and at Den Nationale Scene from 1961 to 1963. He was chairman for the Norwegian Actors' Equity Association from 1967 to 1969.

He made his film debut in Tancred Ibsens To mistenkelige personer (1950). Among his film roles was the one as Stråmannen (Straw Man) in Arne Skouens Emergency Landing (1952). He also portrayed Paul Cox's sidekick, taxi driver Richardson, in the popular radio plays series God aften, mitt navn er Cox (Good Evening, My Name is Cox).

Andersen directed Norway's first feature film in color, Smuglere i smoking (1957). He also wrote the screenplays for Roser til Monica (1956, also director) and Heksenetter (1954).

Cultural offices
Preceded by Gisle Straume	Director of the Rogaland Teater; 1958–1960	Succeeded by Bjørn Endreson
Preceded by Per Schwab	Director of the Den Nationale Scene; 1961–1963	Succeeded by Gisle Straume
