= Bjarte Hjelmeland =

Norwegian actor and director

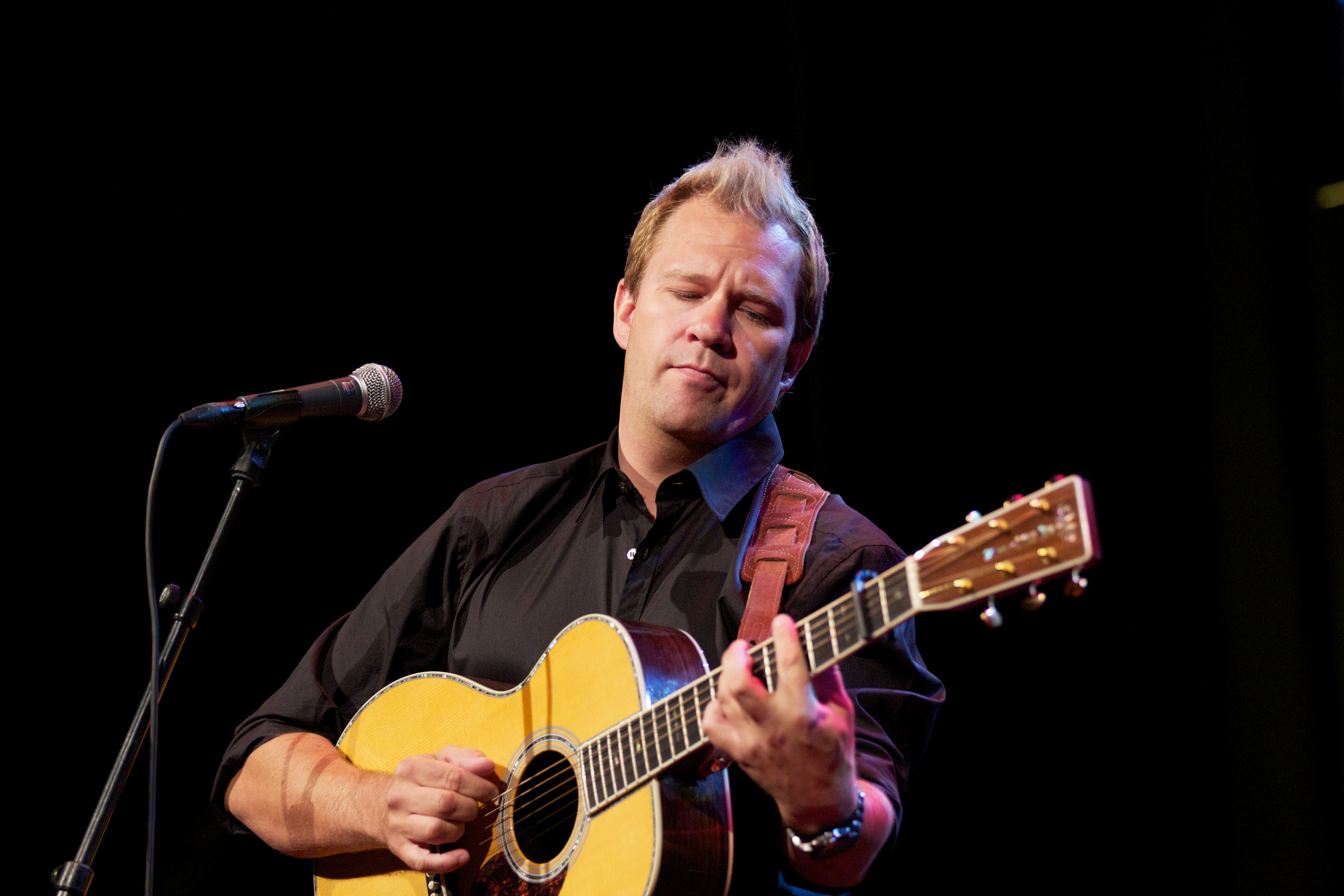
- Bjarte Hjelmeland in 2010
- Born: 24 February 1970 (age 56); Bergen, Norway
- Occupations: Actor and director

Bjarte Hjelmeland (born 24 February 1970) is a Norwegian actor and theatre director. He was born in Bergen. He made his stage debut in 1991 at Oslo Nye Teater, and also had notable roles at the National Theatre, Rogaland Teater, Torshovteatret, Den Nationale Scene and Chateau Neuf. In 2008 he was hired as director of Den Nationale Scene.

Films include his screen debut Byttinger (1991), Livredd (1997) and Desperate bekjennelser (1998). Television series include Vestavind (1994–1995), the talk show Mandagsklubben (1996–1997) and Hvaler. He was a judge on Series 6 of Norske Talenter. He has also released music albums.

Hjelmeland is openly gay.

Cultural offices
Preceded by Morten Borgersen	Director of the Den Nationale Scene; 2008–present	Incumbent
