= Christian Sandal =

Norwegian actor and theatre director

Christian Sandal (12 October 1872 – 17 May 1951) was a Norwegian actor and theatre director.

He made his debut at Den Nationale Scene in 1894, and was the director of that theatre from 1924 to 1925. In 1898 he was a co-founder of the trade union Norwegian Actors' Equity Association; he was also the first secretary. In 1943 he received honorary membership. He died in May 1951.

Cultural offices
Preceded by Ludvig Bergh	Director of Den Nationale Scene; 1924–1925	Succeeded by Thomas Thomassen
