= Gisle Straume =

Norwegian actor and theatre director

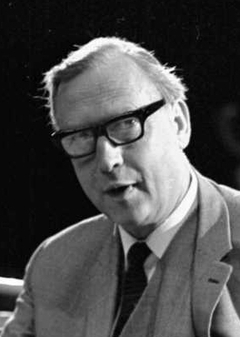
- Gisle Straume in 1967
- Born: 26 August 1917; Holla Municipality, Norway
- Died: 1 December 1988 (aged 71)
- Occupations: Actor; Theatre director

Gisle Straume (26 August 1917 – 1 December 1988) was a Norwegian actor and theatre director.

== Personal life ==
Straume was born in Holla Municipality, the son of farmer and headmaster Eivind Straume and teacher Brita Monsine Skanke Aarnes. He married actress Julia Back in 1948. This marriage was later dissolved, and in 1963 he married journalist and actress Sonja Cora Christensen.

== Career ==
He was employed at Det Norske Teatret from 1945 to 1951, at Den Nationale Scene from 1951 to 1952, and again at Det Norske Teatret from 1952 to 1955. He served as theatre director at Rogaland Teater from 1956 to 1958, and for Den Nationale Scene from 1963 to 1967, and worked for the National Theatre in Oslo from 1959 to 1963 and from 1967 to 1976.

Straume was particularly popular for his role as "lektor Tørrdal" in Stompa (a Norwegian adaptation of the Jennings novels), a series of radio plays and films for children.

He was decorated Knight, First Class of the Order of St. Olav in 1983.

== External sources ==
- Gisle Straume at IMDb

Cultural offices
Preceded by Claes Gill	Director of the Rogaland Teater; 1956–1958	Succeeded by Bjarne Andersen
Preceded by Bjarne Andersen	Director of the Den Nationale Scene; 1963–1967	Succeeded by Knut Thomassen
