= Baardsen =

Baardsen or Bårdsen is a Norwegian surname. Notable people with the surname include:

- Arnfinn Bårdsen (born 1966), Norwegian judge
- Espen Baardsen (born 1977), American soccer player
- Gjest Baardsen (1791–1849), Norwegian outlaw and writer

== See also ==
- Baardson
