= Sigurd Christiansen =

Norwegian novelist and playwright

- Born: 17 November 1891; Drammen, Norway
- Died: 23 October 1947 (aged 55); Drammen, Norway
- Occupations: novelist and playwright
- Notable work: To levende og en død (1931)
- Awards: Gyldendal's Endowment (1940)

Sigurd Christiansen (17 November 1891 – 23 October 1947) was a Norwegian novelist and playwright. He made his literary debut with the novel Seieren in 1915.

His literary breakthrough was the trilogy Indgangen (1925), Sverdene (1927) and Riket (1929).

His novel To levende og en død (1931) won first prize in a competition, and was later made into three films: Norwegian, Czechoslovak and British-Swedish.

Christiansen was awarded Gyldendal's Endowment in 1940.

He was born and died in Drammen, Norway.

== Works ==
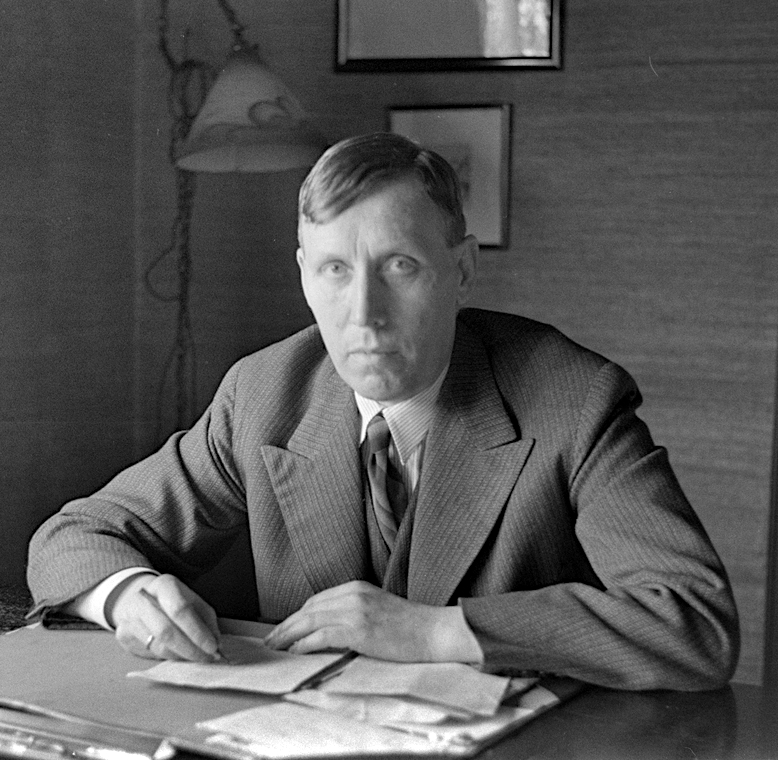
Sigurd Christiansen

- Seieren (1915)
- Thomas Hergel (1917)
- Vort eget liv (1918)
- Offerdøden : skuespil i fire akter (1919)
- Døperen (1921)
- Blodet (1923)
- Indgangen (1925)
- Edmund Jahr (1926)
- Sverdene (1927)
- Riket (1929)
- To levende og en død (1931)
- En reise i natten (1931)
- Dydens have (1932)
- Agner i stormen (1933)
- Drømmen og livet (1935) (trilogy Jørgen Wendt 1)
- Det ensomme hjerte (1938) (trilogy Jørgen Wendt 2)
- Mannen fra bensinstasjonen (1941)
- Menneskenes lodd (1945) (trilogy Jørgen Wendt 3)
