= Knut Jacobsen (actor) =

Norwegian actor

- Born: March 19, 1910; Moss, Norway
- Died: September 18, 1971 (aged 61)
- Occupation(s): Actor, costume designer

Knut Jacobsen (March 19, 1910 – September 18, 1971) was a Norwegian actor and costume designer.

As a student at the National Theater in Oslo, he studied with Egil Eide, and he took singing lessons with the well-known singing teacher Arne van Erpekum Sem and dance lessons with Inga Jacobi.

Jacobsen debuted in 1932 at the National Theater in Henrik Ibsen's play An Enemy of the People, which was staged as Egil Eide's anniversary performance. He then also worked at the Oslo New Theater and the Søilen Theater. After a few years in Oslo, he moved to Trondheim in 1937 and started performing at the Trøndelag Theater, where he quickly became one of the theatre's driving forces. For fifteen years he was the costume director at the Trøndelag Theater in addition to performing on stage as an actor and singer. Among Jacobsen's roles in plays by Ibsen were Doctor Wangel in The Lady from the Sea, Kroll in Rosmersholm, Stockmann in An Enemy of the People, and Manders in Ghosts. He also appeared in operettas and revues.

Jacobsen appeared in supporting roles in the films To levende og en død (1937) and Trysil-Knut (1942).

== Filmography ==
- 1937: To levende og en død as the doctor
- 1942: Trysil-Knut as an adjutant
