= Dei svarte hestane =

Novel by Tarjei Vesaas

first edition (publ. Aschehoug)

Dei svarte hestane (The Black Horses) is a 1928 novel by the Norwegian writer Tarjei Vesaas. It tells the story of a farm owner who devotes his life to his four horses, as his wife is unable to overcome an intense but failed romance she had in her youth. When the man of her affections appears at the farm, the family begins to fall apart.

== Adaptation ==
The novel was turned into the film Dei svarte hestane. It was directed by Hans Jacob Nilsen and premiered on 24 September 1951.
