= Stein Bugge =

Stein Bugge (26 September 1896 – 3 October 1961) was a Norwegian playwright, theatre theorist and theatre director. He was theatre director of the Bergen theatre Den Nationale Scene from 1946 to 1948.

== Selected works ==
- Det ideale teater (1928)
- Tragedien om Mengin (play, 1928)

Cultural offices
Preceded by Egil Hjorth-Jenssen	Director of the Den Nationale Scene; 1946–1948	Succeeded by Georg Løkkeberg
