= Knut Thomassen =

Norwegian actor

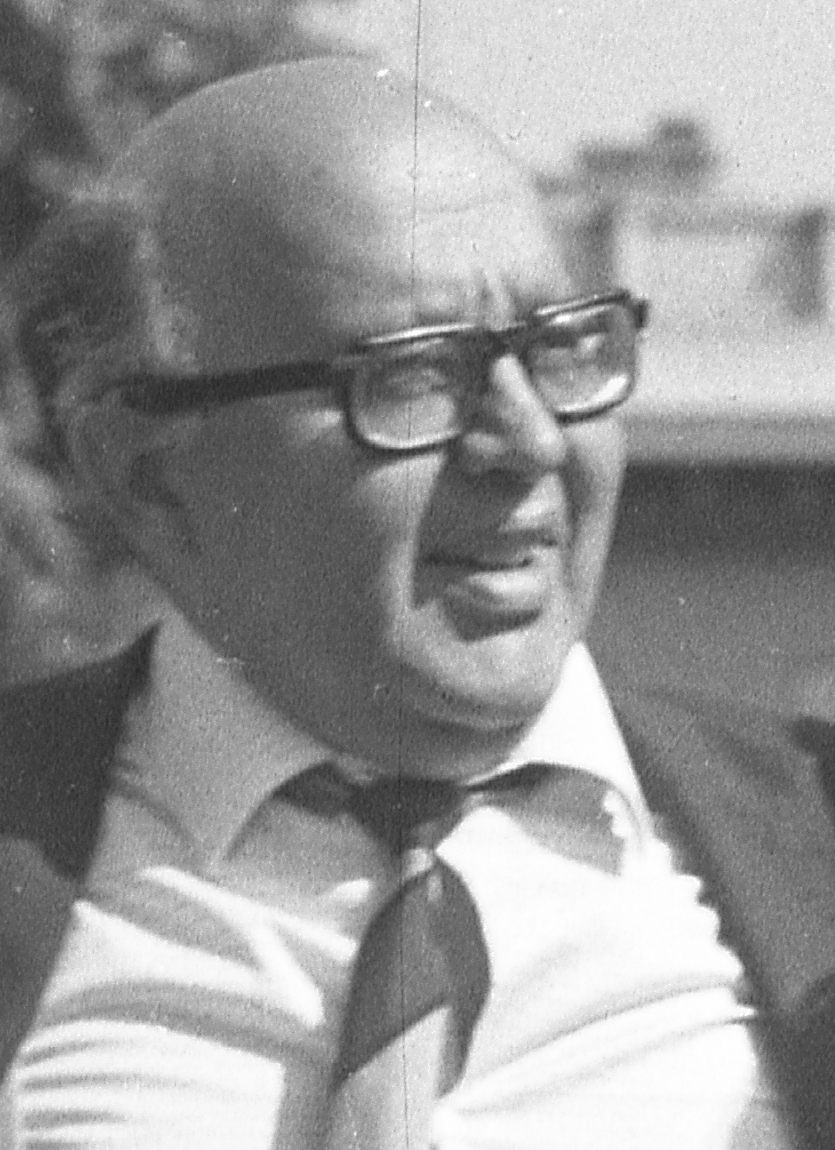
- photo by Eirik Sundvor, 1969
- Born: 17 July 1921; Stavanger, Norway
- Died: 20 January 2002 (aged 80)
- Occupation(s): Actor and theatre director
- Parent: Thomas Thomassen
- Awards: Order of St. Olav (1976); Hedda Honorary Award (1990)

Knut Thomassen (17 July 1921 – 20 January 2002) was a Norwegian actor and theatre director.

== Career ==
Thomassen made his stage debut at Det Nye Teater in Oslo in 1941. He served as theatre director of Den Nationale Scene from 1967 to 1976. He was an active participant in organizational work, and chaired National and Scandinavian theatre associations for many years. He was decorated Knight, First Class of the Royal Norwegian Order of St. Olav in 1976, and received the Hedda Honorary Award in 1990.

== Personal life ==
Thomassen was born in Stavanger on 17 July 1921.

Cultural offices
Preceded by Gisle Straume	Director of the Den Nationale Scene; 1967–1976	Succeeded by Sven Henning
