= Tonny =

1962 film

- Directed by: Nils R. Müller; Per Gjersøe
- Written by: Jens Bjørneboe; Sverre Gran
- Produced by: Sverre Gran
- Starring: Per Christensen
- Cinematography: Hans Nord
- Edited by: Olaf Engebretsen
- Release date: 22 January 1962
- Running time: 86 minutes
- Country: Norway
- Language: Norwegian

Tonny is a 1962 Norwegian drama film directed by Nils R. Müller and Per Gjersøe. It was entered into the 12th Berlin International Film Festival.

== Cast ==
- Per Christensen as Tonny
- Wenche Foss as Tonnys mor
- Liv Ullmann as Kari
- Joachim Calmeyer as Rørleggeren
- Rolf Daleng as Alfred
- Finn Kvalem as Rødtopp
- Ola B. Johannessen as Politimann
- Henny Skjønberg as Dame med parasoll
- Helga Backe
- Finn Bernhoft
- Erik Melbye Brekke
- Synnøve Gleditsch
- Rolf Nannestad
- Alfred Solaas
