= MS Ravnaas (1930) =

History

Norway
- Name: Ravnaas
- Owner: Agdesidens Rederi A/S
- Operator: Agdesidens Rederi / Nortraship
- Port of registry: (Norway) Arendal
- Builder: Eriksbergs Mekaniska Verkstads AB in Gothenburg, Sweden
- Launched: 27 October 1930
- Identification: Code letters: LJSN (1931–1934); LCOF (1934–1941)
- Fate: Sunk by Japanese aircraft east of Samar Island on 8 December 1941

General characteristics
- Type: Cargo ship
- Tonnage: 4,019 GRT; 6,850 DWT
- Length: 350.8 ft (106.9 m)
- Beam: 50.8 ft (15.5 m)
- Draught: 25.7 ft (7.8 m)

MS Ravnaas was a Norwegian cargo ship built in 1931, and sunk by Japanese aircraft in the Pacific Ocean in December 1941.

== Construction ==
The ship was built by Eriksbergs Mekaniska Verkstads AB in Gothenburg in 1931. She had a length of 107 metres, beam of 15.5 metres, draught of 7.8 metres, and a tonnage of 4,019 tons (6,850 dwt). She was a single deck, steel-hulled ship with oil engines, electric lights and wireless radio.

== Second World War ==
During the Second World War MS Ravnaas was sailing for Arnt J. Mørland's shipping company Agdesidens Rederi A/S and Nortraship. The ship's captain was Thomas Eilertsen. According to sailing lists archived at the National Archives of Norway, Ravnaas was located at Portland in Oregon, US, at the time of the German invasion of Norway in April 1940. She sailed from Seattle to Shanghai in April/May 1940, from Yokohama to Vancouver in June, then from Vancouver to Durban, where she arrived late August 1940. During 1941 she sailed on the Pacific Ocean, between Asia and America. On 28 November 1941 she departed Calcutta, heading for San Francisco.

=== Sinking, and fate of crew ===
In the morning of 8 December 1941, on its way from Calcutta to San Francisco, the ship was sunk by Japanese aircraft 250 nmi east of Samar Island, about the same time as the Japanese attack on Pearl Harbor. (Note: Hjeltnes cites the Nortraship maritime declaration, M/S Ravnaas from the National Archives of Norway, which dates the attack as Monday morning, 8 December 1941, while some survivors' stories date the attack to 7 December 1941. The attack on Pearl Harbor, east of the International Date Line, took place on 7 December 1941 local time. MS Ravnaas was sunk west of the International Date Line.) All 28 crew members escaped in lifeboats and after three days the boats reached the city of Surigao on the island of Mindanao, Philippines. Within the next few days the crew were brought to the city of Cebu on the Cebu Island. Two of the crew members, Brynjolv Baardson and Jens Kristian Jensen, volunteered to join the American army early in January 1942. After the Japanese invasion of the Cebu Island in April 1942, the crew members hid in the jungle, but in May 1942, 24 of the men surrendered and were interned in Japanese camps, such as the Santo Tomas Internment Camp in Manila, in Los Baños. Four of the men did not surrender, but kept hiding in the jungle, and eventually joined guerillas. Eight of the crew members were rescued after the Raid at Los Baños in 1945. Nineteen of the Ravnaas crew were transported with SS Simeon G. Reed to San Francisco, arriving there in May 1945. Baardson and Jensen were freed from the Roku Roshi POW Camp on Honshu after the Japanese surrender in August 1945, along with imprisoned American troops.

In 1981 Brynjolv Baardson published the memoir book Kiotskee! Norsk krigsfange i Japan, with his accounts of the bombing of MS Ravnaas, his service as Lieutenant in the American Army during the Japanese invasion of the Cebu Island, and later experiences in Japanese internment camps.
