= To levende og en død (novel) =

1931 novel by Sigurd Christiansen

- Author: Sigurd Christiansen
- Language: Norwegian
- Genre: Thriller novel
- Publication date: 1931
- Media type: Print

To levende og en død (lit. Two living and one dead) is a 1931 Norwegian novel written by Sigurd Christiansen. A post office worker, due for promotion, faces a crisis of conscience when his workplace is robbed.

== Adaptations ==
The novel has been turned into feature films on three occasions: a 1937 Norwegian film To levende og en død was made, directed by Gyda Christensen and Tancred Ibsen, a 1947 Czech film A Dead Man Among the Living directed by Bořivoj Zeman and a 1961 British-Swedish film Two Living, One Dead directed by Anthony Asquith.

== Bibliography ==
- Soila, Tytti & Söderbergh-Widding, Astrid & Iverson, Gunnar. Nordic National Cinemas. Routledge, 1998.
