= Dei svarte hestane (film) =

1951 Norwegian drama film

- Directed by: Hans Jacob Nilsen; Sigval Maartmann-Moe
- Screenplay by: Eiliv Odde Hauge; Kåre Bergstrøm
- Based on: Dei svarte hestane by Tarjei Vesaas
- Starring: Hans Jacob Nilsen; Eva Sletto
- Release date: 24 September 1951
- Running time: 85 minutes
- Country: Norway
- Language: Norwegian

Dei svarte hestane ('The Black Horses') is a 1951 Norwegian drama film directed by Hans Jacob Nilsen and Sigval Maartmann-Moe, and starring Hans Jacob Nilsen, Eva Sletto and Ottar Vicklund. It is based on the novel Dei svarte hestane by Tarjei Vesaas.

Ambros Fornes (Nilsen) owns two large farms and runs a coaching house. On his farm he has four fit and shiny black horses. These horses eventually become the centre of his life, because his young and beautiful wife, Lisle (Sletto), is unable to love him like he loves her. She cannot forget Bjørneskinn (Vicklund), the blond young man she was once in love with. He wanted to be a poet, but decided on a life on the road when he could not have her.

When the old boyfriend one day returns, it leads to a dramatic showdown. The family is about to fall apart, which will be particularly hard for Kjell, Ambros and Lisle's young son. He end up in a conflict of loyalty between his parents, and has great difficulties dealing with the situation.

== Cast ==
- Hans Jacob Nilsen as Ambros Førnes
- Eva Sletto as Lisle Førnes
- Olav Strandli as Kjell Førnes
- Mette Lange-Nielsen as Viv Førnes
- Claus Wiese as Rolv Gangstad
- Ottar Wicklund as Bjørnskinn
- Else-Merete Heiberg as Frida Nordbø
- Roy Bjørnstad as Falte
- Jens Bolling as Henrik Nordbø
- Lasse Kolstad as En bondegutt
- Eva Nilsen as Mabb Førnes
- Alf Ramsøy as Leiv Førnes
- Ingolf Rogde as Brankestad
- Espen Skjønberg as Ola Nordbø
- Liv Uchermann Selmer as Inger
