= Rudolf Nilsen =

Norwegian poet and journalist

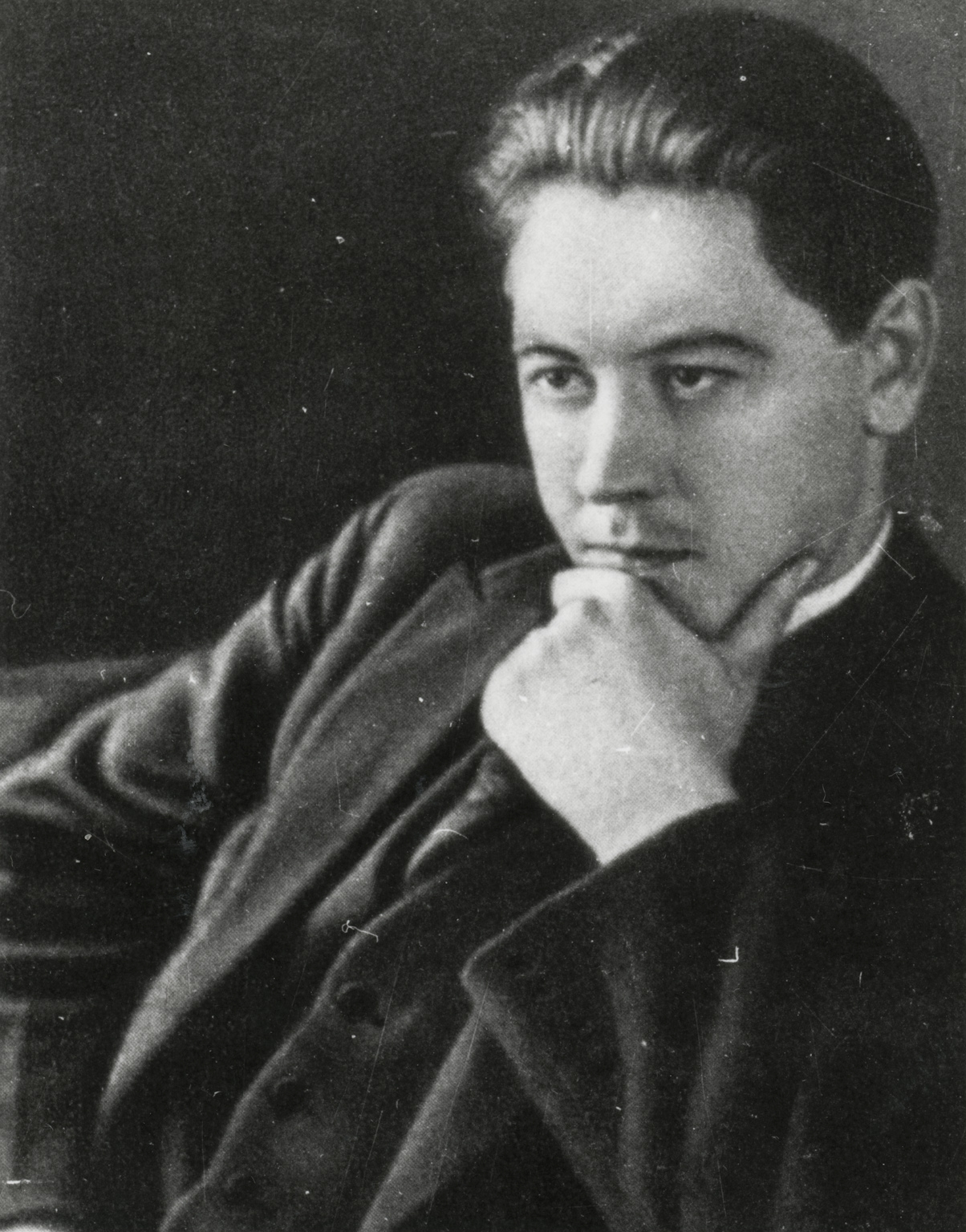
Portrait of Rudolf Nilsen.

Rudolf William Nilsen (28 February 1901 – 23 March 1929) was a Norwegian poet and journalist.

== Early life ==
He was born in the district of Vålerenga in Kristiania (present-day Oslo), on 28 February 1901, and was raised at the nearby neighborhood of Tøyen/Grønland in the same city.

== Writing and political life ==
Rudolf Nilsen's first published work was the collection of poetry På stengrunn (1925), which was followed by På gjensyn (1926). Many of his poems were of political nature, while others were romantic or about the contemporary life in Oslo.

His poem collection, Hverdagen was published posthumously the same year. His collected poems were published in 1935. New collections of his works were published in the 1970s. An album bearing the same title as his first collection of poetry, På Stengrunn, was popular in the 1970s and still in 2019 there are yearly concerts where the songs are performed. Other artists, both Norwegian and other Nordic artists have composed songs to the poems of Rudolf Nilsen, even as recently as 2019.

A child of the working class, Nilsen became part of the left-wing revolutionary movement and joined the organisation Norges Socialdemokratiske Ungdomsforbund (Social Democratic Youth League of Norway), the youth league of the Norwegian Labour Party. When the Norwegian Labour Party split up in 1923, due to an ideological schism, Nilsen decided to join the Communist Party of Norway, and their youth league Young Communist League of Norway.

In 1921, he was arrested and stood trial for smuggling illegal revolutionary literature into Norway. With the help of defence lawyer (and later Secretary-General of the United Nations) Trygve Lie, he avoided sentencing, and was eventually found not guilty and released.

== Personal life and death ==
In 1924, he married Ella Quist Kristoffersen, later Ella Hval.

Nilsen died shortly after contracting tuberculosis in Paris on 23 March 1929. Outside his childhood address of Heimdalsgata nr 26, a public square was named after him in 1952, and a bronze statue of a worker, based on the theme of one of the poems, was erected on that site in 1954.
