= Morten Borgersen =

Norwegian actor, theatre director, artistic director and writer

- Born: 12 October 1950 (age 74); Skien, Norway
- Occupation: Theatre director

Morten Borgersen (born 12 October 1950) is a Norwegian actor, theatre director, artistic director and writer.

== Biography ==
Borgersen has worked for various theatres, including Trøndelag Teater, Rogaland Teater, Riksteatret, Teatret Vårt, Teater Ibsen, Oslo Nye Teater, Det Norske Teatret, Nationaltheatret, Fjernsynsteatret, Den Nationale Scene, Haugesund teater, Nordland Teater, Kilden teater og Konserthus, Opera Bergen og Maksim Gorkij teater, Vladivostok, Russland( Anna Karenina og Et dukkehjem).]. In 1991 he was appointed as the first theatre director of Teatret Vårt in Molde, after nineteen years of collective management, and had this position until 1997. From 1998 to 2001 he was artistic director of Teater Ibsen. He was artistic director of Den Nationale Scene in Bergen from 2001 to 2007.

He published his first novel in 2012: Jeg har arvet en mørk skog. His second novel 2014: Forestillinger. Non-fiction 2015: Våre stemmer.

Cultural offices
Preceded by Bentein Baardson	Director of the Den Nationale Scene; 2001-2007	Succeeded by Bjarte Hjelmeland
