= Jens Gunderssen =

Norwegian actor and theatre director (1912–1969)

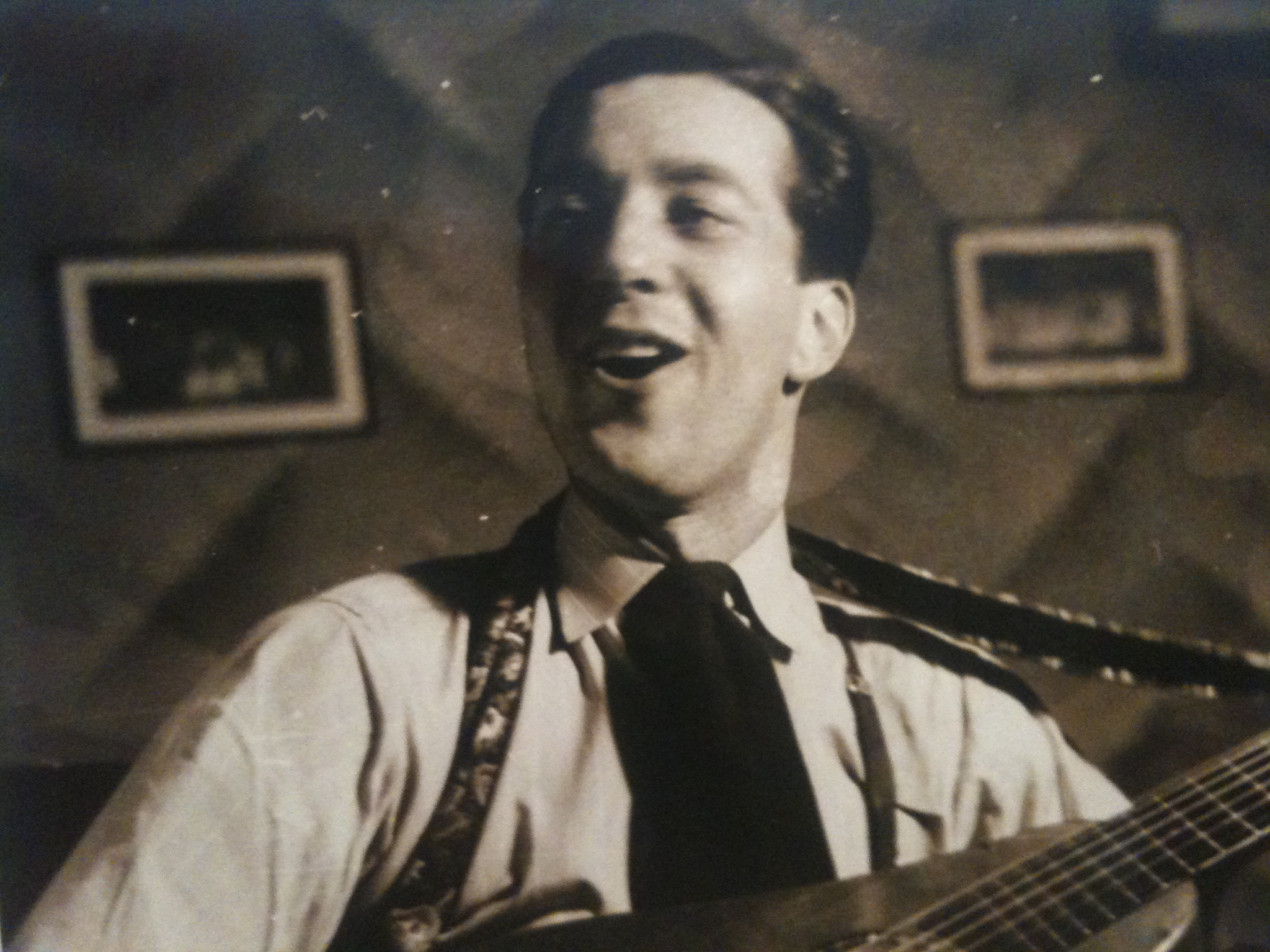
- Born: 19 May 1912; Drammen, Norway
- Died: 11 December 1969 (aged 57)
- Occupations: Singer and songwriter Actor and theatre director

Jens Gunderssen (19 May 1912 – 11 December 1969) was a Norwegian singer, songwriter, actor, stage producer and theatre director.

== Early and personal life ==
Gunderssen was born in Drammen, as son of Karl Gunderssen and Ågot Uhl. His father was a prominent local politician, and mayor in Drammen from 1937 to 1950. He married the actress Gunvor Hall in 1942.

== Career ==
Gunderssen studied law, and finished his cand.jur. degree in 1937 at the University of Oslo. While being a student he played amateur theatre. The leader of Det Nye Teater saw him playing, and offered him a role. Gunderssen made his professional stage debut in April 1939 at Det Nye Teater, where he worked until 1950. After the Second World War, he took part in organizational work. He was chairman of the Norwegian Actors' Equity Association from 1946 to 1950. He was chairman for Norsk Skuespillerråd from 1947 to 1949, and board member of Nordisk Teaterutvalg from 1947 to 1950. He was a member of Statens Filmråd from 1951. He was employed by the Norwegian Broadcasting Corporation as leader for Radioteatret from 1950 to 1952. He worked at actor at Folketeatret from 1952, and as leader from 1955 to 1959. Here he got acclaim for his production of Dylan Thomas' play Under Milk Wood. He worked for Oslo Nye Teater from 1959 to 1969.

He also played minor roles in the films Gullfjellet (1941), Den forsvundne pølsemaker (1941), Jeg drepte --! (1944) and Hans Nielsen Hauge (1961).

Gunderssen was co-founder of Visens Venner in 1944. He wrote several songs, and issued the song books Små viser om små ting (1943), Hu Maja (1945), Ballade! Jens Gunderssens visebok (1949) and På trammen (1962).

Cultural offices
Preceded by Gunnar Neels-Hansson	Director of Radioteatret; 1950–1952	Succeeded by Hans Heiberg
