= Two Living, One Dead =

1961 British film by Anthony Asquith

- Theatrical release poster
- Directed by: Anthony Asquith
- Written by: Anthony Asquith; Lindsay Galloway; Sigurd Christiansen (novel)
- Produced by: Teddy Baird; Karl Moseby
- Starring: Patrick McGoohan; Virginia McKenna; Bill Travers; Alf Kjellin
- Cinematography: Gunnar Fischer
- Edited by: Oscar Rosander
- Music by: Jack Gill; Bengt Hallberg
- Release date: 3 April 1961
- Running time: 105 minutes
- Countries: United Kingdom; Sweden
- Language: English

Two Living, One Dead (also known as Två Levande Och En Död) is a 1961 British-Swedish existentialist thriller film directed by Anthony Asquith and starring Patrick McGoohan, Virginia McKenna and Bill Travers. It was written by Asquith and Lindsay Galloway.

The film is a remake of the 1937 Norwegian film To levende og en død, which in turn was adapted from the novel of the same name by author Sigurd Christiansen. The Scandinavian small-town setting of the earlier film was kept but the action was moved to Sweden.

== Plot ==
Erik Berger is a reticent, socially withdrawn man who has been working for 20 years in the same Post Office in a Swedish town, not socializing with colleagues and interested only in his wife Helen and son. In contrast his workmate Andersson is loud and gregarious, seeing himself as the office joker although his treatment of more junior staff sometimes verges on the malicious.

A violent hold-up – heard, but not shown on screen – takes place, during which the office supervisor is shot dead and Andersson suffers a head injury which knocks him out and leaves him concussed. Berger meanwhile, entering the office after hearing the commotion and thinking of his family, resists the urge to risk his life by trying to fight back against the raiders, and emerges uninjured from the incident. In the aftermath, he is treated with barely disguised contempt by the police, his employers and the local community in general, who make it clear that they consider his failure to fight back a mark of spineless cowardice. He does not receive the promotion to office supervisor, which he was previously in line for on the retirement of his boss; instead the job is given to Andersson, who is now being cast in a heroic light. As he becomes increasingly depressed by his ostracism, his relationship with Helen suffers and he feels unable to confide in her. He comes to see himself as the coward everybody is accusing him of being, and even Helen begins to wonder whether he could have acted differently.

Berger takes to solitary nocturnal wandering around the town, and meets a stranger, Rogers, to whom he begins to open up about his recent experiences, albeit while pretending that he is a "friend" of the man involved. Berger and Rogers begin to meet up frequently on their night-time wanderings, and one night, as they part company outside Berger's home, Helen unexpectedly opens the door and invites Rogers in for supper. As they talk, she realizes that her husband has chosen to confide in a stranger rather than her and feels hurt and betrayed. In her distress, she reveals to Berger that their son too is being shunned by his schoolmates and taunted by the allegation that his father is a coward, but has been trying to keep this from Berger, not wanting to add to his unhappiness.

The Bergers' relationship deteriorates to the point where they are completely alienated from one another. Seeing this, Rogers eventually admits to Berger that he and his brother were the Post Office robbers, and his brother has since been killed in an accident. Moreover, he lives in the same lodging-house as Andersson, and the robbery was only planned as a consequence of Andersson's constant chatter about the large amount of cash held in the office and when it was most readily accessible. He states that he certainly would have shot Berger had he fought back, but now genuinely regrets the turmoil he has caused to his life, and goes on to reveal that Andersson's injury was not a result of fearless bravery, but happened rather when he ran into a doorframe in his panic to escape.

Appalled to discover Andersson's hypocrisy and the craven manner in which he has glorified in his unwarranted heroic status, Berger borrows Rogers' gun and stages another incident in which he exposes Andersson for the man of straw he really is. Having exorcised his demons he returns home to Helen feeling vindicated, and she realizes that their relationship can get back on an even keel.

== Cast ==
- Patrick McGoohan as Erik Berger
- Virginia McKenna as Helen Berger
- Bill Travers as Andersson
- Alf Kjellin as Rogers
- Noel Willman as Johnson
- Dorothy Alison as Esther Kester
- Peter Vaughan as John Kester
- Isa Quensel as Miss Larousse
- Derek Francis as Broms
- Michael Crawford as Nils Lindwall
- John Moulder-Brown as Rolf Berger
- Georg Skarstedt as Torp
- Mona Geijer-Falkner as Mrs. Holm
- Torsten Lilliecrona as the doctor
- Alan Rothwell as Karlson
- Pauline Jameson as Miss Larsen
- Marianne Nielsen as Miss Lind
- Peter Bathurst as Engelhardt

== Production ==
Two Living, One Dead was shot on location in Stockholm County, with local studio facilities in the Swedish capital also being used. Asquith used several Swedish crew members and actors in the film.
