= Norwegian Actors' Equity Association =

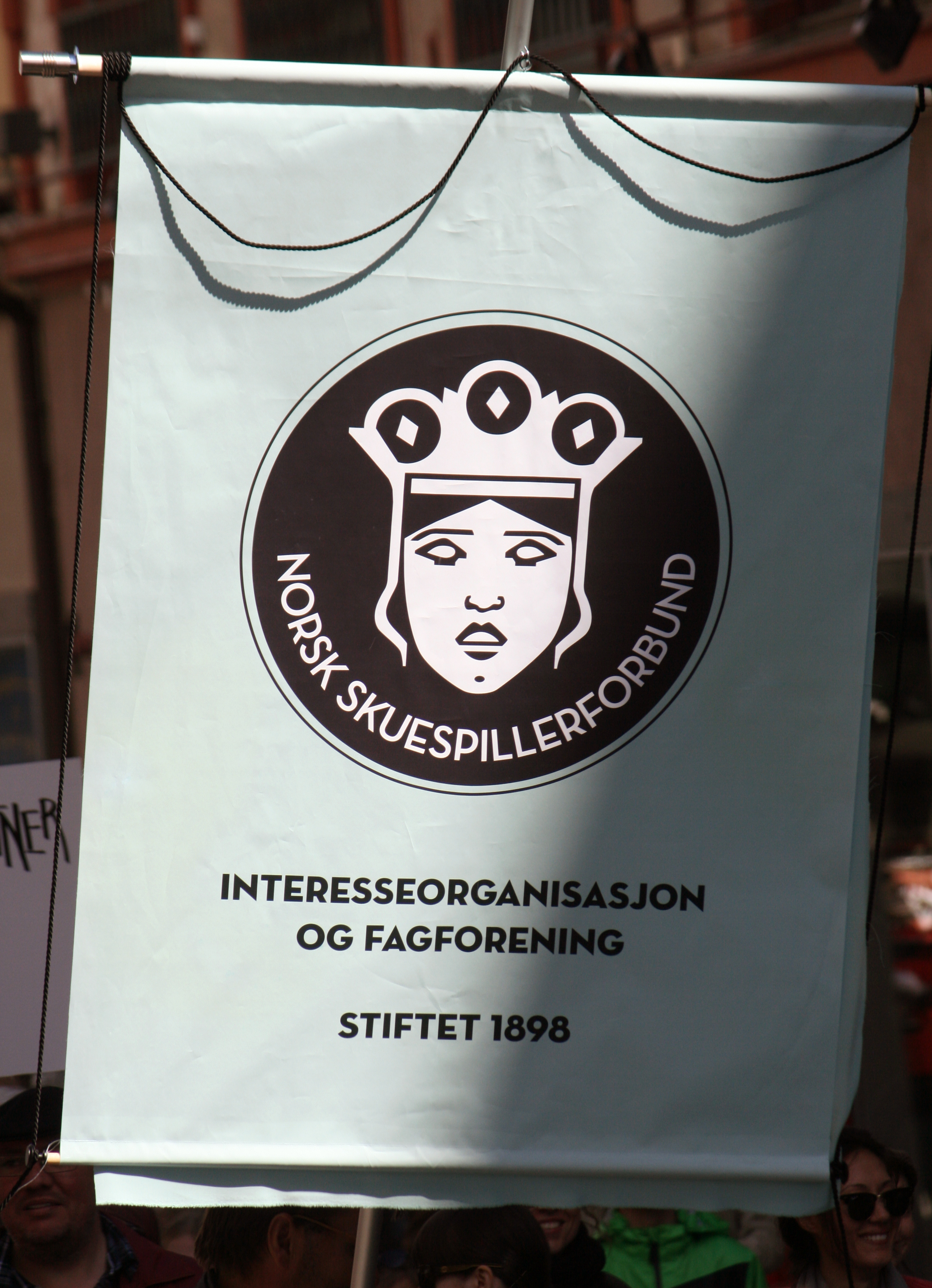

The Norwegian Actors' Equity Association (Norwegian: Norsk Skuespillerforbund) is an association of Norwegian actors. Its main purpose is to improve actors' working conditions and to protect the artistic, judicial and financial interests of actors in Norway. The association was established in 1898, after an initiative from actor Sigurd Asmundsen at a birthday party in 1897, followed by a preparatory meeting in April 1898, and a constituent meeting 27 October 1898. The first chairman was Sigvard Gundersen, with Johanne Dybwad as vice chairman, and Christian Sandal as first secretary. Important issues during the early years were contractual conditions, pensions, and regulation of foreign ensembles. The association's first Honorary member was actor and later theatrical director Bjørn Bjørnson, nominated in May 1900.

The Association currently has 1250 members, of whom approximately 155 are permanently employed and 150 temporarily employed in institutional theatres. NAEA publishes Skuespillerkatalogen – the Actors' Catalogue. As the leading national casting resource, it is used by most Norwegian TV, Film, Radio and Theatre companies.

== List of leaders ==
- 1898–1899 Sigvard Gundersen
- 1899–1901 Olav Voss
- 1901–1903 Ludvig Müller
- 1903–1904 Ludvig Bergh
- 1904–1905 Halfdan Christensen
- 1905–1907 Theodor Blich
- 1907–1913 Ludvig Müller
- 1913–1915 Harald Stormoen
- 1915–1918 Thomas Thomassen
- 1918–1920 Egil Eide
- 1920–1921 Thorleif Klausen
- 1921–1924 Harald Stormoen
- 1924–1925 Thomas Thomassen
- 1925–1928 Harald Stormoen
- 1928–1932 Einar Sissener
- 1932–1940 Egil Hjorth-Jenssen
- 1940–1941 David Knudsen
- 1941– Harald Schwenzen
- 1942–1945 Einar Sissener (acting)
- 1945– Harald Schwenzen
- 1945– Georg Løkkeberg
- 1945–1946 Øyvind Øyen (acting)
- 1946–1950 Jens Gunderssen
- 1951–1961 Ella Hval
- 1962-1964 Gunnar Olram
- 1965–1967 Ella Hval
- 1967–1969 Bjarne Andersen
- 1970–1974 Knut Mørch Hansson
- 1974-1976 Finn Kvalem
- 1977–1980 Karen Randers-Pehrson
- 1980-1995 Ragnhild Nygaard
- 1995-2000 Bernhard Ramstad
- 2000–2011 Agnete G. Haaland
- 2011–2015 Hauk Heyerdahl
- 2015– Knut Alfsen
