= Thomas Thomassen =

Norwegian actor, director and theater manager

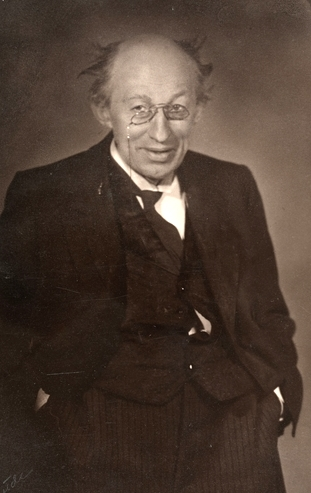
- Thomas Thomassen i Vildanden i 1942.
- Born: 19 November 1878
- Died: 7 January 1962 (aged 83)
- Spouse(s): Ingebjørg Thomassen
- Awards: Knight of the Order of the Dannebrog (1928)

Thomas Thomassen (19 November 1878 – 7 January 1962) was a Norwegian actor, director and theater manager.

== Biography ==
Thomassen was born in Tønsberg, Norway. He was the son of Thomas Marthinius Thomassen (1845–1925) and Laura Christine Thoresen (1847–1931). He made his stage debut in 1900 at Centralteatret. He served as theatre director of Stavanger Faste Scene from 1918 to 1921, and of Den Nationale Scene in Bergen from 1925 to 1931.

He chaired the Norwegian Actors' Equity Association from 1915 to 1918, and from 1924 to 1925.

In 1904, he married Ingebjørg Klafstad (1878–1961). He was the father of the actor and director Knut Thomassen (1921–2002).

Cultural offices
Preceded by Christian Sandal	Director of the Den Nationale Scene; 1925–1931	Succeeded by Karl Bergmann
