= Bentein Baardson =

Norwegian actor, instructor and theatre director

- Born: 6 November 1953 (age 72); New York City, New York, United States
- Occupations: Actor, instructor and theatre director
- Parent: Brynjolv Baardson (father)

Bentein Baardson (born 6 November 1953 in New York City) is a Norwegian actor, instructor and theatre director.

He was born in New York, and is the son of Brynjolv Baardson.

Bentein Baardson graduated from Teaterhøyskolen in 1975. He has set up plays at a number of theatres, including Nationaltheatret, Det Norske Teatret, Den Nationale Scene and Agder Teater. He was theatre director at Rogaland Teater from 1986 to 1989, leading Agder Teater from its opening in 1991 to 1994, was art director for the opening and closing ceremonies at the 1994 Winter Olympics in Lillehammer, and theatre director at Den Nationale Scene from 1998 to 2001. In 2005 he directed the gala concert at Oslo Konserthus in connection with the 1905 jubilee. Baardson was the artistic and executive director of the 2006 Ibsen Year.

In 1980, Bentein Baardson was awarded the first Per Aabels ærespris, an annual honorary award which is named for respected Norwegian comic actor, Per Aabel. In 1998, Baardson received the Anders Jahres kulturpris, an honorary award named for Norwegian shipping magnate, Anders August Jahre. He was decorated Knight, First Class of the Order of St. Olav in 2000. He has been appointed member of the Norwegian Academy for Language and Literature. Managing Director in Kilden Performing Arts Centre from February 2012.

Cultural offices
| Preceded by Alf Nordvang | Director of the Rogaland Teater; 1986–1989 | Succeeded by Hans Rosenquist |
| Preceded by Lars Arrhed | Director of the Den Nationale Scene; 1998–2001 | Succeeded by Morten Borgersen |
