= Brynjolv Baardson =

Norwegian World War II officer

- Born: December 25, 1921; Kristiansand, Norway
- Died: July 19, 2002 (aged 80)
- Military career
- Allegiance: United States
- Branch: United States Army
- Conflicts: Second World War

Brynjolv Baardson (December 25, 1921 – July 19, 2002) was a Norwegian sailor and businessperson, and a US Army officer.

During World War II, Baardson was a sailor in the Norwegian merchant marine, serving aboard the MS Ravnaas when she was sunk by Japanese aircraft off Samar Island in December 1941. In January 1942 he volunteered to the United States Army and fought with in the jungles of Cebu Island, was imprisoned in Japanese prisoner-of-war camps in the Philippines and Japan along with American soldiers, and returned to the US in 1945, where he was given the rank of captain. He published the memoir book Kiotskee! in 1981, with accounts of his experiences in the jungle of Cebu and later in Japanese internment camps. His memoirs are extensively cited in Guri Hjeltnes' work from 1997 on the history of the Norwegian merchant fleet.

He was married to Kirsten Margrethe Baardson (1929–1996), and is the father of theatre director Bentein Baardson.
