= Fri Norsk Scene =

Fri Norsk Scene was a theatre group consisting of Norwegian actors residing as refugees in Sweden during World War II. It was established in 1944, and was active until May 1945. The group was led by Halfdan Christensen. Among the theatre's productions were Ibsen's play The Master Builder (Norwegian: Bygmester Solness), Bjørnson's Geografi og Kjærlighet and Arnulf Øverland's Venner.
