= Gyda Christensen =

Norwegian actress, dancer and choreographer

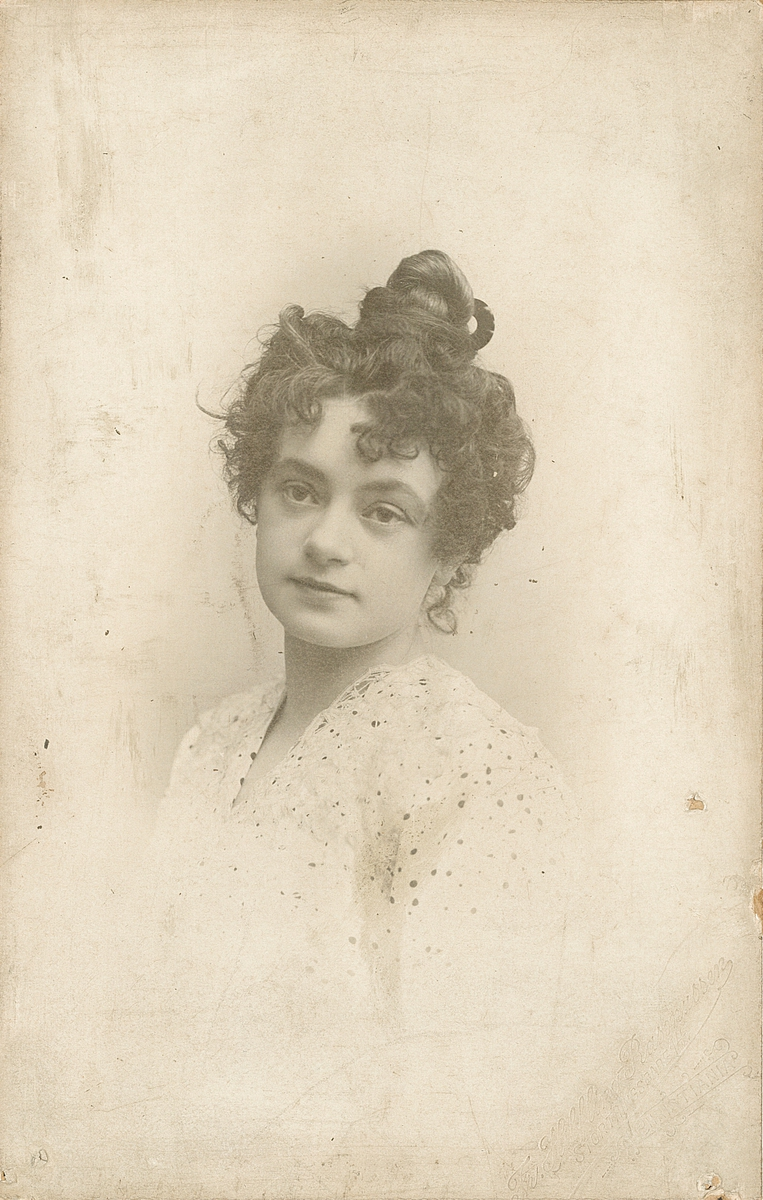
- Born: 21 May 1872
- Died: 20 August 1964 (aged 92)
- Spouse(s): Halfdan Christensen, C. J. Hambro, Georg Monrad Krohn

Gyda Martha Kristine Christensen (née Andersen; 21 May 1872 – 20 August 1964) was a Norwegian actress, dancer, choreographer and managing director.

== Biography ==
Christensen was born in Kristiania (now Oslo), Norway. She was the only child of Ole Andersen and Cathrine Saabye. She received music and singing lessons during adolescence.

She was part of the ensemble at Christiania Theatre from 1894 to 1899 and again from 1920 to 1928, and at Nationaltheatret from 1899 to 1919. She played a number of major roles, most often in the light genre. In 1915, Max Reinhardt saw one of her plays in Oslo and was so enthused that he hired her as a choreographer for the Deutsches Theater Berlin and as a teacher at the acting school there, where she taught until 1919. She was engaged as dance and artistic director at Det Nye Teater from 1928 to 1945. From 1936 to 1939 she was the artistic director at Nationaltheatret. In 1909 she became the managing director for the Nationaltheatret ballet school. In 1937 she directed the film To levende og en død with her son-in-law Tancred Ibsen.

== Personal life ==
In 1893, she married engineer Georg Monrad Krohn (1865–1934). They were the parents of dancer and actress Lillebil Ibsen (1899–1989) who was married to film director Tancred Ibsen (1893–1978).

In 1905, she married theater director Halfdan Christensen (1873–1950). In 1946, she married political leader Carl Joachim Hambro (1885–1964).
