= Det Nye Teater =

Former theatre in Oslo, Norway

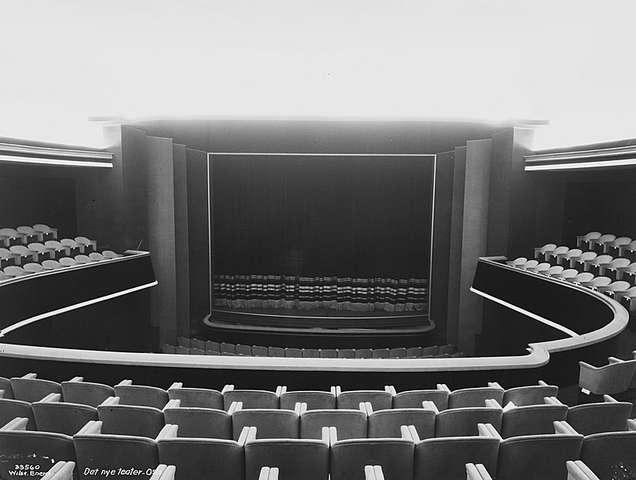
- Det Nye Teater auditorium, 1929
- Interactive map of Det Nye Teater
- Address: Oslo; Norway
- Coordinates: 59°54′52″N 10°44′23″E
- Type: Theatre

Construction
- Opened: 26 February 1929
- Closed: September 1959
- Years active: 1929–1959
- Architects: Gudolf Blakstad, Jens Gram Dunker

Det Nye Teater was a theatre that opened in Oslo, Norway, in 1929, and operated independently until 1959, when it merged with Folketeatret to form Oslo Nye Teater. Its original purpose was to support contemporary Norwegian drama.

== History ==
The company A/S Det Nye Teater was founded in 1918, by Johan Bojer and Peter Egge. Among its largest financial supporters was ship owner Ivar An Christensen as well as the Norwegian government, which bought a significant number of shares. The building was designed by the architects Gudolf Blakstad and Jens Gram Dunker. The theatre's first artistic director was Ingolf Schanche, from 1928 to 1931.

Det Nye Teater opened on 26 February 1929, with Knut Hamsun's trilogy Ved rigets port, Livets spil, and Aftenrøde, followed by Egge's play Kjærlighet og venskap. From 1931 to 1932, Thomas Thomassen managed the theatre, and from 1932 to 1933, it was run by Gyda Christensen. Einar Sissener was theatre director from 1933 to 1934, and Hjalmar Friis and Christensen jointly ran it from 1934 to 1935. Sissener and Fridtjof Mjøen were managers until 1937, when Victor Bernau took over, until 1939. From that year, the theatre was managed by Gyda Christensen, followed by Tore Foss, from 1945 to 1947. Axel Otto Normann managed the theatre from 1947 to 1959. He was also the first director at Oslo Nye Teater, after Det Nye Teater's merger with Folketeatret, in 1959.

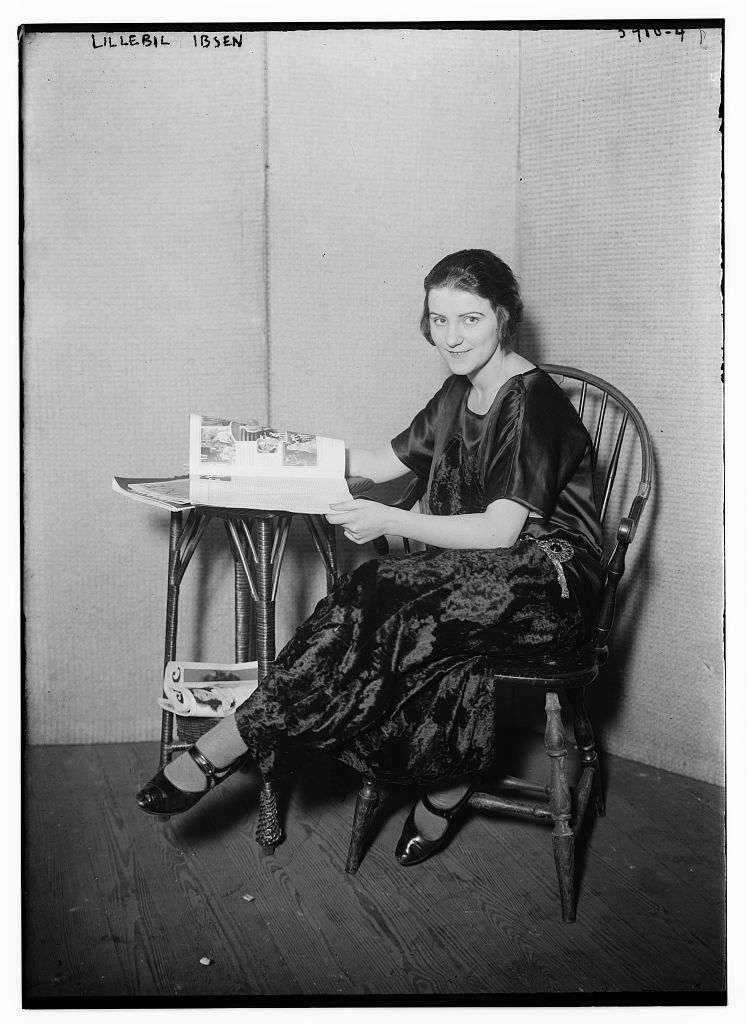
Lillebil Ibsen was among the staff at Det Nye Teater.

Among actors who performed at Det Nye Teater were Hauk Aabel, Gunnar Tolnæs, Harald Stormoen, Knut Hergel, Agnes Mowinckel, Alfred Maurstad, Harald Steen, Tore Segelcke, Georg Løkkeberg, Wenche Foss, Jens Gunderssen, Sonja Wigert, Lillebil Ibsen, Henki Kolstad, Merete Skavlan, Knut Thomassen, Arne Thomas Olsen, Mona Hofland, Johannes Eckhoff, and Per Sunderland.
