= To levende og en død (film) =

- Directed by: Gyda Christensen; Tancred Ibsen
- Written by: Sigurd Christiansen (novel); Tancred Ibsen
- Starring: Hans Jacob Nilsen; Unni Torkildsen; Jan Vaage; Toralf Sandø
- Cinematography: Olle Comstedt
- Music by: Carsten Carlsen
- Release date: 6 September 1937
- Country: Norway
- Language: Norwegian

To levende og en død (lit. Two living and one dead) is a 1937 Norwegian thriller film directed by Gyda Christensen and Tancred Ibsen and starring Hans Jacob Nilsen, Unni Torkildsen and Jan Vaage. It is based on the 1931 novel To levende og en død by Sigurd Christiansen.

== Premise ==
A post office worker is left wrestling with his conscience following a robbery at his workplace.

== Cast ==
- Hans Jacob Nilsen as Erik Berger, postal clerk
- Unni Torkildsen as Helene Berger
- Jan Vaage as Knut, their son
- Toralf Sandø as Lydersen, postal clerk
- Lauritz Falk as Rognås, bankclerk
- Hans Bille as the postmaster
- Hilda Fredriksen as the hostess of the hostel
- Joachim Holst-Jensen as Engelhardt
- Thoralf Klouman as the chief of postal services
- Guri Stormoen as shop assistant
- Axel Thue as police inspector
- Einar Vaage as Kvisthus
- J. Barclay-Nitter as a postal inspector
- Elsa Sandø as Fru Lydersen
- Knut Jacobsen as the doctor
- Kolbjørn Brenda as a postal clerk
- Marie Hedemark as guest at the hostel
- Ingse Vibe as guest at the hostel
- Signe Ramberg as guest at the hostel
- Alfred Solaas as guest at the hostel

== Bibliography ==
- Soila, Tytti & Söderbergh-Widding, Astrid & Iverson, Gunnar. Nordic National Cinemas. Routledge, 1998.
