= Den Nationale Scene =

Theatre in Bergen, Norway

Coordinates: 60.393°N 5.320°E

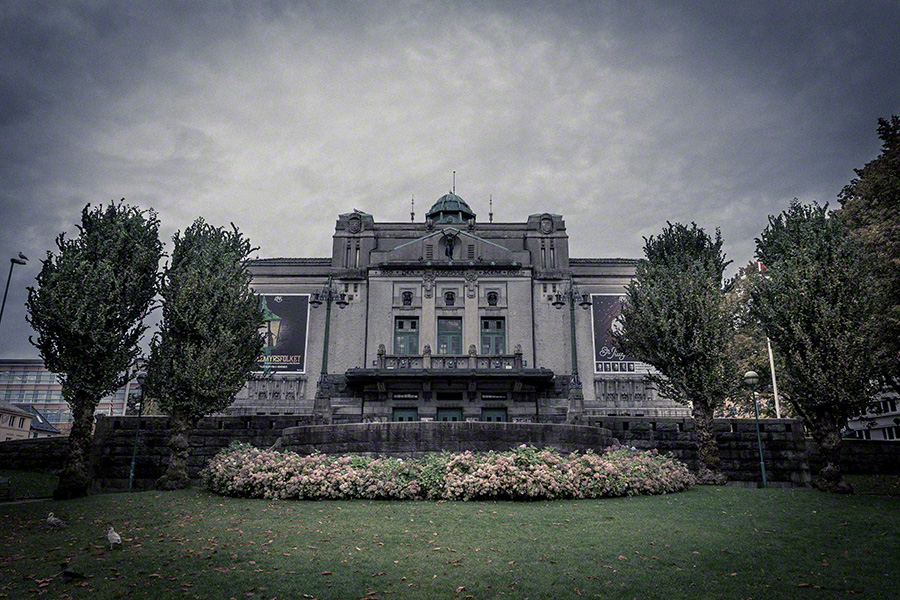
Den Nationale Scene in Bergen

Den Nationale Scene (English: National Theater) is the largest theatre in Bergen, Norway. Den Nationale Scene is also one of the oldest permanent theatres in Norway.

== History ==
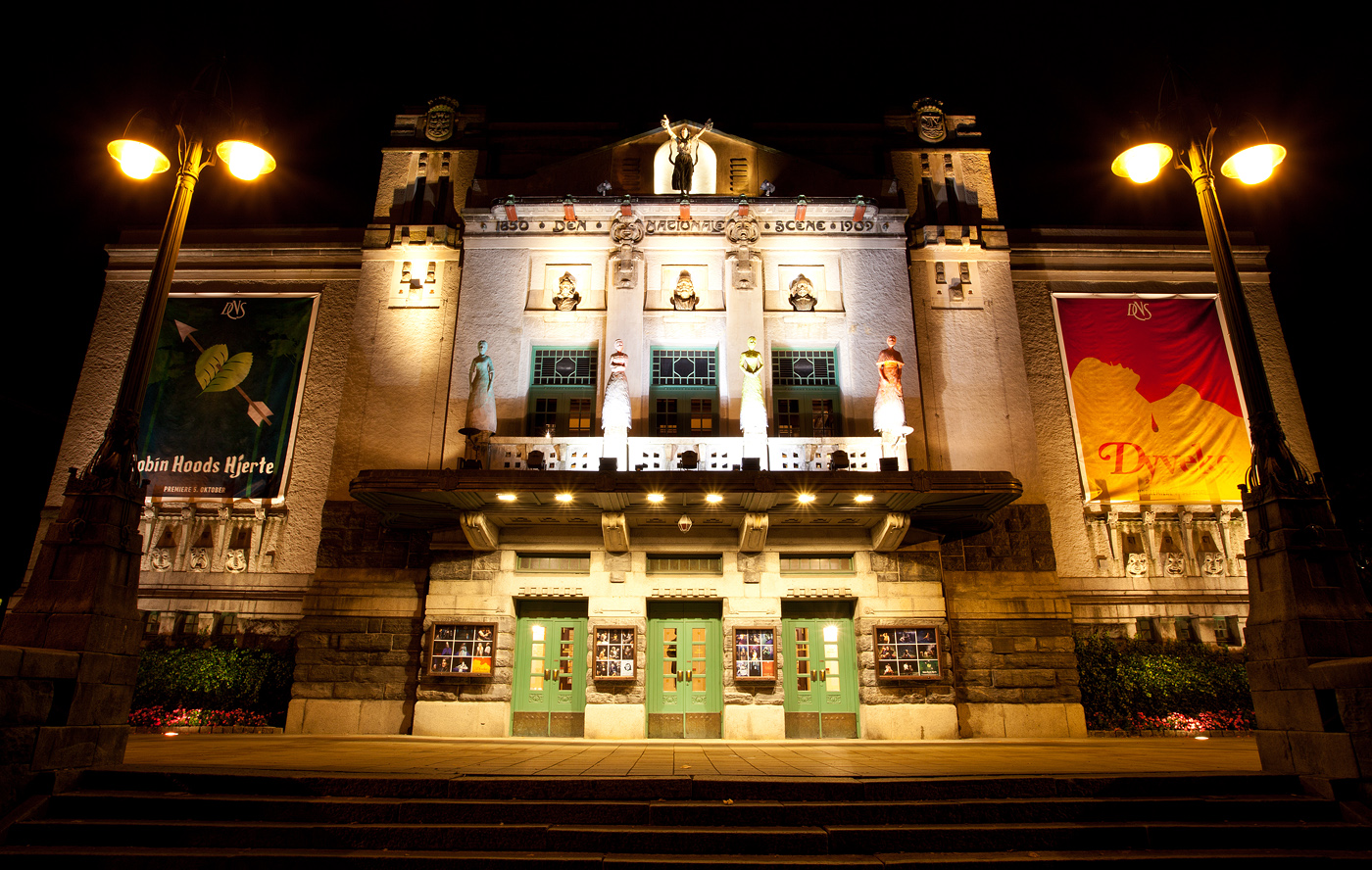
Den Nationale Scene at night in 2013

Opened under the name Det Norske Theater in 1850, the theatre has roots dating back to its founding on the initiative of the Norwegian violinist Ole Bull. The theatre was created to develop Norwegian playwrights. Henrik Ibsen was one of the first writers-in-residences and art-directors of the theatre and it saw the première in Norway of his first contemporary realist drama The Pillars of Society (Samfundets støtter) on 30 November 1877.

The theatre was initially housed in the Komediehuset på Engen. In 1909, The National Theatre moved into the new theatre building at Engen. The current theatre building was designed by Einar Oscar Schou, and opened 19 February 1909 with a production of Erasmus Montanus by Ludvig Holberg. King Haakon VII of Norway and Queen Maud were in attendance. It soon became apparent that the building was too small. In 1913 the company bought Ekserserhuset Jonsvoll to use as a warehouse. In 1920, an extension was built to the northwest. Over the years the building has undergone major changes, extensions, renovation, restoration and stage technical modernisation. The foyer and the hall were destroyed during the Second World War, and only temporarily restored.

The theatre experienced a pre-war high point during the period 1934-39 under the leadership Hans Jacob Nilsen. Especially noteworthy was the 1935 premiere of the play Vår ære og vår makt ("Our Honor and our Power") by Nordahl Grieg.

In 2001 the building was restored almost to its original shape. Today the theatre houses three stages/venues and presents approximately 20 productions each year, both international and national classics, musicals and contemporary drama, as well as children's theatre. Since 1993, the theatre has been state property.

== Directors of the Theatre ==
- 1876–1879 Nils Wichstrøm
- 1879–1880 Johan Bøgh
- 1880–1881 John Grieg
- 1881–1884 Johan Bøgh
- 1884–1888 Gunnar Heiberg
- 1888–1889 Henrik Jæger
- 1889–1890 Otto Valseth
- 1890–1895 Johan Irgens-Hansen
- 1895–1898 Olaf Hansson
- 1899–1900 Hans Aanrud
- 1900–1905 Gustav Thomassen
- 1905–1907 Anton Heiberg
- 1908–1909 Olaf Mørch Hansson
- 1910–1924 Ludvig Bergh
- 1924–1925 Christian Sandal
- 1925–1931 Thomas Thomassen
- 1931–1934 Karl Bergmann
- 1934–1939 Hans Jacob Nilsen
- 1939–1946 Egil Hjorth-Jenssen
- 1946–1948 Stein Bugge
- 1948–1952 Georg Løkkeberg
- 1952–1961 Per Schwab
- 1961–1963 Bjarne Andersen
- 1963–1967 Gisle Straume
- 1967–1976 Knut Thomassen
- 1976–1982 Sven Henning
- 1982–1986 Kjetil Bang-Hansen
- 1986–1996 Tom Remlov
- 1996–1997 Ketil Egge
- 1997 Aksel-Otto Bull
- 1998 Lars Arrhed
- 1998–2001 Bentein Baardson
- 2001–2007 Morten Borgersen
- 2008–2012 Bjarte Hjelmeland
- 2012–2019 Agnete Haaland
- 2020–2023 Stefan Larsson
- 2023– Solrun Toft Iversen

== Gallery ==
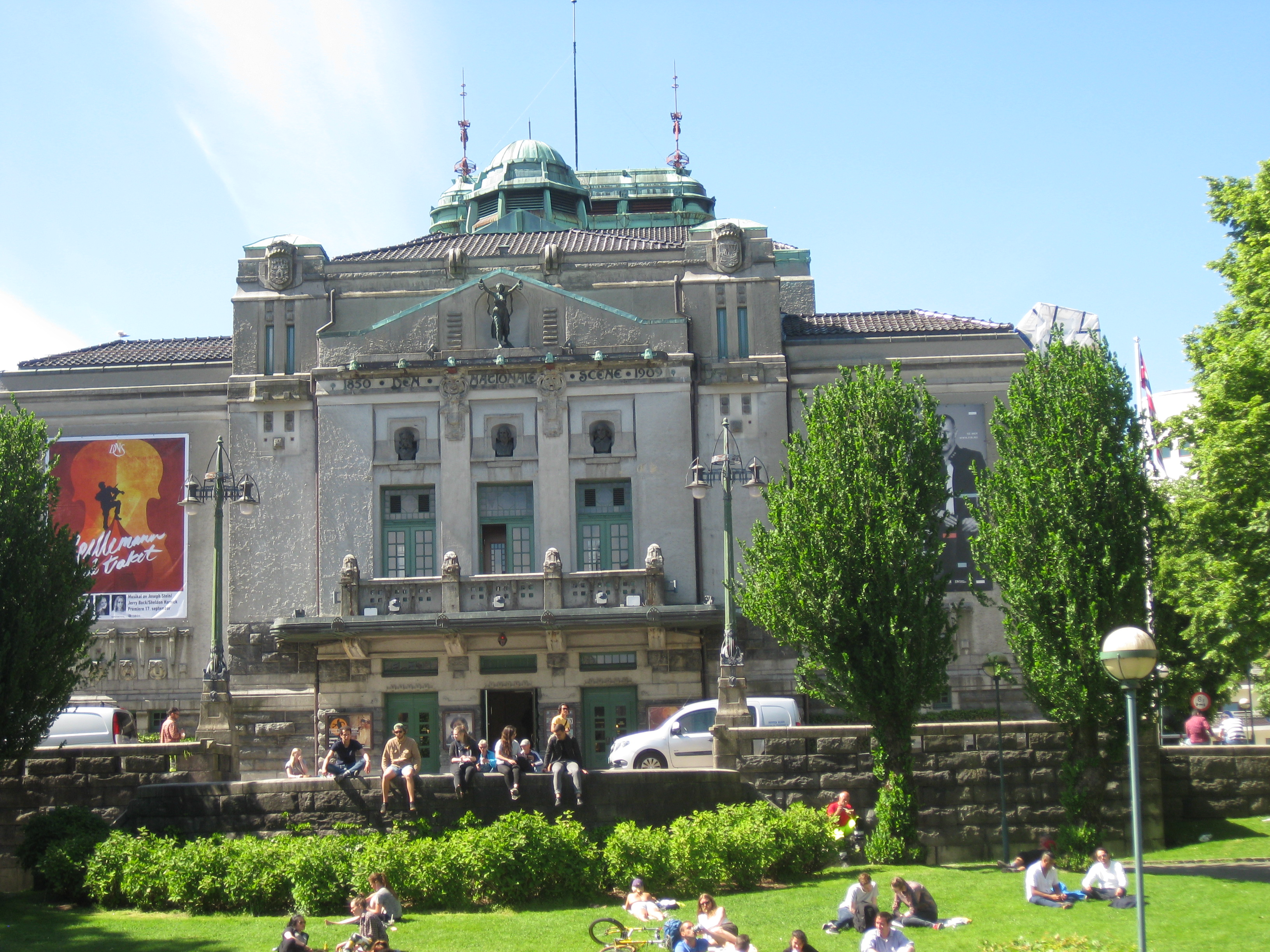

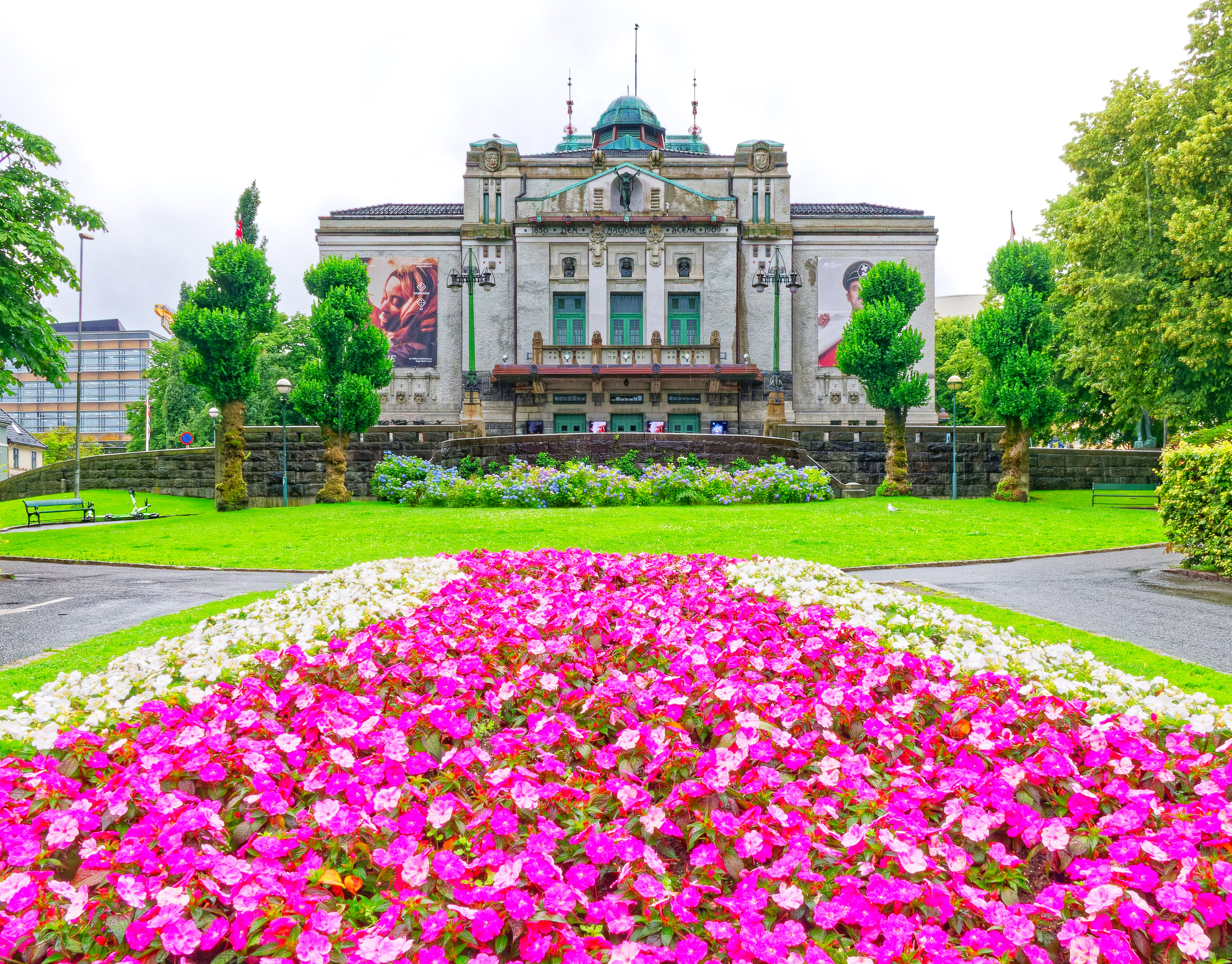

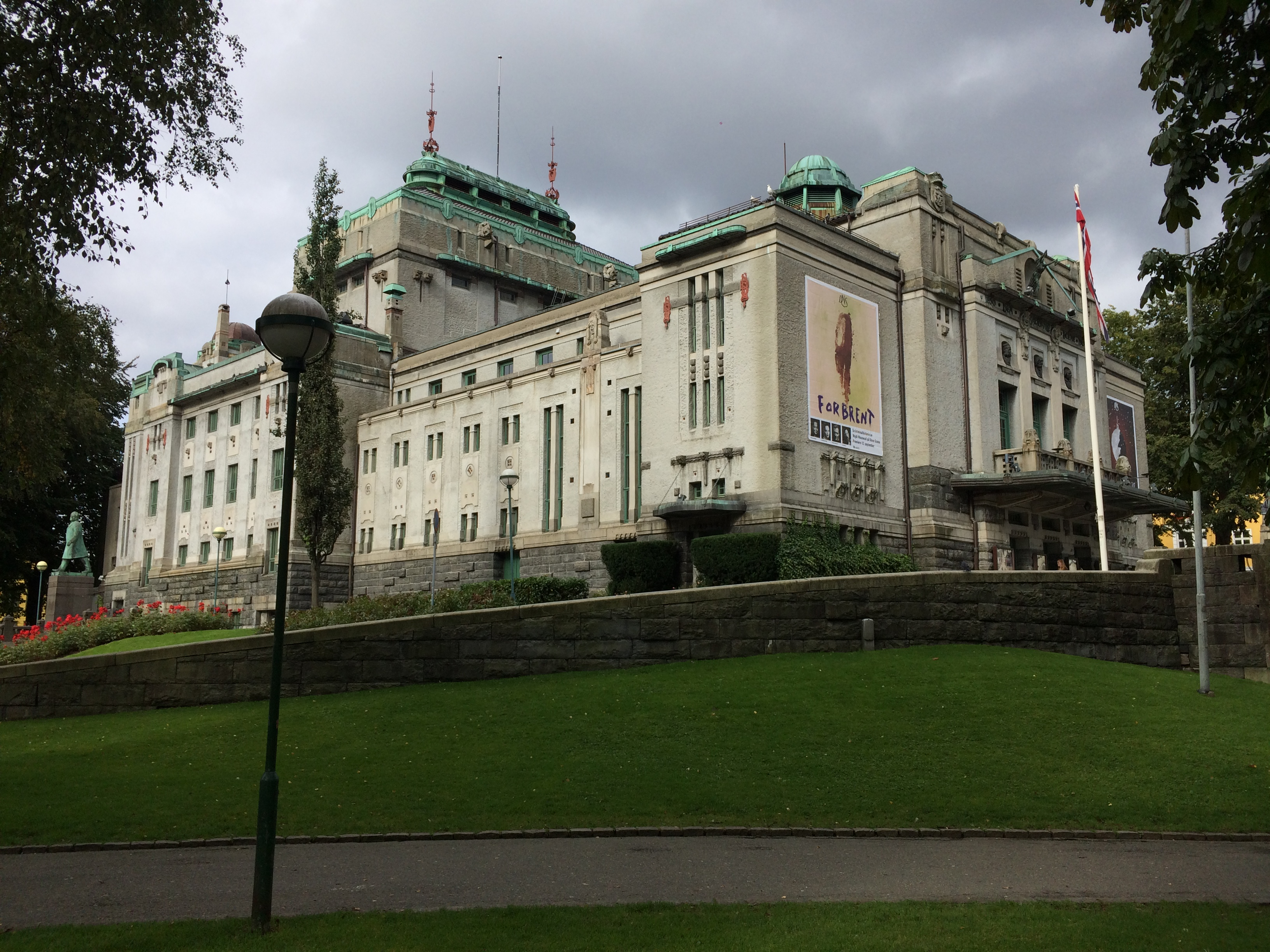

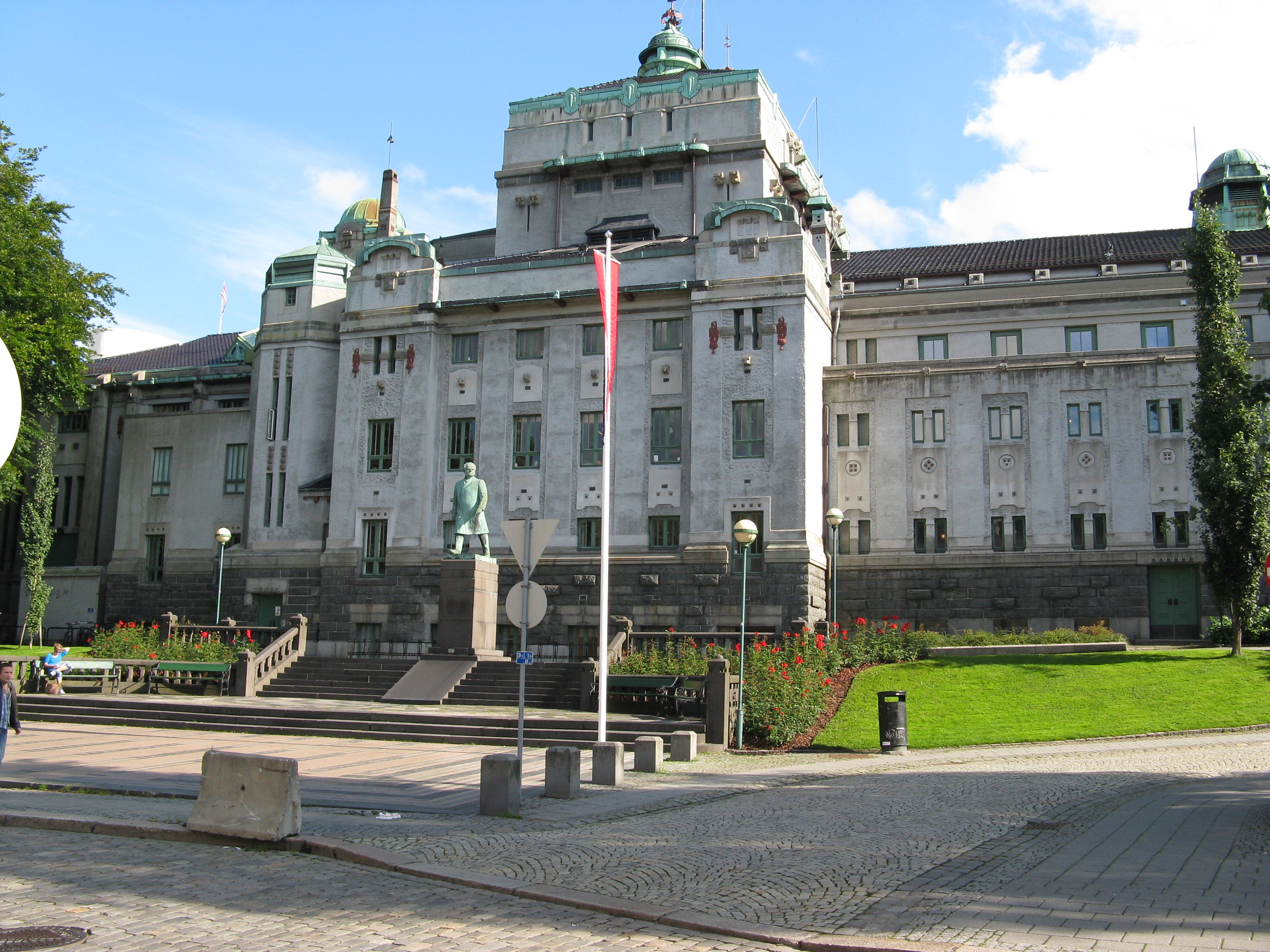

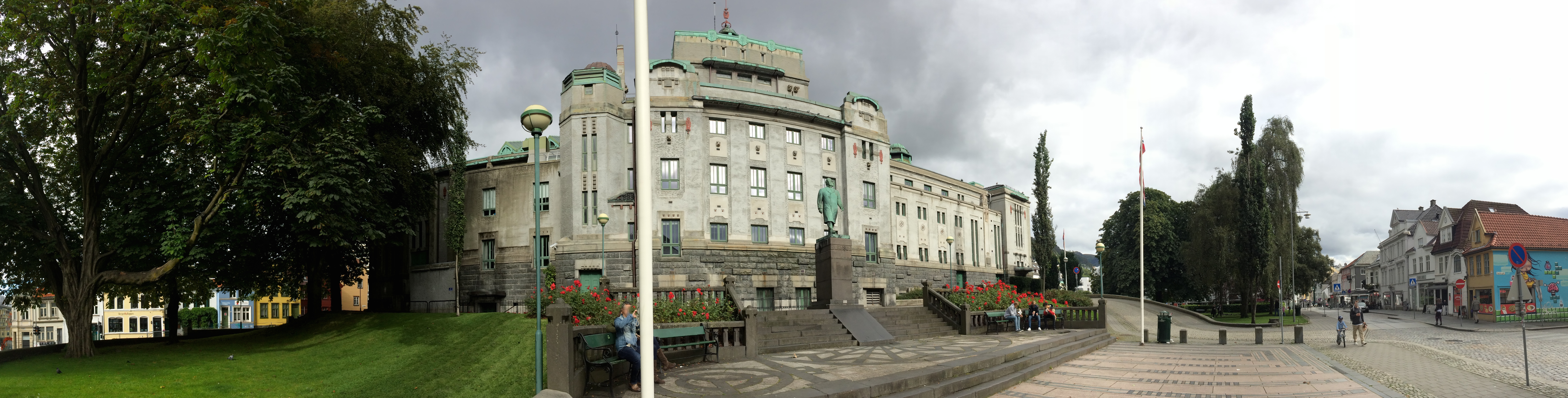

== See also ==
- Thorolf Rafto Memorial Prize
