= Musikanter =

- Directed by: Arne Skouen
- Written by: Arne Skouen
- Starring: Leif Juster
- Cinematography: Odd Geir Sæther
- Edited by: Bjørn Breigutu
- Music by: Bjarne Amdahl
- Distributed by: Ara-Film AS
- Release date: August 29, 1967
- Running time: 80 minutes
- Country: Norway
- Language: Norwegian

Musikanter (The Musicians) is a 1967 Norwegian comedy film directed and written by Arne Skouen. Leif Juster appears in the role of Maistro. The film premiered on August 29, 1967, at theaters in Oslo, Bergen, Trondheim, Kristiansand, Drammen, and Hamar.

== Plot ==
Maistro works as a janitor at a music school. The students come running to him with all their problems. Among other things, he has the job of getting them a roof over their heads through trickery and leniency, and lies and trickery. The janitor encourages, comforts, scolds, and slaps them. The students call him Maistro because he has to direct them all. In his room, he nurtures his secret dream of being a world-famous conductor.

== Cast ==
- Leif Juster as Maistro, the janitor
- Synne Skouen as Vivi
- Henki Kolstad as Bille, the ship owner
- Henny Moan as Tora, the dentist's wife
- Arne Aas as Ludvig, the poet
- Carsten Byhring as Gulbrand, the fruit seller
- Gudrun Waadeland as Annik, an expecting mother
- Egil Hjorth-Jenssen as Beethoven, a music teacher
- Turid Balke as the colonel's wife
- Willie Hoel as a moving man
- Eva von Hanno as Nelly
- Per Christensen as a janitor
- Kåre Siem as Albert, a music teacher
- Inger Teien as the poet's wife
- Bjarne Bø as a moving man
- Nils Sletta as Jørgen
- Kjersti Dalbye as Berta
- Tom Remlov as the organ student
- Mette Lange-Nielsen as the housewife
- Ranveig Eckhoff as the singing student
- Endre Kleve as the violin student
- Steinar Ofsdal as the bass player
- Svein Wickstrøm
- Per Ivar Moe

== Music ==
The Big Swing College Band and NRK's junior orchestra under the direction of Herbert Bergene performed the music for the film.
