= Børsum =

Børsum may refer to:

- Bente Børsum (born 1934), Norwegian actress
- Lise Børsum (1908–1985), Norwegian resistance member during World War II
