= Oss (film) =

- Directed by: Laila Mikkelsen
- Written by: Laila Mikkelsen
- Based on: A story by Knut Faldbakken
- Produced by: Tage Linde
- Starring: Knut Husebø; Ellen Horn; Astrid Folstad; Eyvind Haugestøl; Trine Berntsen
- Cinematography: Erling Thurmann-Andersen
- Edited by: Edith Toreg
- Distributed by: Maipo AS
- Release date: September 30, 1976
- Running time: 86 minutes
- Country: Norway
- Language: Norwegian

Oss (Us) is a Norwegian post-apocalyptic disaster film from 1976 directed by Laila Mikkelsen. The film is based on a story by Knut Faldbakken.

== Plot ==
The film is about the aftermath of an economic disaster as a result of poor countries stopping their exports of raw materials. In Norway and the Western world, this leads to unemployment, food shortages, and demonstrations. Many people head out to the countryside. Among these are Thomas and Vera, who end up renting a farm in a remote valley. Life there is not easy, and military forces seize the crops.

== Cast ==
- Knut Husebø as Thomas
- Ellen Horn as Vera
- Astrid Folstad as Moren
- Eyvind Haugestøl as Einar
- Trine Berntsen as Elin
- Eric Scobie as Lasse
- Ivar Nørve as Espen
- Arne Aas as Finansminister
- Kåre Dalen as Bonde
- Lauritz Falk as Statsminister 2
- Bjørn Floberg as Fenrik
- Anne Gullestad as Sekretær departem.
- Jon I. Henriksen as Sekretær til stat.
- Erik Hivju as Plyndringsmann
- Jorunn Kjellsby as Tove
- Olav Kvaale as Lensmann
- Henry Moen as Bonde
- Bjarne Øverbø as Kjøpmann
