= Sønstevold =

Sønstevold is a Norwegian surname. Notable people with the surname include:

- Anja Sønstevold (born 1992), Norwegian footballer
- Gunnar Sønstevold (1912–1991), Norwegian composer, husband of Maj
- Maj Sønstevold (1917–1996), Swedish composer
