= Skouen =

Skouen is a surname most prevalent in Norway. Notable people with the surname include:

- Arne Skouen (1913–2003), Norwegian journalist, author, film director, and film producer
- Synne Skouen (born 1950), Norwegian music writer and composer
