= Arne Aas (actor) =

Norwegian actor (1931–2000)

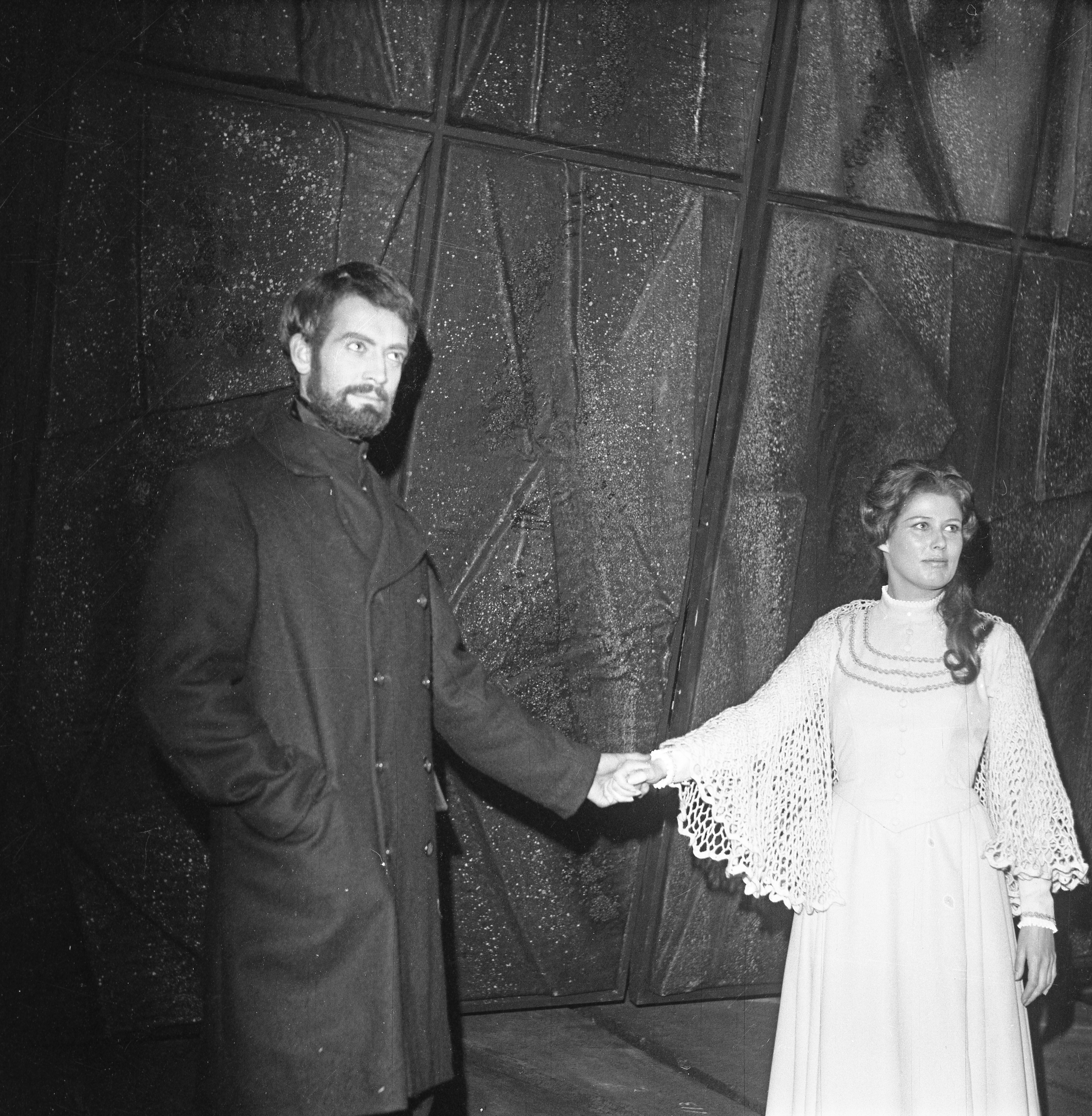
- Arne Aas and Inger Marie Andersen at the National Theater in Bergen in 1968
- Born: July 7, 1931; Oslo, Norway
- Died: April 3, 2000 (aged 68); Oslo, Norway
- Occupations: Actor, director, screenwriter
- Children: Nils Einar Aas

Arne Martin Aas (July 7, 1931 – April 3, 2000) was a Norwegian actor, director, and screenwriter that worked in theater, film, and TV.

== Theater ==
From 1970 to 1973, Aas was the theater manager at the Trøndelag Theater, where he also made his debut in 1957 in Strindberg's Erik XIV. He also had directing assignments at the theater and was employed there from 1963 onward. At the Trøndelag Theater he appeared in plays such as John Osborne's Look Back in Anger (Norwegian title: Se deg om i vrede) and William Shakespeare's Twelfth Night (Norwegian title: Helligtrekongersaften), and he performed the title role in Henrik Ibsen's Brand.

He was also associated with NRK's Television Theater (from 1966 to 1970, and again from 1973 to 1975), where he became nationally known, among other things, in the role of Hans Nilsen Fennefoss in the miniseries Skipper Worse based on the novel by Alexander Kielland. For many years, Aas was also associated with the Oslo New Theatre and, in addition to a number of comedies, he made a name for himself there in Paul Claudel's play Partage de midi (Norwegian title: Dagen vender).

From 1978 to 1983, he was a stage manager for The Saint Olav Drama in Stiklestad. For his contributions there, he received the Stiklestad Prize in 1980.

In the last years before his death, he had several guest appearances at the Nordland Theater.

== Film and TV ==
Aas made his film debut in 1964 in Alle tiders kupp, and he had a number of roles in Norwegian films in both the 1960s and 1970s. Among the most notable films are Smuglere (1968), Skulle det dukke opp flere lik er det bare å ringe (1970), and Rallarblod (1979), as well as several films in the series about the Olsen Gang.

Aas also had a number of appearances on television, including the mini-series Skipper Worse in 1968, and on several occasions together with Rolv Wesenlund in the series Fleksnes Fataliteter. From the Fleksnes series, he is perhaps best remembered for his role as the brother-in-law "Rødhette" in the classic episode "Rotbløyte" from 1981, and as a hysterical doctor in the episode "Det går altigt et tog" from 1974. Arne Aas had his last role on TV in the short film Operasjon Popcorn in 1998.

== Filmography ==
- 1964: Alle tiders kupp as Thorsen, Mette's boyfriend
- 1964: Pappa tar gull as Wollert, the prophet
- 1965: To på topp as the chief mate
- 1965: Vaktpostene as Arild, a soldier
- 1967: Musikanter as Ludvig, a poet
- 1968: Smuglere as Hugo
- 1968: Bare et liv – historien om Fridtjof Nansen as Philip Noel-Baker
- 1969: Himmel og helvete as Orheim, a psychologist and advocate for free drugs
- 1970: Exit
- 1970: Skulle det dukke opp flere lik er det bare å ringe as Robert Westerlie
- 1971: 3 as the boss
- 1973: Kanarifuglen as Arne, a workmate
- 1974: Bobbys krig as the director
- 1974: Under en steinhimmel as the doctor
- 1975: Min Marion as Leonid
- 1976: Oss as the minister of finance
- 1978: Olsenbanden + Data-Harry sprenger verdensbanken as Larsen, a driving instructor
- 1979: Kronprinsen as the editor
- 1979: Olsenbanden og Dynamitt-Harry mot nye høyder as Brock-Larsen, a financier
- 1979: Rallarblod as the engineer

== Television roles ==
- 1968: Det lykkelige valg (Television Theater)
- 1968: Lille Eyolf as Borghejm (Television Theater)
- 1968: Skipper Worse as Hans Nilsen Fennefos (miniseries and Television Theater)
- 1970: Kjemp for alt hva du har kjært (Television Theater)
- 1974: Fleksnes Fataliteter, episode "Det går alltid et tog" as the hysterical doctor in a train compartment (series)
- 1982: Fleksnes Fataliteter, episode "Rotbløyte" as Rødhette, the brother-in-law from the navy (series)
- 1988: Fleksnes Fataliteter, episode "Her har jeg mitt liv" as the hysterical doctor at the Pearly Gates (series)
- 1992: Dødelig kjemi as Kristoffer (miniseries)
- 1993: Morsarven as the commissioner (miniseries)
- 1998: Operasjon popcorn (short film)
