= Svein Wickstrøm =

Norwegian actor (1936–2006)

- Born: March 17, 1936; Oslo, Norway
- Died: December 15, 2006 (aged 70); Trondheim, Norway
- Occupation: Actor
- Awards: Per Aabel Honorary Award (1985)

Svein Wickstrøm (March 17, 1936 – December 15, 2006) was a Norwegian actor and revue artist. He was employed at the Trøndelag Theater for 35 years.

Wickstrøm was born in Oslo. He made his stage debut with Leif Juster at the Edderkoppen Theater in 1955. After training at the National Theater School, he spent two years with the National Traveling Theater and then five years at Chat Noir. In 1968 he started performing at the Trøndelag Theater, and he remained there until he retired in 2003.

Together with Helle Ottesen and Jakob Margido Esp, he performed in the cabaret show Store Lille Otto, which was staged around 200 times. This performance came in several versions, called Store lille Trondhjem and finally Store lille verden in the 1990s. He appeared in three episodes of the comedy series Fleksnes Fataliteter, and he is particularly remembered for his role as "Bed Rail" (Norwegian: Sengehesten) in the episode "Rotbløyte" from 1982.

Wickstrøm was a regular panelist in the radio program 20 spørsmål (20 Questions), which aired locally in Trøndelag in the 1990s. Wickstrøm played over 150 characters in theater, revue, film, radio, and TV.

In 1985 he received the Per Aabel Honorary Award, and in 1996 he was awarded the Trøndelag Theater Friends' Honorary Award. He received the Norwegian Association of Theater Directors grant in 1966 and the city of Trondheim's cultural grant in 1971.

== Filmography ==
- 1961: Går ut i kveld as Horne (NRK Television Theater)
- 1965: Vaktpostene as Carl, a member of the military police
- 1966: Kontorsjef Tangen (TV series)
- 1967: Musikanter
- 1968: De ukjentes marked as David
- 1968: Mannen som ikke kunne le
- 1968: Smuglere
- 1982: Fleksnes fataliteter in the episode "Rotbløyte" as "Bed Rail" (Sengehesten)
- 1976: Fleksnes fataliteter in the episode "Trafikk og panikk" as the spokesman for Falken
- 1985: Hustruer - ti år etter as the travel agent
- 1985: Papirfuglen as the undertaker
- 1987: På stigende kurs as the banker
- 2002: Fleksnes fataliteter in the episode "Himmelen kan vente" as the angel
