= Bonne Gauguin =

Norwegian actress and dance instructor

- Born: November 28, 1910; Kristiania (now Oslo), Norway
- Died: July 12, 1989 (aged 78); Oslo, Norway
- Occupation(s): Actress, dance instructor
- Spouse: Paul René Gauguin

Bonne Gauguin (born Ingeborg Kathrine Winther-Hjelm Jelstrup, November 28, 1910 – July 12, 1989) was a Norwegian actress and dance instructor.

Gauguin trained as a dance teacher in Germany. In the 1930s she moved to Trondheim and made her debut at the Trøndelag Theater. In 1941 she married the visual artist Paul René Gauguin, who was a set designer at the Unge Trøndelag Theater from 1939 to 1945. In 1946 they moved to Oslo, where she got a job at the Studio Theater. The couple divorced before 1950. When the Studio Theater closed down, she started working at the National Traveling Theater, and she also worked at the People's Theater and to a lesser extent at the Norwegian Theater, NRK's Radio Theater and Television Theater, and in Norwegian films. Among her last theatrical appearances was as the teacher in Grease under the direction of Stein Winge in 1984.

Gauguin was the daughter of the architect Thomas Krenkel Jelstrup (1863–1917) and Emilie Constanse "Milly" (née Winter-Hjelm) (1876–1955).

== Filmography ==
- 1952: Det kunne vært deg as Mrs. Westberg
- 1953: Skøytekongen
- 1958: Ut av mørket
- 1959: Jakten
- 1960: Ungen as Gurina Neger (NRK Television Theater)
- 1961: Bussen
- 1963: Om Tilla
- 1966: Reisen til havet as Johanne
- 1969: Brent jord as the grandmother
- 1970: Balladen om mestertyven Ole Høiland as Mrs. Konsmo
- 1970: Love Is War as the grandmother
- 1970: Operasjon V for vanvidd as Mrs. Philipson
- 1970: Selma Brøter (NRK Television Theater)
- 1971: Rødblått paradis
- 1973: Brannen as a woman
- 1973: Kanarifuglen
- 1974: Fleksnes Fataliteter: Biovita Helsesenter as a patient at a health clinic (TV series)
- 1977: Åpenbaringen (film) as the mother
- 1977: Helmer & Sigurdson: Solospill as Molly Smith (TV miniseries)
- 1988: Fleksnes Fataliteter: Her har jeg mitt liv as a patient at a health clinic (TV series)
