= Elisabeth Reiss =

Norwegian pianist and cabaret performer (1902–1970)

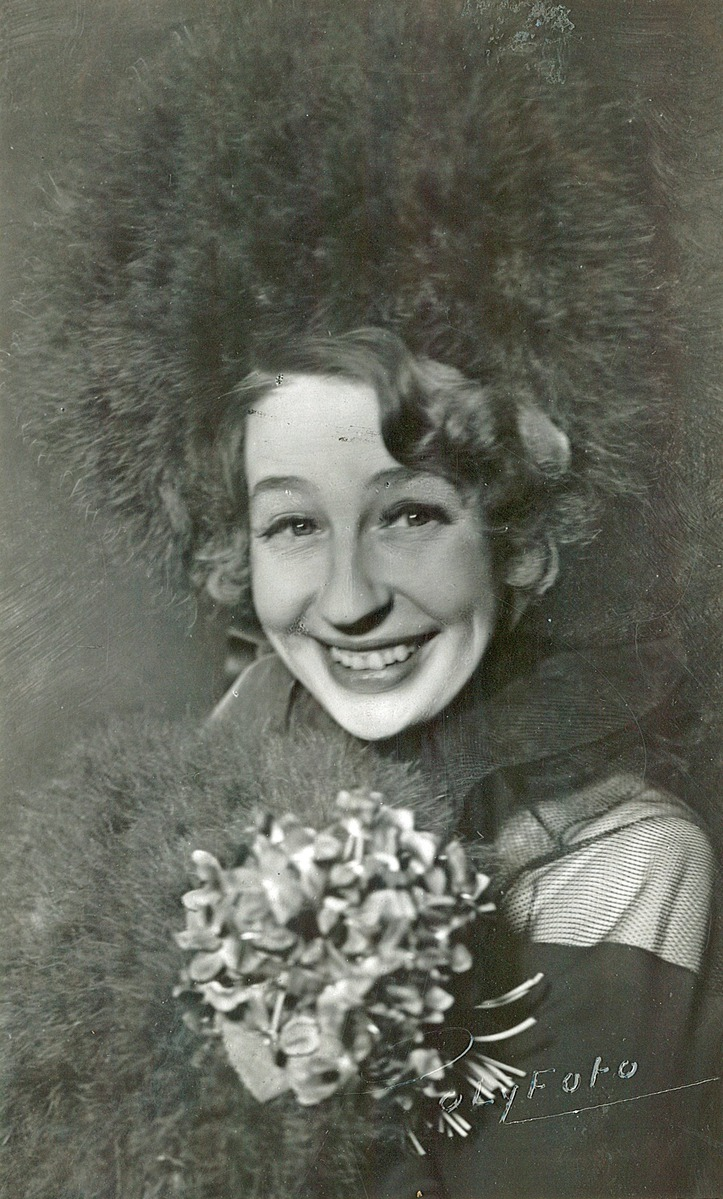
- Born: June 14, 1902; Kristiania (now Oslo), Norway
- Died: March 8, 1970 (aged 67); Lillehammer, Norway
- Occupations: Pianist and cabaret performer
- Father: Georg Reiss
- Relatives: Thorleif Reiss; Helge Reiss

Aasta Elisabeth Reiss (June 14, 1902 – March 8, 1970) was a Norwegian pianist and cabaret performer. She was the daughter of the lawyer, composer, and musicologist Georg Reiss and the sister of the actor Thorleif Reiss.

== Classical pianist ==
Elisabeth Reiss took early lessons from an influential piano teacher of her time, Nils Larsen, who taught her for free because of her great talent. He gave her the following graduation certificate in 1919:

Miss Elisabeth Reiss has been my student for over three years. In 1916, she could barely play a Mozart sonata. In 1917 she publicly played Mozart's D major Concerto (the Coronation Concerto), and in 1918—also publicly—Beethoven's Piano Concerto No. 4 in G major. This illustrates her progress and her ability to work. She is an absolutely excellent Bach player, and she has distinct abilities and a keen sense of modern music and its refined sound effects. For example, compositions by Reger and others. She is versatile and not just "gifted at the piano"—and I would describe her as a radiant talent.

She made her piano debut in 1917 in the Great Hall at Gamle Logen with Mozart's Piano Concerto No. 5 in D major concerto (K. 175) with the National Theater's orchestra, conducted by Gustav Fredrik Lange, and the following year she performed Beethoven's Piano Concerto No. 4 in G major with a full orchestra. In 1920 she received a scholarship for studies in Paris and Vienna, and back in Norway she took classes with Bokken Lasson in the cabaret style, while she continued to give piano concerts to very good reviews, especially for her performances of works by Max Reger, Maurice Ravel, and Claude Debussy.

After a concert in 1928 with the Oslo Philharmonic, with Odd Grüner-Hegge debuting as conductor, Harald Sæverud wrote the following about Reiss in Aftenposten:

It was in the best understanding with the composer that the young lady led the way in this interplay between brilliant melodies and cheerful rhythms, well supported by the orchestra and conductor.

== Cabaret artist ==
Elisabeth Reiss developed her own style, and in 1937 she surprised audiences by debuting for the second time, this time with her own solo cabaret act. The theater director Bjørn Bjørnson wrote immediately afterward in the Oslo press:

I feel compelled to publicly comment on the artistic event that I experienced the other evening. What Elisabeth Reiss showed us in her art, the improvisation, the responsiveness, which received an outstanding interpretation through her, represents a completely new genre on stage in the Scandinavian countries.

Reiss herself wrote a number of the highly satirical texts for the show, based on current situations and social debate. In this sense, her lyrics provide good images of the times. Other contributors to the texts included Johan Borgen, Vilhelm Dybwad, André Bjerke, Inger Hagerup, Alf Hartmann, Thorleif Reiss, and Piet Hein. Hein gave Elisabeth Reiss the following well-known Kumbel grook as an item for her performance in 1952:

Den som kun tar spøk for spøk
og alvor kun alvorlig
han og hun har faktisk fattet
begge dele dårlig.

Those who take jokes only as jokes
And seriousness only as serious
He and she have an understanding
Of both that is spurious.

Among composers, she received contributions from figures such as Pauline Hall, Kåre Siem, and Finn Ludt. The performances were carried out at a high pace, with comedy and constant role changes. Reiss was both inspired by and had a lot in common with Victor Borge, and she became one of the forerunners of today's stand-up style.
