= Frimann Falck Clausen =

Norwegian actor (1921–1983)

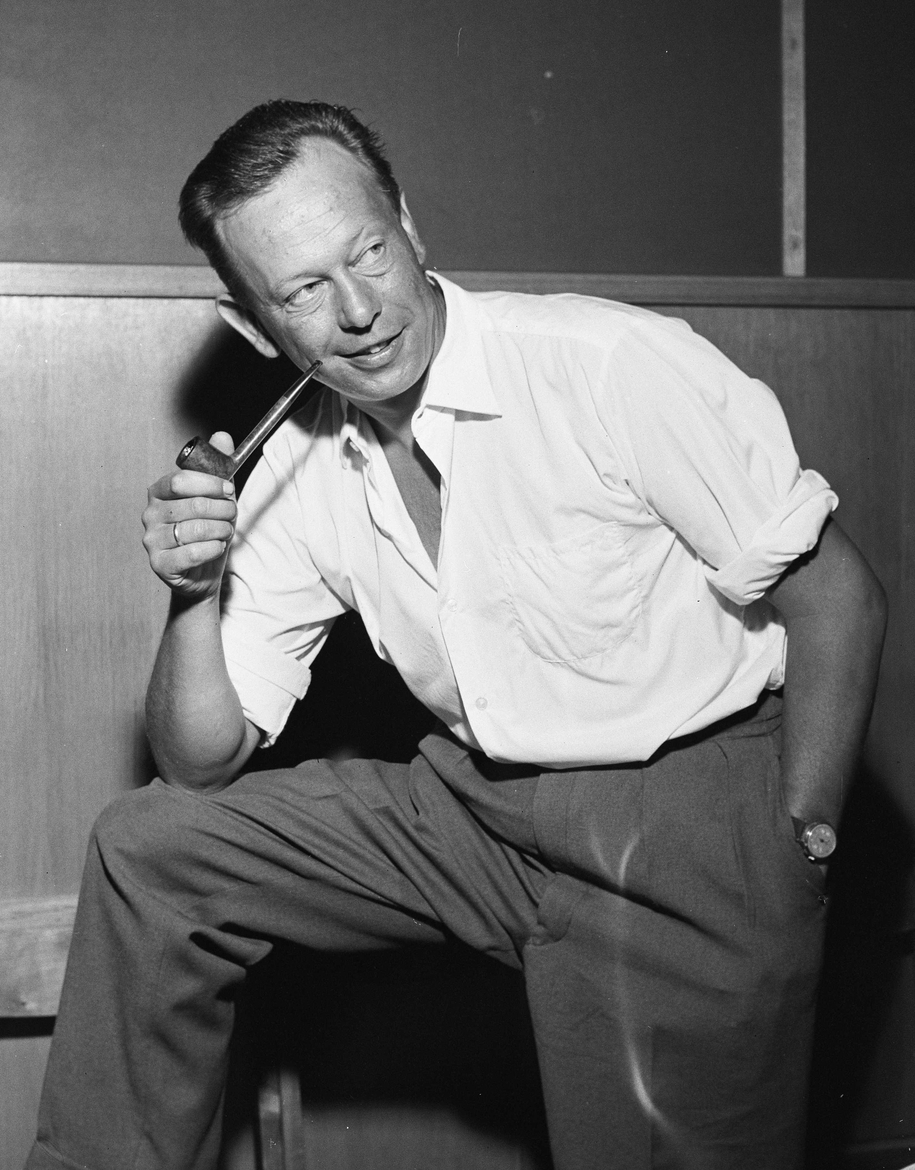
- Frimann Falck Clausen in 1959
- Born: February 15, 1921; Drammen, Norway
- Died: March 23, 1983 (aged 62); Oslo, Norway
- Occupation: Actor
- Spouse: Anne-Lise Tangstad (m. 1958)

Frimann Falck Clausen (February 15, 1921 – March 23, 1983) was a Norwegian actor. He played the role of the truck owner Hjul in the children's series Jul i Skomakergata in 1979 and the wealthy farmer Torsøien in the Norwegian film comedy Bør Børson Jr. and its sequel.

Clausen started his acting career at the Frater Theater in Drammen, where he took part in both revues and theater productions. Later he moved to Oslo, where he performed at several theaters, among them the Norwegian Theater, Oslo New Theater, and National Theatre. He also took part in several productions of NRK's Television Theater.

In 1958, Clausen married the actress Anne-Lise Tangstad. Clausen died in 1983. He was cremated at the Vestre crematorium in Oslo and buried in Bragernes cemetery in Drammen.

== Filmography ==
- 1951: Ukjent mann as the second officer
- 1965: Vaktpostene as the actor
- 1966: Nederlaget as Brunel (Television Theater)
- 1966: Reisen til havet as the sheriff
- 1966: Sult as a police officer
- 1968: Rommet as Bert (Television Theater)
- 1968: Smuglere
- 1969: Huset på grensen as a captain in the engineer troops (TV)
- 1970: Balladen om mestertyven Ole Høiland as Sheriff Nielsen
- 1970: Døden i gatene
- 1970: En dag i Ivan Denisovitsj' liv as Senka
- 1972: Fleksnes Fataliteter, the episode "Blodgiveren" as the elderly man in the waiting room (TV series)
- 1972: Lukket avdeling as Paul Paulus Knutsen
- 1973: Brannen as the boss
- 1974: Bobbys krig as the hotelier
- 1974: Bør Børson Jr. as Torsøien
- 1974: Fleksnes Fataliteter, the episode "Det går alltid et tog" as the priest in a train compartment (TV series)
- 1974: Ransom as Schmidt
- 1974: Ungen as the doctor
- 1976: Bør Børson II as Torsøien
- 1977: Karjolsteinen as Jens Heimdal
- 1977: Solospill as Jens Asplund (miniseries)
- 1979: Jul i Skomakergata as the truck owner Juel Hjul (televised advent calendar)
