= Nils Larsen (pianist) =

Norwegian pianist and composer (1888–1937)

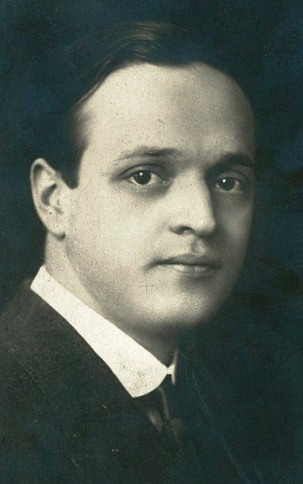

Background information
- Born: June 7, 1888; Kristiania
- Died: November 5, 1937 (aged 49)
- Instrument: Piano
- Years active: 1908–1924

Nils Larsen (June 7, 1888 – November 5, 1937) was a Norwegian pianist, composer, and pedagogue. He was one of Norway's leading pianists before the Second World War and was an influential promoter of Norwegian piano performance.

Larsen was born in Kristiania (now Oslo). As a young man he studied under Martin Knutzen from 1906 to 1909. He made his debut as a composer with four works in 1908 and as a pianist at the Gamle Logen concert hall in 1909. In Berlin he studied under José Vianna da Motta and Rudolph Ganz from 1910 to 1914. He spent time in the United States from 1919 to 1920, and he toured Norway with the violinist Leif Halvorsen with great success until his last concert, on January 15, 1924. During this time he produced several compositions; these are smaller pieces that are still used in teaching.

Larsen was also affiliated with the Oslo Philharmonic and he operated the Nils Larsen Piano School (Norwegian: Nils Larsens klaverskole) at Parkveien 75 in Oslo. He taught over forty students until their debuts. Among his students were Robert Levin, Robert Riefling, Reimar Riefling, Tore Sinding, Elisabeth Reiss, Eline Nygaard, Kristian Hauger, Sølvi Wang, Gunvor Mjelva, Ester Skogsrud, Ruth Lagesen, Ingebjørg Gresvik, Hans Solum, Hildegunn Reuter, Kåre Siem, Klaus Egge, Johan Øian, and Ivar Johnsen. After his early death, responsibility for the piano school was taken over by his former student Ingebjørg Gresvik.

== Publications ==
- Bøljan blå, sjømannsviser og bygdesanger med musikk (The Blue Wave: Sailor Tunes and Village Songs with Music, 1930)
