= Waadeland =

Waadeland is a Norwegian surname. Notable people with the surname include:

- Carl Haakon Waadeland (born 1952), Norwegian musician and musicologist
- Gudrun Waadeland (1937–2020), Norwegian actress and theatre director
