= Georg Reiss =

Norwegian lawyer, composer, and musicologist (1861–1914)

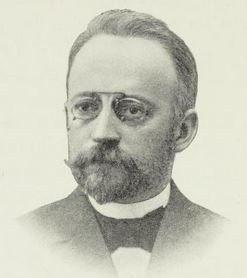
- Born: August 12, 1861; Kristiania (now Oslo), Norway
- Died: January 25, 1914 (aged 52)
- Occupations: Lawyer, composer, and musicologist
- Children: Thorleif Reiss; Elisabeth Reiss
- Relatives: Helge Reiss

Georg Michael Dødelein Reiss (August 12, 1861 – January 25, 1914) was a Norwegian lawyer, composer, and musicologist. In 1913 he became the first Norwegian to receive a doctorate on a music theory subject.

== Career ==
Reiss was trained as a lawyer; he received his candidate of law degree in 1886, and he started working as a secretary in the Ministry of Culture and Church Affairs in 1899. He was a pupil of Ludvig Mathias Lindeman, Otto Winter-Hjelm, and Christian Cappelen. Later he also studied at the Academy of Music in Berlin. He was organist at Saint Peter's Church (since 1962 Sofienberg Church) in Kristiania from 1893 to 1914, and he was a music reviewer for Dagbladet from 1893 to 1896, for Nordisk Musikrevue from 1903 to 1906, and for Verdens Gang from 1904 onward. Reiss himself wrote a church cantata in 1902, and other compositions for voice and choir, including an eight-part kyrie.

With support from the Nansen Foundation and as a government scholar starting in 1908, Reiss studied neume notation, paleography, and medieval music theory, published manuscripts from the National Archives, worked on two sequences for Saint Olav, and received a PhD in 1913 with his dissertation Musiken ved den middelalderlige Olavsdyrkelse i Norden (Music in the Medieval Olav Cult in the Nordic Countries), which was Norway's first doctorate in music history.

== Family ==
Georg Reiss was the son of the music teacher Hans Peter Reiss (1824–1908) and Petronelle Cornelia Hansen (1832–1879). Georg Reiss married Elisabeth Dymling (1861–1920), a merchant's daughter, in Vänersborg in 1893. They were the parents of the actor Thorleif Reiss and the pianist and cabaret performer Elisabeth Reiss. Georg Reiss was the grandfather of the actor Helge Reiss.

== Works ==
- 1900: Drei Lieder in altern Stile für gemischten Chor a capella: Op. 3. Christiania: Haakon Zapffe.
- 1908: Det norske rigsarkivs middelalderlige musikhaandskrifter: en oversigt. Christiania: Dybwad.
- 1912: Musiken ved den middelalderlige Olavsdyrkelse i Norden. Kristiania: I kommission hos J. Dybwad. (Dissertation)
