= Anne-Lise Tangstad =

Norwegian actress (1935–1981)

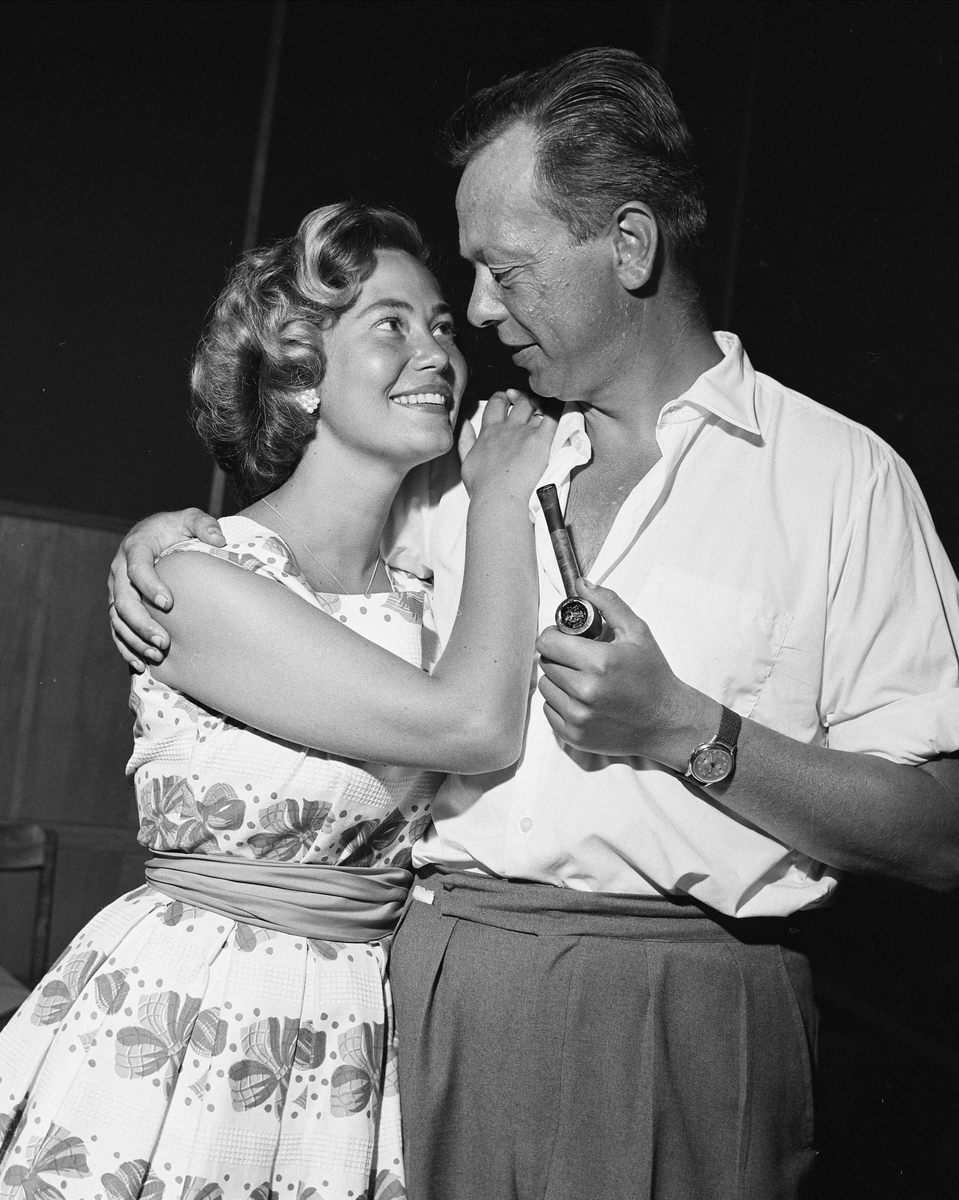
- Anne-Lise Tangstad and her husband Frimann Falck Clausen in 1959
- Born: February 6, 1935; Aker, Oslo, Norway
- Died: December 13, 1981 (aged 46); Oslo, Norway
- Occupation: Actress
- Spouse: Frimann Falck Clausen (m. 1958)

Anne-Lise Tangstad Clausen (February 6, 1935 – December 13, 1981) was a Norwegian actress.

== Biography ==
Tangstad made her debut in 1954 in the musical South Pacific at the Central Theater, where she later worked from 1957 to 1958. After that she was at the People's Theater (Folketeatret) from 1958 to 1959 and at the Oslo New Theater from 1959 to 1970, after which she worked freelance. On the stage, she particularly made a name for herself as Sofia in Anton Chekhov's Platanov, Hazel in Eugene O'Neill's Mourning Becomes Electra, Helen in Shakespeare's Twelfth Night, Mrs. Krane in Kranes konditori, and Guriana in Oskar Braaten's Ungen.

She also appeared in a number of films, and in 1958 she played the leading role in the film I slik en natt as a young doctor who is at the head of a rescue operation in which the children of a Jewish orphanage in Oslo are saved from the Gestapo during the Second World War. She also played one of the two main roles in Før frostnettene (1965). Tangstad is also particularly remembered for Brent jord (1969), Skulle det dukke opp flere lik er det bare å ringe (1970), and Den sommeren jeg fylte 15 (1976), as well as several films about the Olsen Gang. On television, she appeared in the miniseries Nitimemordet, the series Benoni og Rosa, and two episodes of Fleksnes Fataliteter ("Visittid" 1972 and "Trafikk & Panikk" 1974). She also provided the voice of Maid Marian in the Norwegian-language version of the animated film Robin Hood.

In 1958, she married the actor Frimann Falck Clausen.

== Filmography ==
- 1957: Smuglere i smoking as Eva
- 1958: I slik en natt as Liv Kraft
- 1959: Herren og hans tjenere as Agnes Helmer
- 1964: Husmorfilmen høsten 1964
- 1966: Før frostnettene as Vera Boye
- 1966: Reisen til havet as the supervisor
- 1968: Smuglere
- 1969: Brent jord as Alma, Heikki's wife
- 1970: Skulle det dukke opp flere lik er det bare å ringe as Vera Marthinsen
- 1970: Tyven, tyven ... as Anna
- 1972: Lukket avdeling
- 1972: Olsenbanden tar gull as Carina, the blacksmith's daughter
- 1973: Olsenbanden og Dynamitt-Harry går amok as the office lady
- 1974: Bobbys krig as Mother Courage
- 1974: Olsenbanden møter Kongen & Knekten as the supreme court lawyer's wife
- 1976: Den sommeren jeg fylte 15 as Aunt Linn
- 1977: Karjolsteinen as the midwife
- 1977: Olsenbanden og Dynamitt-Harry på sporet as the company secretary
- 1981: Liten Ida as the organist
- 1981: Olsenbanden gir seg aldri! as the secretary at TeamFinans
- 1982: For Tors skyld as Laila's mother
