= Scobbie =

Scobbie is a surname. Notable people with the surname include:

- Iain Scobbie, British expert in international law
- Tam Scobbie (born 1988), Scottish footballer

== See also ==
- Scobie
