= Skulle det dukke opp flere lik er det bare å ringe =

Skulle det dukke opp flere lik, er det bare å ringe
- Directed by: Knut Bohwim
- Written by: Jon Lennart Mjøen
- Based on: Jack Popplewell's play Busybody
- Produced by: Anne Vennerød
- Starring: Aud Schønemann; Arve Opsahl; Arne Aas; Carsten Byhring; Thorleif Reiss; Jorunn Kjellsby
- Cinematography: Mattis Mathiesen
- Edited by: Reidar Lund; Olav Engebretsen
- Music by: Egil Monn-Iversen
- Distributed by: EMI Produksjon
- Release date: March 2, 1970
- Running time: 98 minutes
- Country: Norway
- Language: Norwegian

Skulle det dukke opp flere lik er det bare å ringe (If Any More Bodies Should Turn Up, Just Call) is a Norwegian crime comedy from 1970 directed by Knut Bohwim. The film stars Arve Opsahl and Aud Schønemann. The film is based on a popular theater production from 1968 with the same cast as in the film. The stage play was a translation of Jack Popplewell's British play Busybody, from 1964.

== Plot ==
A murder has occurred in the building where Lilly lives, and Lilly discovers the body and calls the police. According to Lilly, the victim is the head of a company on the top floor, and his name is Mr. Marthinsen. He also owns a farm. When Constable Jeremias P. Grodahl, played by Helge Reiss, arrives, the body has disappeared. The constable doesn't believe anything in particular about Lilly, and when Bakker arrives he is annoyed at having been dragged out of bed with a fever to get to a crime scene where the body has disappeared. However, Bakker and Lilly are old acquaintances, and were apparently quite intimate at the Rosekjeller'n in the good old days. So when she wants to talk about the old days, and Bakker about the murder that supposedly happened, it won't be easy. Blood was found on the chair and Mr. Marthinsen never came home that evening. Bakker must then, to his great disappointment, actually investigate a possible murder. It all ends with Bakker gathering Mr. Marthinsen's entire staff in Mr. Marthinsen's office to identify a possible murderer. Who did it, is Mr. Marthinsen dead, or has the victim not yet been named?

== Screening ==
Skulle det dukke opp flere lik er det bare å ringe became one of the most watched Norwegian films in cinemas in 1970. The film was first shown on NRK on December 26, 1976, and it has been broadcast a number of times since then.

== Cast ==
- Arve Opsahl as Superintendent Henry Bakker
- Aud Schønemann as Lilly Hansen
- Carsten Byhring as Freddy Hansen
- Helge Reiss as Jeremias P. Grodahl
- Sissel Sellæg as Miss Selbye
- Jorunn Kjellsby as Vigdis Reiestad
- Arne Aas as Robert Westerlie
- Thorleif Reiss as Direktor Marthinsen
- Anne-Lise Tangstad as Vera Marthinsen
- Sverre Wilberg as a police officer
