= Sinding =

Sinding is a surname. Notable people with the surname include:

- Christian Sinding (1856–1941), Norwegian composer
- Otto Sinding (1842–1909), Norwegian painter
- Stephan Sinding (1846–1922), Norwegian sculptor, brother of Christian and Otto
- Tore Sinding (1903–1969), Norwegian pianist and composer
