= Gunnar Sønstevold =

Norwegian composer (1912–1991)

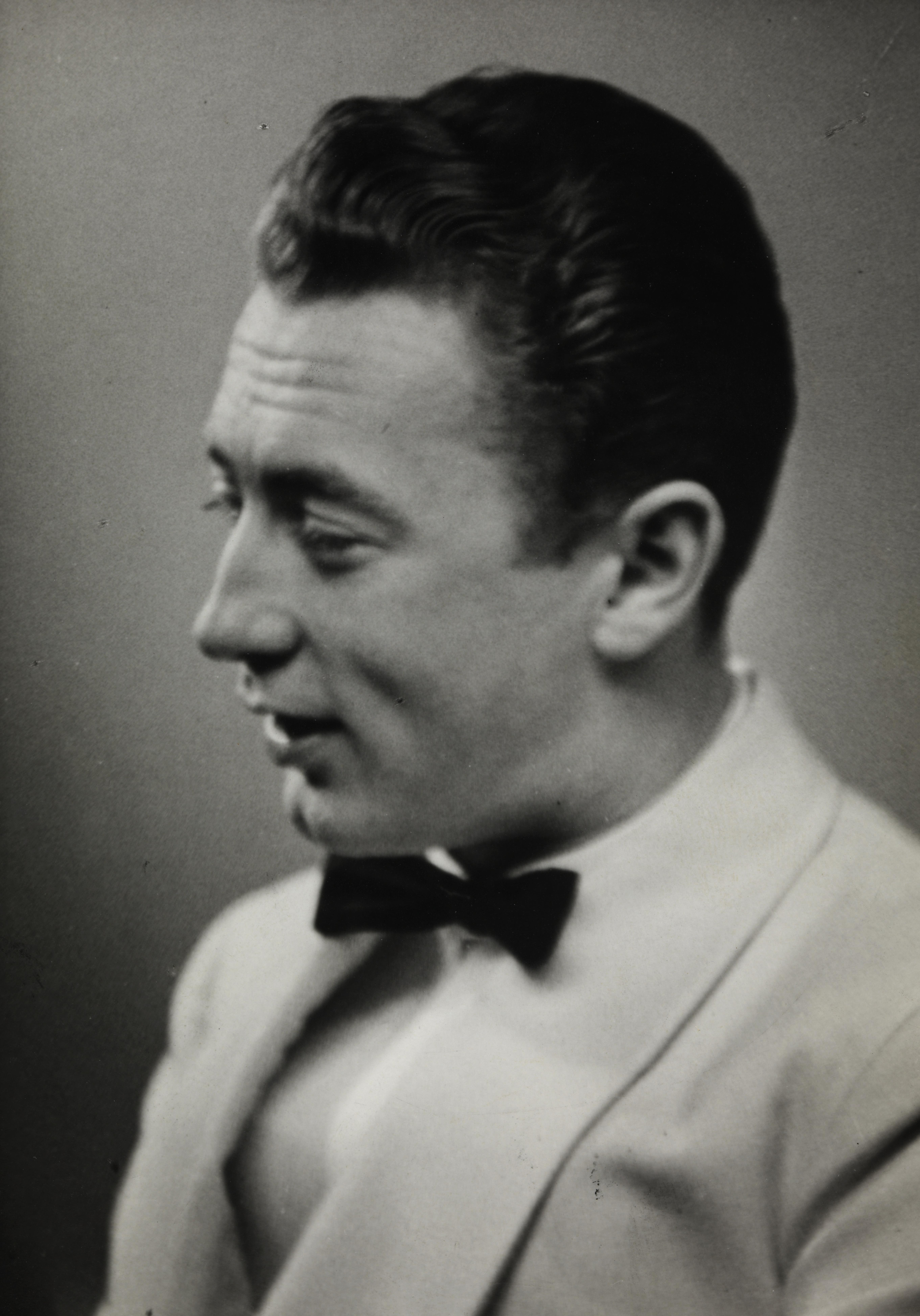
- Born: 26 November 1912; Elverum, Norway
- Died: 18 October 1991 (aged 78)
- Occupation: Composer
- Spouse: Maj Sønstevold (m. 1941)

Gunnar Sønstevold (26 November 1912 – 18 October 1991) was a Norwegian composer. He was born in Elverum Municipality, and married composer Maj Sønstevold in 1941. He composed orchestral works, vocal music, chamber music, and music to a number of plays, ballets and films. He headed the Music Department of the Norwegian Broadcasting Corporation/Television from 1966 to 1974. He was awarded Filmkritikerprisen in 1955, for the film Det brenner i natt!. He received the Arts Council Norway music prize in 1972, and Radioteatret's honorary prize in 1987.

== Career ==
Sønstevold studied music in Oslo, beginning in 1932 with piano studies with Nils Larsen and Erling Westher as well as composition studies with Karl Andersen. Parallel to his studies, Sønstevold played piano and trombone in one of the leading jazz quartet of the era: Funny Boys (1932–39). After the outbreak of World War II, Sønstevold fled to Sweden where he subsequently met the composer Maj Lundén whom he married in 1941.

From 1946 to 1969, Sønstevold composed music for 40 motion pictures and three full-length documentaries. As a theatre composer, Sønstevold penned the score for Jens Bjørneboe’s Semmelweis, Henrik Ibsen’s Catalina, Tarjei Vesaas’ Bleikeplassen as well as Georg Büchner’s Woyzek. When Sønstevold composed the music for Det Norske Teatret’s 1957 performance of William Shakespeare’s The Tempest, he was one of the first Norwegian composers to utilize electronic elements in his music.

== Production ==
=== Selected works ===
==== Orchestral works ====
- Sinfonietta (1949)
- Concerto for saxophone and orchestra (1955)
- Concerto for flute, trombone and orchestra (1965)
- Forvandling: En fleip (1976)
- Concerto for oboe, harp and orchestra (1978)
- Kork (= Kringkastingsorkesteret) (1979)
- Festkommentate (1981)
- Concertino for harp and orchestra (1991)

==== Vocal works ====
- Intermezzo for soprano, violin and tape (1958)
- 5 Sanger til dikt av Tarjei Vesaas, soprano and guitar (1964)
- Litani i Atlanta (text: W. E. B. du Bois, Norwegian texts: Paal Helge Haugen), choir, children's choir, jazz ensemble, orchestra (1971)
- Fredskjemperens død for choir and chamber ensemble (1978)
- Forhandlinger i et magert land for choir and chamber ensemble (1982)

==== Chamber music ====
- String Quartet No. 1 (1945)
- Duett for flute and oboe (1949)
- Det doriske bur for 3 pianists playing 1 piano (1964)
- Duett for harp and tuba (1970)
- Strykekvartett nr. 1, Pinter-kvartetten (1971/77)
- PianoPussel for to (1974)
- Samvirke, septet (1976)
- Crico (1977)
- Quintessens for chamber ensemble (1979)
- Sonatine for trombone and piano (1990)

==== Film music ====
- Reisen til havet (1966)
- Vaktpostene (1965)
- Klokker i måneskinn (1964)
- Om Tilla (1963)
- Omringet (1960)
- De dødes tjern (1958)
- Fjols til fjells (1957)
- Selkvinnen (1953)
- Veslefrikk med fela (1952)
- Musikk på loftet/En dukkedrøm (1952)
- Ukjent mann (1951)
- Vi flyr på Rio (1949)
- Den hemmelighetsfulle leiligheten (1948)

==== Music for stage productions ====
- Bendik og Årolija, ballet (1947)
- Musikalsk spectacel, ballet over Peer Gynt (1966)
- Koreografen, ballet (1967)
- Innberetning til et akademi (text: Franz Kafka) (1982/87)

=== Discography ===
- Elin & Egil, Dans med Prøysen - Greieste hits 2 (2007)
- Alexandra Becker, Rolf Becker, Dickie Dick Dickens - fjerde serie: Nå er han her igjen (2003)
- Alexandra Becker, Rolf Becker, Dickie Dick Dickens - tredje serie (2001)
- Alexandra Becker, Rolf Becker, Dickie Dick Dickens - andre serie (1999)
- Alexandra Becker, Rolf Becker, Dickie Dick Dickens - første serie (1998)
- Stockholm Philharmonic Wind Quintet, Elisabeth Sønstevold, Music For Wind Instruments And Harp (1994)
- Eva Knardahl, Robert Rønnes, The Norwegian Contemporary Bassoon (1992)
- Kari Svendsen, Kari går til Filmen (1991)
- Geir Henning Braaten, Norwegian Panorama (1984)
