= Axel Kielland =

Norwegian journalist, crime reporter, theatre critic and playwright

Axel Zetlitz Kielland
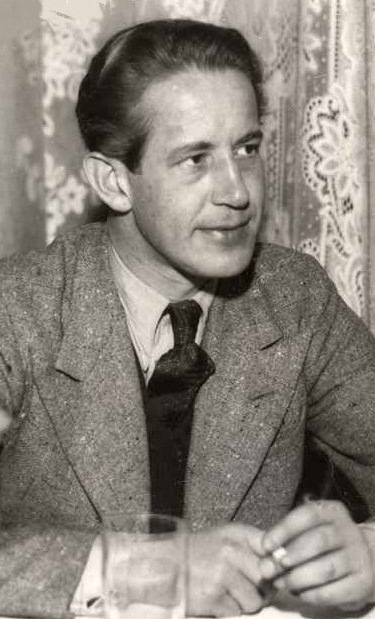
- Axel Kielland by the early 1930's
- Born: 14 February 1907; Stavanger, Norway
- Died: 25 November 1963 (aged 56); Oslo, Norway
- Occupations: Journalist and playwright
- Spouse: Sonja Mjøen (m. 1932–1946)
- Relatives: Alexander Kielland (grandfather); Fridtjof Mjøen (brother-in-law)

Axel Zetlitz Kielland (14 February 1907 – 25 November 1963) was a Norwegian journalist, crime reporter, theatre critic and playwright.

== Personal life ==
Kielland was born in Stavanger to writer Jens Zetlitz Kielland (1873–1926) and Anna Gunhilde Holst, and was a grandson of writer Alexander Kielland. He was married to actress Sonja Mjøen from 1932 to 1946, and to Agni Krein from 1947.

== Career ==
Kielland worked for the newspaper Dagbladet from 1927. Among his plays was Hvis et folk vil leve from 1943, on the German occupation of Norway. The play was prohibited by the Swedish government after German protests. His play Herren og hans tjenere from 1955 had success at several Scandinavian stages, and was basis for a 1959 film by Arne Skouen.
