= Scobie =

Scobie may refer to:

Surname

- Bradford Scobie, New York City performance artist and comedian
- Edward Scobie (1918–1996), Dominican-born journalist, magazine publisher and historian
- Eric Scobie (born 1952), Scottish/Norwegian author and journalist
- Grace Scobie (1876–1957), Australian factory inspector and women's activist
- Jack Scobie (1891–1974), Australian rules footballer
- James Scobie (1826–1854), Scottish gold miner murdered at Ballarat, Victoria, Australia
- James Scobie (horseman) (1860–1940), Australian jockey and racehorse trainer
- Jason Scobie (born 1978), American baseball player
- Jonathan Goble (1827–1897), aka Jonathan Scobie, American Baptist missionary in Yokohama
- Margaret Scobie (born 1948), Australian indigenous Aboriginal painter
- Omid Scobie (born 1981), British journalist and author
- Robert Scobie (Australian politician, born 1831) (1831–1909)
- Robert Scobie (Australian politician, born 1848) (1848–1917)
- Ronald Scobie (1893–1969), British Army lieutenant-general
- Stephen Scobie (born 1943), Canadian poet, critic, and scholar
- Wallace Scobie (born 1934), Scottish footballer

Other

- Arthur Edward Scobie Breasley (1914–2006), Australian jockey
- Mackay John Scobie Mackenzie (1845–1901), New Zealand politician
- Scobie Malone, fictional homicide detective created by Australian novelist Jon Cleary

== See also ==
- Scobie Breasley Medal, annual jockeys award in Melbourne
