= Smuglere =

1968 film

- Directed by: Rolf Clemens
- Written by: Liv Clemens
- Based on: Arthur Omre's novel Smuglere
- Produced by: Alan Ousbey
- Starring: Elsa Lystad; Baard Owe; Arne Aas
- Cinematography: Dag Klippenberg
- Edited by: Rolf Clemens
- Distributed by: Teamfilm A/S
- Release date: September 5, 1968
- Running time: 127 minutes
- Country: Norway
- Language: Norwegian

Smuglere (The Smugglers) is a Norwegian crime film from 1968 directed by Rolf Clemens. The screenplay was written by Liv Clemens, who based it on Arthur Omre's 1935 novel of the same name.

== Plot ==
In the 1920s, the unemployed architect Ernst accidentally enters a smuggling ring, and his gray and desolate existence is replaced by a lush, brazen, and colorful world. He is in love with Klara, but she leaves him. Jenny becomes his close friend. Together with Hugo and Elsa, the pair make several smuggling trips by car, with a large—but not sufficient—profit. It is only when Ernst invests in boats that the smuggling really takes off. He operates along the entire Oslo Fjord and all the way down to Rotterdam. He is constantly pursued by police and customs officials in their infamous torpedo boats. The viewers follow Ernst to the "Battle of Bygdøy," where smugglers and police officers collide in a brutal clash.

== Cast ==
- Elsa Lystad as Jenny
- Baard Owe as Ernst
- Arne Aas as Hugo
- Wilfred Breistrand
- Carsten Byhring
- Bjarne Bø
- Frimann Falck Clausen
- Unni Evjen as Klara
- Willie Hoel
- Svein Erik Kinnerød
- Willy Kramer-Johansen
- Erling Lindahl as Toller
- Cecilie Løkkeberg
- Birger Løvaas
- Alf Malland
- Dagmar Myhrvold
- Eva Opaker
- Arve Opsahl as Karlsen, the captain
- Pål Pande-Rolfsen
- Rolf Schimpf
- Ole A. Simensen
- Henrik Anker Steen
- Anne-Lise Tangstad
- Tom Tellefsen
- Ottar Wicklund
- Svein Wickstrøm
- Sverre Wilberg
- Erik Øksnes
