= List of Fleksnes Fataliteter episodes =

This lists episodes of Fleksnes Fataliteter, a comedy series on Norwegian television.

== Series overview ==
Season	Episodes	Originally aired
1	6	1972
2	6	1974
3	6	1976
4	6	1981
5	5	1982
6	10	1988
7	1	1995
8	1	2002

== Season 1 ==
Title	Original title or Rough Translation (in brackets)	Episode
"Fysiske fordeler"	The New Nose	1
Marve contemplates a nose job.
"Blodgiveren"	The Blood Donor	2
Marve goes to the doctor to donate blood.
"I heisen"	The Lift	3
Marve's lift stops between two floors, and he takes it upon himself to "occupy" the other passengers.
"Visittid"	Comedy Playhouse. Visiting Day	4
Marve is in hospital and his parents come to visit.
"Evig din for alltid"	Comedy Playhouse. Sealed with a Loving Kiss	5
Marve travels to Drammen to meet a girl.
"Vinterferie"	[Winter Holiday]	6
Marve goes to Austria to meet ladies, but ends up in prison.

== Season 2 ==
Title	Original title or Rough Translation (in brackets)	Episode
"Beklager, teknisk feil"	The Set That Failed	1
Marve's TV breaks down.
"Trafikk og panikk"	Comedy Playhouse. Impasse	2
Marve considers himself a master of his car.
"Det går alltid et tog"	The Train Journey	3
Marve travels by train, and converses with the other passengers, who do not particularly appreciate this.
"Biovita Helsesenter"	[Comedy Playhouse. The Handyman]	4
Marve gets a job at Biovita Health Center, and grabs the opportunity to earn a quick buck by selling food to the "inmates".
"Når hver tar sin"	Succession - Son And Heir	5
Marve needs a son to carry on his proud name, but there's just one problem: One needs a woman to get a son.
"Ensom"	The Bedsitter	6
Marve spends some quality time alone.

== Season 3 ==
Title	Original title or Rough Translation (in brackets)	Episode
"En ulykke hender så lett"	Dawson's Weekly. Accident Prone	1
Marve goes by motorcycle to Gothenburg. After an accident he is sent to a local hospital. Featuring Sten-Åke Cederhök and Magnus Härenstam.
"Penger er alt"	[Money is Everything]	2
Marve's mother brings a cousin with a need of a place to stay over, but Marve isn't a huge fan of relatives.
"Seier'n er vår"	[Victory is Ours] (The beginning of the episode is based on that of Dawson's Weekly. All Pools Day)	3
Marve goes by train to Gothenburg in order to see the World Allround Speed Skating Championship.
"Visittkortet"	[The Visiting Card]	4
Marve has given his visiting card to a Swede he once met on a holiday trip, and is suddenly visited by the Swede and his whole family. Featuring (among others) Brasse Brännström
"Ta plass! Lukk dørene!"	Dawson's Weekly. Strangers in the Night	5
Marve is going to Stockholm by train for a conference.
"Radioten"	The Radio Ham	6
Marve talks to the world by radio.

== Season 4 ==
Title	Original title	Episode
"Hjem, kjære hjem"	Don't Dilly Dally on the Way	1
Marve's mother has decided that she and Marve will move to another flat.
"Fjernkontroll og alt fritt"	The Baby Sitters	2
Marve and his mother work as babysitters.
"Det er noe som går"	The Cold	3
Marve has a cold.
"Med Liv som innsats"	The Galton & Simpson Playhouse. I Tell You It's Burt Reynolds	4
Marve insists that Liv Ullmann appeared in a film on TV at the moment.
"På topp-planet"	Comedy Playhouse. The Telephone Call	5
Marve wants to do something about the Cold War, and calls the Soviet Union.
"Dobbeltgjengeren"	The Wrong Man	6
The police asks Marve to take part in a line-up.

== Season 5 ==
Title	Original title	Episode
"Rotbløyte"	The Reunion Party	1
Marve invites some friends from his military service to a party.
"Høyt henger vi"	The Galton & Simpson Playhouse. Car Along The Pass	2
Marve and his mother are stuck in a cable car with some foreign tourists.
"Villmarkens sønn"	A Holiday in Scotland	3
Marve goes with his mother to solitary cabin in the mountains to live closer to the nature and lose some weight.
"Tryggere kan ingen være"	Dawson's Weekly. A Clerical Error	4
Marve volunteers to babysit a clergyman's four children.
"Bare vi to?"	Comedy Playhouse. The Last Man on Earth	5
Marve and his mother wake up one morning to find that everybody else in Oslo has disappeared.

== Season 6 ==
Title	Original title or Rough Translation (in brackets)	Episode
"Ja da – vi elsker!"	[Yes, We're in Love]	1
Marve tries to stop his mother from remarrying.
"Her har jeg mitt liv"	[This is My Life]	2
Marve wakes up at the Pearly Gates, where St. Peter looks at episodes from Marve's life (and extracts from earlier episodes are shown).
"Blodgiveren '88"	[The Blood Donor '88]	3
Marve shows St. Peter what happened when Marve went to donate blood.
"Ensom '88"	[The Bedsitter '88]	4
Marve shows St. Peter what happened when Marve had to celebrate Easter alone.
"På topp-planet '88"	[Comedy Playhouse. The Telephone Call '88]	5
Marve shows St. Peter what happened when Marve tried to stop the Cold War.
"Rotbløyte '88"	[The Reunion Party '88]	6
Marve tries to convince St. Peter that people can change by showing St. Peter what happened when Marve invited some friends from Marve's military service to a party.
"Radioten '88"	[The Radio Ham '88]	7
Marve shows St. Peter that he once tried to help somebody by radio.
"Det går alltid et tog - ta plass! '88"	[The Train Journey - Dawson's Weekly. Strangers in the Night '88]	8
Marve shows St. Peter what happened when Marve went to Sweden by train.
"Høyt henger vi '88"	[The Galton & Simpson Playhouse. Car Along The Pass '88]	9
Marve shows St. Peter what happened when Marve and his mother were stuck in a cable car with some foreign tourists.
"En siste sjanse"	[A Last Chance]	10
St. Peter finally passes judgment on Marve.

== Season 7 ==
Title	Original title	Episode
"Morderen som forsvant"	The Missing Page	1
Marve finds that the final page is missing from the crime novel he is reading.

== Season 8 ==
Title	Rough Translation (in brackets)	Episode
"Himmelen kan vente"	[Heaven Can Wait]	1
Marve finds that he has a Swedish half-brother.
