= Eyvind Alnæs =

Norwegian musician (1872–1932)

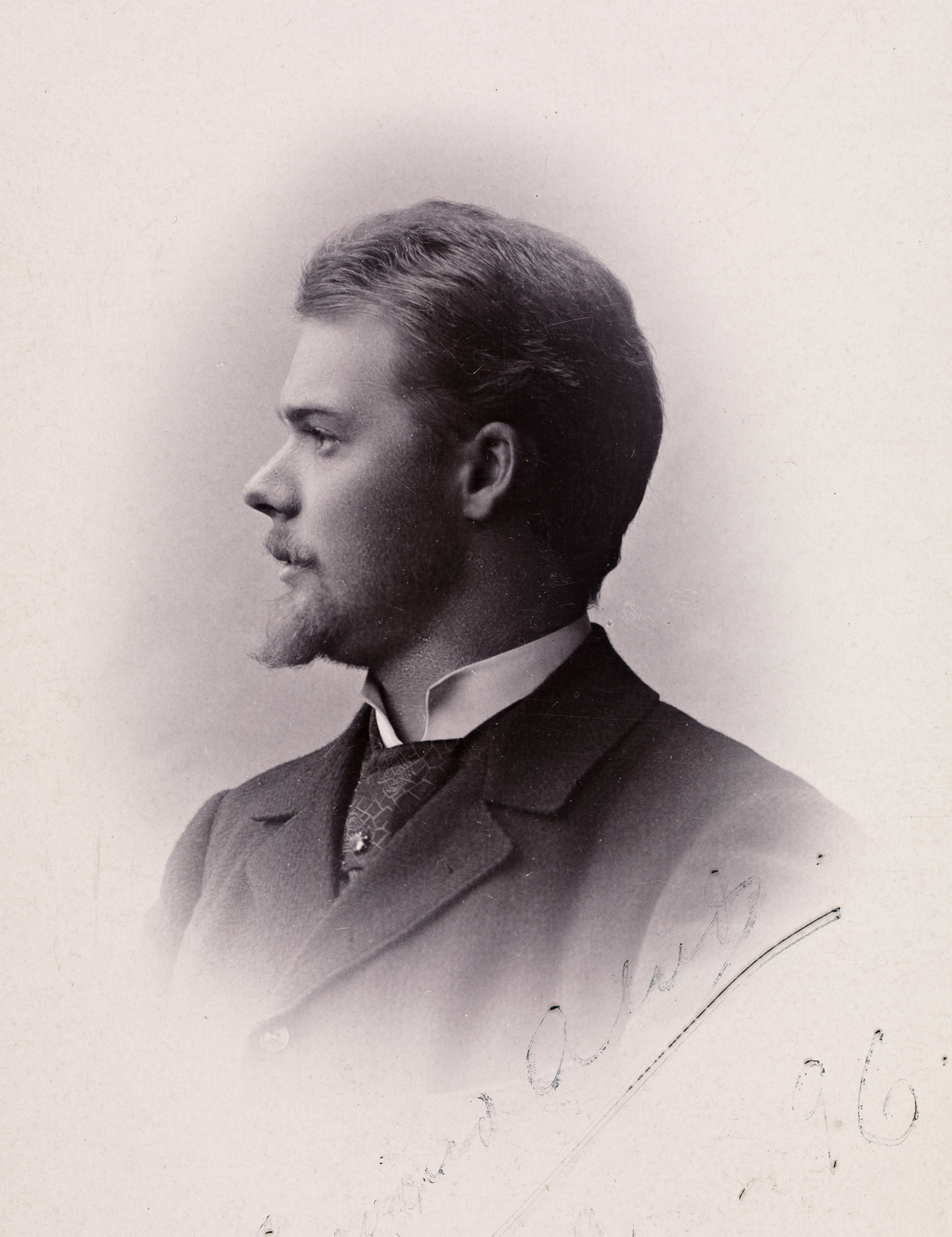
- Born: 29 April 1872; Fredrikstad
- Died: 24 December 1932 (aged 60)
- Education: Music and Organist School in Oslo
- Occupations: Composer; Pianist; Organist; Choir Director

Eyvind Alnæs (29 April 1872 – 24 December 1932) was a Norwegian composer, pianist, organist and choir director.

== Personal life ==
Alnæs was born in Fredrikstad, as the son of headmaster Johannes Jørgen Lauritz Alnæs (1835–1916) and Elise Martine Hansen (1851–1931). He married Emilie Thorne (1882–1976) in 1903. He was the father of author Lise Børsum, and grandfather of novelist Finn Alnæs and artist Bente Børsum.

== Career ==
In 1888 he was enrolled at the Music and Organist School in Oslo (Musikkonservatoriet i Oslo). Alnæs studied piano with Westye Waaler, organ with Peter Brynie Lindeman as well as harmony, counterpoint and composition with Iver Holter. In April 1892, after Alnæs had finished his studies in Oslo, he studied in Leipzig with Carl Reinecke and, after the première of his first symphony in 1896, in Berlin with Julius Ruthardt.

For many years he played the organ in several churches and conducted choirs. During the years 1895-1907 he was organist at Bragernes Church in Drammen. From 1907 to 1916 he was at Uranienborg Church in Oslo and between 1916 and 1932 at Oslo Cathedral. He helped found the Norwegian Society of Composers in 1917 and served as chairman from 1921 to 1923.

Alnæs wrote music in a late Romantic style; his output included two symphonies, one set of symphonic variations, a piano concerto, pieces for piano, chorale preludes for organ, choral works, and art songs (in Norwegian, romanser).

Alnæs received the King's Medal of Merit (Kongens fortjenstmedalje) in gold in 1922, and in 1932 was appointed a Knight 1st Class in the Order of St. Olav.

He died in 1932 and was buried at Vestre gravlund cemetery in the Frogner borough of Oslo.

== Discography ==
A number of songs by Alnæs have been recorded by the likes of Kirsten Flagstad and Feodor Chaliapin. In 2007 the first recording of Alnæs's Piano Concerto in D major, Op. 27 (published c. 1919) was released; it featured Piers Lane as the piano soloist and the Bergen Philharmonic Orchestra conducted by Andrew Litton. In early 2010 the premiere recording of his two symphonies - no.1 in C minor, Op.7 and no.2 in D major, Op.43 - was released, with the Latvian National Symphony Orchestra conducted by Terje Mikkelsen.
