= Gudrun Waadeland =

Norwegian actress (1937–2020)

- Born: 3 August 1937
- Spouse(s): Svein Erik Brodal

Gudrun Waadeland (3 August 1937 – 8 October 2020) was a Norwegian actress and theatre director.

== Career ==
She was born in Oslo, made her film debut in 1955 in Arne Skouen's Det brenner i natt! and her stage debut at Det Norske Teatret in 1959. She then worked in Fjernsynsteatret from 1960 to 1963, Riksteatret from 1963 to 1964 and 1970 to 1975 and Edderkoppen 1964 to 1965. She was then the director of Riksteatret from 1975 to 1988.

Waadeland died on 8 October 2020 at the age of 83.

Cultural offices
| Preceded by Eivind Hjelmtveit | Director of the Riksteatret; 1975–1988 | Succeeded by Anne Gullestad |
