= The Chasers (1959 film) =

1959 film

- Directed by: Erik Løchen
- Written by: Erik Løchen
- Produced by: Sølve Kern
- Starring: Rolf Søder
- Cinematography: Tore Breda Thoresen
- Edited by: Erik Løchen
- Release date: 24 August 1959
- Running time: 94 minutes
- Country: Norway
- Language: Norwegian

The Chasers (Norwegian: Jakten) is a 1959 Norwegian drama film directed by Erik Løchen and starring Rolf Søder, Bente Børsum and Tor Stokke. The film was entered into the 1960 Cannes Film Festival.

== Plot ==
The plot revolves around two men (Søder and Stokke) who vie for the attention of the same woman (Børsum) while on a hunting trip.

== Cast ==
- Rolf Søder - Bjørn
- Bente Børsum - Guri (as Benedikte Liseth)
- Tor Stokke - Knut
- Harald Aimarsen
- Bjarne Bø
- Anders Boger
- Carsten Byhring - Cameo appearance
- Kristen Dahl
- Eilert Flyen
- Bonne Gauguin
- Lillemor Grimsgaard
- Odd Grythe
- Olafr Havrevold - Narrator (voice)
- Egil Hjorth-Jenssen
- Matias Lindalen
- Egil Lorck
- Rolf Just Nilsen - Cameo appearance
- Henri Poirier
- Thorleif Reiss
