= Sonja Mjøen =

Norwegian actress, journalist and author

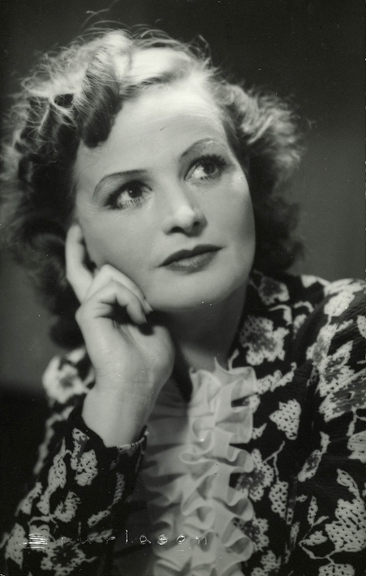
- Sonja Mjøen
- Born: 25 December 1898; Christiania, Norway
- Died: 25 February 1993 (aged 94)
- Occupation: Actress
- Spouse: Axel Kielland (m. 1932–1946)
- Relatives: Fridtjof Mjøen (brother); Jon Lennart Mjøen (brother)

Sonja Mjøen (25 December 1898 – 25 February 1993) was a Norwegian actress, journalist and author.

== Biography ==
She was born in Christiania (now Oslo), Norway. She was the daughter of Claire Grevérus Mjøen (1874–1963) and Jon Alfred Mjøen (1860–1939). She was a sister of Fridtjof Mjøen and Jon Lennart Mjøen. From 1932 to 1946, she was married to journalist Axel Kielland who was a writer and journalist in Dagbladet.

She made her stage debut at Trondhjems nationale Scene in 1924, in Hjalmar Christensen's play Din egen herre. Her film debut was in 1927. In 1942, she escaped with her family from German-occupied Norway to Stockholm and did income-generating work for Svenska Norgehjälpen. After the Second World War, she got an appointment at the Centralteatret under Reidar Otto (1890–1959).

She re-located to the United States in 1953 and wrote reports for Dagbladet until 1974 when she returned to Norway. She published the books Da mor var ung in 1975 and Elsk din skjebne in 1977.
