= Little Ida =

Norwegian-Swedish drama film

- Directed by: Laila Mikkelsen
- Written by: Marit Paulsen; Laila Mikkelsen
- Produced by: Harald Ohrvik
- Starring: Sunniva Lindekleiv
- Release dates: 6 March 1981 (Norway); 1 March 1982 (Sweden)
- Running time: 87 minutes
- Countries: Norway; Sweden
- Language: Norwegian

Little Ida (Norwegian: Liten Ida) is a 1981 Norwegian-Swedish drama film directed by Laila Mikkelsen. The picture is based on the novel Little Ida by Marit Paulsen and set in Norway during World War II.

Sunniva Lindekleiv, Lise Fjeldstad and Rønnaug Alten shared the award for Best Actress at the 18th Guldbagge Awards.

== Cast ==
- Sunniva Lindekleiv as Ida
- Lise Fjeldstad as Ida's mother
- Arne Lindtner Næss as Idas nye pappa
- Howard Halvorsen as Bjørn, Ida's older brother
- Minken Fosheim as Helga
- Ellen Westerfjell as Reija
- Rønnaug Alten as Mrs. Revaasen
- Gunnar Olram as Mr. Revaasen
- Anne-Lise Tangstad as Organist
- Odd Remen as Teacher
- Erik Hivju as Tysk soldat
- Randi Koch as Reijas mor
- Jan Erik Aune as Tysk officer
