= Vaktpostene =

- Directed by: Arne Skouen
- Written by: Arne Skouen; Johan Borgen
- Starring: Arne Aas; Synne Skouen; Bjørg Vatle; Rolf Søder; Rønnaug Alten
- Cinematography: Odd Geir Sæther
- Edited by: Bjørn Breigutu
- Music by: Gunnar Sønstevold
- Distributed by: Ara-Film AS
- Release date: September 16, 1965
- Running time: 91 minutes
- Country: Norway
- Language: Norwegian

Vaktpostene (The Guards) is a Norwegian drama film from 1965 directed by Arne Skouen. The screenplay was written by Skouen and Johan Borgen.

== Plot ==
The film is about a recruit named Arild, who runs away from his military service and arrives at a home for autistic children, where he wants to remain to help.

== Cast ==
- Synne Skouen as Bene
- Arne Aas as Arild, a soldier
- Rønnaug Alten as Hanne
- Rolf Søder as Haraldsen
- Bjørg Vatle as Randi
- Hans Stormoen as the judge
- Frimann Falck Clausen as the actor
- Svein Wickstrøm as Carl, a member of the military police
- Adolf Bjerke as the counsel for the defense
- Alf Malland as the captain
- Vegard Hall as Magnar Post
- Carl Frederik Prytz as Dr. Kleve
- Nils Sundbye as Martin
