= Fire in the Night (1955 film) =

1955 film

- Directed by: Arne Skouen
- Written by: Arne Skouen
- Starring: Claes Gill
- Release date: 1955
- Running time: 96 minutes
- Country: Norway
- Language: Norwegian

Fire in the Night (Norwegian: Det brenner i natt!) is a 1955 Norwegian drama film directed by Arne Skouen. It was entered into the 1955 Cannes Film Festival.

== Plot ==
Tim is a proofreader at a newspaper in Oslo by day, and a pyromaniac at night. Only one other person knows about Tim's dark side: his childhood friend and editor of the newspaper. The two have kept the secret for years until the secretary, Margrethe, finds out. Eager to help, she becomes Tim's confidant.

== Cast ==
- Claes Gill as Tim
- Elisabeth Bang as Margrethe, sosialsekretær
- Harald Heide Steen as Tims barndomsvenn
- Gudrun Waadeland as Korrekturass
- Thor Hjorth-Jenssen as Journalist
- Helge Essmar as Redaksjonssekretær
- Harald Aimarsen as Redaksjonsmedarb
