= Thorleif Reiss =

Norwegian actor (1898–1988)

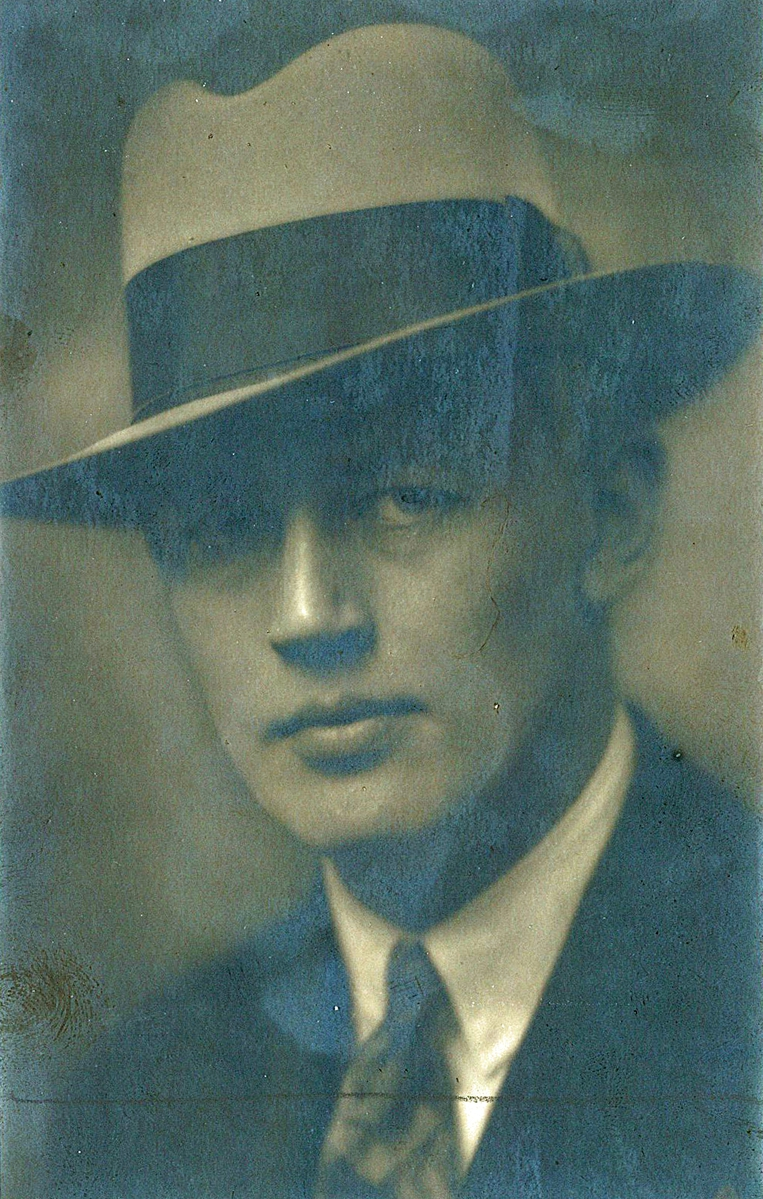
- Born: May 22, 1898; Aker, Oslo, Norway
- Died: April 14, 1988 (aged 89); Oslo, Norway
- Occupation: Actor
- Children: Helge Reiss
- Father: Georg Reiss
- Relatives: Elisabeth Reiss

Thorleif Dymling Reiss (May 22, 1898 – April 14, 1988) was a Norwegian actor.

== Career ==
Reiss made his debut at the National Theater in Oslo in 1918. From 1931 to 1939, he was employed at the Carl Johan Theater, where he also served as co-director. From 1942 onward he was employed at the New Theater.

== Family ==
Reiss was the son of the lawyer, composer, and musicologist Georg Reiss and Elisabeth Dymling (1861–1920). He was the brother of the pianist and cabaret performer Elisabeth Reiss and the father of the actor Helge Reiss. He played opposite his son in the 1970 crime comedy Skulle det dukke opp flere lik er det bare å ringe. His first marriage was in 1920 to Esther Colbjørnsen Dahl (1896–1941). After her death, he remarried in 1944 to Gunborg Kristiane Skistad (1911–2001).

== Filmography ==
- 1922: Die Gezeichneten as Alexander Krasnow (Sasha)
- 1933: Jeppe på bjerget as Victor
- 1941: Gullfjellet as Pettersen
- 1942: Den farlige leken as Mr. Holt
- 1942: Det æ'kke te å tru as Harald Hagen
- 1943: Den nye lægen as Mørch, an engineer
- 1946: Englandsfarere as the lawyer
- 1948: Kampen om tungtvannet as Jomar Brun, an engineer
- 1948: Trollfossen as Kavli, an office manager
- 1954: I moralens navn as Alf Mowitz
- 1958: I slik en natt as the chief doctor
- 1959: Jakten
- 1970: Balladen om mestertyven Ole Høiland as Count Wedel Jarlsberg
- 1970: Skulle det dukke opp flere lik er det bare å ringe as Direktor Marthinsen
- 1971: 3
- 1972: Motforestilling
- 1974: Under en steinhimmel as the minister
- 1977: Karjolsteinen as the judge
- 1982: Henrys bakværelse as customer #2
