= Dickie Dick Dickens =

Dickie Dick Dickens is a satirical radio play by Rolf Becker and Alexandra Becker. The play, which tells the story of Dickie Dick Dickens' rise from simple pickpocket to gangster leader in Chicago, was first produced in Germany in 1959 by Bayerischer Rundfunk, which produced the last of its 51 episodes in 1976. Radio Bremen, Schweizer Radio DRS, Norwegian National Broadcasting NRK and Swedish National Broadcasting Sveriges Radio also made their own productions. It became particularly popular in Norway where it was voted the most popular radio play of all time in 2001.

Rolf and Alexandra Becker also published five books parallel with the production of the radio play. A theatre play based on the radio play debuted in Norway in 2011.

== The plot ==
The story is set in the 1920s in Chicago and tells the story of Dickie Dick Dickens evolving from a simple pickpocket to the "most dangerous man in Chicago's underworld", "a shining star in the wonderful million city's gangster sky". Among the members of his gang are the old friend Opa Crackle and superstitious Bonzo. His chief opponent is fellow gangster leader Jim Cooper while his opponents in the police include Chief Sergeant Lionel McKenzie and Sergeant Hillbilly.

An important part of the play is the two narrators who underline that the story is based on "countless partly dubious, partly non-existing sources" which form the basis for an "in every detail truthful rendering". Most important of the historical documentation is Dickie Dick Dickens's memoirs, written 20 years later in Sing Sing and translated into fourteen languages. According to the story, Dickie Dick Dickens lived 68% of his life in Chicago and 32% in Sing Sing.

Each episode ends with a cliffhanger.

In an interview Rolf Becker said that the play was inspired by American quasi-documentary crime series like Dragnet and some tendencies in film noir. Johannes Joner who played Dickie Dick Dickens in a theater version describes Dickie as a mixture of Al Capone and Arsène Lupin.

== Germany and Switzerland ==
Bayerischer Rundfunk produced 51 episodes from 1959 to 1976. The six episodes in 1976 were independent from the episodes that were made in 1959 and the 1960s and featured Dickie Dick Dickens travelling in Europe.

Radio Bremen made the first season of Dickie Dick Dickens in 1960 and 1961, followed by two later seasons. The original radio tapes were not preserved and in 2003, Radio Bremen encouraged their listeners to send private cassette recordings of the radio play to the station. They obtained the two last seasons, but not the first. In 2008, Radio Bremen made a new production of the first season.

Schweizer Radio DRS also made their own production of the play.

== Norway and Sweden ==
Dickie Dick Dickens came to Norway via Paul Skoe who was instructor for Radioteatret and was introduced to the play when on a work visit to a German radio station. The first series was broadcast in 1962 and the last of the ordinary six series was broadcast in 1976.

The Norwegian version had song and music in various styles composed by Gunnar and Maj Sønstevold, including a song about Chicago with a male choir. Dickie Dick Dickens was played by Frank Robert, and Jim Cooper by Jack Fjeldstad.

Being first broadcast in the early 1960s when Norway only had one radio station and television was not as widespread as today, Dickie Dick Dickens became immensely popular. According to Fredrik Wandrup in 2011, "when new episodes were sent the nation was as silent as after a gangster massacre".

In 2001, listeners of NRK voted Dickie Dick Dickens the most popular radio play of all time.

Sveriges Radio produced 36 episodes in 1965 and 1966. Dickie Dick Dickens was played by Martin Ljung while Beppe Wolgers played Jim Cooper. Four more episodes were made in 1970 and another four in 1973.

== Books, theatre ==
Rolf and Alexandra Becker wrote five novels parallel with the radio play productions; the first one was published in 1959.

- Dickie Dick Dickens (1959)
- Dickie gibt kein Fersengeld (1963)
- Dickie Dick Dickens gegen Chicago (1964)
- Dickie Dick Dickens schlägt Wellen (1986)

The books have been translated into Swedish, and later also into Norwegian and sold in Norway; the first was published in 2012.

Five CD series of the Norwegian version have been released, the first in 1998. As of 2011, the series had sold 30,000 copies.

In 2011, Oslo Nye Teater/Centralteatret in Oslo staged a play based on the series. It featured Johannes Jones playing Dickie Dick Dickens, Monica Hjelle playing Effie Marconi while four other characters were played by puppets. The play later toured Norway as part of Riksteatret.
