= Laila Mikkelsen =

Norwegian film producer (1940–2023)

- Born: 20 August 1940; Vardø, Norway
- Died: 13 January 2023 (aged 82)
- Occupation(s): Film director and producer

Laila Mikkelsen (20 August 1940 – 13 January 2023) was a Norwegian film director and producer.

== Career ==
Mikkelsen was born in Vardø on 20 August 1940. She made her film debut in 1976 with Oss. Her film Little Ida is set during the German occupation of Norway, and received international attention. Her film Søsken på Guds jord was based on a novel by Arvid Hanssen. In 1984 she directed the film Snart 17.

Mikkelsen died on 13 January 2023, at the age of 82.
