= Om Tilla =

- Directed by: Arne Skouen
- Written by: Arne Skouen
- Based on: Arne Skouen's novel Bare om barn
- Starring: Eva Henning; Toralv Maurstad; Synne Skouen
- Cinematography: Ragnar Sørensen
- Edited by: Sølve Kern
- Music by: Gunnar Sønstevold
- Distributed by: Kommunenes filmcentral
- Release date: September 12, 1963
- Running time: 77 minutes
- Country: Norway
- Language: Norwegian

Om Tilla (About Tilla) is a Norwegian drama film from 1963 directed by Arne Skouen. Skouen wrote the screenplay, which was based on his 1959 novel Bare om barn. It contained a series of articles from the newspaper Verdens Gang, in which Skouen pointed out that children with intellectual disabilities and children with behavioral difficulties did not receive sufficient financial support or professional help.

== Plot ==
The child psychologist Ivar visits Tilla's mother, Maria, one day at the Botanical Garden in Oslo. Ivar had Tilla under observation a few months earlier, but Maria did not return with her daughter. The child psychologist manages to persuade Maria to come with Tilla to the children's psychiatric clinic so that they can start treating her. At the clinic, they meet the chief physician Mimi Backer. Tilla has not spoken in a year and a half. In the observation room at the clinic, the first small glimmer of light falls on the mystery. There, the girl builds up her secret world through toys she chooses to express herself.

== Cast ==
- Eva Henning as Maria
- Toralv Maurstad as Ivar
- Wenche Foss as Mimi Backer, the chief physician
- Synne Skouen as Tilla, Maria's daughter
- Egil Lorck as Bernhard, a gardener
- Tore Foss as Haugen, the ship inspector
- Erik Gløersen as Terje
- Johannes Eckhoff as the school psychologist
- Pål Virik as a teenager
- Roy Bjørnstad as a gardener
- Kai Remlov as a teenager
- Bonne Gauguin
