= Journey to the Sea =

- Directed by: Arne Skouen
- Written by: Arne Skouen
- Starring: Erik Bye; Synne Skouen
- Cinematography: Odd Geir Sæther
- Edited by: Bjørn Breigutu
- Music by: Gunnar Sønstevold
- Distributed by: Kommunenes filmcentral
- Release date: November 3, 1966
- Running time: 89 minutes
- Country: Norway
- Language: Norwegian

Journey to the Sea (Norwegian: Reisen til havet) is a Norwegian drama film from 1966 directed by Arne Skouen, who was also the screenwriter. Skouen's daughter Synne Skouen played Pinne, a teenage girl wanted by the authorities.

== Plot ==
The truck driver Hilmar offers fifteen-year-old Pinne a ride. The girl, who seems frightened and withdrawn, does not say much other than that she wants to go to the sea. At a gas station, Hilmar learns from the radio that Pinne is wanted. She has escaped from the school where she was placed. Hilmar faces a dilemma: whether to call the sheriff or not.

== Cast ==
- Erik Bye as Hilmar, the truck driver
- Synne Skouen as Pinne, the wanted teenager
- Frimann Falck Clausen as the sheriff
- Oddvar Einarson as the boy that finds Pinne's furniture
- Bonne Gauguin as Johanne
- Vegard Hall as Niri
- Anne-Vibekke Hansen as a girl
- Peter Lindbæk as Biggen
- Egil Lorck as Tønna
- Wenche Medbøe as the curator
- Anne-Lise Tangstad as the supervisor
- Carsten Winger as the bartender
