= Astrid Folstad =

Norwegian actress (1932–2009)

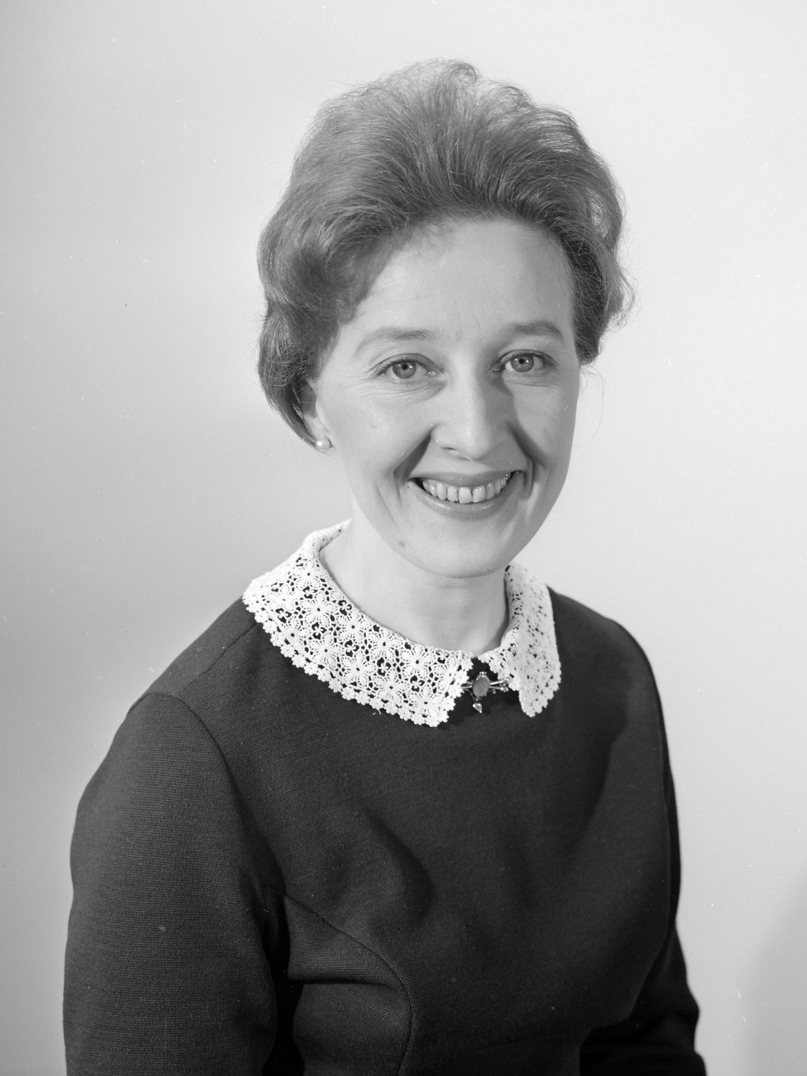
Astrid Folstad in 1967

Astrid Borgny Folstad (31 May 1932 – 21 January 2009) was a Norwegian actress.

She was educated at the Norwegian National Academy of Theatre from 1953 to 1956. She made her debut at the National Theatre in 1955, and was employed at Det Norske Teatret from 1956 to 1959 and at the National Theatre from 1959. She had ninety parts in total before retiring in 2003. She also appeared in several films and television series, including Kristin Lavransdatter. From 1970 to 1986 she was a teacher at the Norwegian National Academy of Theatre.

She was married to fellow actor Knut Risan. She resided at Høvik.

== Filmography ==
- 1976: Oss as the mother
- 1985: Kristin Lavransdatter as Groa Guttormsdatter
