= Terje Hartviksen =

Norwegian actor and director

Terje Hartviksen (born 19 January 1950) is a Norwegian actor, stage director and theatre director.

He began his career at Teatret Vårt in 1975. He was the director of Teater Ibsen from 1989 to 1994, Riksteatret from 1994 to 1996 and Brageteatret from 2000.

Cultural offices
| Preceded by Anne Gullestad | Director of the Riksteatret; 1994–1996 | Succeeded by Bente Erichsen |
