= Maj Sønstevold =

Swedish composer (1917-1996)

Maj Sønstevold (born Lundén; 9 September 1917 – 14 March 1996) was a Swedish composer who lived and worked in Norway.

== Biography ==
Maj Sønstevold was born in Sollefteå, Sweden. She studied piano in Stockholm and with Billy Mayerl in London. She married Norwegian composer Gunnar Sønstevold and in 1945 moved to Norway, where she worked as a composer and music teacher. Later she and her family spent time in Vienna, where she studied with Hanns Jelinek and Karl Schiske and graduated in composition in 1966 from the Akademisches Hauptseminar.

From 1971 to 1985 Sønstevold taught in the Music Department of Oslo University. In 1974 she and her husband founded The Maj and Gunnar Sønstevold Music Institute in Rakkestad.

Søstevold held a number of positions on the Norwegian music scene and served as a board member of organisations Music Information Centre Norway, the Norwegian Society of Composers and the Norwegian Academy of Music.

== Output ==
Maj Sønstevold composed jazz, light music and avant garde music for theatre, film, radio and television. She also composed for orchestra, chamber ensemble, choir and solo instrument.

=== Selected works ===
==== Film music ====
- Skøytekongen (1953)
- Trost i taklampa (1955)
- Toya (1956)
- Elias Rekefisker (1958)
- Lån meg din kone (1958)
- Støv på hjernen (1959)
- Millionær for en aften (1960)
- Venner (1960)
- Villmarken kaller (1964)
- Fjolls til fjells (with Gunnar Sønstevold) (1957)
- Ann Magrit (with Gunnar Sønstevold) (1965)
- Fridtjof Nansen (with Gunnar Sønstevold) (1965)

==== Music for stage productions ====
- Amor og Psyche (1968)
- Bjurra (1969)
- Frøken Rosita (1969)
- Skandaleskolen (1969)
- Selma Brøter (1970)
- Dickie Dick Dickens (with G. Sønstevold) (1962)
- Benoni og Rosa (with G. Sønstevold) (1975)

==== Orchestral works ====
- Sørlandssommer (1956)
- Den gamle majors forunderlige drømmer (1969)
- Balladen om Selma Brøter (1979)
- Festouvertyre (1983)

==== Chamber music ====
- Tema med variasjoner for to diskantinstrumenter og slagverk (1965)
- Ni haiku for fløyte, harpe og altstemme (1966)
- Stillhet for åtte stemmer, fløyte, klarinett, fiolin, cello, klaver og slagverk (1978)
- Ithaca for baryton, fiolin, cello, harpe, klaver (tekst S. Skard) (1983)

==== Piano ====
- Suite (1963)
- Tema med variasjoner (1963)
- Sonate (1964)
- 11 polytonale blues (1978)
- Per apera ad astra (1983)

==== Choir ====
- I Nasaret for barnekor, Orff-instrumenter og fløyte (1980)

=== Discography ===
- Lars Lillo-Stenberg, Lars Lillo-Stenberg synger Prøysen (2006)
- Jørn Simen Øverli, Prøysenvisene som forsvant (2005)
- Norwegian Radio Orchestra, Tono - 75 år for Musikken - Fremtiden er Uhørt (2003)
- Alexandra Becker, Rolf Becker, Dickie Dick Dickens - fjerde serie: Nå er han her igjen (2003)
- Alexandra Becker, Rolf Becker, Dickie Dick Dickens - tredje serie (2001)
- Alexandra Becker, Rolf Becker, Dickie Dick Dickens - andre serie (1999)
- Alexandra Becker, Rolf Becker, Dickie Dick Dickens - første serie (1998)
- Alf Cranner, 50 Beste fra 40 år (2003)
- Hanne Krogh, Hanne Krogh (2002)
- Wenche Myhre, Du og jeg og vi to (2001)
- Alf Prøysen, Velvalgte viser (1998)
- Hilde Bekkevold, Kjerringkjeft og Pikekyss (1998)
- Alf Prøysen, Prøysens sommer (1994)
- Alf Prøysen, Blåklokkeleiken (1993)
- Alf Prøysen, Alf Prøysen på grammofon III - komplette plateinnspillinger 1954-1957 (1993)
- Jørn Simen Øverli, Jørn Simen Øverli synger Prøysen (1992)
- Kari Svendsen, Kari går til filmen (1991)
- Lillibeth Lunde Elgstøen, Som dogg i måråsol: Lillibeth Lunde Elgstøen hos Alf Prøysen (1986)
- Elisabeth Sønstevold, Per Øien, Romantic Flute and Harp (1985)
- Geir Henning Braaten, Norwegian Pianorama (1984)
- Anne Lise Gjøstøl, Kom, kom, skal jeg si deg no? (1980)
