= Synne Skouen =

Norwegian music writer and composer (born 1950)

Synne Skouen (born 8 August 1950) is a Norwegian music writer and composer.

== Biography ==
Skouen was born in Oslo. She studied at the Vienna Academy of Music with Alfred Uhl and Erwin Ratz for composition and Dieter Kaufmann and Friedrich Cerha for electronic music. She also studied with Finn Mortensen in Oslo, receiving her degree in composition from the Norwegian Academy of Music in 1976.

Skouen appeared in the 1966 film Reisen til havet, directed by her father, Arne Skouen. She worked as a member of the experimental music theatre group "Die Fremden" in Vienna. From 1977 to 1986 she worked as editor of the contemporary music periodical Ballade, and wrote as a music critic for Arbeiderbladet. In 1993 Skouen became the music director for Norwegian Broadcasting's cultural channel, and in 1999 was named Head of Culture. In 2002 she served as President of the Society of Norwegian Composers.

Synne Skouen has received a number of varied commissions throughout her career including works written for the Festival of North Norway, Bergen International Festival, Oslo Chamber Music Festival, Oslo International Grieg Festival, Ny Musikk, Norwegian National Opera and Ballet and NRK. Skouen has also written for theatre and film productions, including the radio production Gull Eaters written in collaboration with playwright Cecilie Løveid. The production earned them a 1983 Prix Italia Award for Best Drama.

2011 saw the release of the album Call-Notes featuring works by Skouen and in the following year her commissioned work Autumn Arias saw its premiere at the Ultima Oslo Contemporary Music Festival, featuring the Norwegian Chamber Orchestra and soloists Hans Christian Bræin and Øystein Birkeland.

September 2017 saw the premiere of Skouen's chamber opera Ballerina at the Norwegian National Opera and Ballet. The work is based on a play with the same title, penned by her father Arne Skouen. The original text has been adapted to an opera libretto by Oda Radoor.

Skouen is published by Norsk Musikkforlag, Musikk-Huset AS, Alicia Keys Music and her scores are available from the National Library of Norway’s print music service NB Noter.

== Production ==
=== Selected works ===
- Ven (for klaver), (2003)
- Sko for mange formål: Bill. merk. “Damekor søker mann” , (2003)
- Med tenna i behold: Bill. merk Mannskor søker dame, (2002)
- Fair Play – Pocket Music for Percussion, (1992)
- Une soirée d´été ... Méditation sur Marguerite D. pour violon seul, (1991)
- Balladen om Anna Roggløy (1990)
- Volven, (1987–88)
- Intonazione – quasi una fantasia (1987)
- Angrbodas datter (1986/91)
- Balansedame
- Måkespiserne (radioproduksjon; tekst: C. Løveid, regi: N. Macé), (1983)
- Rug (for kvinnestemme, cello og flygel; tekst: S. Obstfelder og C. Løveid), (1982–84)
- Hils Domitila! (piano solo), (1980)
- Musikk til filmen Formynderne (chamber), (1978)
- Tre haner galer (1985)
- Dusj (videoopera, sm.m. C. Løveid), (1984)
- Rosa (1984)
- Tombeau til Minona (1976)

=== Discography ===
- Call-Notes (2016)
- Guri Egge, Songs from the latest Century (2006)
- Geir Inge Lotsberg, Afontibus 2005
- Elisabeth Klein, Spiller Nordiske Kvindelige Komponister (1992)
- Geir Henning Braaten, Norwegian Pianorama (1984)

== Filmography ==
- Om Tilla (1963) as Tilla
- Vaktpostene (1965) as Bene
- Reisen til havet (1966) as Pinne
- Musikanter (1967) as Vivi
