= Claes Gill =

Norwegian writer, poet and actor

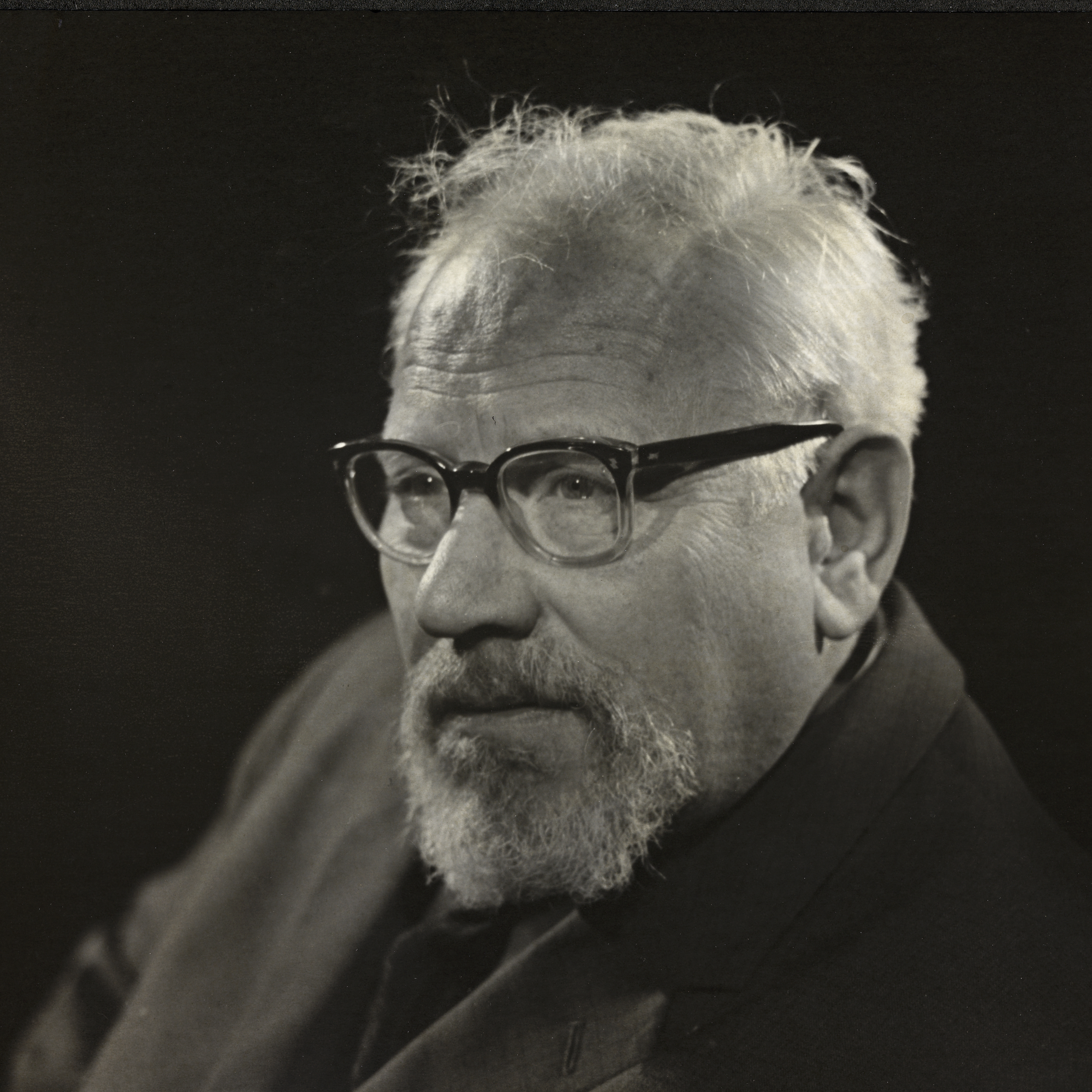
- Born: 13 October 1910; Odda Municipality
- Died: 11 June 1973; Oslo
- Occupations: Poet, actor, writer, opinion writer, journalist

Claes Gill (13 October 1910 - 11 June 1973) was a Norwegian writer, poet and actor.

Born in Odda, but spent his childhood years in Bergen, before moving to Oslo permanently.

His most famous works were the poetry book Fragment av et magisk liv ("Fragment of a magic life") in 1939, followed by Ord i jærn ("Words in iron") in 1942. Both books were inspired by French Symbolism, and stand as early examples of the modern form.

He later became involved in acting, and was director of Rogaland Teater from 1952 til 1956. In 1959 he starred in the film The Master and His Servants, which was entered into the 9th Berlin International Film Festival.

Cultural offices
Preceded by Kjell Stormoen	Director of the Rogaland Teater; 1952–1956	Succeeded by Gisle Straume
