= Lise Børsum =

Norwegian resistance member (1908–1985)

- Born: 18 September 1908; Kristiania, Norway
- Died: 29 August 1985 (aged 76); Oslo, Norway
- Occupations: Non-fiction writer Organizational leader
- Notable work: Fange i Ravensbrück (1946); Fjerndomstol Moskva. Fra dagens Berlin og Sovjets fangeleirer (1951)
- Children: Bente Børsum
- Parent: Eyvind Alnæs

Milly Elise "Lise" Børsum (18 September 1908 – 29 August 1985) was a Norwegian resistance member during World War II, survivor from the Ravensbrück concentration camp, and known for her writings and organizing work after the war.

== Personal life ==
Lise Alnæs was born in Kristiania, as the daughter of pianist and composer Eyvind Alnæs and his wife Emilie Thorne. She was married to physician Ragnar Børsum from 1930 to 1949, and was mother of actress Bente Børsum.

== World War II ==
During World War II, Børsum was active in warning and helping Jews that risked deportation to German camps, and came to be member of a network which helped people escape to Sweden. She was arrested in April 1943, and incarcerated at the Grini concentration camp for two months. 28 June 1943 she was sent to Germany, with MS Monte Rosa from Oslo to Århus, and further with railway transport to Hamburg. After a short stay at the Hütten Gefängnis in Hamburg she ended up as Nacht und Nebel prisoner at the Ravensbrück concentration camp, a camp specifically for women. She was held at Ravensbrück until 8 April 1945, when the surviving Scandinavian prisoners were transported home with the White Buses organized by the Swedish Red Cross.

== Postwar career ==
After World War II Børsum wrote books on her experiences as a prisoner and on the characteristics of concentration camps. Her Fange i Ravensbrück ("Prisoner in Ravensbrück") was published in 1946, and Speilbilder in 1947. In 1951 she published a book on Soviet concentration camps, Fjerndomstol Moskva. Fra dagens Berlin og Sovjets fangeleirer. Børsum was co-founder of the organization Nasjonalhjelpen for krigens ofre in 1947, and headed the organization from 1966 to 1978. She was a member of the Commission Internationale Contre le Régime Concentrationnaire from its establishment in 1950. She was also a freelance writer for the newspaper Dagbladet for many years.

In 2006 actress Bente Børsum performed a monologue based on the life of her mother Lise, at Cafeteatret in Oslo.
