= Anne Gullestad =

Norwegian actress and theatre director

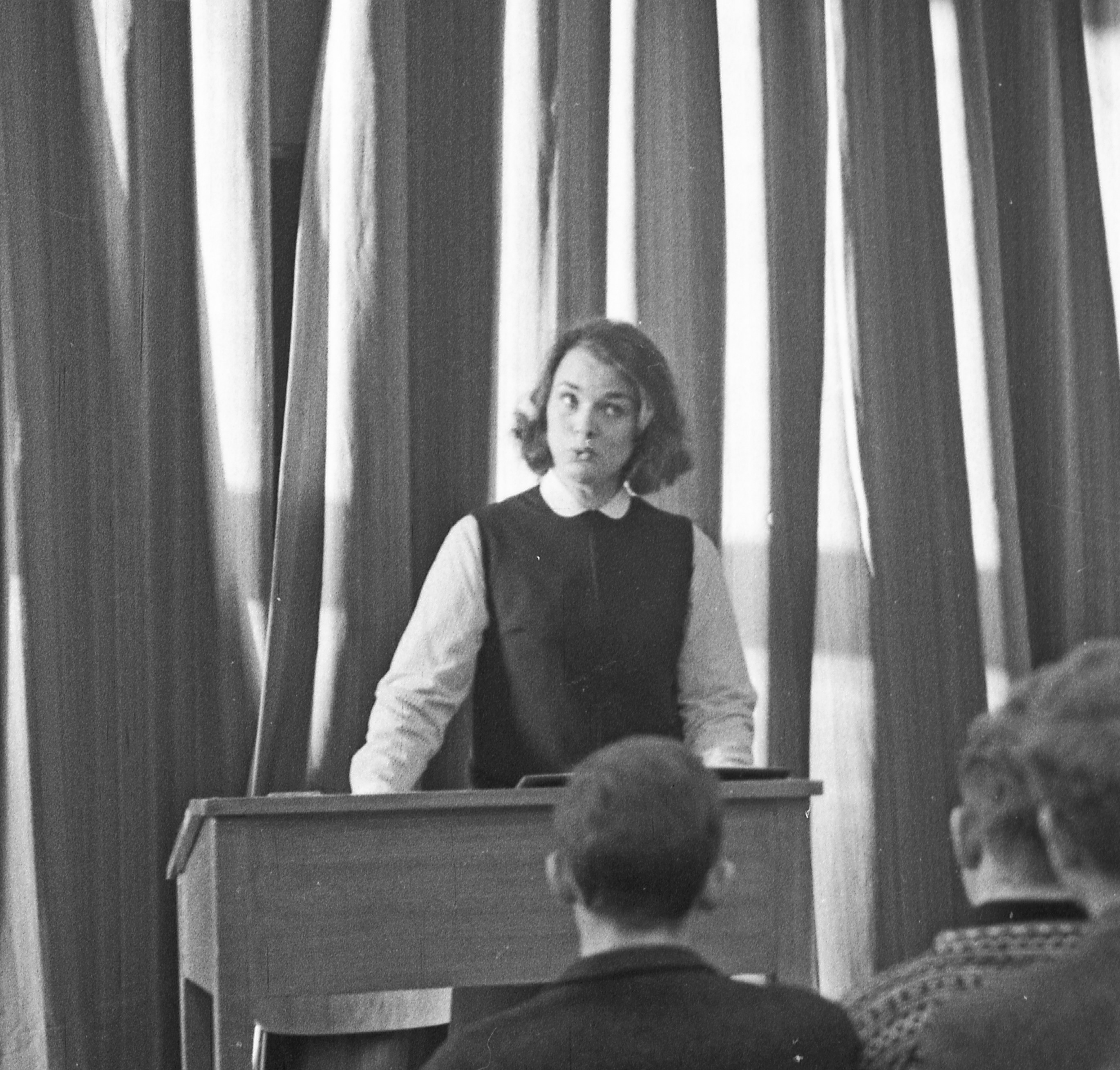
Anne Gullestad

Anne Gullestad (26 October 1925 – 1 April 1998) was a Norwegian actress and theatre director.

She was born in Kvinesdal Municipality, and finished her secondary education in 1945. She made her stage debut in 1950 at Den Nationale Scene. She co-founded Sogn og Fjordane Teater in 1977 and was director there from 1980 to 1988. From 1988 to 1994 she directed Riksteatret, and from 1995 Hordaland Teater. She was married to lawyer Wilhelm Jakob Haaland (1925–1995), brother of Arild Haaland. In 1989 she was decorated as a Knight, First Class of the Royal Norwegian Order of St. Olav. She died in April 1998 in Bergen.

Cultural offices
Preceded by Gudrun Waadeland	Director of the Riksteatret; 1988–1994	Succeeded by Terje Hartviksen
