= Bente Børsum =

Norwegian actress (born 1934)

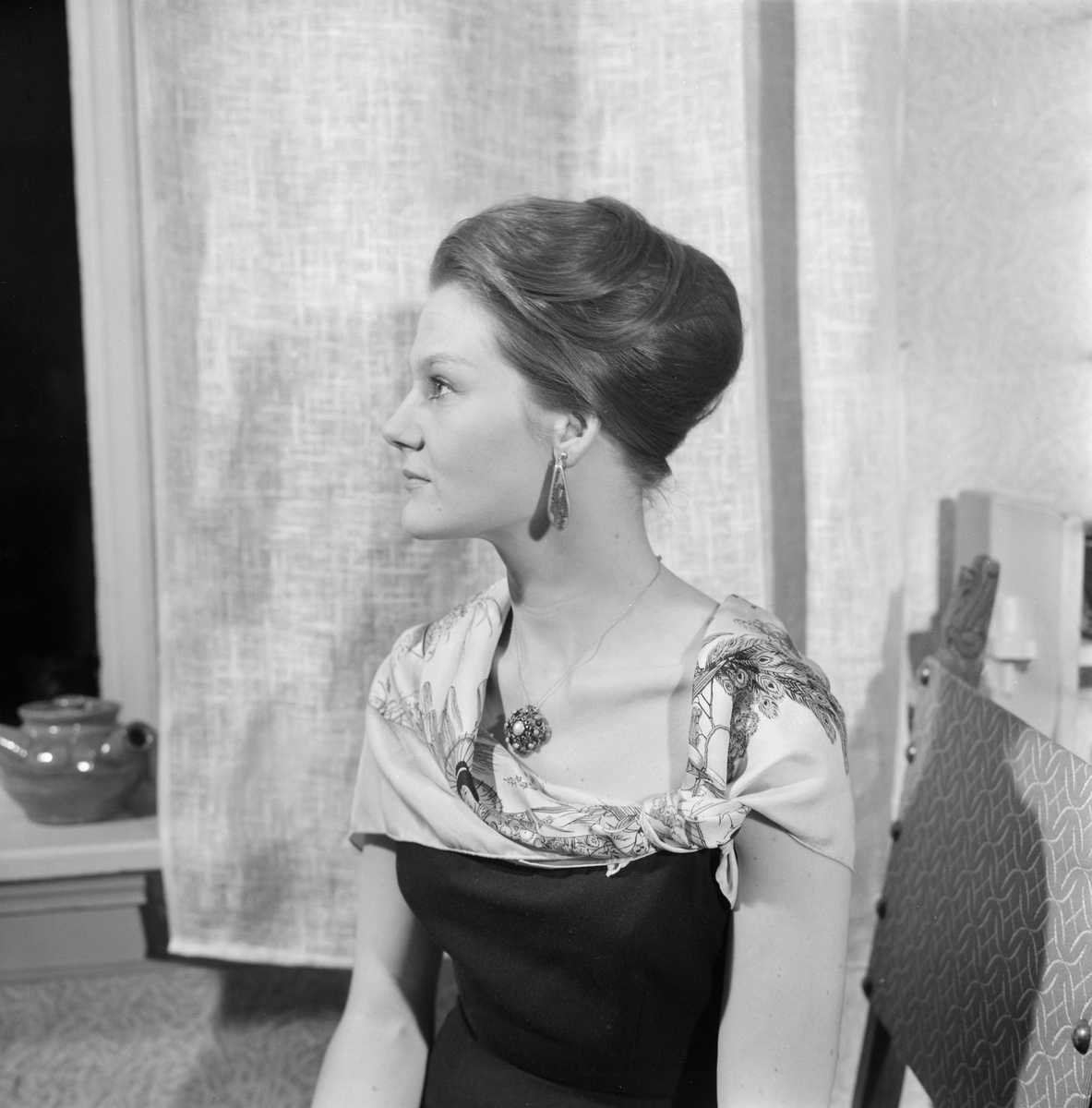
- Børsum in 1959
- Born: 21 June 1934 (age 92); Oslo, Norway
- Occupation: Actress
- Years active: 1959–present
- Mother: Lise Børsum
- Relatives: Eyvind Alnaes (grandfather)

Bente Børsum (born 21 June 1934) is a Norwegian actress, probably best known for her roles in the movies Mors hus (1974) and Reisen til julestjernen (1976). Børsum had her debut in the movie Jakten in 1959, and worked at Oslo Nye Teater from 1979. She retired from regular performance in 2005, with her performance in the play The House of Bernarda Alba by Federico García Lorca. Since then she has continued to perform, however, and has toured the country with her monologue about her mother, Min forestilling om mor. Børsum's mother, Lise Børsum, was involved in the Norwegian resistance movement in World War II and spent time in Ravensbrück concentration camp. When she returned, she abandoned her husband and child. Børsum's grandfather was the composer Eyvind Alnaes.

== Select filmography ==
- 1959: Jakten
- 1967: Liv
- 1971: Rødblått paradis as Mrs. Jervell
- 1973: Et Dukkehjem
- 1974: Mors hus
- 1974: Bobby's War
- 1976: Reisen til julestjernen
- 1977: Kosmetikkrevolusjonen
- 1980: Belønningen
- 1996: Gåten Knut Hamsun
- 1999: Suffløsen
- 2016: Sensommer
- 2024: Handling the Undead
