= Eric Scobie =

Norwegian writer

Eric Scobie (born 3 June 1952) is a Scottish / Norwegian author and journalist who works mainly from Norway.

== Biography ==
Scobie's first published work was in Motklang, a collection of short stories published by Forlaget Frustra in Oslo in 1974. This was followed up by the novel Bentvesten (Bent's Territory) in 1981. Published by Aschehoug, it was, according to the author, "a socio-fictional Western set in contemporary Norway". In 1986 Trekkfugler i garnet (Birds of Passage), was published by Ex Libris.

Scobie has been a member of the rock band Boastein since its inception in 1971. Boastein, founded by Øistein Boassen and Are Storstein, produced two albums: Jeg har min egen luke (My Very Own Hatch) in 1977, and Urgata Hurgata in 1980. In 1981, Scobie co-founded, with Erik Gustavson, in Oslo, the film company Fri Media Gruppe (Free Media Group), which produced a long series of shorts and commercial films.

As a translator and subtitler for television, at the Norwegian Broadcasting Corporation (NRK), Scobie contributed to the dissemination of Norwegian-produced TV-programmes throughout the world. He also translated many Norwegian radio documentaries. Scobie has also worked as an editor, most notably with the Norwegian version of the "War Papers", Krigsavisene, a series published by British-based publisher Albertas Ltd. For his work on this production, he was awarded the Norwegian prize for Free-lance Journalist of the Year 2001. In 1982 Scobie shared the Scheibler Award with Erik Gustavson for their short film Siste Kapittel (The Final Chapter).
