= Gamle Logen =

Music venue in Oslo, Norway

Coordinates: 59°54′25″N 10°44′29″E

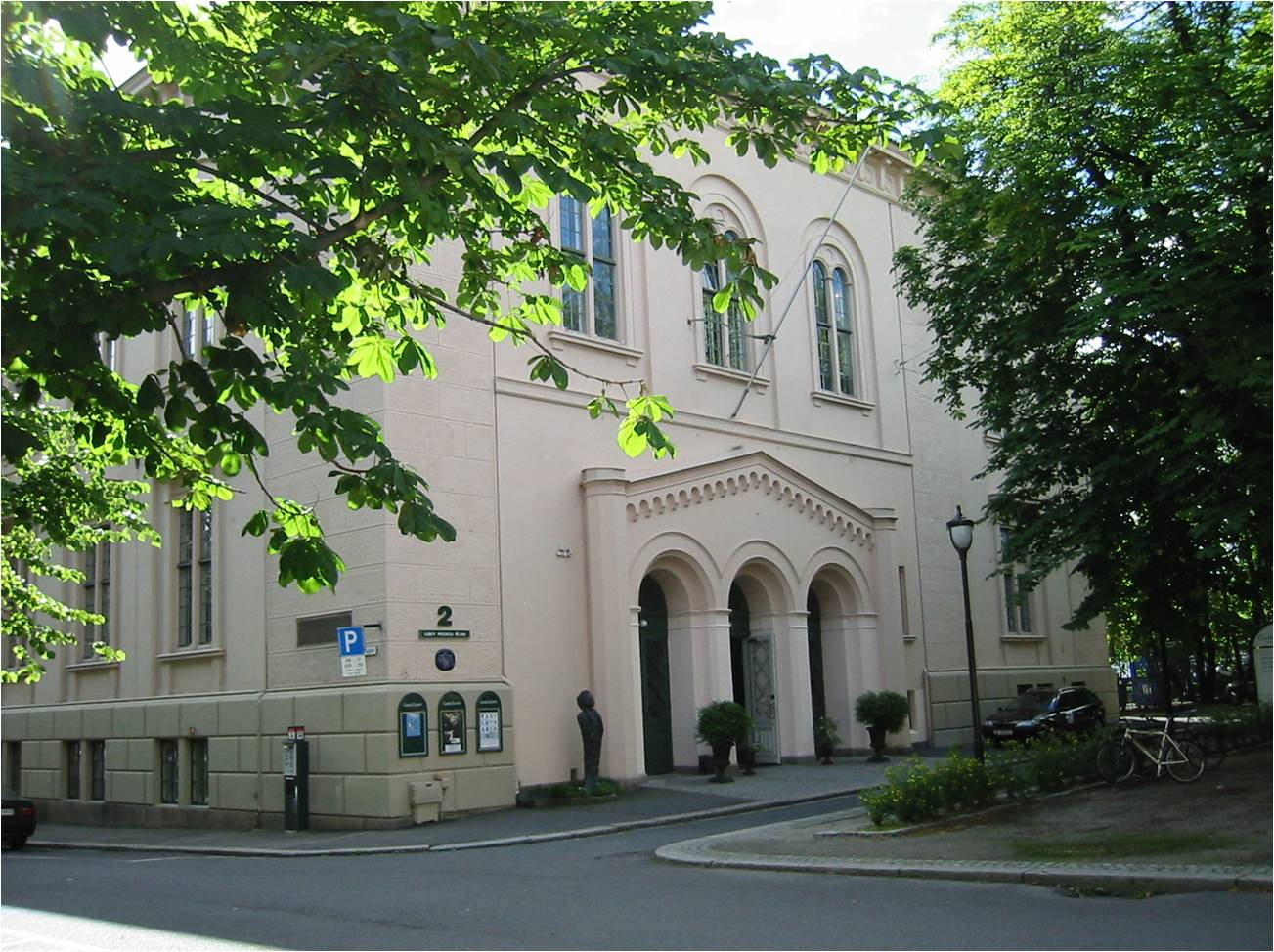
Gamle Logen

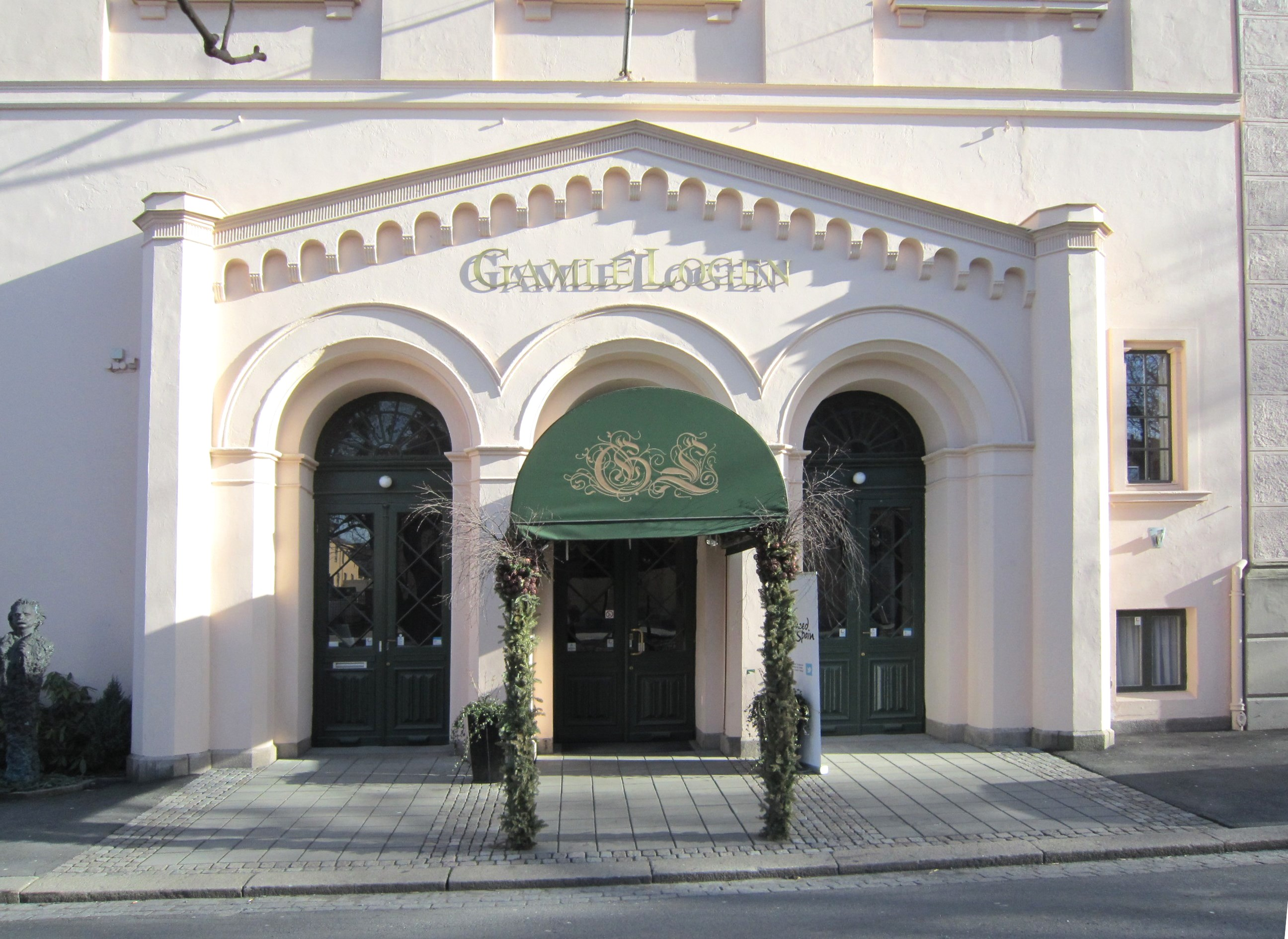
Gamle Logen entrance

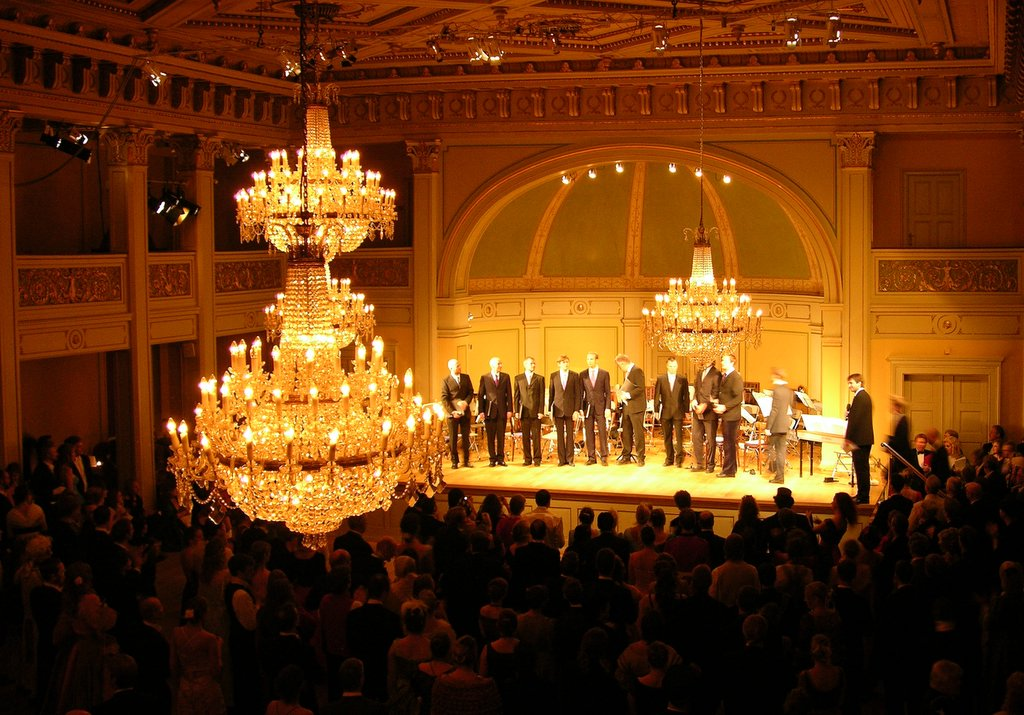
Operaball in Gamle Logen, 2005

Gamle Logen is a concert hall and music venue located at Grev Wedels plass 2 in Oslo, Norway. The hall also hosts artistic performances, conferences, banquets and private parties.

== History ==
Gamle Logen was originally built in 1836 for the Norwegian Order of Freemasons as a Masonic lodge. It was constructed in Empire style after an initiative from Herman Wedel Jarlsberg. Gamle Logen was inaugurated in 1839 with King Karl Johan and Crown Prince Oscar as honorary guests. The main hall officially was opened in 1844 with a performance by the great Norwegian violinist Ole Bull.

The hall has been centre stage for many historical and cultural events in the city of Oslo and played an important role in the development of the Norwegian cultural identity throughout the 19th century. Ole Bull is said to have discovered Bjørnstjerne Bjørnson and Henrik Ibsen there, it was Edvard Grieg's concert hall and Festpolonaise, Op.12 by Johann Svendsen was performed here in 1874.

Gamle Logen was left to the city of Oslo when the freemasons built their present hall in 1898. The hall has since served for municipal meetings and for the town council of the city of Oslo. Archives and the chandeliers were lost during the German occupation of Norway (1940–45). The hall was neglected for many years after the end of World War II. The historical atmosphere has since been recreated. Reopened fully restored in 1988, the hall is once again a venue for concerts, banquets and balls.

== Literature ==
- Dag Andersen (1994) Et hus i Europa. Gamle Logen 150 år (Oslo: C. Huitfeldt Forlag) ISBN 9788270031269
