= Tore Sinding =

Norwegian pianist and composer

Tore Sinding (1903 in Stavern – 1969 in Solbukta, Frogn) was a Norwegian pianist and composer.

He studied piano with Mary Barratt Due and Nils Larsen and organ with Arild Sandvold. Sinding also studied in Berlin, Vienna and Paris. His debut as a piano player was in 1922, as an organ player was in 1933 and as a composer was in 1945. He composed almost seventy songs, several piano pieces and the music of a ballett «Mot ballade» (after a short story by Hans E. Kinck). He was a well-respected pianist and piano teacher in his day.

== Recordings ==
Songs and piano works Anne Felberg, Njål Sparbo, Geir Henning Braaten - piano QCD 2003
