= Helge Reiss =

Norwegian actor (1928–2009)

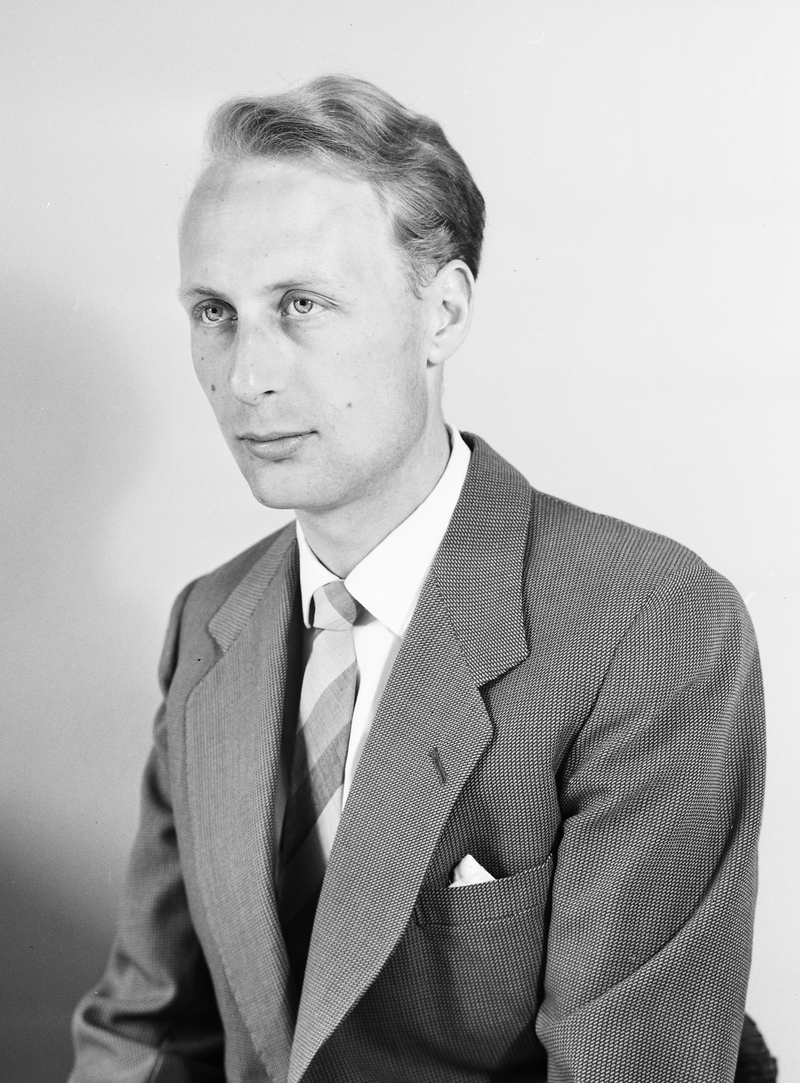
- Reiss in 1959
- Born: 27 February 1928
- Died: 9 November 2009 (aged 81)
- Citizenship: Norwegian

Helge Reiss (27 February 1928 – 11 November 2009) was a Norwegian actor. He was the son of the actor Thorleif Reiss.

== Early life ==
Reiss was born 27 February 1928.

== Career ==
He began his career in 1948 with a minor role in a low budget crime film, and remained active until his death. He provided the Norwegian voice of main character Carl Fredricksen in the dubbed version of the movie Up months before his death.

Reiss provided the voice for "Cogsworth" in Disney's 1991 animated film, Beauty and the Beast. Despite playing in more than thirty films, he was mostly known for his role as "Professor Drøvel" on the first season of the series Brødrene Dal and reprised his role in a small cameo in the fourth series, 27 years later. In later years he played in the Norwegian soap opera, Hotel Cæsar.

== Death ==
Reiss died on 11 November 2009, aged 81, from undisclosed causes.
