= Arne Skouen =

Norwegian journalist, author, film director and film producer

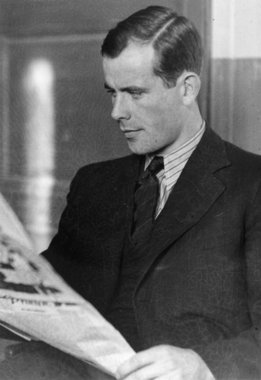
- Born: 18 October 1913; Oslo, Norway
- Died: 24 May 2003 (aged 89); Bærum, Akershus, Norway
- Occupations: journalist, author, film director

Arne Skouen (18 October 1913 – 24 May 2003) was a Norwegian journalist, author, film director and film producer.

== Biography ==
Arne Skouen was born in Kristiania (now Oslo), Norway. His parents were Peder Nikolai Skouen (1883–1978) and Jenny Emanuelson (1883–1975). He graduated at Hegdehaugen School in 1933. He had three distinct careers: journalist, author and filmmaker, partly at the same time.

He was a journalist at Dagbladet from 1935 to 1941. From 1941 during World War II, Skouen was associated with the Norwegian Resistance Movement during the occupation of Norway by Nazi Germany. From 1943 to 1945, Skouen worked at the press office in Stockholm, London, and New York City.

After the liberation of Norway at the end of World War II, he returned to Dagbladet as a columnist, serving from 1946 to 1947. He then worked at Verdens Gang from 1947 to 1957, where he introduced the use of die throws to review films (giving a score from 1 to 6, corresponding to the faces of a die), which is now common practice in Norwegian media. He later returned to Dagbladet, where he worked from 1971 to 1995.

=== Literary career ===
Skouen debuted as an author with the youth novel Gymnasiast (1932), followed by the novel Ruth sett meg (1937). During the war he published the children's play Barn av solen (1941) and Tre små enaktere (1943). This was followed in the postwar years by his novels Fest i Port des Galets and Romanen Gategutter (1948). Late in life, he published his autobiography En journalists erindringer (1996).

=== Film career ===
After the war, Skouen began working in film. His first film Gategutter (Street Boys) was released in 1949.

He received international fame for his 1957 film Ni Liv, about Jan Baalsrud's survival following a failed a WWII commando raid in occupied Norway, which received an Academy Award nomination for Best Foreign Language Film. It was also shown at the Cannes Film Festival.

His 1959 film The Master and His Servants was entered into the 9th Berlin International Film Festival. His 1962 film Cold Tracks was entered into the 3rd Moscow International Film Festival.

In 1980, he received the Narvesen Prize (Narvesenprisen), in 1983 the Oslo City Culture Prize, in 1986 the Ibsen Prize (Ibsenprisen) and the Honorary Prize of the Amanda Prize (Amandaprisen), in 1988 the Arts Council Norway Honorary Award (Norsk kulturråds ærespris), in 1993 the Oslo Byes Veles Prize and Fritt Ord Award. He was an honorary member of the Norwegian Dramatic Society and Norwegian Film Association.

== Personal life ==
He was married in 1946 to Kari Øksnevad (born 1926). Their daughter Synne Skouen (born 1950) became a composer.

On May 24, 2003, he died, and was buried at Vestre gravlund in Oslo.

== Selected filmography ==
- Emergency Landing (1952)
- Circus Fandango (1954)
- Det brenner i natt! (1955)
- Ni Liv (1957)
- Pastor Jarman kommer hjem (1958)
- The Master and His Servants (1959)
- Omringet (1960)
- Cold Tracks (1962)
- Om Tilla (1963)
- Vaktpostene (1965)
- Reisen til havet (1966)
- An-Magritt (1969)

== Sources ==
- Linn Ullmann (2001) Profession, director : Arne Skouen and his films (translation by Tiina Nunnally. Norwegian Film Institute) ISBN 9788280250032

Awards
Preceded by Rolf M. Aagaard	Recipient of the Narvesen Prize; 1980	Succeeded by Erling Borgen and John Olav Egeland
Preceded by Nils Johan Rud	Recipient of the Norsk kulturråds ærespris 1988	Succeeded by Espen Skjønberg
Preceded by Hanne Sophie Greve	Recipient of the Fritt Ord Award; 1996	Succeeded by Kåre Willoch
