= Fleksnes Fataliteter =

- Genre: Sitcom
- Created by: Bo Hermansson; Ray Galton; Alan Simpson
- Starring: Rolv Wesenlund; Aud Schønemann
- Country of origin: Norway
- No. of seasons: 6
- No. of episodes: 40 + 2 specials (list of episodes)

Production
- Running time: 30 minutes (1972 - 1982); 50 minutes (1988 - 2002)

Original release
- Network: NRK; SVT; DR
- Release: 27 January 1979 – 16 March 2005

Fleksnes Fataliteter, better known by its shortened title Fleksnes, was a Norwegian-Swedish-Danish television sitcom series produced between 1972 and 2002, created by Swedish writer Bo Hermansson and based on Galton and Simpson's scripts for the British series Hancock's Half Hour.

== History ==
The series was born when Swedish writer Bo Hermansson began translating the British comedy series Hancock's Half Hour in the early 70s, drawing attention from three different Nordic broadcasters, who eventually produced and aired the series together. The main dialogue is in Norwegian, but nearly all episodes featured guest stars from both Sweden and Denmark.

Fleksnes was only meant to be a single series of six episodes, but it became such a popular show in all three countries that it was immediately renewed for six more episodes. Its continued success eventually produced a total of six seasons over the span of thirty years. A movie Den Siste Fleksnes ("The Last Fleksnes") was made in 1974 as well, between the first and second series.

In 2002, Galton and Simpson wrote the script for one brand new Fleksnes episode, to celebrate the 30th anniversary of the first episode. When the entire series aired on NRK in Norway in 2002, there were over one million viewers on average each Saturday. In 2009, plans for a TV movie were announced for the next year, but as work progressed the plans were changed to a new series, which eventually became the Christmas series "Fleksnes Jr.", with one fifteen-minute episode airing every day from December 1 until Christmas Eve in 2010.

== Characters ==
- The main character, Marve Almar Fleksnes (Rolv Wesenlund), is a middleaged bachelor living alone, with his mother, called "Moder'n." (variant of "mom" in Norwegian) (played by Aud Schønemann) Marve can be seen as a typical working class Norwegian. Most of the humorous moments arise when the character Fleksnes expresses extraordinary opinions about life and when everything seems to go wrong despite his best intentions. He was born in 1936, and lived his entire life in Oslo. He died in 2001 after being struck by lightning, which also killed his mother and his long-time unknown brother, Gustav. He was played by Norwegian veteran comedian Rolv Wesenlund.
- Magnhild "Moder'n" Fleksnes, is the mother of Marve Fleksnes, and the second of the only two main characters in the show. She died in 2001 after being struck by lightning, along with her sons Marve and Gustav. She was played by Aud Schønemann.

== Episodes ==
For a list of episodes, see List of Fleksnes Fataliteter episodes.
