= Fjernsynsteatret =

20th-century department of the Norwegian Broadcasting Corporation

Fjernsynsteatret (transl. The Television Theatre) was a department of the Norwegian Broadcasting Corporation (NRK) that produced plays for television broadcasting. It opened in 1960 (after about a year of experimental operation) and operated until a major reorganisation of NRK occurred in 1990.

Its first leader was Arild Brinchmann, who headed the theatre from its start until 1967. Later directors were Tore Breda Thoresen from 1967 to 1980 and Magne Bleness from 1980 to 1990.

Fjernsynsteatret's first production was a play by Peter Brook, shown on April 8, 1959. During its first years, the theatre developed between twenty and twenty-five productions annually, and the performances were broadcast directly. Later developments saw a merge between theatre and film; the productions became more expensive, and the number of productions decreased significantly.

The theatre was replaced by NRK Drama in 1990.
