= Gleditsch =

Gleditsch is a surname. Notable people with the surname include:

- Bjørn Ole Gleditsch (born 1963), Norwegian businessperson and politician for the Conservative Party
- Ellen Gleditsch (1879–1968), Norwegian radiochemist and Norway's second female professor
- Henry Gleditsch (1902–1942), Norwegian actor and theatre director
- Jens Gran Gleditsch (1860–1931), Norwegian bishop and theologian
- Johann Friedrich Gleditsch (1653–1716), German book publisher
- Johann Gottlieb Gleditsch (1714–1786), German physician and botanist who investigated plant sexuality and reproduction
- Kristen Gran Gleditsch (1867–1946), Norwegian military officer and topographer
- Kristian Gleditsch, MBE (1901–1973), Norwegian civil engineer and geodesist
- Kristian Skrede Gleditsch (born 1971), Norwegian political scientist and Regius Professor at the University of Essex
- Nils Petter Gleditsch (born 1942), Norwegian sociologist and political scientist
- Nini Haslund Gleditsch (1908–1996), Norwegian political activist and advocate for peace
- Rolf Juell Gleditsch (1892–1984), Norwegian painter

Middle name:

- Eline Gleditsch Brustad (born 1994), Norwegian racing cyclist
- Jorunn Gleditsch Lossius (born 1980), Norwegian politician for the Christian Democratic Party

== See also ==
- Gletsch
- Glitch
