= Nini Haslund Gleditsch =

Norwegian activist (1908–1996)

- Born: Ingrid Margaret Haslund; 28 June 1908; Moss, Norway
- Died: 25 July 1996 (aged 88); Oslo
- Occupations: Secretary and editor
- Employers: Fram Forlag; Ministry of Foreign Affairs; Statistics Norway
- Organizations: Mot Dag; Bestemødre mot atomvåpen
- Known for: Political activist and advocate for peace
- Spouse: Kristian Gleditsch
- Children: Nils Petter Gleditsch

Nini Haslund Gleditsch (28 June 1908 – 25 July 1996) was a Norwegian political activist and advocate for peace.

== Personal life ==
Nini (née Ingrid Margaret Haslund) was born in Moss as the daughter of deputy education officer Johannes Emmanuel Haslund and Aagot Mathilde Løken. She married fellow Mot Dag activist and geodesist Kristian Gleditsch in 1934. They were the parents of Nils Petter Gleditsch. Her sister-in-law was Ellen Gleditsch, radiochemist and Norway's second female professor.

Nini Haslund Gleditsch died in Oslo in 1996.

== Career ==
=== Pre-war career ===
While working as a joiner's mate in Copenhagen in the late 1920s, she was part of the circle around the organization Clarté. She moved to Oslo as a student in 1930. In the early 1930s, she joined the leftist organization Mot Dag. She worked full-time with publishing house Fram Forlag, and contributed to the development of the workers' encyclopaedia Arbeidernes Leksikon. She participated in the Spanish Civil War from 1937 to 1939, by organizing international humanitarian aid.

=== World War II ===
During World War II, she participated in the flight of the Norwegian National Treasury to England in 1940, on the stage between Åndalsnes and Tromsø. She and her husband were responsible for the transport of two coffins of the "light luggage" (banknotes) by car from Åndalsnes to Molde. One third of the gold was sent with the British cruiser HMS Galatea from Åndalsnes to the United Kingdom, while 24 trucks brought the rest to Molde. Nini followed the transport of four truckloads of gold by ships from Molde to Tromsø, first part with the coastal steamer SS Driva, and later the ten tons of gold was distributed on smaller fishing vessels. During the transport, Driva was attacked by German bombers, but managed to escape from the bombs. She then worked for Minister Anders Frihagen at the Ministry of Trade in Balsfjord Municipality. When Terje Wold took over the Ministry, Haslund Gleditsch started working for Trygve Lie at the Ministry of Supply. She followed the British cruiser HMS Devonshire from Tromsø to Greenock in Scotland, along with part of the Norwegian Government and the Norwegian royal family. From 1940 to 1945, she worked as a secretary with the Ministry of Foreign Affairs at the Norwegian government-in-exile in London.

=== Post-war career ===
In the 1950s, while a housewife with young children, she was active in feminist organizations, and also co-edited the magazine Kvinnen og Tiden from 1953 to 1955. Along with her husband, she wrote the memoir book Glimt fra kampårene, published in 1954. She worked with the Statistics Norway (Norwegian: Statistisk Sentralbyrå) from 1960 to 1978. She was a co-founder of the political publishing house Pax Forlag in 1964. In her older days, she was active in the anti-nuclear organization Bestemødre mot atomvåpen (Grandmothers against nuclear weapons).

== Selected books ==
- Glimt fra kampårene. 1954. (with Kristian Gleditsch)
- Vær utålmodig menneske!. 1980.
