= Odd Gleditsch Jr. =

Norwegian businessperson (born 1929)

Odd Gleditsch Jr. (16 May 1929 – 25 December 2023) was a Norwegian businessperson.

He was born in Sandefjord as a son of Odd Gleditsch Sr. He was a second cousin once removed of Rolf, Ellen, Kristian and Henry Gleditsch.

He took his chemical engineering education in the United States. He was hired in his father's company Jotun Odd Gleditsch in 1953. He became CEO in 1967 and saw through a merger to form the company Jotun where he was CEO from 1972 to 1979. He was also chairman of the board from 1972 to 2000.
