= Henriette Bie Lorentzen =

Norwegian journalist, humanist and editor

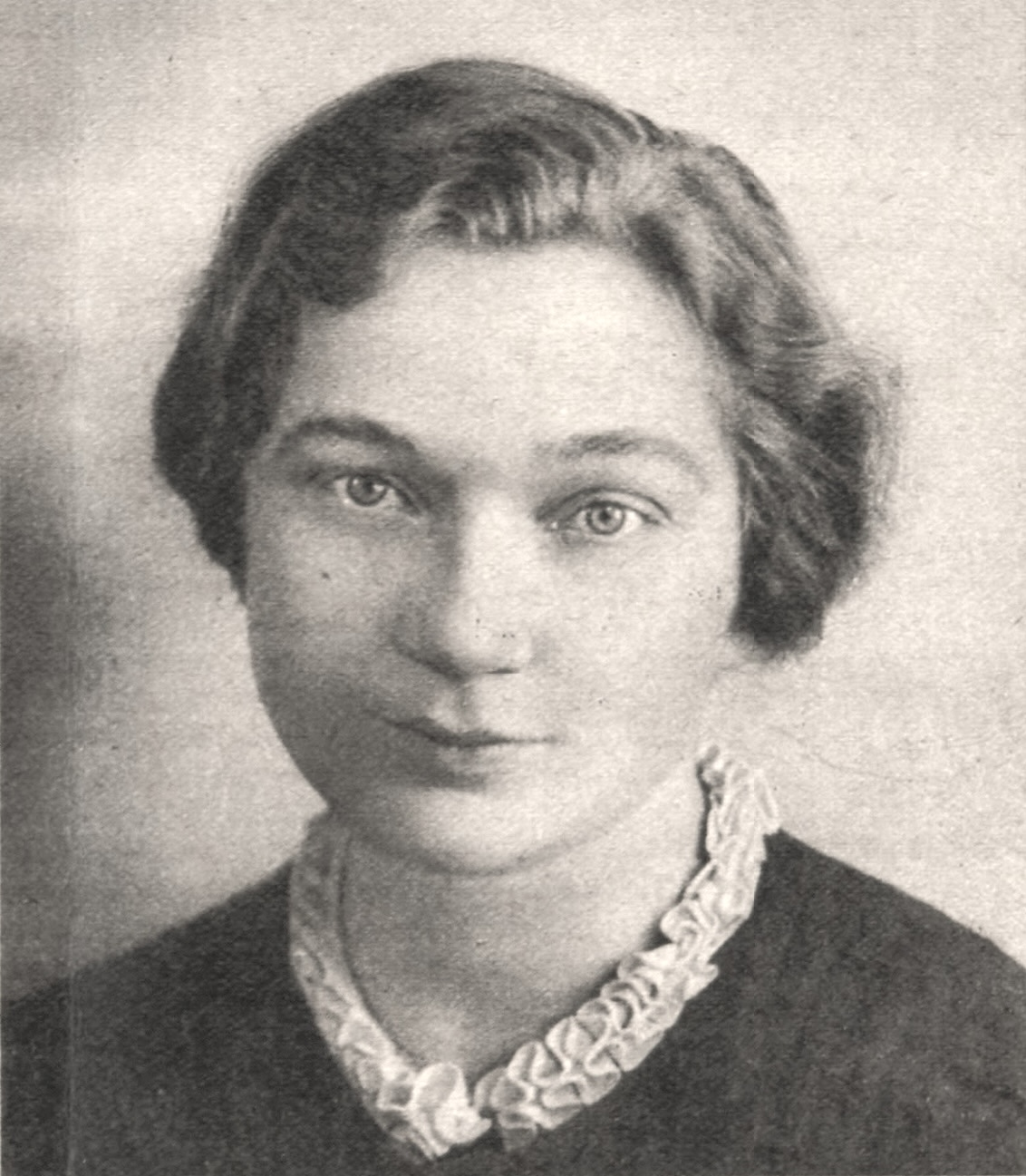
- Henriette Haagaas, 1939
- Born: Anna Henriette Wegner Haagaas; 18 July 1911; Vestre Aker
- Died: 23 August 2001 (aged 90); Oslo
- Occupations: Publisher and editor-in-chief

Henriette Bie Lorentzen (18 July 1911 – 23 August 2001), born Anna Henriette Wegner Haagaas, was a Norwegian journalist, humanist, peace activist, feminist, co-founder of the Nansen Academy, resistance member and concentration camp survivor during World War II, and publisher and editor-in-chief of the women's magazine Kvinnen og Tiden (1945–1955).

== Background ==
Born in Vestre Aker (now Oslo), Anna Henriette Wegner Haagaas was the eldest daughter of the private school owner Theodor Haagaas. She was married to the businessman and historian Øyvind Bie Lorentzen, a member of the Lorentzen family.

She earned the degree Magister in history of literature at the Royal Frederick University in 1937, with a dissertation on Henrik Ibsen and Christian Friedrich Hebbel.

== Humanism and the Nansen Academy ==
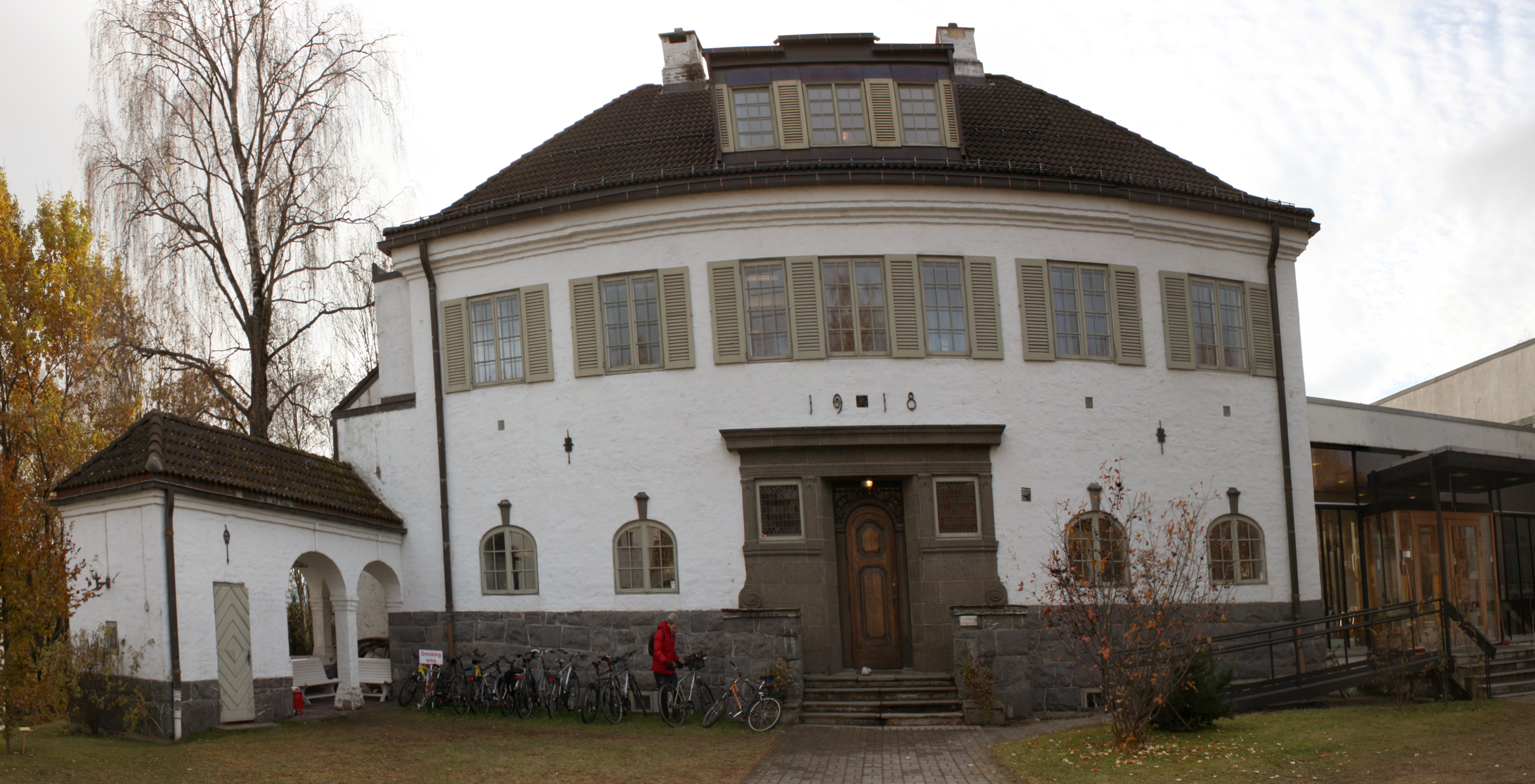
The Nansen Academy

She was introduced to the liberal theologian and humanist (and later Bishop of Hamar) Kristian Schjelderup by her fellow student Nic. Stang in the mid 1930s, and they became lifelong friends. She became involved in the establishment of the humanist Nansen Academy in 1937 and was one of its three original teachers, together with Schjelderup and Anders Platou Wyller, until it closed in 1940. She also succeeded Stang as assistant editor of Schjelderup's journal Fritt Ord in 1938, as the journal became the official publication of the Nansen Academy. According to Bjørn Egge, she was "the main practical force" in the establishment of the Nansen Academy.

The Nansen Academy was founded to promote the humanist philosophy in an era of totalitarianism on the right and left. Schjelderup and Wyller were both Christian humanists, while Bie Lorentzen was an agnostic, but they emphasized that humanism unites across religious lines. Bie Lorentzen lectured particularly on literature and women's issues. She also lectured extensively on humanism and the Nansen Academy around the country, and also lectured in local housewife associations and women's associations, believing it to be especially important for women and mothers who spent most of the time in the home to experience and learn something new. In May 1939, she initiated the Nansen Academy's first course—"What is humanism?"—aimed at women.

== Second World War ==
During the Second World War, she became involved, along with her husband and first cousin Henrik Groth, in the Norwegian resistance movement. She had herself met Adolf Hitler in a student pub in Germany in 1934 where Hitler was giving a speech.

In 1943, she was arrested and tortured by the Gestapo at Arkivet, even though she was pregnant, while her husband escaped to Sweden. The torture scene is reconstructed in the museum at Arkivet. She was then transferred to Grini detention camp. She was told her unborn child would be sent to Germany for forced adoption, and attempted to take her own life. As a result of the intervention of an anti-Nazi Austrian military doctor, her newborn daughter was instead given to her father and sister. As a Nacht und Nebel political prisoner, she was sent to Ravensbrück concentration camp where she remained until the end of the war. On 8 May 1945, she and around 100 other female Scandinavian concentration camp prisoners were rescued by the White Buses, and she was reunited with her husband in Sweden.

== Publisher of Kvinnen og Tiden ==
After returning from the concentration camp, she believed women should have a central role in rebuilding the country, and founded the women's magazine Kvinnen og Tiden (translated as Woman and Time in English) together with Kirsten Hansteen, the first Norwegian female member of cabinet. Bie Lorentzen and Hansteen served as joint editors-in-chief and publishers of Kvinnen og Tiden for ten years between 1945 and 1955.

Originally, the magazine was published by J.W. Cappelens Forlag, which was led by Bie Lorentzen's first cousin Henrik Groth, but Cappelen terminated the cooperation over Hansteen's communist background, and from 1947 it was published by a limited company owned by Bie Lorentzen and Hansteen, Kvinnen og Tiden AS, with significant financial support from the liberal Swedish politician and heiress Elisabeth Tamm, a member of one of Sweden's wealthiest families. She bequeathed her large fortune as well as Fogelstad Castle to the magazine and established a trust for this purpose with Bie Lorentzen, Hansteen, Gerda Evang, Eva Kolstad, Honorine Hermelin and a Swedish lawyer as trustees. Despite the support from Tamm, the circulation fell from a peak of 12,000 subscribers in 1947 to just 900 in 1955. Bie Lorentzen and Hansteen therefore decided to close the magazine, and asked Tamm to change her will.

Many of the most prominent female public figures of the postwar years served on the editorial board of Kvinnen og Tiden, among them Liberal Party leader and cabinet minister Eva Kolstad, women's rights activist Margarete Bonnevie, poets Inger Hagerup and Halldis Moren Vesaas, child psychiatrist Nic Waal, Labour cabinet minister Aaslaug Aasland, physician and women's rights activist Gerda Evang, and social psychologist Harriet Holter.

== Later life and legacy ==
From 1951 until her retirement in 1978, she worked as a lecturer in Norwegian language and literature as well as drama at the National Teachers College for Arts and Crafts, Oslo (now Oslo and Akershus University College). In the early postwar years, she was active in the Norwegian Association for Women's Rights, and she was also active in Amnesty Norway and the anti-nuclear organisation Bestemødre mot atomvåpen in the 1980s and 1990s. She chaired the Norwegian Ravensbrück committee for several years and was involved with the International Ravensbrück Committee.

She was interviewed in the film Mørketid – kvinners møte med nazismen (1994) by Karoline Frogner.

Also she received Oslo's highest award, the Medal of St. Hallvard, in 1995, for her educational work on women and peace. The Henriette Bie Lorentzen House at Oslo and Akershus University College (where the Faculty of Social Sciences is located) is named in her honour. In 2013, she was selected as one of the "100 most important women" in Norwegian history by the newspaper Verdens Gang.

Henriette Bie Lorentzen was featured, as one of three Norwegians (alongside Jens Christian Hauge and Vidkun Quisling), in the 2015 exhibition "1945 – Defeat. Liberation. New Beginning" of the German Historical Museum in Berlin on the end of the second world war in 12 countries. In his opening speech, Foreign Minister Frank-Walter Steinmeier said that Bie Lorentzen "after the war played a central role in rebuilding her home country Norway as publisher of the women's magazine Woman and Time. She developed the idea to create this magazine while imprisoned in Ravensbrück concentration camp near Berlin!"

== Publications ==
- Hebbel og Ibsen, 1937, mag.art. Dissertation in history of literature
- Barn i norsk diktning, 1957
- "Hver av oss kan gi sin skjerv til lyset," in Andreas Skartveit: Vi valgte det vi ikke kjente, Forum, 1995 (pp. 117–140)
- Autobiographical chapter in Kari Skjønsberg (ed.), Hvor var kvinnene? Elleve kvinner om årene 1945–1960, 1979, ISBN 8205120161

Translations

- Olga Knopf: Kunsten å være kvinne. Gyldendal Norsk Forlag, 1938
- Heinrich Mann: Den blå engel. Cappelen, 1939
- Benedikt Kautsky: Djevler og fordømte. Erfaringer og erkjennelser fra 7 år i tyske konsentrasjonsleirer, 1949
- Mieczysław Jastrun: Mickiewicz: Polens nasjonalskald, Frisprog, 1955 (with Kirsten Hansteen)

== Literature ==
- Lise Børsum: Fange i Ravensbrück, 1946
- Kristian Ottosen: "Henriette," in Kvinneleiren, pp. 126–133, Aschehoug, 1991
