= Kvinnen og Tiden =

Norwegian women's magazine

- Categories: Women's magazine
- Publisher: Kvinnen og Tiden AS
- First issue: 1945
- Final issue: 1955
- Country: Norway
- Language: Norwegian

Kvinnen og Tiden (meaning Woman and Time in English) was a Norwegian magazine for women published between 1945 and 1955.

== History and profile ==
Kvinnen og Tiden was started in 1945 with Henriette Bie Lorentzen and Kirsten Hansteen as publishers, editors-in-chief and owners. Originally, the magazine was published by J.W. Cappelens Forlag, which was led by Bie Lorentzen's first cousin Henrik Groth, but from 1947 it was published by a limited company owned by Bie Lorentzen and Hansteen, Kvinnen og Tiden AS, with significant financial support from the liberal Swedish politician and heiress Elisabeth Tamm, a member of one of Sweden's wealthiest families. Elisabeth Tamm considered the magazine as a successor of Swedish weekly women's magazine Tidevarvet. The first issue of Kvinnen og Tiden was published in December 1945, and the magazine reached a circulation of 12,000 in 1946.

The editorial board also included Aaslaug Aasland, Margarete Bonnevie, Gerda Evang, Inger Hagerup, Åse Gruda Skard, Halldis Moren Vesaas, Nic Waal, Harriet Bog, Eva Kolstad, Rønnaug Eliassen, Nini Haslund Gleditsch and Eva Rønnow.

The magazine treated a number of subjects from women's perspective, such as equal wages, tax issues, the maid's situation and kindergarten issues. It had columns for career guidance, jurisprudence and housing issues, as well as food recipes and letters from readers. A number of prominent women were portrayed, and essays treated women's writing, both classical and recent works. The magazine's contributors of imaginative literature included Torborg Nedreaas, Gunvor Hofmo, Solveig Haugan, Tor Jonsson, Tarjei Vesaas, Finn Havrevold, Jan-Magnus Bruheim, Aksel Sandemose and Johan Borgen.

In 1955 Kvinnen og Tiden ceased publication.
