= Sandefjord Upper Secondary School =

- Sandefjord videregående skole
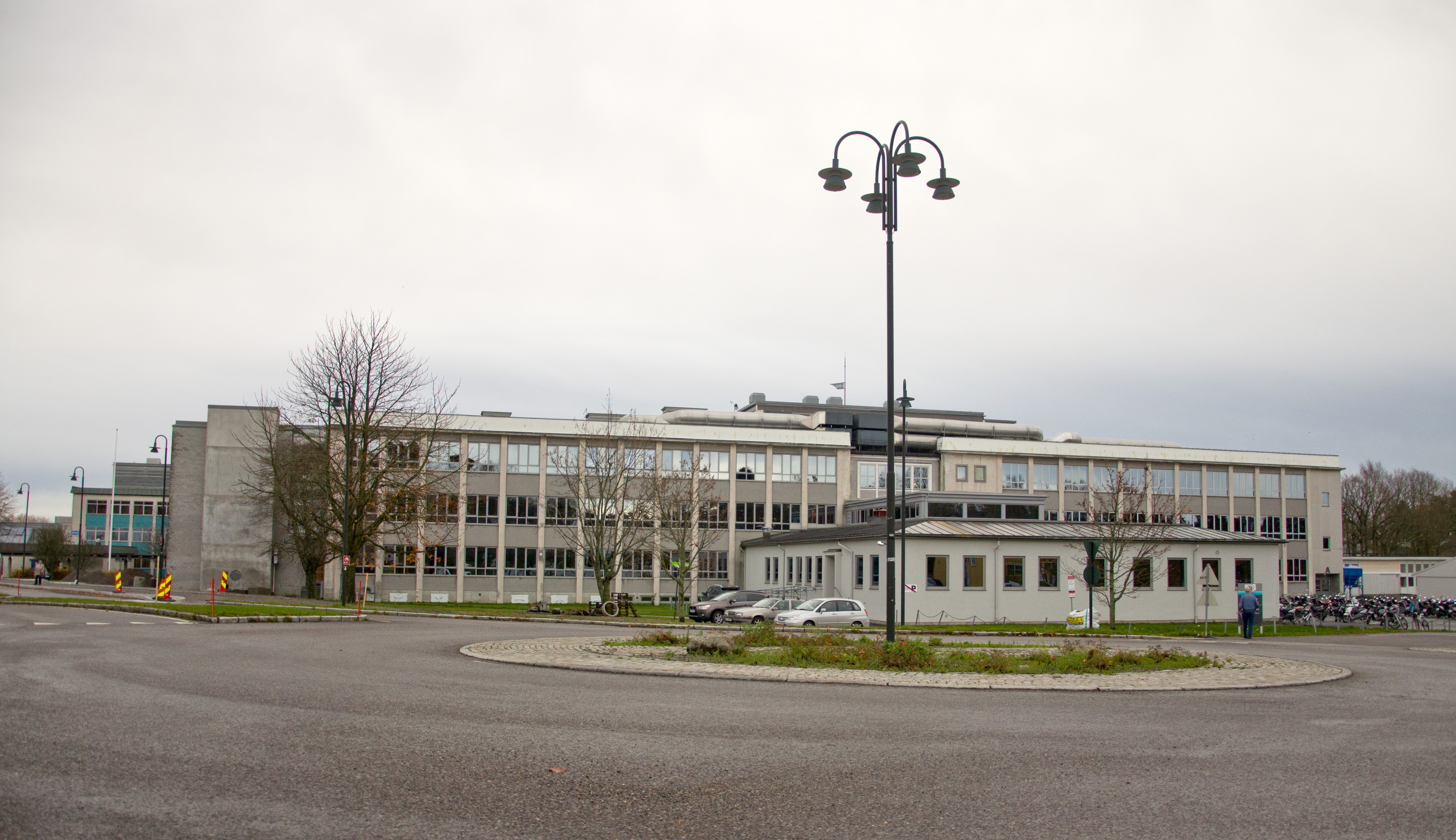

Location
- Krokemoveien 2-4; Sandefjord, Vestfold, 3214; Norway; 59°07′58″N 10°12′14″E

Information
- Other name: SVGS
- Former name: Sandefjord Gymnas
- Type: Public upper secondary school
- Motto: Norwegian: Mangfold og muligheter - hvor kunnskap og trivsel former din fremtid (Diversity and opportunities - where knowledge and prosperity shapes your future)
- Established: 1997
- Principal: Harald Møller
- Faculty: 350
- Age range: 16–19
- Enrolment: 2,100
- Language: Norwegian
- Campus size: 32,000 m^{2} (340,000 sq ft)
- Campus type: Suburban
- Accreditation: Department of Education and Science
- Yearbook: Årbok Sandefjord videregående skole
- Website: www.vfk.no/sandefjord-vgs
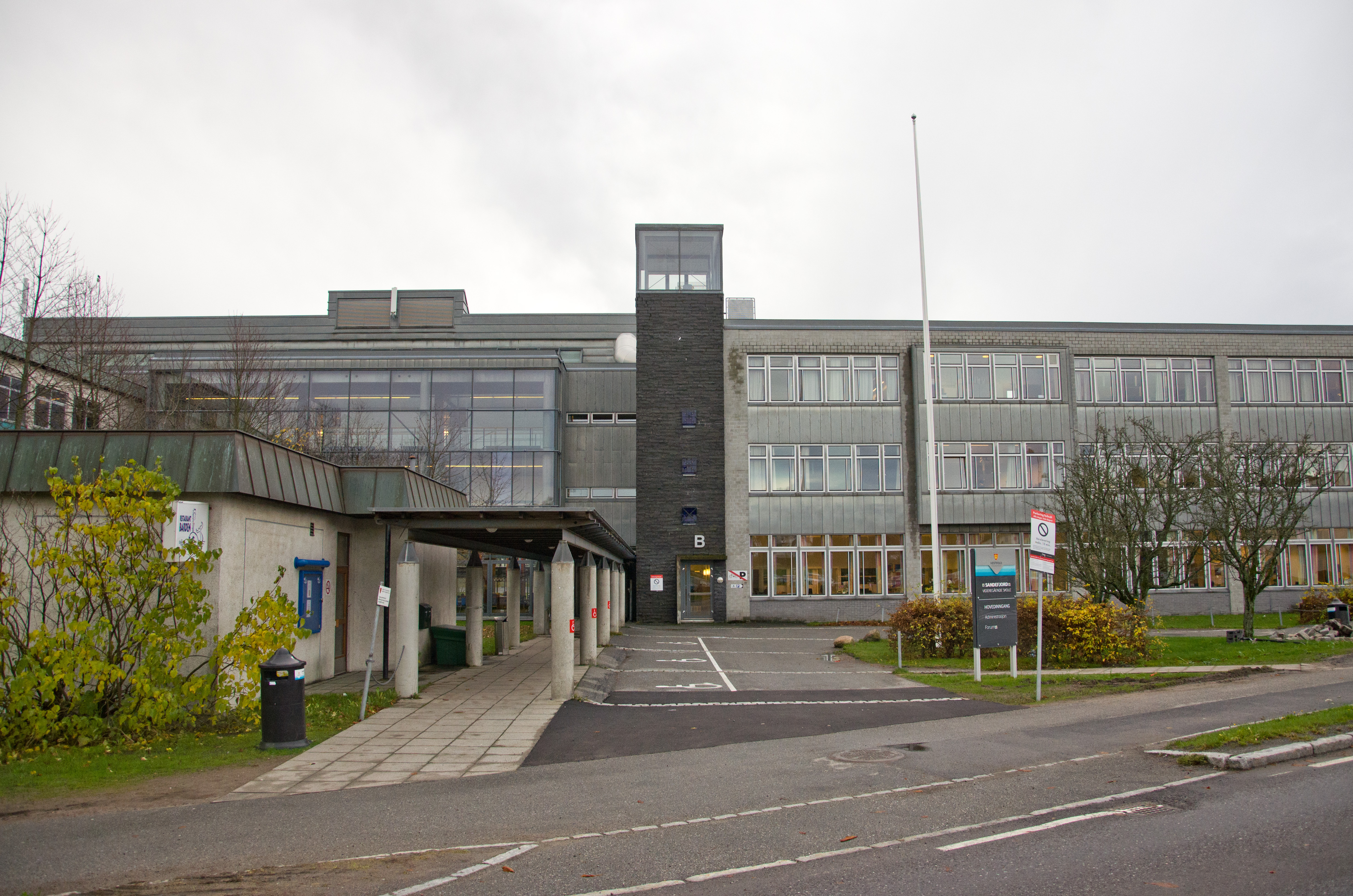

Sandefjord Upper Secondary School (Norwegian: Sandefjord videregående skole, often abbreviated to SVGS) is a public upper secondary school in the city of Sandefjord in Sandefjord Municipality in Vestfold county, Norway. It is the largest secondary school in Norway.

It is housed in two-story 32,000 m^{2} (340,000 sq ft) facilities, which are located at Krokemoa near Bugårds Park. It is an International Baccalaureate World School but it also offers general academics (the college preparatory studiespesialisering of the Norwegian school system), as well as elite sports, vocational education, and more.

It is located across the road from a Meny supermarket and is a few meters from Bugårdsparken. The school is home to several student-run businesses, including a bakery, hair salon and an eatery known as Restaurant Barden. The school has about 2,000 students and 350 employees.

== History ==
Sandefjord Upper Secondary School was established in 1997 when four schools merged to become SVGS:

- Sandefjord Gymnas (established as Sandefjord Høyere Allmennskole in 1885, renamed Sandefjord Gymnas in 1964)
- Sandar Videregående Skole (established as Sandar Yrkesskole in 1941)
- Sandefjord Kokk og Stuertskole (est. 1893)
- Sandefjord Handelsgymnas (est. 1917)

With over 2,000 students and nine branches of study, Sandefjord Upper Secondary School is very large by national standards. It is 120 kilometres (75 mi) southwest of Oslo in the Krokemoa area of Sandefjord. An early challenge was to unify the different schools under a single identity and to provide adapted learning for all students. The school offers general and vocational studies, and students of all branches are subject to the same organizational and administrative structure. From its beginning, it was realized that the new school may need help dealing with such a large and broad student body. The difficulty was aggravated by the need for new structures, each having specialized, course-related functions. The need for a social communal space was met with the construction of The Forum, a meeting place which consists of a dining area, bakery, cantina, bookstore, and a nearby library. The Forum has been described as the school's "base-camp of student services" and houses offices for follow-up services provided to school drop-outs. There is also a health service office, educational and career services, along a teachers' workshop.

As part of integrating vocational and general academics at Sandefjord Upper Secondary School, the school has established various curricular and extra-curricular opportunities for students. High quality and modern structures were made for specialized teaching branches, particularly for students in the music and athletic programs. Students are encouraged to become self-reliant by taking responsibility for environmental and enterprise links with the local business community in Sandefjord. The school's ICT project has been regarded as an important way of encouraging teachers of various subjects to work together to change teaching methods and modify student-teacher relationships.

Sandefjord Upper Secondary School emphasises student-centred learning and provides authentic experiences to students, illustrated, for example, by the school's close links to schools in Soweto in Johannesburg, South Africa. The bond between the schools has resulted in SVGS students volunteering for extended periods in Soweto. The South Africa project began in 1999 and offers the opportunity for students at SVGS to travel to Johannesburg to visit schools in Soweto. Students from Soweto also visit SVGS as part of the international project.

Students have been involved in a variety of projects, including the establishment of a soap factory which is located on campus. Student businesses include a bakery, butcher, physiotherapy, barber, and restaurant. The High School operates its bookshop and hires an on-campus priest as faculty. The school's library has a thousand visitors per day. The school's annual budget is 190,000,000 NOK, where 90 percent covers faculty salaries. SVGS has an exchange program with BASF in Ludwigshafen, Germany.

== Educational programs ==
Education Programmes for Specialization in General Studies:

- Specialization in General Studies: International Baccalaureate (IB)
- Programme for Sports and Physical Education
- Programme for Natural Science and Mathematics Studies
- Programme for Social Sciences and Economics Studies
- Programme for Language Studies
- Programme for Art, Design, and Architecture
- Programme for Music, Dance, and Drama
- Programme for Athletic Studies

Vocational Education Programmes:

- Service and Transport
- Electricity and Electronics
- Technical and Industrial Production
- Design, Arts and Crafts
- Restaurant and Food Processing
- Sales, Service, and Security
- Healthcare, Childhood and Youth Development

== Athletics ==
SVGS has two athletic programs: the Programme for Sports and Physical Education (Idrettsfag) and the Programme for Athletic Studies (Toppidrett). Classes are offered in sports such as association football, handball, basketball, volleyball, badminton, cross-country skiing, alpine skiing, ice skating, dancing, swimming, and floorball. Sports offered at the Programme for Athletic Studies also include tennis, orientation, rowing, golf, archery, martial arts, gymnastics, track and field, and underwater rugby. The school also uses facilities in nearby Bugårds Park for various sports. The school has a close corporation with Sandefjord Fotball, a professional football club, as well as Sandefjord TIF Handball and IL Runar.

== Notable alumni ==
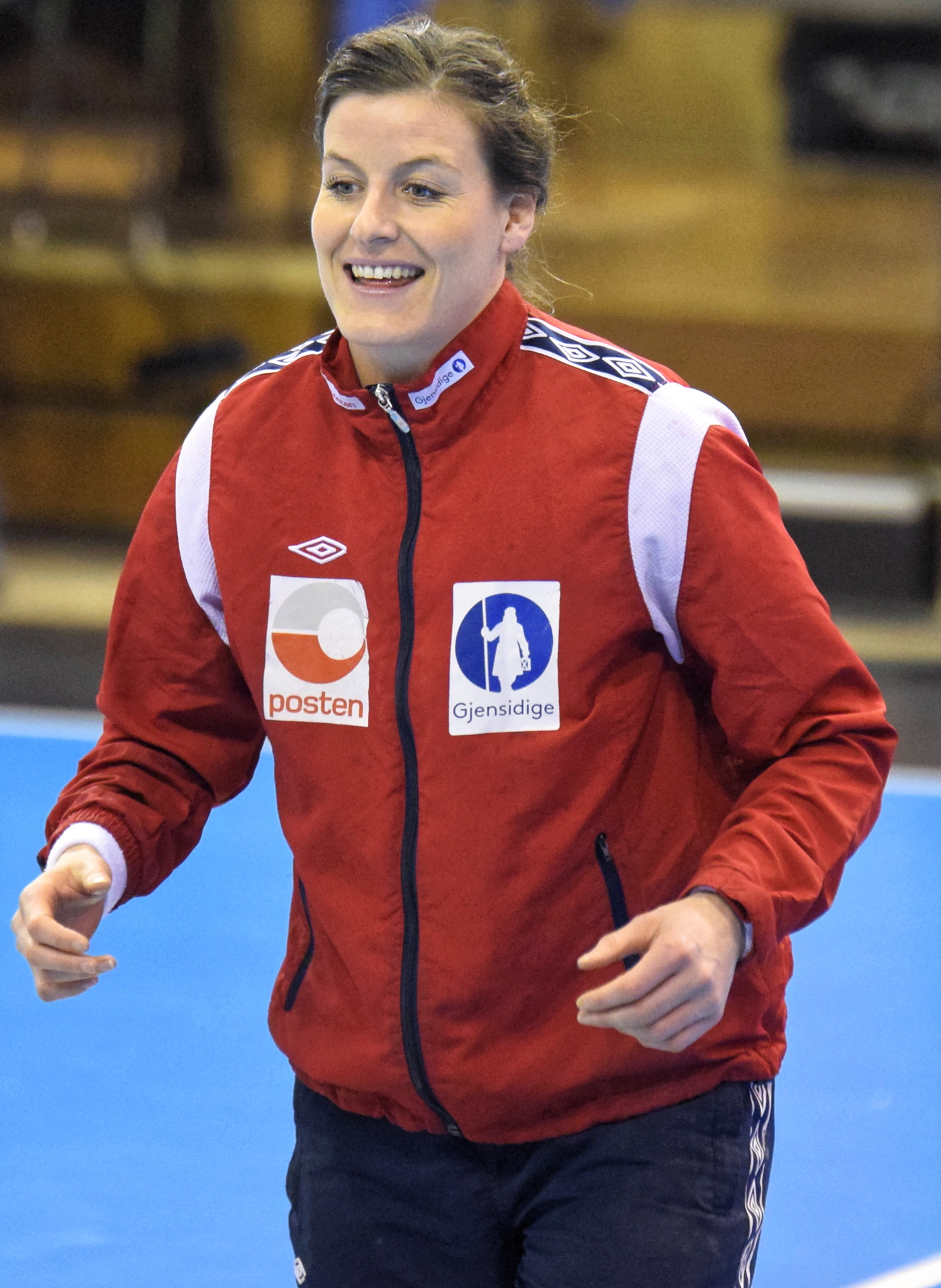
Olympic Gold Medalist Linn Kristin Riegelhuth.

- Espen Sandberg, film director
- Joachim Rønning, film director
- Sonja Mandt, politician
- Jonas Kilmork Vemøy, musician
- Linn-Kristin Riegelhuth Koren, handball player
- Einar Sand Koren, handball player
- Heidi Løke, handball player
- Bjørn Ole Gleditsch, current mayor of Sandefjord Municipality, Norway
- Frederic Hauge, head of the Bellona Foundation
- Lukas Zabulionis, musician
- Lise Davidsen, singer
- Mathias Stubø, musician
- Vadim Demidov, football player
- Per Mathisen, musician
- Geir Ludvig Fevang, football player
- Kevin Larsen, football player
- Mats Haakenstad, football player
- Ole Breistøl, football player
- Sofie Karoline Haugen, ice skater
- Tormod Bjørnetun Haugen, ice skater
- Simeon Thoresen, mixed martial artist
- Magnus Søndenå, handball player

== Notable faculty ==
- Øystein Havang, handball player
- Karl Erik Bøhn, handball player
- Hans Mathisen, musician
- Kristine Duvholt Havnås, handball player
- Roger Kjendalen, handball player
- Per Ramberg, former mayor of Sandefjord Municipality, Norway
- Gunnar Pettersen, handball player
- Tonje Larsen, handball player
- Olaf Alfred Hoffstad, former mayor of Sandefjord
