= Siv Benhafsi =

Norwegian novelist

Siv Benhafsi (born 1952 in Bergen) is a Norwegian novelist.

Benhafsi grew up in Porsgrunn, and she was educated as a nurse. She moved to France for the first time in the early 1970s as an au pair, and later resided there for periods. In the mid-1980s she moved to Algeria after marrying an Algerian sociologist.

Her debut novel Svart Paris ("Black Paris") issued on Pax (1987) was set in Paris. Her sophomore publication was the short story collection En mor i Alger, set in Algiers and also published on Pax (1994). It was reviewed in Verdens Gang ("die throw" of 4).
