= Kristian Gleditsch =

Norwegian civil engineer and geodesist

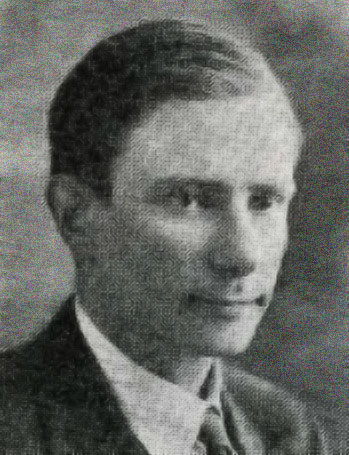
Kristian Gleditsch

Kristian Gleditsch, MBE (30 June 1901 – 7 April 1973) was a Norwegian civil engineer and geodesist. He served as and Director of the Norwegian Mapping and Cadastre Authority from 1945 until 1971.

== Background ==
He was born in Tromsøysund Municipality (now part of Tromsø Municipality) in Troms county, Norway. He was a son of headmaster Karl Kristian Gleditsch (1851–1913) and Petra Birgitte Hansen (1857–1913). His family moved to Trondhjem and then Fredrikshald in 1905. From 1913 he lived with his sister Ellen Gleditsch.

He was a nephew of Jens Gran Gleditsch and Kristen Gran Gleditsch, a first cousin of Henry Gleditsch and second cousin of Rolf Juell Gleditsch and Odd Gleditsch, Sr. In February 1934 he married fellow activist Ingrid Margaret Haslund (1908–1996), better known as Nini Haslund Gleditsch.

== Career ==
He took his examen artium in Kristiania (now Oslo) in 1919, enrolled at the Norwegian Institute of Technology and graduated as a civil engineer in 1923. He studied further in France until 1925. He worked for the Norwegian Mapping and Cadastre Authority (then known as Norges Geografiske Oppmåling) while studying, and when he returned to Norway in 1927 to work as a research assistant at the Norwegian Institute of Technology, he became a prominent member of the Student Society in Trondheim, Mot Dag and Clarté. He was also active in the Communist Party of Norway, but was excluded in 1929 because of his membership in Mot Dag.

He worked as an editor of science articles in the working class encyclopedia Arbeidernes leksikon from 1932 to 1936, and worked in the publishing house Arbeidermagasinet in the same period. From 1936 to 1937 he was a secretary for the Norwegian Support Committee for Spain, which sided with the Second Spanish Republic. He also chaired the Norwegian Students' Society in 1934 and 1937. From 1938 to 1940 he worked for the Norwegian Mapping and Cadastre Authority (then known as Norges Geografiske Oppmåling) in Aker and Oslo.

He had to leave Norway in 1940 due to the German occupation of Norway, and was among those who oversaw the flight of the Norwegian National Treasury. He settled in the United Kingdom with his wife, and worked in the Norwegian Ministry of Defence from 1940 to 1943 and for the Norwegian High Command from 1943 to 1945.

After the liberation of Norway in 1945, he was appointed director of the Norwegian Mapping and Cadastre Authority, a position he held until 1971. He also chaired the Norwegian Geographical Society from 1949 to 1953. He became involved in the Norwegian development aid project in Kerala, as chairman of the aid foundation Indiafondet from 1958 to 1962. A significant motivation for the project was to please the leftist opposition within the Labour Party in a time of NATO membership and increased spendings on defence.

Gleditsch was decorated with the Defense Metal and was declared a Member of the Order of the British Empire. He was decorated as a Commander of the Royal Norwegian Order of St. Olav in 1970. He died on 7 April 1973 in Oslo.
