= Owen Wilkes =

New Zealand peace campaigner

- Born: Owen Ronald Wilkes; 1940; Christchurch, New Zealand
- Died: 12 May 2005 (aged 64–65); Kawhia, New Zealand
- Occupation: Peace campaigner
- Children: 1

Owen Ronald Wilkes (1940 – 12 May 2005) was a peace campaigner and the founder of the Campaign Against Foreign Control of Aotearoa and the Anti-Bases Campaign, who was given a suspended prison sentence for espionage in Norway (the Wilkes/Gleditsch trial).

== Early life ==
The son of a grocer, Wilkes grew up in Christchurch, attending Christchurch West High School and Canterbury University. He worked as a field assistant for the Bishop Museum of Hawaii, on expeditions to Antarctica and the Kermadec Islands. He worked on archaeological digs led by ethnologist Roger Duff.

== Peace campaigning ==
He became politicised in the anti-war movement, which led to invitations to work for the International Peace Research Institute in Oslo and the Stockholm International Peace Research Institute. These activities led to the 1982 Wilkes/Gleditsch trial in Norway for compiling materials from open sources into materials judged to reveal national secrets. Wilkes received a suspended prison sentence, as well as a fine. On his return to New Zealand from Norway after the trial, he found his Punakaiki house had been pulled down for being erected without a permit. After Wilkes took up beekeeping near Karamea in 1983, it was discovered that Customs was cooperating with the SIS to monitor his international mail. Nothing threatening national security was ever found.

Wilkes was highly visible in New Zealand in the 1970s and '80s as the public face of the peace movement. He campaigned against installations at Black Birch, Mt John and Tangimoana in New Zealand; and links between the New Zealand military and foreign powers.

== Later life ==
In 1990 his only child Koa committed suicide while living in Christchurch, contributing to his retirement to Kawhia. After his retirement from the peace movement, he was active in the New Zealand Archaeological Association.

Having suffered bouts of depression all his life, he died by gassing himself in his car on 12 May 2005. He is commemorated by a park bench in Beckenham facing the Ōpāwaho / Heathcote River, near where he grew up.

== See also ==
- List of peace activists

== Publications ==
- Loran-C and Omega. A Study of the Military Importance of Radio Navigation Aids. (1987) Co-authored by N.P.Gleditsch
- The first New Zealand whole earth catalogue (1972) Edited by Owen Wilkes et al.
- A checklist of U.S. military research projects and installations in New Zealand (1971) Owen Wilkes.

=== Norwegian ===
- Onkel Sams kaniner – teknisk etterretning i Norge (1981) Co-authored by N.P.Gleditsch

=== Archaeology ===
- 1959 Wairau Bar. New Zealand Archaeological Association Newsletter 3(l):3–4.
- 1960 Site survey of west Nelson. New Zealand Archaeological Association Newsletter 4(1):22–31.
- 1962 Notes from Canterbury. New Zealand Archaeological Association Newsletter 5(2):110–111.
- 1964 Further work at South Bay. New Zealand Archaeological Association Newsletter 1(3):129–132,128.
- 1995 Site recording, site types and site distribution on the King Country coastline. Archaeology in New Zealand 38(4): 236–256.
- 1996 Review of F.L. Philips, Nga Tohu a Tainui: Landmarks of Tainui, Vol.2. Tohu Publishers, Otorohonga, 1995. Archaeology in New Zealand 39(2): 149–152.
- 1997a The Waikato site file: A stocktaking. Archaeology in New Zealand 40(1):33–39.
- 1997b. Archaeology in the Waikato: Some history. Archaeology in New Zealand, 40(2):143–158.
- 1998 Another look at stone structures near Mount Karioi. Archaeology in New Zealand 41(1): 65–74.
- 2000a. Excavation of a pa, R14/52 near Raglan: A Belated Report. Archaeology in New Zealand 43(1): 49–72.
- 2002b. Were moas really hunted to extinction in less than 100 years? Archaeology in New Zealand 43 (2): 112–120.
