= Johan Bryde =

Norwegian businessperson, ship owner & whaler (1858-1925)

Johan Bryde (June 1858 – May 1925) was a Norwegian businessman, ship owner and whaler. He helped establish a whaling station in the Colony of Natal. The Bryde's whale (Balaenoptera brydei) is named after him.

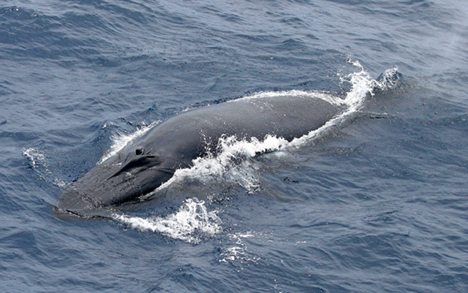
Bryde's whale was named after Johan Bryde

== Biography ==
Bryde was born at Laurvig in Vestfold, Norway. He was the son of Johan Maurits Bryde (1830–1899) and Karen Eriksen (1837–1914). He founded a shipping company at Sandefjord in 1890. Whaling was the foremost business in Sandefjord.

Later his cousin, Jacob Egeland (1864-1946) and Johan Bryde raised money to start their first whaling station in Durban. Egeland had arrived in Durban during 1880 and had developed interests in shipping, fishing, timber, and whaling. Their company was named 'The South African Whaling Company'. From 1908 Bryde managed whaling out of Southern Africa. In 1909, Jacob Egeland ended his partnership with Johan Bryde and started the Union Whaling and Fishing Company with another cousin Abraham E. Larsen.

Bryde is also known as owner of the oil mill Gimle Oljemølle and chemical factory Jotun Kemiske Fabrik at Gimle outside Sandefjord, both of which went bankrupt in 1925. The plants were purchased by Odd Gleditsch, Sr., who founded Jotun Kemiske Fabrik A/S in 1926.

== See also ==
- Norwegian South African

== Related reading ==
- Kirsten Alsaker Kjerland, Bjørn Enge Bertelsen (2014) Navigating Colonial Orders: Norwegian Entrepreneurship in Africa and Oceania (Berghahn Books) ISBN 9781782385400
