= Odd Gleditsch Sr. =

Norwegian businessman (1894–1990)

Odd Gleditsch Sr. (2 October 1894 – 17 January 1990) was a Norwegian entrepreneur and founder of the paint company Jotun. He was CEO of the company from 1926 to 1967.

== Personal life ==
Gleditsch was born in Sandefjord in Vestfold, Norway. He was a son of whaler Einar S. Gleditsch (1862–1913) and Maren Olea Kverne (1862–1933). He was a second cousin of Rolf, Ellen, Kristian and Henry Gleditsch, and a first cousin once removed of Kristen Gran Gleditsch and Jens Gran Gleditsch. He was the second cousin of Ellen Gleditsch, radiochemist and Norway's second female professor and Kristian Gleditsch.

In 1921 he married merchant's daughters Fanny Vibetoe (1900–1973). His son Odd Gleditsch Jr. took over the company leadership in Jotun, retiring as CEO in 1979.

== Career ==
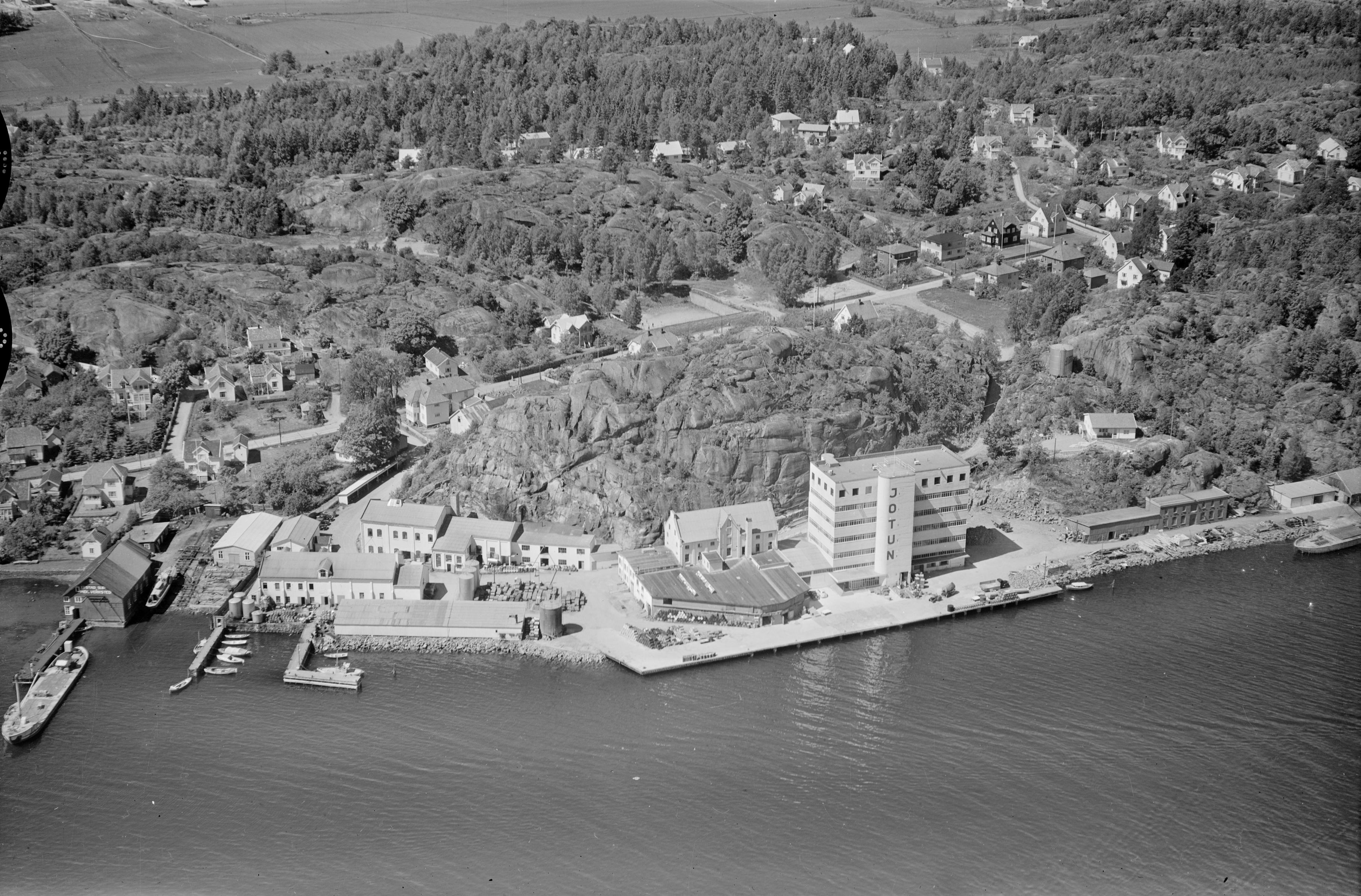
Aerial view of Jotun facilities in Sandefjord. (1947)

After finishing middle school he spent six seasons as a whaler in the Southern Ocean. Whaling was the foremost business in his hometown Sandefjord. However, during World War I stock market speculation became more lucrative. Gleditsch tried his luck from 1916, but the market crashed in 1918. In 1920 he opened shop as a colourman and seller of ship equipment. In 1926 he saw an opportunity to manufacture the paint he sold, as he took over the Jotun factory from Johan Bryde. The factory had gone bankrupt in 1925, but was now resurrected under the name Jotun Kemiske Fabrik.

In 1931, chemical engineer Dr. Manfred Ragg developed an anti-corrosive, rust-inhibiting product. Gleditsch purchased the patent rights to the product and Jotun introduced Arcanol as a reliable marine coating principally for shipowners. This started the upward trend for Jotun.

The company opened a research laboratory in 1950, and expanded with factories in the Kingdom of Libya in 1962 and Thailand in 1967. In 1967 Odd Gleditsch Jr. became CEO. Gleditsch Sr. continued as a board member until 1971. In 1972, through a merger, Jotun Kemiske Fabrik changed its name to Jotun.

Gleditsch was also a board member of the Federation of Norwegian Industries and Framnæs Mekaniske Værksted, chairman of Privatbanken i Sandefjord and the supervisory board of A/S Kosmos, and honorary member of the Norwegian Association of Hunters and Anglers. In 1965 he was decorated as a Knight, First Class of the Royal Norwegian Order of St. Olav. He died in January 1990 at Sandefjord.

== Related reading ==
- The Beginning of The Paint Business
