= Anine Kierulf =

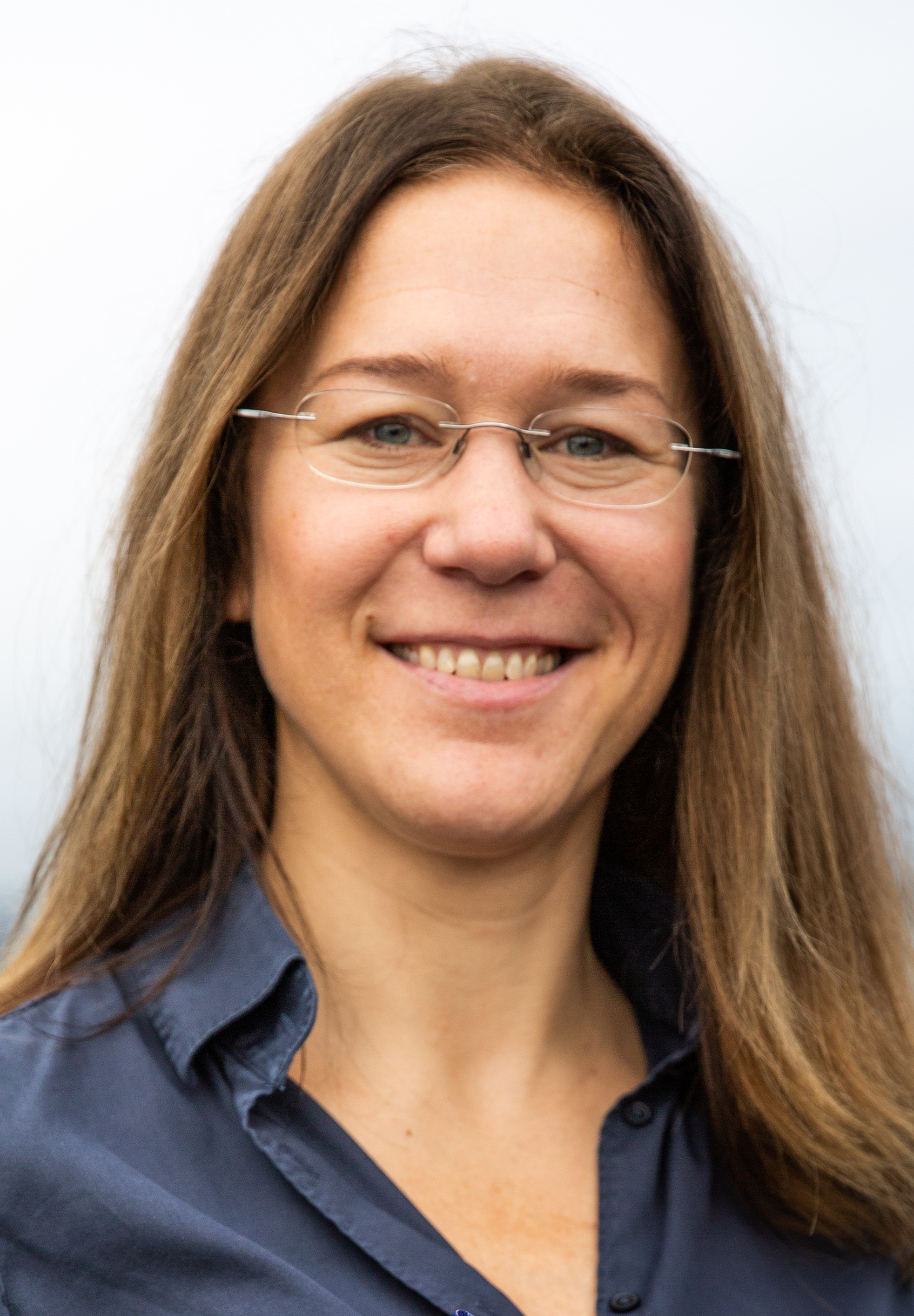
- Born: March 3, 1974 (age 52); Oslo, Norway

Philosophical work
- Era: 20th-21st century
- Region: Europe, US
- Main interests: Free Speech, Human Rights, Constitutional law

Anine Kierulf is professor of constitutional law at the University of Oslo Department of Public and International Law, and a special advisor to the Norwegian National human rights institution, where she was Research Director from 2017 to 2020. Her main areas of research are constitutional law, human rights and freedom of expression.

Kierulf holds a cand.jur. from the University of Oslo, an LL.M. from Northwestern University School of Law and a PhD from the University of Oslo. She was a visiting scholar at the University of Chicago in 2010, has worked as legal expert on freedom of expression to the Council of Europe, a senior lawyer in the Norwegian law firm Schjødt, and a judge at Ringerike City Court. She is a member of the Norwegian Academy for Language and Literature, and on the board of Fritt Ord. She has previously been on the boards of Pax Publishing, Dagsavisen, the Norwegian Cancer Society, Morgenbladet and the Council for DNT (Norwegian Trekking Association).

Anine Kierulf was awarded the 2013 "Voice of the Year" prize by the Norwegian paper Natt&Dag for being "an exemplary translator of legalese into the broader public debate, and for protesting against an insular and conflict-avoiding culture in academia". In 2015 she received the Norwegian Research Council's Award for Excellence in Communication of Science for her "ability to explain complex problems simply, clearly and concisely". She is a much used commentator on legal questions in Norwegian print and broadcast media, and is a columnist for Dagens Næringsliv.

Kierulf lives in Oslo with her husband, Rune Slagstad.

== Bibliography ==
- Freedom of Speech Abridged?, Anine Kierulf and Helge Rønning (eds.) Nordicom, 2009 ISBN 978-91-89471-76-4
- Høyesterett og Knut Hamsun, Anine Kierulf and Cato Schiøtz Gyldendal, (2004)
- Taking Judicial Review Seriously, PhD Dissertation, University of Oslo (2014) ISSN 1890-2375.
- Judicial Review in Norway - A Bicentennial Debate, Cambridge University Press (2018), ISBN 9781108617727.
- Rett frem, Fagbokforlaget (2020) ISBN 9788245035117.
- Hva er ytringsfrihet?, Universitetsforlaget (2021) ISBN 9788215047577.
