= Bjørn Ole Gleditsch =

Norwegian businessman and politician

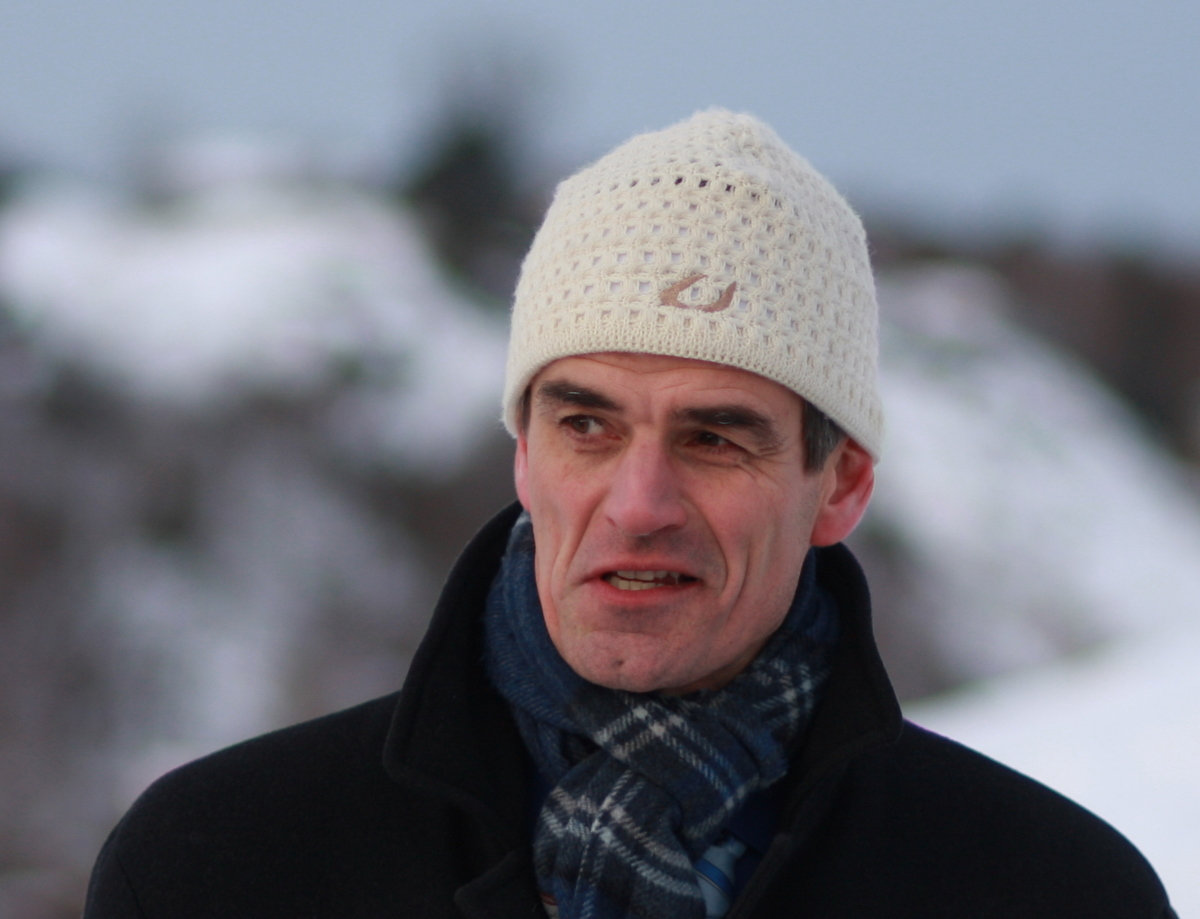

Mayor of Sandefjord Municipality
- Incumbent
- Assumed office 2003
- Preceded by: Per Foshaug

Personal details
- Born: Bjørn Ole Gleditsch; 13 January 1963 (age 63) Sandefjord, Norway
- Party: Conservative Party
- Education: Sandefjord Upper Secondary School

Bjørn Ole Gleditsch (born 13 January 1963) is a Norwegian businessperson and politician for the Conservative Party.

Since 2003 he is the mayor of Sandefjord Municipality. Before this he served several terms in the municipal council of Sandefjord Municipality.

Gleditsch is the richest mayor of any municipality of Norway. The grandson of Odd Gleditsch, he is an heir of the paint company Jotun. Through shareholding, he has a fortune of NOK 480 million, approximately 86.9 million U.S. dollars.

He is also a member of the board of Sandefjord Airport, Torp.
