= Nils Petter Gleditsch =

Norwegian sociologist and political scientist

- Scientific career
- Fields: Political Science, Peace and Conflict Studies
- Workplaces: Peace Research Institute Oslo

Director of Peace Research Institute Oslo
- In office 1971, 1977 – 1978
- Preceded by: Helge Hveem
- Succeeded by: Kjell Skjelsbæk

Nils Petter Gleditsch (born 17 July 1942 in Sutton, Surrey, Great Britain) is a Norwegian sociologist and political scientist. He is Research Professor at the Peace Research Institute Oslo (PRIO). In 2009, Nils Petter Gleditsch was awarded the annual Award for Outstanding Research by the Research Council of Norway. He won the Norwegian Sociological Association's Lifetime Achievement Award in 2018.

In 1982 he was convicted in Norway of a violation of the national security paragraphs of the penal code, in the Wilkes/Gleditsch trial. His prison sentence was suspended.

== Biography ==
Nils Petter Gleditsch is the son of Kristian Gleditsch and Nini Haslund Gleditsch, the nephew of Ellen Gleditsch, and the father of Kristian Skrede Gleditsch.

Following studies in philosophy and economy Gleditsch became mag.art. (PhD equivalent) in sociology at the University of Oslo. In 1966-67 he read sociology, social psychology and international relations at the University of Michigan in the United States. He graduated from the University of Oslo in 1968 with a master's degree.

In his thesis, The Structure of the International Airline Network, Gleditsch gave the earliest known definition of a centrality index for networks based on the reciprocals of distances: the centrality of a node is the average of the reciprocals of its distances to the other nodes, with the convention that the reciprocal of an infinite distance is zero, so that the index can be applied also to disconnected networks. This index is now known as harmonic centrality.

Since 1964, Gleditsch has been at the Peace Research Institute Oslo (PRIO), first as a student, later as researcher and research leader. He was Director of PRIO in 1972 and 1977–78. From 2002-2008 he led the working group 'Environmental Factors of Civil War' at PRIO's Centre for the Study of Civil War, appointed Centre of Excellence by the Research Council of Norway. Since 1993 he has also been Professor at NTNU. Gleditsch was editor of Journal of Peace Research 1983–2010, succeeded by Henrik Urdal. Gleditsch served as president for the International Studies Association (ISA) 2008–09.

He is a member of the Norwegian Academy of Science and Letters.
