= Synnøve Gleditsch =

Norwegian actress (1908–1980)

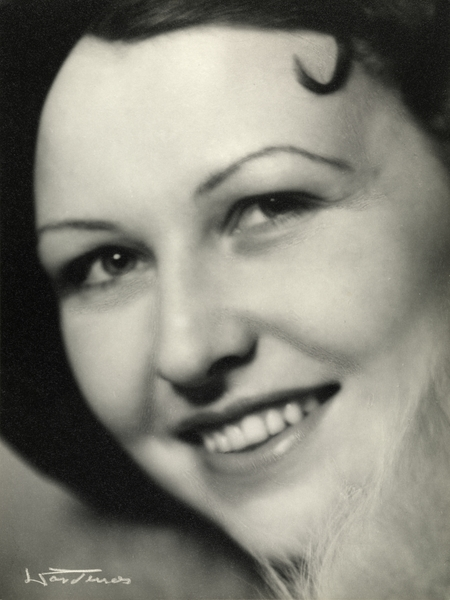
- Born: June 16, 1908; Agdenes, Norway
- Died: December 7, 1980 (aged 72)
- Occupation: Actress
- Spouse: Henry Gleditsch

Synnøve Gleditsch (née Synnøve Tanvik, June 16, 1908 – December 7, 1980) was a Norwegian actress.

== Life and work ==
Synnøve Gleditsch was the daughter of the arsenal manager Nils Tanvik (1872–1969) and Kristine Eian (1875–1925). She debuted at the National Theater in 1928, where she was engaged until 1932. After this, Gleditsch was engaged at the Søilen Theater from 1934 to 1935, the Trøndelag Theater from 1937 to 1942, and the Edderkoppen Theater from 1949 to 1953; during this time she also had guest performances at many other theaters. Gleditsch also worked as a cabaret and revue artist, including at Chat Noir.

During the Second World War, Synnøve Gleditsch had been scheduled to perform the song "Det skal lyse igjen over byen" (The Light Will Shine Again over the city) as the closing number in the Chat Noir revue Fra tid til annen in 1941. The state censorship body (Teaterdirektoratet), established by the occupying forces, intervened after the rehearsal and stopped further performance of the number. The song later became known under the new title "Norge i rødt, hvitt og blått" (Norway in Red, White, and Blue).

Synnøve Gleditsch was married to Henry Gleditsch from 1932 to 1942, when he was executed by the Germans.

In the 1960s, Gleditsch worked at NRK's Television Theater. She made a name for herself in roles such as Lady Teazle in Henki Kolstad's Baktalelsens skole, Svanhild in Henrik Ibsen's Love's Comedy, Eliza in George Bernard Shaw's Pygmalion, Lavinia in Nils Kjær's Det lykkelige valg, and Adele in Johann Strauss's Die Fledermaus.

In addition to theater, she participated in 13 film and TV productions between 1949 and 1970. She made her film debut in the Norwegian version of Vi flyr på Rio.

== Filmography ==
- 1949: Vi flyr på Rio as Helmer's mother
- 1954: Aldri annet enn bråk as Mrs. Wang
- 1954: I moralens navn as Ella Heymann, Otto's wife, Egil's mother
- 1956: Ektemann alene as the office woman
- 1960: Venner as a servant at the Smidt house
- 1960: Veien tilbake as Jenny
- 1962: Tonny
- 1965: Skjær i sjøen Mrs. Ås, Marit's mother

== NRK Television Theater ==
- 1961: Den store barnedåpen as Miss Jahr
- 1961: Mester Pierre Pathelin as Giullemette, Pathelin's wife
- 1963: Kranes konditori as Gudrun Buck
- 1969: Huset på grensen as the mother-in-law
- 1970: Selma Brøter as the boarding house operator
