= Tor Bjerkmann =

Norwegian magazine editor and publisher

- Born: 5 February 1939; Mysen, Norway
- Died: 14 April 1999 (aged 60)
- Occupation: Publisher

Tor Bjerkmann (5 February 1939 – 14 April 1999) was a Norwegian magazine editor and publisher.

== Biography ==
Bjerkmann was born at Mysen in Østfold, Norway. He grew up in the neighborhood of Bjølsen in Oslo and graduated from Fagerborg School in 1956 and from the State Library School in 1962. He was first employed by J.W. Cappelens Forlag. Bjerkmann chaired the publishing house Pax Forlag during its first eight years from 1964 to 1972. From 1978 to 1986 he was manager of the publishing house Universitetsforlaget.
