= Rune Slagstad =

Norwegian philosopher (born 1945)

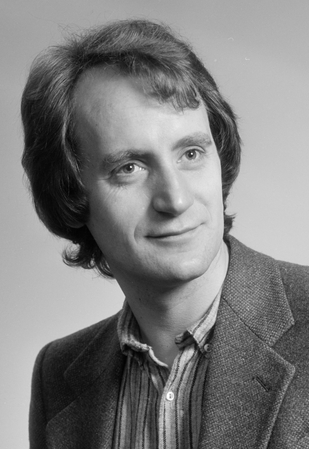
- Slagstad in 1980
- Born: 22 February 1945 (age 80); Bergen, Norway
- Era: 20th century
- Region: Western philosophy

Rune Slagstad (born 22 February 1945) is a Norwegian historian, philosopher, legal theorist, professor and journal editor. In addition to professional work, he has since the late 1960s contributed actively to public debate on a variety of issues from Norway.

== Biography ==
Slagstad was editor of Pax Publishing (1971–1978) and the Norwegian University Press (1986–1989). He has held tenured professorships both at the University of Oslo, the Norwegian Institute for Social Research and Oslo University College and headed The Research Council of Norway Program on Governance and Democracy ("LOS") (1990–1998).

He initiated and co-edited the encyclopedia PaxLeksikon (with i.a. Hans Fredrik Dahl and Jon Elster), co-edited the leftist journal Kontrast, and was editor-in-chief of the intellectual journal Nytt Norsk Tidsskrift from 1984 through 2009. Among his significant publications are the books Constitutionalism and democracy (co-edited with Jon Elster), De nasjonale strateger (”National strategists”), Rettens ironi (”The Irony of Law”) and Sporten: en idéhistorisk studie (”Sports”), a study of sports from a cultural historical point of view.

Slagstad has been a member of the Norwegian Academy for Language and Literature (1996-), the Norwegian Academy of Science and Letters (2002-), and on the board of Morgenbladet (2003–2009) and The Danish-Norwegian Foundation (1998-). He was one of the founders of the Norwegian Socialist Left Party (est. 1975), in which he through the 1970s also held several leading positions.

From 2009 to 2013, Slagstad held a professorship at the Centre for the Study of Professions at Oslo University College. He is currently at The Institute for Social Research working on a study of Scandinavian social-democratic sittlichkeit.

Slagstad was born and raised in Bergen, but now lives in Oslo with his wife Anine Kierulf. He has three children.

He was named Norway's leading intellectual by the daily newspaper Dagbladet in 2005. In 1996 he received the Fritt Ord Honorary Award.

== Musician ==
In 2006 he played flute in the church service for Jens Chr Hauge—a rendition of traditional folk tune "Jeg lagde mig saa sildig".

== Bibliography ==
- 2019 Spillet om Ullevål sykehus - et doldisbyråkratisk lærestykke, Pax, ISBN 978-82-530-4152-0
- 2019 Carl Schmitt - Et antiliberalt tema med variasjoner, Pax, ISBN 978-82-530-4024-0
- 2019 Hannah Arendt - Politikk i dystre tider, Pax, ISBN 978-82-530-4025-7
- 2018 Da fjellet ble dannet, Dreyer, ISBN 978-82-8265-437-1
- 2017 Banens beste, Pax, ISBN 978-82-530-4028-8
- 2017 Lærdom som lidenskap, Fagbokforlaget, ISBN 978-82-450-2165-3
- 2015 Tilløp til offentlighet, Pax/Manifest, ISBN 978-82-530-3789-9
- 2012 Spadestikk, Fagbokforlaget, ISBN 978-82-450-1287-3
- 2010 Elster og sirenenes sang Pax, ISBN 978-82-530-3273-3
- 2008 (Sporten): en idéhistorisk studie Pax, ISBN 978-82-530-3095-1
- 2005 Utvalgte polemikker ISBN 82-530-2793-1
- 2001 Rettens ironi, ISBN 82-530-2337-5
- 2000 Kunnskapens hus. Fra Hansteen til Hanseid, ISBN 82-530-2234-4 (2. ed. 2006 ISBN 978-82-530-2920-7)
- 1998 De nasjonale strateger ISBN 82-530-2024-4 (2. ed. 2001 ISBN 82-530-2336-7)
- 1988 Constitutionalism and democracy with Jon Elster ISBN 0-521-34530-8
- 1987 Rett og politikk: et liberalt tema med variasjoner (2. ed) ISBN 82-00-07470-6)
- 1980 Positivisme og vitenskapsteori: et essay om den norske positivismestridenISBN 82-00-01966-7
- 1976 Positivisme, dialektikk, materialisme (ed.)

== Sources ==
- Registered publications in BIBSYS
- Registered publications in FRIDA
