= Kristian Skrede Gleditsch =

Norwegian political scientist

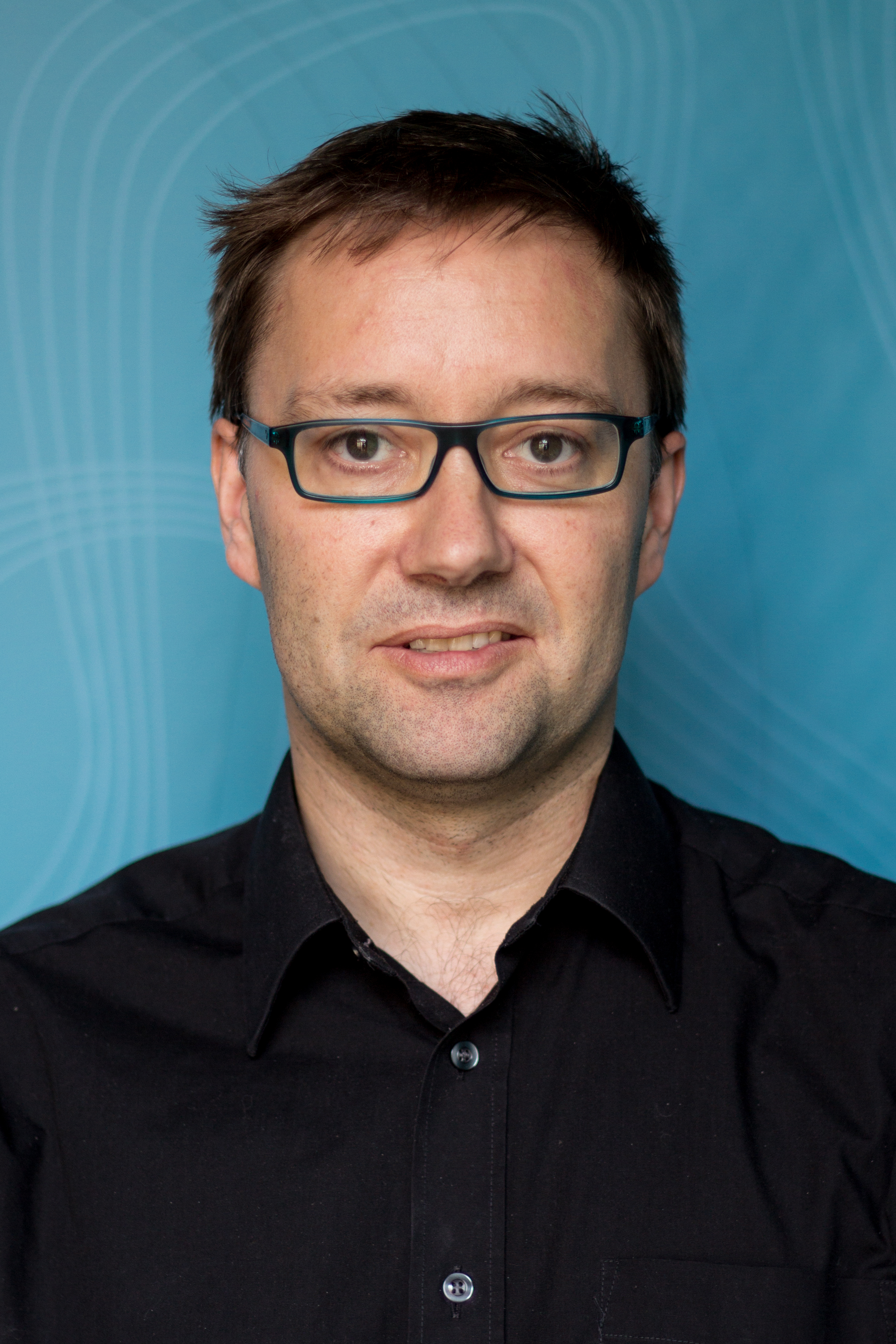
- 2013
- Born: 9 October 1971 (age 54); Norwegian
- Education: University of Oslo; University of Colorado Boulder
- Known for: international politics, peace research
- Awards: Helen Dwight Reid Award, Regius Professor
- Scientific career
- Fields: Political Science
- Workplaces: University of Essex; Peace Research Institute Oslo
- Doctoral advisor: Michael D. Ward
- Website: http://ksgleditsch.com

Kristian Skrede Gleditsch FBA (born 9 October 1971 in Oslo, Norway) is a Norwegian political scientist and a professor at the University of Essex, holding the title of Regius Professor. His main fields of research are on the topics of conflict, democratization and non-violent mobilization.

== Education and career ==
Gleditsch holds a cand.mag. degree from the University of Oslo (1993), and a PhD in political science from the University of Colorado (1999). He was a researcher at the University of Glasgow and the University of California San Diego before moving on to Essex in 2005. Since 2003 he has also held a minor position at the Peace Research Institute Oslo (PRIO) and in 2007-2011 he received a major "Young Excellent Researcher" grant from the Research Council of Norway. In 2013, he received a Starting Grant from the European Research Council.

Gleditsch is one of the editors of Research and Politics (2015- ) and has previously been co-editor of the British Journal of Political Science (2010-2013). He is member of the editorial boards of several other academic journals.

He is a member of the board of the American Political Science Association (2016-2019) and has headed the Conflict Processes Section (2014-2016). He has held a number of positions in the International Studies Association, of which he was President 2021-22 and Vice President 2013–2014.

== Awards ==
He has received several prizes and distinctions for his scientific work, including the Helen Dwight Reid Award from the American Political Science Association for best dissertation in the field of international relations, law, and politics in 2000. He also received the Karl Deutsch award for young researchers within international politics and peace research, awarded by the International Studies Association in 2007.

In 2017, Gleditsch was appointed as a Regius Professor at the University of Essex, the only such appointment for a professor of political science. He was elected a Fellow of the British Academy in 2024.

== Personal life ==
Kristian Skrede Gleditsch is the son of Kari Skrede and Nils Petter Gleditsch, and is married to Theodora-Ismene Gizelis.

== Selected bibliography ==
- Kristian Skrede Gleditsch: All International Politics Is Local. The Diffusion of Conflict, Integration, and Democratization. Ann Arbor, Michigan: University of Michigan Press (2002).
- Ward, Michael D. & Kristian Skrede Gleditsch. Spatial Regression Models. In the series Quantitative Applications in the Social Sciences. Thousand Oaks, California: Sage (2008).
- Cederman, Lars-Erik; Kristian Skrede Gleditsch, & Halvard Buhaug. Inequality, Grievances, and Civil War. Cambridge: Cambridge University Press (2013).
