= Wilkes/Gleditsch trial =

Trial in Norway

The Wilkes/Gleditsch trial (Norwegian: Wilkes/Gleditsch-saken) in 1982 in Norway, concerned publication of a report by two researchers of peace and conflict studies on electronic listening stations, based on information from open sources. Putting the information together to make a complete picture was deemed to reveal a secret, according to puslespill legal doctrine, cf the website of Norway's Cabinet in 2011.

Electronic listening posts in North-Norway, and their significance, was the secret that was revealed. (The Wilkes/Gleditsch case has been confused with the "Loran C affair", which involved publication of the existence of a radiowave-transmitter used for navigation.)

Owen Wilkes and Nils Petter Gleditsch were convicted of breaching paragraphs 90 and 91 of the Danish Penal Code, the Norwegian criminal code, pertaining to national security. They each received a suspended prison sentence, in addition to being fined and charged with court costs.

== Names ==
The trial has various other names in Norwegian, including "Gleditsch-saken", "Gleditsch/Wilkes-saken", and "kaninsaken" (the rabbit trial).
