= Erling Falk =

Norwegian politician (1887–1940)

- Born: 12 August 1887; Hemnesberget, Norway
- Died: 31 July 1940 (aged 52); Stockholm, Sweden
- Resting place: Vestre gravlund, Oslo, Norway
- Occupation: Politician
- Political party: Communist Party of Norway (1926-1928); Arbeiderpartiet (-1925)
- Parent: Jonas Cornelius Falk

Erling Falk (12 August 1887 – 31 July 1940) was a Norwegian politician, ideologist and writer. He was active in the Norwegian Students' Society, the Norwegian Labour Party and the Communist Party, but is best known as a leading figure in the group Mot Dag, who issued a periodical of the same name. He also translated Das Kapital.

== Early life and career ==
He was born in Hemnesberget as the son of Jonas Cornelius Falk (1844–1915) and Anna Margrethe Middelthon (1857–1924). Falk attended school in Trondheim (1901), Mosjøen (1903) and high school in Stavanger (1905) before he moved to Duluth, Minnesota in 1907. In the United States he undertook varying forms of work and short-lived studies, including working as a land surveyor in Montana and as an accountant for Industrial Workers of the World in Chicago.

== Mot Dag ==
In 1918 he moved back to Norway, and enrolled at the Royal Frederick University. From 1921 he edited a new periodical called Mot Dag, which he published together with people he met in a study circle led by Edvard Bull. In addition to Falk, prominent figures in the early Mot Dag were Viggo Hansteen, Trond Hegna, Aake Anker Ording and Arne Ording. Sigurd Hoel soon joined the group as editor of Mot Dag. In 1922 a parallel association, also named Mot Dag, was established.

Falk had joined Kristiania Arbeidersamfund and the Norwegian Students' Society after moving to Norway, and was also a member of the Norwegian Labour Party. Together with Martin Tranmæl Falk was instrumental in writing the Kristiania Proposal in early 1923, which stated that the Labour Party should strive for independency from the Comintern. The Comintern did not take lightly to this, and Falk was present to discuss the issue at the 3rd Enlarged Plenum of Executive Committee of the Communist International in June 1923. The Labour Party resigned from Comintern at its extraordinary national convention in November 1923. At that convention, Falk tried to challenge Tranmæl as editor-in-chief of the party newspaper Arbeiderbladet, but received few votes in his favor. Falk remained with the Labour Party for some time, but was excluded from the party in 1925. At the same time, the Labour Party disassociated itself with the entire Mot Dag group. Falk then formed the group Arbeideropposisjonen, but it too was excluded, and became short-lived.

In 1926 Mot Dag and Falk joined the Communist Party. Falk was a member of the party's central board, and had influence in the newspaper Norges Kommunistblad. He also influenced the founding of the short-lived party Arbeiderklassens Samlingsparti. In 1928 he was a part of the 6th World Congress of the Comintern in Moscow, but Falk and Mot Dag left the Communist Party in 1928.

Around the same time Falk also lost influence in the Norwegian Students' Society, due to having embezzled money from a construction fund reserve. Money was among others needed to run the publishing house Fram Forlag. After the Great Depression in 1929, Falk translated Karl Marx's Das Kapital to Norwegian, and wrote the book Hvad er marxisme? (What is Marxism?) in 1937. From 1933 he participated in creating the workers' encyclopedia Arbeidernes Leksikon. However, by the mid-1930s he needed a lighter workload due to declining health. His activity in Mot Dag declined from the autumn of 1935, which in part led to the dissolution of Mot Dag in June 1936. In contrast to most of the other members he did not rejoin the Labour Party, as the party chose to uphold his exclusion. One day before the German invasion of Norway in April 1940, Falk left the country for Stockholm to undergo brain surgery. He had two surgeries, but died on 31 July 1940. He was buried at Vestre gravlund in Norway.
