= Kirsten Hansteen =

Norwegian politician

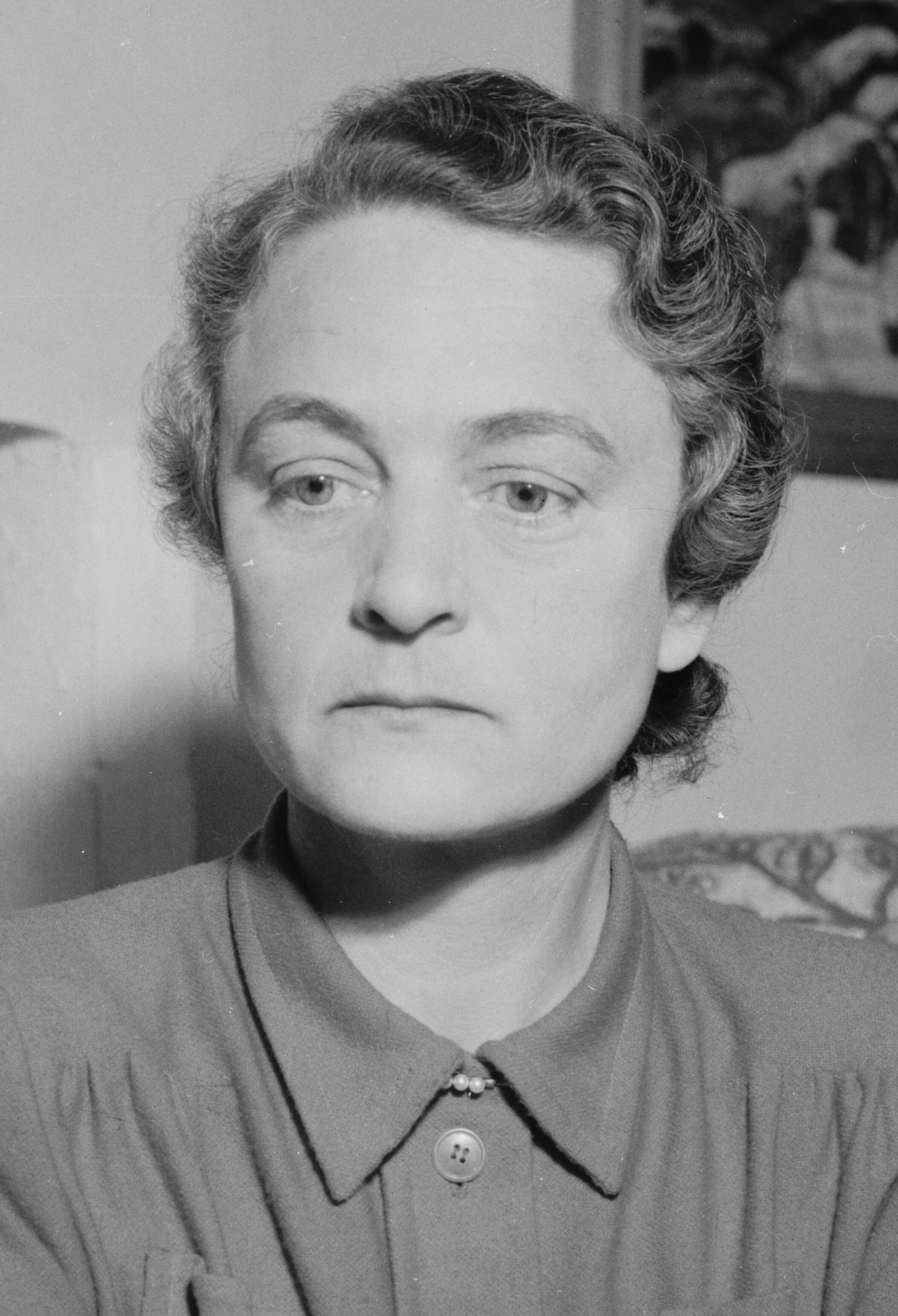

Consultative Minister of the Ministry of Social Affairs
- In office 25 June 1945 – 5 November 1945
- Prime Minister: Einar Gerhardsen
- Minister: Sven Oftedal
- Succeeded by: Aaslaug Aasland

Personal details
- Born: 5 January 1903 Lyngen, Troms, Norway
- Died: 17 November 1974 (aged 71) Oslo, Norway
- Party: Communist Party of Norway
- Spouse: Viggo Hansteen (1900-1941)
- Education: University of Oslo
- Profession: writer, editor, librarian

Kirsten Hansteen (5 January 1903 – 17 November 1974) was a Norwegian editor and librarian. She was appointed Minister of Social Affairs with Gerhardsen's First Cabinet in 1945 and was the first female member of cabinet in Norway.

== Biography ==
She was born in Lyngen Municipality in Troms county, Norway. Her parents were Ole Christian Strøm Moe (1866–1907) and Gerda Sophie Landmark (1871–1934). Her father died when she was only four years old, and her mother moved her five children to Kristiania (now Oslo). She graduated artium in 1921 and later studied German and Norwegian at the University of Oslo.

In 1930, she married attorney Viggo Hansteen (1900-1941). Her husband was executed in 1941 during the Occupation of Norway by Nazi Germany. She edited the underground resistance and feminist paper Kvinnefronten (The Women's front) during the German occupation.

After the liberation of Norway at the end of World War II, she co-founded the journal Kvinnen og Tiden with Henriette Bie Lorentzen (1911–2001). Lorentzen and Hansteen served as joint editors-in-chief of the journal which was in publication from December 1945 until 1955. Kirsten Hansteen was also a Member of the Norwegian Parliamentary from Akershus as a representative of the Communist Party of Norway from 1945 to 1949. Between 25 July and 5 November 1945, she served as Consultative Councillor of State in the Ministry of Social Affairs under Prime Minister Einar Gerhardsen. From 1959, Kirsten Hansteen worked at the University of Oslo Library as a librarian until she retired in 1970. She died during 1974 in Oslo.

== Other sources ==
- Commire, Anne, ed. (2002). "Hansteen, Kirsten (1903–1974)". Women in World History: A Biographical Encyclopedia. Waterford, Connecticut: Yorkin Publications. ISBN 0-7876-4074-3. Archived from the original on 24 September 2015 – via HighBeam Research.
