= Rolf Juell Gleditsch =

Norwegian painter (1892–1984)

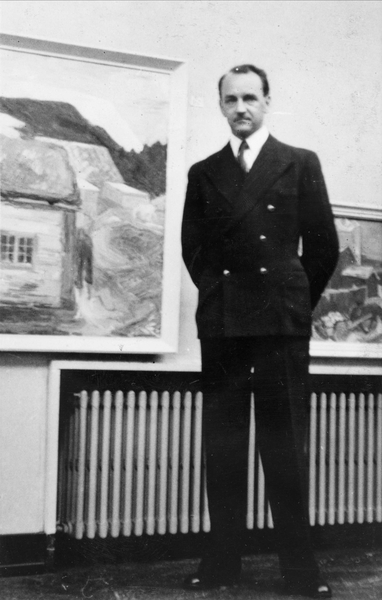
Rolf Juell Gleditsch, c. 1935

Rolf Juell Gleditsch (30 November 1892 – 13 January 1984) was a Norwegian painter.

He was born in Vardal Municipality. He was a second cousin of Odd, Ellen, Kristian and Henry Gleditsch, and a first cousin once removed of Kristen Gran Gleditsch and Jens Gran Gleditsch.

He studied in Stockholm from 1910 to 1913 and in Paris under Othon Friesz from 1919 to 1920. His main style was landscape paintings. He is represented in the National Gallery of Norway.
