= Jonas Cornelius Falk =

Norwegian politician

Jonas Cornelius Falk (1844–1915) was a Norwegian politician for the Liberal Party.

He served as a deputy representative to the Parliament of Norway during the term 1898–1900, representing the constituency of Nordlands Amt. He worked as a telegraph manager. He lived in Hemnesberget, was married to Anna Margrethe Middelthon (1857–1924) and is otherwise known as the father of politician and ideologist Erling Falk.
