= Kristen Gran Gleditsch =

Norwegian military officer and topographer

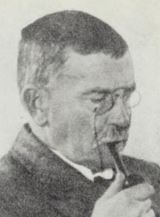
Kristen Gran Gleditsch

Kristen Gran Gleditsch (1867–1946) was a Norwegian military officer and topographer.

== Biography ==
Kristen Gran Gleditsch was born in Overhalla Municipality as a son of dean Lars August Gleditsch (1814–1886). He was a brother of bishop Jens Gran Gleditsch, an uncle of Ellen, Kristian and Henry Gleditsch, and a first cousin once removed of Odd Gleditsch, Sr. and Rolf Juell Gleditsch.

He started a military career, and reached the rank of lieutenant colonel in 1921. He had a parallel career in topography, as an employee in the Norwegian Mapping and Cadastre Authority (then known as Norges Geografiske Oppmåling) since 1898. He chaired the department of topography there from 1916 to 1932. He issued several maps and travelling books. He also chaired the Norwegian Society for the Conservation of Nature.
