= Bugårdsparken =

Park in Sandefjord, Norway

Coordinates: 59°08′00″N 10°11′33″E

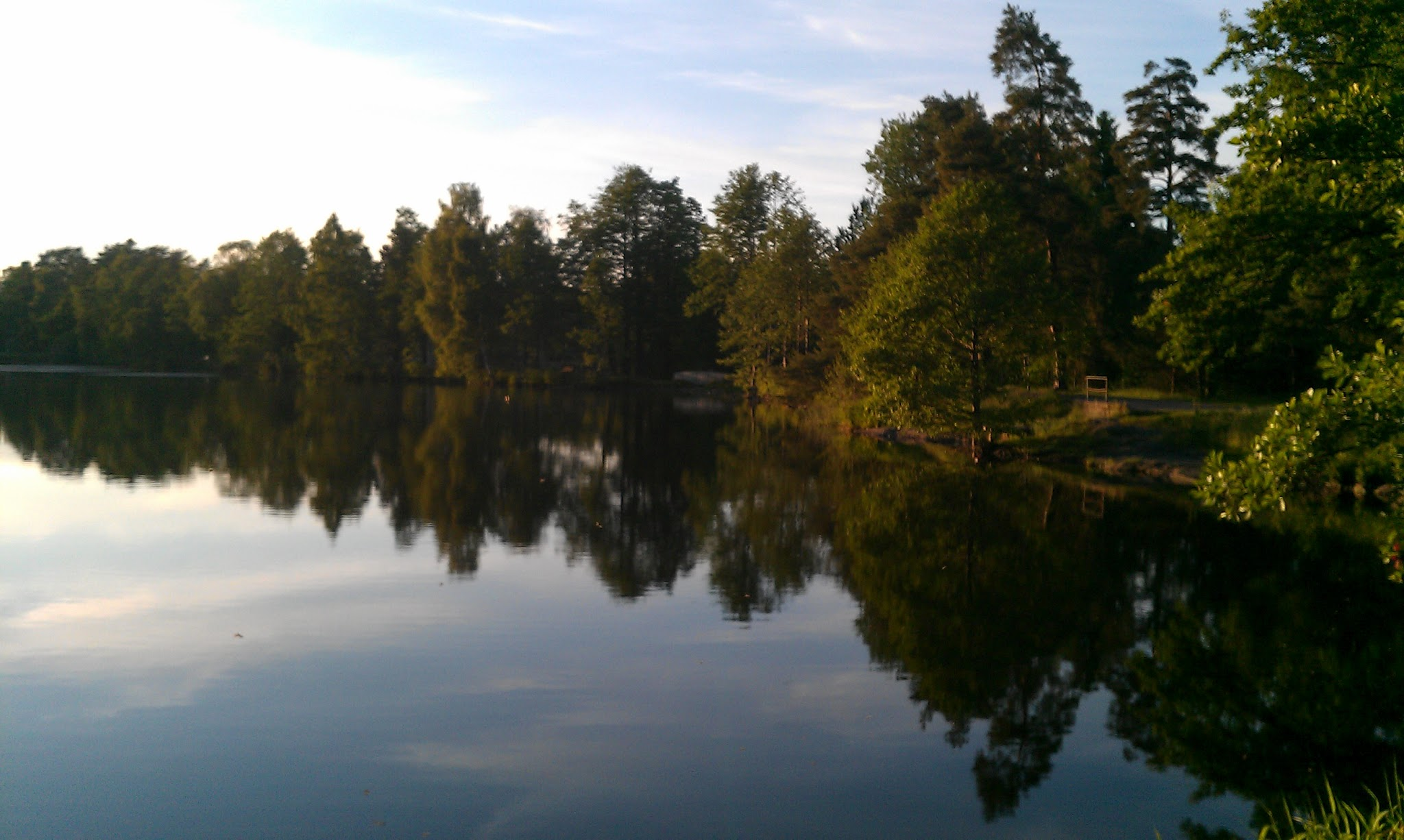
Bugårdsdammen.

Bugårdsparken (English: the Bugårds Park) is a 60-acre (24 ha) park and the main sports center in the city of Sandefjord in Sandefjord Municipality, Norway. It is also home to a 20-acre (8.1 ha) duck pond, Bugårdsdammen, as well as designated picnic areas and hiking trails. The park is organized for 18 different sports, including ice skating, ice hockey, soccer, swimming, archery, rollerskating, golf, badminton, and more. Besides an indoor 2,500 m.^{2} public pool, other buildings include Jotunhallen, which is used for handball, and Pingvinhallen, which houses tennis courts. Storstadion is also located here, current home of Sandefjord BK and former home of Sandefjord Fotball (1999-2007).

The sports park was established in 1946 and the idea of such a park came from former Sandefjord Ballklubb player Sigurd B. Gade. In 1961, the Norwegian Championship (NM) in ice skating was held in the park. It attracted 10,300 spectators.

In the mid-1940s, the sports park was, with the exception of Ekebergsletta in Oslo, the largest such sports facility in Norway. The sports facilities in the park were built from 1952 to 1959 when ice skating rinks, swimming pools, tennis courts, an ice-hockey field, and roads were constructed. Work on the park began in 1948, but its official opening ceremony took place on 22 June 1972, 25 years after the park's opening. The 1972 opening ceremony took place after the new stadium was completed with changing rooms and bleachers. The swimming pool was completed in 1982 and had over 100,000 annual visitors in its first years.

The park received Rolf Hofmo’s Award as Norway's best sports park in 1989.

== Bugårdsdammen ==
The lake, Bugårdsdammen (formerly Vannverket), was built in 1875 as a reservoir for the city's waterworks. Trees were planted around the reservoir and it became a popular site for excursions. Bands would regularly perform from boats in the lake.

The pond is home to wildlife such as swans and ducks, as well as fish species including European carp, Northern pike, European perch and Brown trout. Commonly observed bird species near Bugårdsdammen include the Northern shoveler, Eurasian teal, Common merganser, Red-breasted merganser, Little grebe, Eurasian wigeon, Common moorhen, Eurasian coot, Tufted duck, Common goldeneye, Mallard, Mute swan, Common gull, European herring gull, Lesser black-backed gull, and the Black-headed gull.

It is an artificial pond which was created in 1875–1876 with the purpose of housing the city's waterworks. The pond was later used for swimming and had a diving platform. The lake is however no longer suited for swimming.
