= Ellen Gleditsch =

Norwegian radiochemist (1879–1968)

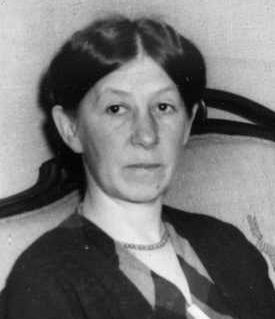
- Born: Ellen Gleditsch; 29 December 1879; Mandal, Norway
- Died: 5 June 1968 (aged 88)
- Education: University of Paris
- Known for: Half-life of radium
- Scientific career
- Fields: Radiochemist

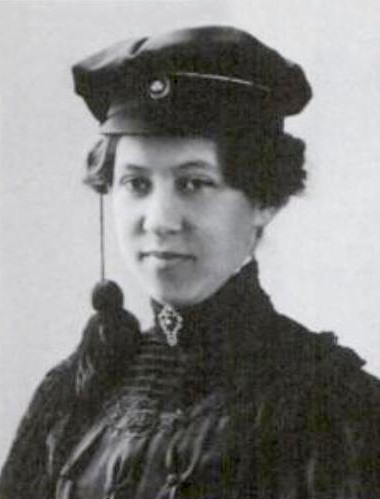
Ellen Gleditsch, graduation photograph

Ellen Gleditsch (29 December 1879 – 5 June 1968) was a Norwegian radiochemist and Norway's second female professor. Starting her career as an assistant to Marie Curie, she became a pioneer in radiochemistry, establishing the half-life of radium and helping demonstrate the existence of isotopes. She was vice president of the Norwegian Association for Women's Rights 1937–1939.

== Early life and education ==
Ellen Gleditsch was born in 1879 in Mandal, Norway. She was the daughter of Petra Birgitte Hansen (1857–1913) and headmaster Karl Kristian Gleditsch (1851–1913). Her siblings included architect Eivind Gleditsch (1885–1843), Adler (1893–1978) who lived with her for the rest of her life following the death of their parents, Liv Gleditsch (1895–1977) who graduated with a degree in chemistry, and civil engineer and geodesist Kristian Gleditsch. The family moved to Trondhjem and then Fredrikshald in 1905. She was the niece of Jens Gran Gleditsch and Kristen Gran Gleditsch, a first cousin of Henry Gleditsch and second cousin of Rolf Juell Gleditsch and Odd Gleditsch, Sr. Her sister in law through Kristian was Nini Haslund Gleditsch (1908–1996).

Although she graduated from high school at the top of her class, the college entrance exams were not available to women at the time. Therefore, she worked as a pharmacy assistant where she was able to work toward a non-academic degree in chemistry and pharmacology in 1902. In 1905 with the support of her mentor Eyvind Bødtker, she passed the university entrance exam, but chose to study in Paris.

== Career ==
After starting her career in pharmacy, she went on to study radioactivity at the Sorbonne and worked in Marie Curie's laboratory. When she arrived in 1907, she first worked with Curie at her first laboratory in Rue Courvier. She then moved to the newly opened Curie Institute and remained there until 1912.

At the institute, Gleditsch performed a technique known as fractional crystallization. By studying the separation and crystallization of barium salts, she was able to purify radium and later went on to measure its half-life. The work, which was highly specialized and few could complete, allowed her laboratory fees to be waived. She spent five years of analysis with Curie and returned even after leaving the lab to supervise experiments. In 1911, she graduated from the Sorboone as a "licenciée en sciences" and was awarded a teaching post at the University of Oslo where she worked with Margot Dorenfeldt. After she had been there for a year, Gleditsch won the first scholarship ever given to a woman from the American-Scandinavian Association to study in the United States, but was turned down by both of the schools at which she applied.

She went anyway and despite having been rejected was able to work at the laboratory of Bertram Boltwood at Yale University, where she measured the half-life of radium, creating a standard measurement that was used for many years. One of the scientists who had originally turned her away from Yale, co-authored two articles with her and in June 1914, Smith College awarded her an honorary doctorate for her work. In 1913–14, she returned to the University of Oslo and became the second woman to be elected to Oslo's Academy of Science in 1917. During the 1920s, Gleditsch made several trips to France to assist Curie, and subsequently kept up a correspondence with Russian French chemist Catherine Chamié who worked at the Radium Institute in the 1920s and 1930s. Gleditsch also made a trip to Cornwall to investigate a mine located there.

In 1919, Gleditsch co-founded the Norwegian Women Academics' Association, to focus on development of science and the conditions under which women scientists worked. She also believed that cooperation of scientists would foster peace. She served as president of the organisation from 1924 to 1928. Joining the International Federation of University Women in 1920, she served as its President from 1926 to 1929, working to provide scholarships to enable women to study abroad. In 1929, she made a trip to the United States travelling from New York to California with the intention of promoting scholarships for women.

Though her appointment as professor at Oslo in 1929 caused controversy, she successfully started a radioactivity research group there. Throughout the 1930s, she continued to produce articles in English, French, German and Norwegian. She also hosted a series of radio shows to promote and popularise scientific study. In the 1930s she directed, a laboratory doing radiochemistry in Norway, which was used as an underground laboratory by scientists fleeing from the Nazi regime. She was vice president of the Norwegian Association for Women's Rights 1937–1939. In 1939, she was appointed to the International committee on intellectual cooperation, where Marie Curie had also been sitting a few years earlier. When Norway was occupied during the war, she hid scientists and continued using her home for experiments. During a raid on her laboratory in 1943, the women scientists were able to rescue the radioactive minerals, but all of the men were arrested.

She retired from the university in 1946 and began working with UNESCO in their efforts to end illiteracy. In 1949, she was actively involved on the working committee and in 1952 was named to the Norwegian commission working to control use of the atomic bomb. That same year she resigned from UNESCO in protest over the admittance of Spain under Franco's fascist regime as a member. In 1962 at the age of 83, she received an honorary doctorate from the Sorbonne, the first woman to receive such an honour.

Ellen Gleditsch died on 5 June 1968, aged 89.

== Honours and awards ==
Order of St. Olav Knight 1st class ribbon bar

- In 1920, Ellen Gleditsch was awarded Fridtjof Nansen's reward for outstanding research.
- In 1948 she was awarded an honorary doctorate by the University of Strasbourg.
- In 1946 she was appointed a Knight of the 1st Class of the Order of St. Olav.
- In 1957 she became an honorary citizen of Paris.
- In 1962, she was named an honorary doctor at the University of the Sorbonne, as the first woman ever.
- In 1966, she was appointed an honorary member of the Norwegian Chemical Society.

== Commemoration ==
- Oslo Municipality has named a road after her; Ellen Gleditsch's road is located in the district Stovner in Oslo.
- In November 2018, OsloMet named a university building (P35) on the Pilstredet campus after her.
- In 2019, she got a street named after her in her hometown Mandal. Ellen Gleditsch road is located on Malmøy.
- In 2021, Radiumhospitalet's new cyclotron was named Ellen Gleditsch.

== Works ==
- (with Marie Curie) Curie; Gleditsch (1908). "Action de l'émanation du radium sur les solutions des sels de cuivre". Le Radium. 5 (8): 225. doi:10.1051/radium:0190800508022500.
- Sur le radium et l'uranium contenus dans les mineraux radioactifs, Comptes Rendus 148:1451 (1909)
- 'Ratio Between Uranium and Radium in the Radio-active Minerals', Comptes Rendus 149:267 (1909).
- Sur le rapport entre l'uranium et le radium dans les mineraux actifs, Radium 8:256 (1911).
- "The Life of Radium". American Journal of Science. 41: 112. 1916.

== See also ==
- List of women associated with Marie Curie and Irène Joliot-Curie
