= Nordicom =

Non-profit knowledge center

The Nordic Information Centre for Media and Communication Research (Nordicom) is a non-profit knowledge center based at the University of Gothenburg that works to collect and communicate media and communication research and facts conducted in the Nordic countries. The purpose of Nordicom's work is to develop the knowledge of media's role in society. This is done through:

- Following and documenting media development in terms of media structure, media ownership, media economy and media use.
- Conducting the annual survey The Media Barometer, which measures the reach of various media outlets in Sweden.
- Publishing research literature, including the International research journal Nordicom Review and the periodic journal Nordicom Information (1979-2018).
- Publishing newsletters on media trends in the Nordic region and policy issues in Europe.
- Continuously compiling information on how media research in the Nordic countries is developing.
- The international research conference NordMedia, which is arranged in cooperation with the national media and communication associations in the Nordic countries.

Nordicom is financed by the Nordic Council of Ministers, the Swedish Ministry of Culture and the University of Gothenburg.
