= Pax Leksikon =

Norwegian political encyclopedia

First edition

Pax Leksikon is a Norwegian political encyclopedia published in six volumes by the Norwegian publishing house Pax Forlag from 1978 to 1981.

Editors were Hans Fredrik Dahl, Jon Elster, Irene Iversen, Siri Nørve, Tor Inge Romøren, Rune Slagstad and Mariken Vaa. More than 400 experts contributed to the encyclopedia.

The encyclopedia has been made available online.

== List of volumes ==
This is a list of the six volumes of the encyclopedia Pax Leksikon (ISBN 82-530-0983-6 for all volumes 1–6).

- Volume 1: A-B. Published 1978 (ISBN 82-530-0975-5)
- Volume 2: C-G. Published 1979 (ISBN 82-530-0976-3)
- Volume 3: H-Ks. Published 1979 (ISBN 82-530-0977-1)
- Volume 4: Ku-N. Published 1980 (ISBN 82-530-0979-8)
- Volume 5: O-Sn. Published 1980 (ISBN 82-530-0980-1)
- Volume 6: So-Å. Published 1981 (ISBN 82-530-0982-8)
