= Arbeidernes Leksikon =

Norwegian encyclopedia

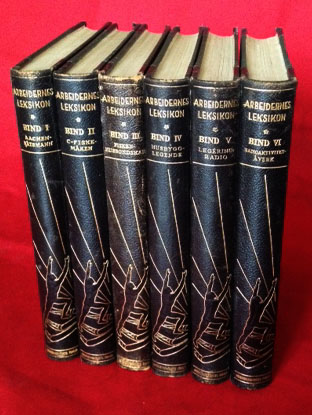
Arbeidernes Leksikon in six volumes.

Arbeidernes Leksikon (The Laborers' Encyclopedia) is a Norwegian encyclopedia published in six volumes in the 1930s.

It was the first reference book in Norwegian to have a pronounced class bias, and the first encyclopedia outside of the Soviet Union to be directed specifically at the working class. The publication had a connection with the Norwegian labor movement's goal to spread knowledge among the working and lower class, and in doing so could break the monopoly the middle class had on the dissemination of information in society. They thought that the existing encyclopedias had a middle class bias.

The idea of such an encyclopedia came within the group that produced the laborers' magazine Arbeidermagasinet. This magazine was produced from 1927 by members of the Communist Party of Norway (founded 1923). Communist Party member Jakob Friis was hired as chief editor of the encyclopedia in 1930. The work was published by the Arbeidermagasinet's publishing company in six volumes from 1932 to 1936. In addition to Jakob Friis, Trond Hegna worked as editor; from the third volume on, Dagfin Juel worked as a co-editor.

The Communist Party was reluctant to the whole project, and the Norwegian Labour Party was negative as well. In April 1933, Arbeidernes Leksikon received a grant from the group Mot Dag, which had formerly been affiliated with the Communist and Labour parties, but now was independent. Mot Dag leader Erling Falk was involved with the editorial work.

A selection of articles from the encyclopedia was published in 1974 in a three-volume reprint by the publishing house Pax Forlag. This publishing house also published its own class encyclopedia, Pax Leksikon.

Portions of the encyclopedia are available online.

== List of volumes ==
This is a list of the six volumes of the encyclopedia Arbeidernes Leksikon.

- Volume 1: Aachen-Båtsmann. Published 1932
- Volume 2: C-Fiskemåken. Published 1933
- Volume 3: Fisken-Husbondskar. Published 1933
- Volume 4: Husbygg-Legende. Published 1934
- Volume 5: Legering-Radio. Published 1935
- Volume 6 : Radioaktivitet-Åverk. Published 1936
