= Research & Politics =

Academic journal

- Discipline: Political science
- Language: English

Publication details
- History: 2014–present
- Publisher: SAGE Publishing
- Frequency: Continuous
- Open access: Yes
- License: CC BY-NC
- Impact factor: 4.357 (2021)

Standard abbreviations
- ISO 4: Res. Politics

Indexing
- ISSN: 2053-1680 (print); 2053-1680 (web)
- LCCN: 2015252273
- OCLC no.: 887931852

Links
- Journal homepage; Online access; Online archive

Research & Politics is a peer-reviewed open-access academic journal that covers research in political science. It was established in 2014 and is published by SAGE Publications on behalf of the Foundation Research & Politics.

== Abstracting and indexing ==
The journal is abstracted and indexed in Current Contents/Social and Behavioral Sciences, Scopus, and the Social Sciences Citation Index. According to the Journal Citation Reports, the journal has a 2021 impact factor of 4.357, ranking it 23rd out of 188 journals in the category "Political Science".
