= Fram Forlag =

Norwegian publishing company

Fram Forlag was a Norwegian publishing company. It was established as a publishing house for the organization Mot Dag in 1929, with Erling Falk as the founder and Torolf Elster as an early associate. The company was taken over by Tiden Norsk Forlag in 1936.
