= Henrik Groth =

Norwegian publisher and writer (1903–1983)

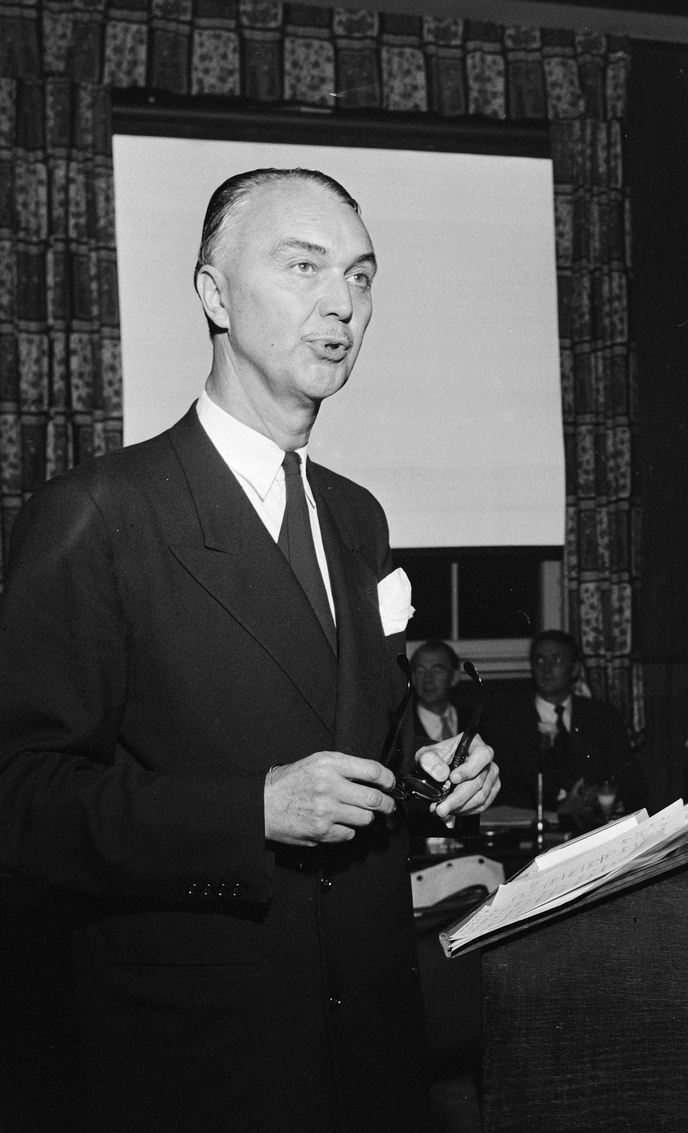
Henrik Groth in September 1958

Henrik Johan Florentz Groth (11 October 1903 – 10 August 1983) was a Norwegian publisher and essayist, who was managing director of the Cappelen publishing company from 1947 to 1973.

== Biography ==
Groth was born and grew up in Kristiania (now Oslo), Norway. He was the son of Halfdan Emil Groth (1874–1929) and Valborg Haagaas (1879–1960). His father held senior positions in the Den Norske Creditbank and was later managing director of Skogeierbanken A/S. His first cousins included Henriette Bie Lorentzen, co-founder of Nansen Academy.

He first became editor in the publication Vor verden which Ronald Fangen edited and Rivertons magasin edited by Sven Elvestad. He was hired in the publishing house J.W. Cappelens Forlag in 1927 where he was first assigned to advertising.

During the German occupation of Norway he eventually joined the Norwegian resistance movement. As a member of Hjemmefrontens kulturutvalg, he took part in shaping the Norwegian culture policy to come after the war's end. He was arrested in January 1944, and was incarcerated at Grini concentration camp from March 1944 to March 1945.

After the war's end, in 1945, Groth returned to his former post in Cappelen. He became director in 1947. He made a lasting mark ini 1948, founding the book series Cappelens upopulære skrifter. He retired in 1973. Groth was the chairman of the Norwegian Booksellers Association from 1950 to 1956, of the Norwegian Publishers Association from 1950 to 1956 and of the Foreningen Norden from 1959 to 1968. He was also a noted essayist of his own, and received the Fritt Ord Award in 1977.

Cultural offices
Preceded by Nils Langhelle	Chairman of Foreningen Norden in Norway; 1959-1964	Succeeded by Harald Throne-Holst
Awards
Preceded by Johan Vogt	Recipient of the Fritt Ord Award; 1977	Succeeded by Kim Friele
