= Mot Dag =

Norwegian political group

Mot Dag (Norwegian: [ˈmuːt ˈdɑːɡ], 'Towards Day') was a Norwegian political group. The group was active from the 1920s to the early 1930s and was first affiliated with the Labour Party until 1925. After World War II, many of its former members were leaders in Norwegian politics and cultural activities.

== History and profile ==
It was established in 1921 under the initiative of Erling Falk (1887–1940), partly with origins in the debate forum in the Social Democratic Student Association (Den Socialdemokratiske Studenterforening) at the University of Oslo; partly from a Falk-led study circle which, from 1919, involved Viggo Hansteen, Axel Sømme, and Arnold Hazeland. Members were strongly linked to Falk's personality and were subject to strict discipline. Falk aimed to develop a body of students and young workers committed to revolutionary socialism: according to George Lakey, the group "sought to replace middle-class individualism with a collective and disciplined spirit". The magazine Mot Dag was published by the group between 1921 and 1936. The first editor was future author and publishing consultant Sigurd Hoel (1890–1960).

Mot Dag was a collective member of the Norwegian Labour Party from March 1922 until August 1924, initially aligning itself with the revolutionary faction led by Martin Tranmæl, but was excluded from the party after a series of disagreements. In 1927, Mot Dag was a part of the Norwegian Communist Party (NKP). From 1929, Mot Dag was an independent political organization. In the middle of the 1930s, Mot Dag made an unsuccessful attempt to establish a new labour party. After the charismatic leader Erling Falk fell sick, Trond Hegna (1898–1992), took over the actual leadership. Hegna would later serve a member of the Norwegian Parliament (Storting) and leader of the Storting's finance committee.

In 1930, the publishing house Fram Forlag was established in part to publish the workers' encyclopaedia (Arbeidernes Leksikon, 1933). Both the magazine and organization dissolved in 1936. The organization had at most approximately 200 members and when it was dissolved in 1936 had about 100. Most of the members followed the internal orders to register in the Labour Party.

After World War II, many former members Mot Dag were leaders in Norwegian politics and culture. Norway's first three post-war Prime Ministers Einar Gerhardsen, Oscar Torp, and John Lyng were all at one point in time part of Mot Dag. In addition were Gro Harlem Brundtland's father, Secretary of Defence Gudmund Harlem; the Labour Party's longstanding secretary Haakon Lie, Oslo's longstanding mayor Brynjulf Bull, and future West German chancellor Willy Brandt.

Many well-known authors, intellectuals, and future leading politicians and officials were also members. Of note were filmmaker Olav Dalgard; the authors Helge Krog, Odd Eidem, Sigurd Hoel, Arnulf Øverland, Nic Waal and Inger Hagerup—the latter two of the few women who were connected to Mot Dag; future director of Norway's military intelligence Vilhelm Evang and future director of the Norwegian Directorate for Health, Karl Evang. Economist and future university professor Johan Vogt, who together with Falk, was behind the first translation of Das Kapital into Norwegian.
