= Pax Forlag =

Norwegian publishing house

Pax Forlag AS
- Type: Public
- Industry: Publishing
- Founded: 1964
- Headquarters: Oslo, Norway
- Area served: Norway
- Key people: Bjørn Smith-Simonsen (publisher); Astrid de Vibe (CEO)
- Number of employees: 26 (2026)
- Website: www.pax.no

Pax Forlag is a Norwegian publishing house, established in 1964.

The first manager was Tor Bjerkmann, who chaired the company from 1964 to 1972.

Starting with Bjerkmann's new translation of George Orwell's Animal Farm, Pax published 150 quality paperback editions during its first three years of operation.

Pax Forlag has issued a selected reprint of the "working class" encyclopaedia Arbeidernes Leksikon in 1974, and the political encyclopaedia Pax Leksikon (1978–1981).
