= Bestemødre mot atomvåpen =

Norwegian anti-nuclear organisation)

Bestemødre mot atomvåpen ("Grandmothers Against Nuclear Arms") was a Norwegian anti-nuclear organisation, founded in Oslo in 1983.
