= Jotun (company) =

Norwegian chemicals company

Jotun Group
- Type: Private
- Industry: Paints and Coatings
- Founded: 1926; 100 years ago
- Founder: Odd Gleditsch Sr.
- Headquarters: Sandefjord, Norway
- Area served: Global
- Key people: Morten Fon (President and CEO), Odd Gleditsch dy (Chairman of the board)
- Products: Paints Anti-fouling paints Protective coatings Powder coatings
- Revenue: 34 333 NOK million (2025)
- Owner: Gleditch family, Orkla Group (42.53%)
- Number of employees: 10,933 (2025)
- Website: https://www.jotun.com/

Jotun is a Norwegian multinational paint and coatings company dealing mainly in decorative paints and performance coatings (marine, protective and powder coatings). It is one of the world's largest manufacturers of paints and coating products. Jotun manufactures paints and varnishes for marine and industrial purposes, synthetic resins, floor coverings, polyurethane foam, heavy-duty coatings, binders, unsaturated polyesters, glass-fiber reinforced polyester pipes, tanks, and more.

Jotun merged with three other paint producers in 1971 and became not only Norway's largest paint producer but also one of the largest companies in Norway. As of January 2025, the company has a presence in more than 100 countries around the world, with almost 11,000 employees, 68 companies in 45 countries, and 40 production facilities.

As of 2025, Jotun had about 10,933 employees. It operated 40 factories and is represented in 120 countries through distributors, offices, and agents.

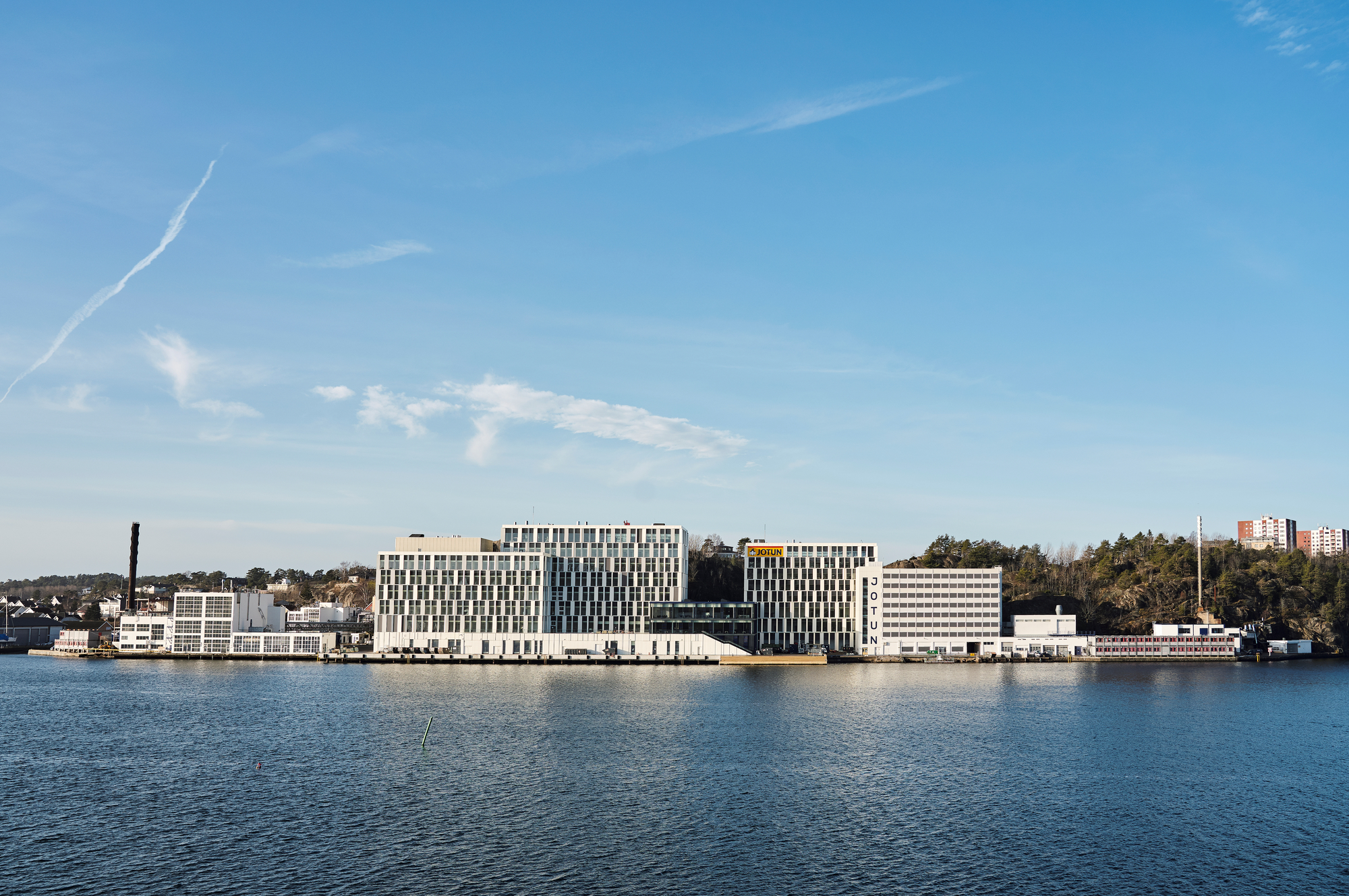
Jotun headquarters and R&D centre in Sandefjord, Norway

== History ==
Jotun began in the early 1920s as a paint and marine provisions merchant in Sandefjord, Norway. Sandefjord was a popular homeport for whaling ships, which used to get laid up in port every summer for repairs and maintenance. The company's founder, Odd Gleditsch Sr. had worked on whaling ships and felt there was a demand for such a provider in the whaling town. During those days, paint stores usually sold pigments, turpentine and linseed oil separately, leaving it to purchasers to buy and mix them. Gleditsch retired from the sea and opened a shop in Sandefjord to sell paints and provisions, but soon felt that a demand existed for ready-made paints. In 1926, he purchased an existing small chemical factory called Jotun. In the early 1930s, the company made its first popular ready-made paint called Arcanol, which was marketed to ship owners and shipyards, a strategy that Jotun continued to invest in. The 1920s and 1930s saw a boom in Norwegian shipping, especially in its dry cargo and tanker fleet, and Jotun took advantage of that.

To ensure an adequate stock existed in all principal ports for these Norwegian shipowners, Jotun began stocking paints in North Africa, Europe and the Americas. As the Middle East and Southeast Asian countries developed in the 1950s, Jotun began to market its products to ship suppliers there. The founder's son, Odd Gleditsch Jr., oversaw the company's expansion in the Middle East. Working with the Norwegian export council, he travelled to Libya where Jotun built its first overseas factory in 1962. In 1967, Jotun opened its second international factory in Thailand. which became the base for its operations in Southeast Asia.

In 1982, Jotun opened a trading office in Hong Kong. As China began to open up, Jotun developed a joint venture in Shanghai with the Chinese shipping giant COSCO to provide paints to its shipyards and ships. During that time, Jotun established a separate company called Jotun Coatings which focused on the manufacture of paints. In the 1970s, the company began to develop solvent-free powder coatings.

In 2026 Jotun celebrated its 100-year anniversary.

== Organization ==
The Jotun Group has four business segments, decorative paints, marine coatings, protective coatings and powder coatings, and has its head office in Sandefjord, Norway.

== Subsidiaries ==
Jotun became Norway's largest paint manufacturer in the 1960s and was headquartered in one of Norway's most modern industrial complexes in Sandefjord, Norway. In the 1960s, Jotun also began establishing factories abroad, including a factory in Tripoli, Libya. In 1968, Jotun established its first factory in Thailand near the capital of Bangkok. In 1969, Jotun's Spanish subsidiary Gardex S.A. opened its paint factory in Valencia, Spain.

Subsidiary companies include Jotun Powder Coatings Pty Ltd. and Jotun Protective Coatings Pty Ltd. in Australia, Jotun Thailand Ltd. in Thailand, Jotun NOF in Singapore, Sdn Bhd in Malaysia, Jotun Boya Tic AS in Turkey, Jotun Hellas Ltd. in Greece, Jotun Brignola SpA in Italy, Jotun SAE in Spain, Jotun Polymer France SA in France, Jotun Deutschland GmbH in Germany, Jotun Polymer BV in the Netherlands, OY Jotun Scanpol AB in Finland, Jotun Danmark A/S in Denmark, Jotun Polymer Inc. in the U.A.E., JOTUN CZECH a.s.in the Czech Republic, Vera Klippan AB in Sweden, and Jotun-Henry Clark Ltd., Jotun Decorative Coatings Ltd., Jotun Polymber Ltd., and Corro Clark Coatings Ltd. in the United Kingdom.

== Use on famous landmarks ==
Jotun has been and is used on several landmarks.

These include:

- TS Queen Mary
- Taizhou Yangtze River Bridge in Taizhou, Jiangsu, China
- The Petronas Towers in Kuala Lumpur, Malaysia
- Burj Khalifa in Dubai, U.A.E.
- Burj Al Arab in Dubai, U.A.E.
- Kingdom Center in Riyadh, Saudi Arabia
- West Tower in Guangzhou, China
- Canton Tower in Guangzhou, China
- Esentai Tower in Almaty, Kazakhstan
- Southern Cross railway station in Melbourne, Australia
- Guangzhou TV Tower in Guangzhou, China
- MS Oasis of the Seas
- Haj Terminal in Jeddah, Saudi Arabia
- Marina Bay Sands in Marina Bay, Singapore
- Biomuseo in Panama City, Panama
- New Clark City Athletics Stadium in Capas, Philippines.

== Related reading ==
- The Paint Business
