= Aaslaug Aasland =

Norwegian politician (1890–1962)

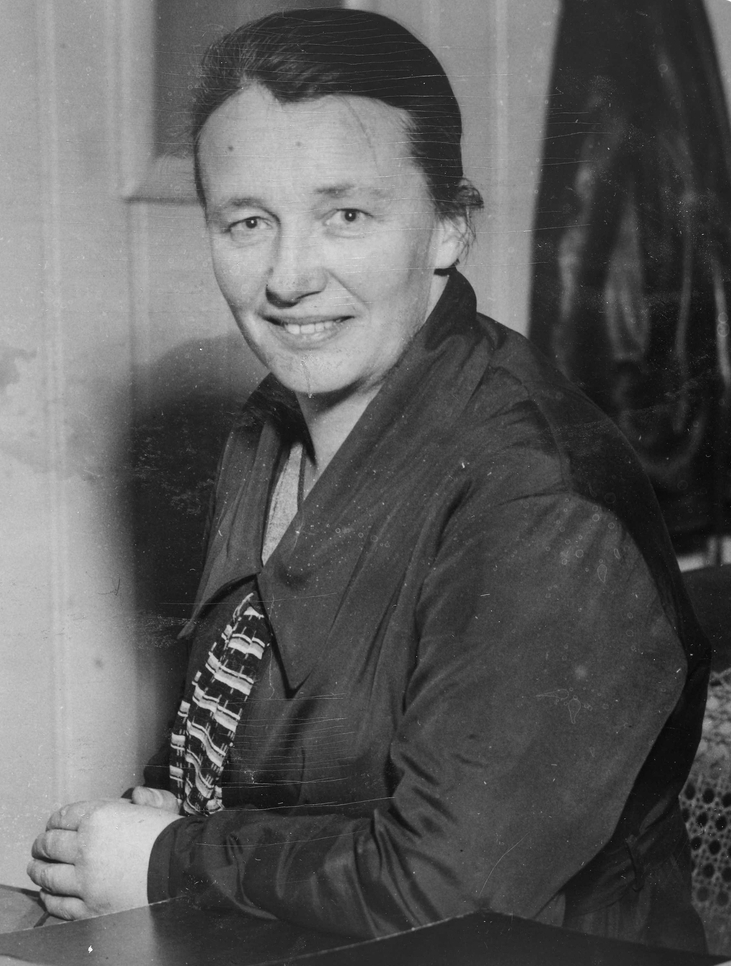
- Aaslaug Aasland, ca. 1935.

Minister of Social Affairs
- In office 20 December 1948 (Note: Aasland was acting minister from 18 May to 20 December 1948.) – 2 November 1953
- Prime Minister: Einar Gerhardsen; Oscar Torp
- Preceded by: Sven Oftedal
- Succeeded by: Rakel Seweriin

Consultative Minister of the Ministry of Social Affairs
- In office 5 November 1945 – 20 December 1948
- Prime Minister: Einar Gerhardsen
- Minister: Sven Oftedal; Herself
- Preceded by: Kirsten Hansteen
- Succeeded by: Vacant

Personal details
- Born: 11 August 1890 Sandnes, Rogaland, United Kingdoms of Sweden and Norway
- Died: 30 August 1962 (aged 72) Oslo, Norway
- Parent: Hans Aasland Hanna Marie Nielsen
- Education: Royal Frederick University

Aaslaug Aasland (11 August 1890 – 30 August 1962) was a Norwegian politician for the Labour Party. She served as Norwegian Minister of Social Affairs from 1948 to 1953.

She was born in Sandnes as a daughter of Hans Aasland (1855–1901) and Hanna Marie Nielsen (1857–1957). She took the examen artium in 1916, enrolled at the Royal Frederick University and graduated with the cand.jur. degree in 1922. She worked for the district stipendiary magistrate in Alta for a short time, and then worked for the Norwegian National Women's Council from 1924 to 1931, as a prison inspector from 1931 to 1936 and labour inspector from 1936 to 1945. In 1945 she briefly served as the director of Bredtveit women's prison, which had been a concentration camp during World War II's occupation of Norway by Nazi Germany.

Later in 1945, when Gerhardsen's Second Cabinet assumed office, Aasland became a consultative minister in the Ministry of Social Affairs. She held this post until 1948, when she succeeded Sven Oftedal as Minister of Social Affairs. She was the first female head of a government ministry (Kirsten Hansteen had preceded Aasland as a minister in 1945, but as consultative minister), and also the first female government minister belonging to the Labour Party. In addition, she served as a member of Oslo city council from 1945 to 1947.

Assessments of Aasland's accomplishments in the position have been mixed. According to historian and political scientist Trond Nordby she was a particularly weak government minister, as she was "not able to carry through anything" (this claim was built on interviews with Aasland's successors Rakel Seweriin and Gudmund Harlem).

She also served briefly as acting prime minister in 1953. With this she became the first woman to be acting prime minister in Norwegian history.

After stepping down as government minister, Aasland worked as an assistant secretary in the Ministry of Social Affairs. She was also a board member of the Norwegian People's Aid. She died in August 1962 in Oslo.

== Notes ==
Political offices
Preceded by Sven Oftedal	Norwegian Minister of Social Affairs; 1948–1953	Succeeded by Rakel Seweriin
