= Jens Gran Gleditsch =

Norwegian bishop and theologian (1860–1931)

Right Reverend Jens Gran Gleditsch
- Bishop
- Church: Church of Norway
- Diocese: Nidaros

Personal details
- Born: 6 December 1860 Voss, Norway
- Died: 27 October 1931 (aged 70) Oslo, Norway
- Denomination: Christian
- Parents: Lars August Gleditsch; Johanne Margrethe Gran
- Spouse: Georga Johnson (1890-1893); Marie Ihlen (1907-1931)
- Occupation: Priest
- Education: University of Oslo (Cand.theol., 1883)

Jens Gran Gleditsch (1860–1931) was a Norwegian bishop and theologian. He was a brother of Kristen Gran Gleditsch.

Gleditsch was born on 6 December 1860 in Voss Municipality, Søndre Bergenhus county, Norway. He received his cand.theol. degree in 1883 from the University of Oslo. He was a chaplain in Lista Municipality from 1887 until 1891. He then moved to Antwerp, Belgium to serve as pastor of the Norwegian Seaman's Church there. In 1912, Gleditsch became the parish priest in Arendal. From 1917 until 1923, he held various positions in churches in Oslo. In 1918, he received an honorary Doctorate of Theology from the University of Uppsala. He was bishop at the Diocese of Nidaros from 1923 until 1928. His appointment as a bishop was very controversial at the time due to his liberal theology. He retired after only five years as bishop due to health problems, and he died three years later in Oslo on 27 October 1931.

== Selected works ==
- Jesus og dogmet. Nogle ord om forholdet mellem den historiske og religiøse betragtning af Kristi person (1909)
- Andagtsbok: Kristelig tro og kristelig liv i korte betragtninger (1912)
- Norsk kirkepolitik. Tanker til overveielse (1913)
- Reformationens profil gjennem tiderne (1917)

Church of Norway titles
Preceded by Peter W. K. Bøckman, Sr.	Bishop of Nidaros; 1923–1928	Succeeded by Johan Nicolai Støren
