= Henry Gleditsch =

Norwegian actor and director

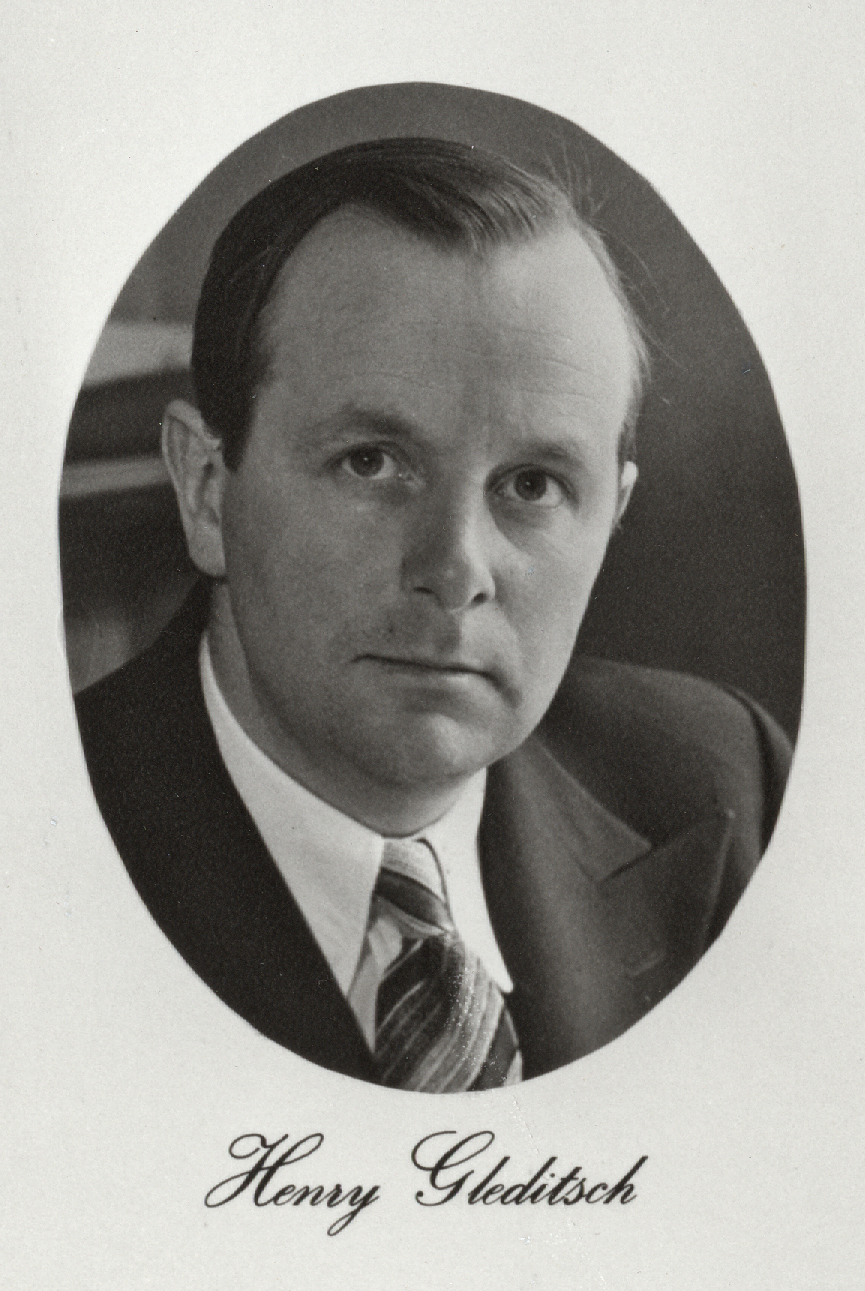
- Born: 9 November 1902
- Died: 7 October 1942 (aged 39)
- Spouse(s): Synnøve Gleditsch

Henry Cochrane Williamsen Gleditsch (9 November 1902 – 6 October 1942) was a Norwegian stage and film actor and theatre director.

== Early life and acting debut ==
He was born in Kristiania. In his young days he participated in skiing for SFK Lyn. He married Synnøve Tanvik in 1932.

He made his acting debut in 1923, and in 1937 he established and took charge of Trøndelag Teater in Trondheim. He had a satirical style, provoking the authorities of the Occupation of Norway by Nazi Germany. People warned him and advised him to flee to Sweden, but he did not do so.

== Execution ==
Following skirmishes in Majavatn and sabotages in Glomfjord and Malm, conducted by the Norwegian resistance movement, martial law was declared on 6 October 1942 in and around Trondheim, in Nord-Trøndelag county and in Grane Municipality. In a speech held in the main square in the city center of Trondheim, Josef Terboven declared an imminent crackdown on "those who pull the strings". Henry Gleditsch was executed as a propitiatory reprisal, near Falstad, together with newspaper editor and politician Harald Langhelle and eight other people.
