= Ording =

Ording is a West Germanic surname. Notable people with the surname include:

- Aake Anker Ording, Norwegian politician and consultant for Dynamit Nobel
- Arne Ording, Norwegian historian
- Bjart Ording, Norwegian horse rider
- Fredrik Ording, Norwegian educator
- Hans Ording, Norwegian theologian
- Johannes Ording, Norwegian theologian
- Jørn Ording, Norwegian actor
- Peter Ording, German rower
