= Liv Bernhoft Osa =

Norwegian actress (born 1957)

- Born: 3 March 1957 (age 69); Voss Municipality, Norway
- Occupation: Actress
- Spouse: Pål Løkkeberg
- Parent: Sigbjørn Bernhoft Osa
- Relatives: Rønnaug Alten (mother-in-law); Georg Løkkeberg (father-in-law)
- Awards: Hedda Award; Amanda Award

Liv Bernhoft Osa (born 3 March 1957) is a Norwegian actress.

She was born in Voss Municipality, a daughter of folk musician Sigbjørn Bernhoft Osa. She made her stage debut at Nationaltheatret in 1979, and has since mainly been assigned with this theatre, except for shorter periods at other theatres. She received the Hedda Award in 2011, for best female supporting role in the play Uskyld. She received the Amanda Award for best leading actress (the character "Alma") in the 2016 film Pyromaniac.

In her first marriage, she was married to stage and film director Pål Løkkeberg (1934–1998), and is thus a daughter-in-law of Rønnaug Alten and Georg Løkkeberg.
