= Alten (disambiguation) =

Alten may refer to:

- ALTEN, a French multinational company
- Alten Copper Works, Norwegian mining company
- Dessau-Alten, a district of Dessau-Roßlau, an independent city in Saxony-Anhalt, Germany

== People with the name ==
- Ferdinand von Alten (1885–1933), Russian-born German actor
- Bella Alten (1877–1962), operatic soprano
- Edvin Alten (1876–1967), Norwegian judge
- Ernie Alten (1894–1981), American baseball player
- Jürgen von Alten (1903–1994), German actor, screenwriter and film director
- Mathias Alten (1871–1938), German- American impressionist painter
- Rønnaug Alten (1910–2001), Norwegian actress
- Steve Alten (born 1959), American science-fiction author
- Wietse van Alten (born 1978), Dutch archer
