= Haakon Arnold =

Norwegian actor

- Born: March 18, 1897; Glemmen, Norway
- Died: April 16, 1968 (aged 71)
- Occupation: Actor

Haakon Arnold (born Haakon Ingemann Arnold Eriksen, March 18, 1897 – April 16, 1968) was a Norwegian actor.

Arnold was engaged with the Oslo New Theater from 1935 to 1949, and with the National Theater in Oslo from 1949 to 1962. In addition to theater, he worked as a film actor in supporting roles. He made his film debut in Alfred Maurstad's Hansen og Hansen in 1941, and he appeared in a total of 15 films until 1961.

== Filmography ==
- 1941: Hansen og Hansen as a detective
- 1942: Trysil-Knut as a raftsman
- 1942: Det æ'kke te å tru as the clerk at the employment office
- 1943: Den nye lægen as Antonsen
- 1943: Vigdis as the registrar
- 1948: Kampen om tungtvannet
- 1949: Døden er et kjærtegn as Olsen the constable
- 1951: Vi gifter oss as an agent
- 1951: Storfolk og småfolk as Lars Kampesveen
- 1951: Ukjent mann as the electrical controller
- 1953: Skøytekongen
- 1956: Kvinnens plass
- 1956: På solsiden as the man on the pier
- 1957: Stevnemøte med glemte år as an officer
- 1961: Hans Nielsen Hauge as the policeman
