= Hansen og Hansen =

1941 Norwegian film

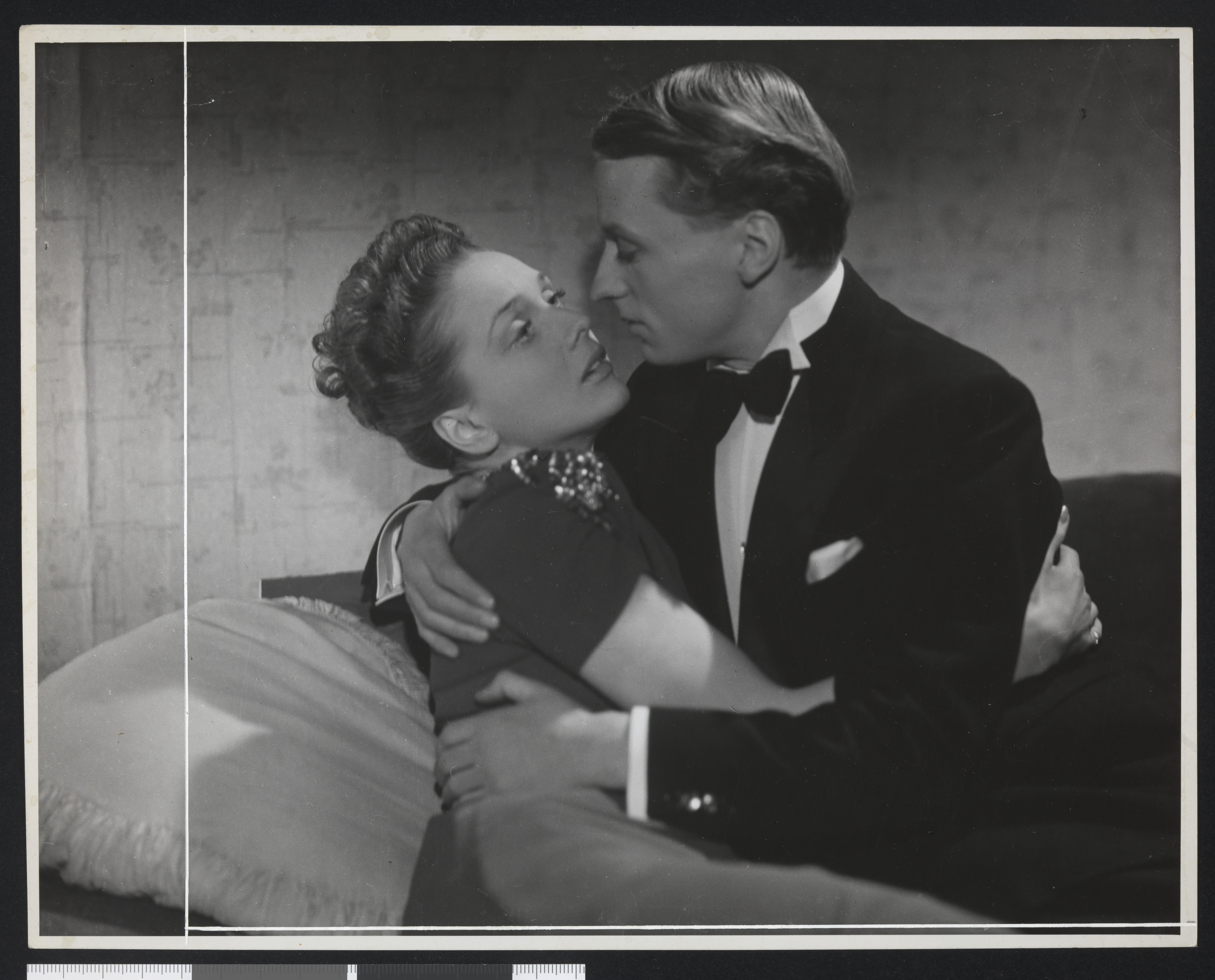
- Still from Hansen og Hansen (Nasjonalbiblioteket)
- Directed by: Alfred Maurstad
- Written by: Finn Bø; Alfred Maurstad
- Based on: Finn Bø's play Konge for en natt
- Produced by: Rasmus Breistein
- Starring: Liv Bredal; Carsten Winger; Joachim Holst-Jensen; Einar Sissener; Aud Egede-Nissen; Ellen Isefiær; Carl Struve; Øistein Børke; Jens Holstad; Axel Kielland; Kari Diesen; Alfred Maurstad; Einar Vaage; Bjørg Riiser-Larsen; Hilda Fredriksen; Harald Ottho; Ernst Diesen
- Cinematography: Kåre Bergstrøm; Ulf Greber
- Edited by: Titus Vibe-Müller
- Music by: Jolly Kramer-Johansen; Jens Larsen; Kristian Hauger
- Distributed by: Meteor Film
- Release date: November 3, 1941
- Running time: 87 minutes
- Country: Norway
- Language: Norwegian

Hansen og Hansen (Hansen and Hansen) is a Norwegian film from 1941. It was directed by Alfred Maurstad. The main roles were played by Liv Bredal and Carsten Winger. The film is based on Finn Bø's play Konge for en natt (King for One Night), which had been staged at the New Theater. A competition was held for the best theme song for the film. Three hundred manuscripts were submitted, and Jens Larsen from Stavanger won. Finn Bø then wrote the lyrics and title for the melody. The film was a great success at the cinema in 1941.

== Plot ==
Carsten Winger stars as a young unknown man named Hansen that ends up in a boarding house in the western part of Oslo on the same day that another man named Hansen (Axel Kielland), a real charmer, is expected. A lot of strange things happen at this boarding house, including a fire. The "fake" Hansen is arrested instead of the charmer and playboy, who is later revealed to be a swindler. However, the misunderstanding is cleared up, and the real Hansen is caught by the long arm of the law. Winger is released and becomes engaged to the model Miss Nord (Liv Bredal).

== Music ==
- "Jeg elsker deg" / "Te quero" (melody: Jens Larsen, lyrics: Finn Bø). Recorded by Aage Braarud with Willy Johansen's orchestra in Oslo in March 1941. Released on the 78 rpm disc His Master's Voice A.L 2747. In the film, the song was performed by Alfred Maurstad.
- "Te Quero," tango (melody: Jens Larsen, lyrics: Finn Bø). Recorded by Olav Werner with Øivind Bergh's Bristolorkester in March 1941. Released on the 78 rpm disc Columbia GN 812. Also recorded by the Odeon Ensemble, director Bjarne Amdahl, choral director Harald Larsen, in Oslo on 5 March 1941. Released on the 78 rpm disc Odeon ND-3840 AN 290344.
- "Christianiaswing," foxtrot (melody: Kristian Hauger). Recorded by Kristian Haugers Danseorkester in Oslo on 6 July 1941. Released on the 78 rpm discs Telefunken T-8400 and Telefunken T-8407.

== Cast ==
- Liv Bredal as Miss Nord
- Carsten Winger as Odd Hansen, a auditor
- Joachim Holst-Jensen as Tallaksen, a hydraulic engineer
- Einar Sissener as Agent Sørås
- Aud Egede-Nissen as Isabella Winge
- Ellen Isefiær as Svanhild
- Carl Struve as Blunke
- Øistein Børke as Dahl, a secretary
- Jens Holstad as Dingstad
- Axel Kielland Hansen as a company director
- Kari Diesen as Klara
- Alfred Maurstad as a street singer
- Einar Vaage as a board member
- Arvid Nilssen as Poppe
- Berit Alten as Miss Brun
- Erna Schøyen as Miss Lund
- Nanna Stenersen as Miss Ring
- Harald Steen as a chauffeur
- Erling Hanson as a chairman
- Haakon Arnold as a detective
- Hilda Fredriksen as an offended lady
- Bjørg Riiser-Larsen as a girlfriend
