= Carl Struve =

Norwegian actor and singer (1887–1974)

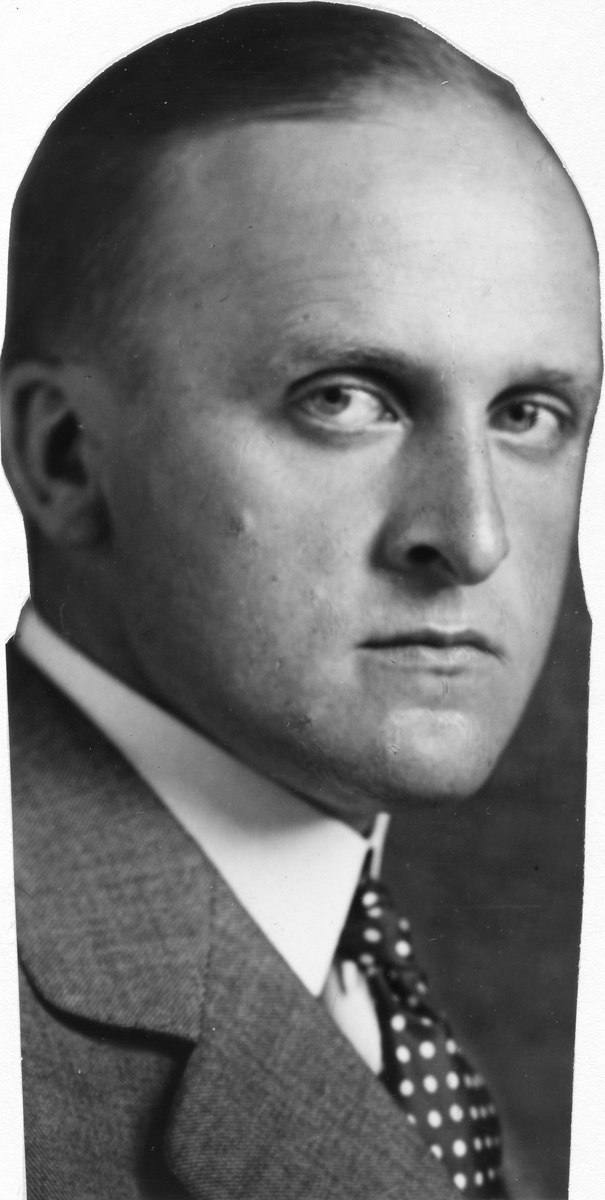
- Carl Struve circa 1935
- Born: April 12, 1887; Halden, Norway
- Died: November 26, 1974 (aged 87); Oslo, Norway
- Resting place: Cemetery of Our Saviour
- Occupation: Actor

Carl Struve (April 12, 1887 – November 26, 1974) was a Norwegian actor and singer. He studied singing with Wilhelm Kloed and made his debut at the National Theater in Oslo in 1908. Struve was engaged with the theater until 1919, when he also made his US debut. He also performed at a number of theaters in Stockholm, Finland, and the UK from 1921 to 1928. From 1935 to 1959, he worked as an actor at the Central Theater.

As a singer, Struve mastered a demanding repertoire, and he was praised for his role as Canio in Pagliacci.

== Lead roles in operas ==
- Carmen as Don José
- Mignon as Wilhelm Meister
- Madama Butterfly as B. F. Pinkerton
- The Tales of Hoffmann as Hoffmann

== Roles as a stage actor ==
- Pygmalion as Alfred Doolittle
- Rosmersholm as Ulrik Brendel

== Filmography ==
- 1936: Morderen uten ansikt as Berge, a country merchant
- 1940: Tørres Snørtevold as a lawyer
- 1941: Hansen og Hansen as Blunke
- 1943: Den nye lægen as Øyvind, Ulrich's younger brother
- 1944: En herre med bart as Byberg, a mason
- 1946: To liv as Gustafsen
- 1948: Det var en gang as the wanderer
- 1948: Trollfossen as Melsom, a board member
- 1950: Min kone er uskyldig as the guest at hotel in Norway
- 1951: Kranes konditori as Buck, a lawyer
- 1954: I moralens navn as Balthazar Krahn-Johnsen
- 1961: Den store barnedåpen (television theater) as the priest
