= Løkkeberg =

Løkkeberg is a Norwegian surname. Notable people with this surname include:

- Georg Løkkeberg (1909–1986), Norwegian actor
- Pål Løkkeberg (1934–1998), Norwegian film director and screenwriter
- Vibeke Løkkeberg (born 1945), Norwegian film actress and director
