= Brinchmann =

Brinchmann is a surname. Notable people with the surname include:

- Alex Brinchmann (1888–1978), Norwegian pediatrician, songwriter, novelist, playwright and crime fiction writer
- Arild Brinchmann (1922–1986), Norwegian stage producer, film producer and theatre director
- Christopher Brinchmann (1864–1940), Norwegian archivist, literary historian and critic
