= Rikard Nordraak (film) =

- Directed by: Alf Scott-Hansen Jr.
- Written by: Alf Scott-Hansen Jr.
- Produced by: Titus Vibe-Müller; Alf Scott-Hansen Jr.
- Starring: Georg Løkkeberg; Axel Thue; Jørn Ording; Wenche Foss
- Cinematography: Kåre Bergstrøm; Ragnar Didriksen
- Edited by: Titus Vibe-Müller; Alf Scott-Hansen Jr.
- Distributed by: Nordlys Film A/S
- Release date: December 26, 1945
- Running time: 91 minutes
- Country: Norway
- Language: Norwegian

Rikard Nordraak is a Norwegian drama film from 1945 directed by Alf Scott-Hansen Jr. The subject of the film is the Norwegian composer Rikard Nordraak, known among other things for having composed the Norwegian national anthem, "Ja, vi elsker dette landet".

== Cast ==
- Georg Løkkeberg as Rikard Nordraak
- Jørn Ording as Edvard Grieg
- Axel Thue as Bjørnstjerne Bjørnson
- Wenche Foss as Louise Lund
- Ingolf Rogde as Edmund Neupert
- Helen Brinchmann as Erika Lie
- Siri Rom as Marie Lund
- Henrik Børseth as Rikard Nordraak's father
