= I moralens navn =

- Directed by: Olav Engebretsen
- Written by: Sigurd Hoel, Rune Lindström
- Based on: Finn Bø's play I moralens navn
- Produced by: Vilhelm Bjørset
- Starring: Eva Lunde; Fridtjof Mjøen; Anita Thallaug
- Cinematography: Reidar Lund
- Edited by: Ragnar Engström
- Music by: Carl Chr. Bøyesen; Laurie Mackenzie
- Distributed by: Norenafilm
- Release date: November 1, 1954
- Running time: 87 minutes
- Country: Norway
- Language: Norwegian

I moralens navn (The Moral Reputation) is a Norwegian comedy film from 1954 directed by Olav Engebretsen. It stars Eva Lunde, Fridtjof Mjøen, and Anita Thallaug.

The film is based on Finn Bø's play with the same name, which premiered at the National Theatre in Oslo on September 22, 1937 and was directed by Bø himself. It was later performed that same year at the Trøndelag Theater.

== Plot ==
Mona and Egil have grown up with a jumble of parents and stepparents. Now they have a total of three pairs of parents. Mona gets pregnant, and all her parents want her to get married. During the engagement party, the parents cheat on each other one by one, which leads to Mona escaping with her fiancé. They decide not to get married. The parents travel to Copenhagen to look for the escaped young people.

== Cast ==
- Eva Lunde as Sussie Krahn-Johnsen, Alf Mowitz's former wife
- Fridtjof Mjøen as Birger Krahn-Johnsen, a director, formerly married to Ella
- Anita Thallaug as Mona Mowitz (Krahn-Johnsen), Sussie's daughter from her first marriage
- Jan Voigt as Egil Krahn-Johnsen, the director's son from his first marriage
- Egil Åsman as Fredrik
- Tore Foss as Otto Heymann, Ellas mann
- Synnøve Gleditsch as Ella Heymann, Otto's wife, Egil's mother
- Tage Lüneborg as the conductor at Lorry
- Sigurd Magnussøn as old Krahn-Johnsen
- Lillemor Nerem as Annelise
- Lars Nordrum as Rolf Hagen
- Thorleif Reiss as Alf Mowitz, formerly married to Sussie, Mona's father, and Agathe's husband
- Carl Struve as Balthazar Krahn-Johnsen
- Axel Thue as Consul Helm
- Anne-Lise Wang as Agathe Mowitz, Alf's wife
