= Vi vil leve =

- Directed by: Olav Dalgard; Rolf Randall
- Written by: Olav Dalgard; Rolf Randall
- Starring: Harald Heide Steen; Berit Alten; Stig Egede-Nissen; Kari Frisell
- Cinematography: Reidar Lund
- Music by: Arne Dørumsgaard
- Distributed by: A/S Folkefilm
- Release date: 1946
- Running time: 111 minutes
- Country: Norway
- Language: Norwegian

Vi vil leve (We Want to Live) is a Norwegian film from 1946 directed by Olav Dalgard and Rolf Randall. The film deals with the German occupation of Norway. The film studies professor Gunnar Iversen characterizes it as "an uneven and choppy film that is marred by melodramatization that undermines authentic material."

Dalgard and Randal wrote the manuscript while confined at the Grini detention camp and had it smuggled out before being sent to the Sachsenhausen concentration camp.

== Plot ==
It is April 9, 1940 and an airplane takes flight to warn Norwegian merchant vessels that German naval forces are on their way toward Norwegian waters. The pilot signals to a Norwegian-flagged ship that responds by firing at the aircraft. The pilot is injured but manages to land on the water. He is picked up by a Norwegian boat on his way to Kristiansand. Before he dies, he informs Captain Knut Viker and First Mate Harald Bakken about the incident.

Sussie Holm is waiting for Captain Viker on the dock. However, he is concerned with more important things than spending time with her, and therefore introduces her to Harald. Knut immediately goes to Kristiansand's military to inform them about the incident with the flight. At the same time, the message comes that Norway is at war with Germany. The air raid alarm goes off when German airplanes circle the city. Knut decides to fight the Germans and takes Harald with him. Germany proves to be overwhelming and they both move to Harald's hometown of Utøy, where they embark on dangerous underground work. They meet Harald's former girlfriend Elsa, and she and Knut fall in love with each other. At the same time, the Nazi county governor suspects Knut and Harald and has them watched. Sussie meets the Gestapo member Vogel and does hesitate to tell him about Knut as revenge for leaving her.

One night Knut and Harald are planning to put a captain on board a Norwegian warship to take the captain to England. The county governor is alerted and goes out with the Germans to arrest the captain. However, the captain has already gotten on board and he instead begins hunting for Knut and Harald. They have been given important papers to take ashore. Knut jumps ashore while Harald is arrested and interrogated by Vogel. Later, Knut is also arrested and he is also questioned and tortured. He confesses, but protects Harald as best he can. Soon, all the residents of Utøy are arrested and sent to the Grini detention camp. Knut and Harald are told that they risk being sentenced to death and therefore decide to escape. Elsa and Ruth manage to dress in German uniforms to get Knut and Harald out of prison. They flee to Sweden.

== Cast ==
- Oscar Egede-Nissen as Harald Bakken
- Harald Heide Steen as Captain Knut Viker
- Berit Alten as Elsa
- Bjarne Bø as Bøttun, a sheriff
- Leif Enger as Falck, an art dealer
- Helge Essmar as the commandant at Grini
- Jack Fjeldstad as a German officer
- Kari Frisell as Ruth Sørensen
- Svein Grythe as a Norwegian officer
- Nils Hald as Harald's father
- Ragnhild Hald as Harald's mother
- Haugestad as the detention camp officer
- Ola Isene as the Swedish doctor
- Vilhelm Lund as the German prison director at no. 19
- Arne Magler as a Norwegian pilot
- Sigurd Magnussøn as the doctor at Grini
- Fridtjof Mjøen as Vogel, a Gestapo member
- Sigrun Otto as Mrs. Sørensen at Grini
- Rolf Randall as a German officer
- Aagot Støkken as Sussie Holm
- Stig Vanberg as an SS member from Grini
- Lulu Ziegler as a café customer
- Øyvind Øyen
