= Kranes konditori =

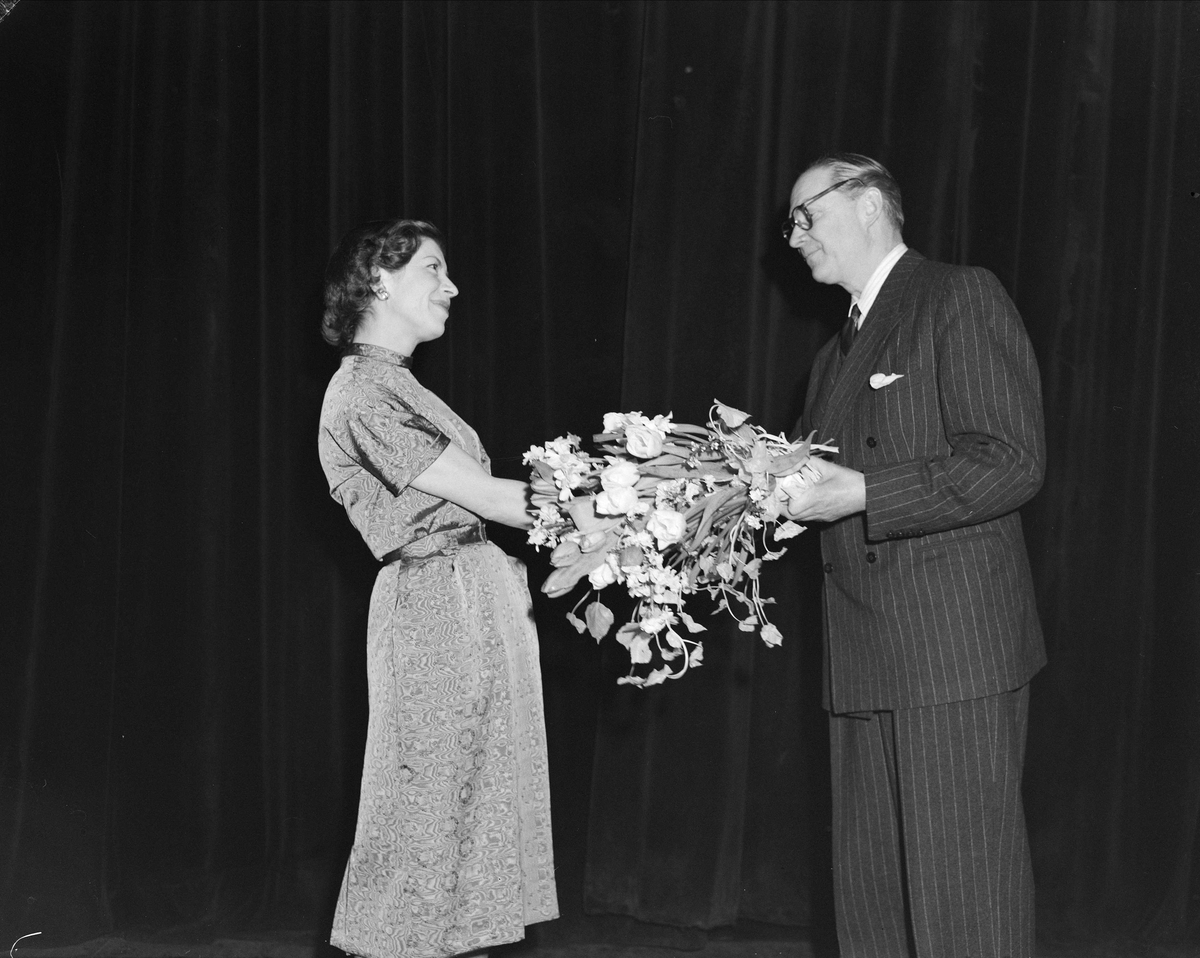
- Rønnaug Alten receives flowers during the premiere of the film Kranes konditori.
- Directed by: Astrid Henning-Jensen
- Written by: Astrid Henning-Jensen
- Based on: Cora Sandel's novel Kranes konditori
- Starring: Rønnaug Alten; Erik Hell; Wenche Foss; Harald Heide Steen; Kolbjørn Buøen; Lydia Opøien; Randi Kolstad; Toralv Maurstad; Jon Lennart Mjøen; Carl Struve; Ingeborg Steffens; Siri Rom; Aud Schønemann; Eva Steen; Sigrun Otto
- Cinematography: Per Jonson; Arthur J. Ornitz
- Edited by: Jan Erik Düring
- Music by: Pauline Hall
- Distributed by: Fotorama; Kommunenes Filmcentral
- Release date: February 15, 1951
- Running time: 113 minutes
- Country: Norway
- Language: Norwegian

Kranes konditori (English: "Krane's Café") is a 1951 Norwegian drama film from 1951 written and directed by Astrid Henning-Jensen, based on Cora Sandel's 1945-46 serialized novel.

== Plot ==
The film takes place in a small Norwegian coastal town and follows the life of Katinka Stordal (Rønnaug Alten). The film depicts her loneliness and longing for love. The only man she has ever loved has left her without saying goodbye. From her children she receives neither tenderness nor kindness—only hard, cold demands. Katinka fights to keep her family together. One day she meets the Swedish sailor Stivhatten (Erik Hell) at Krane's Café. Their meeting fuels gossip in the sleepy town, and Katinka's behavior arouses outrage among many: is she thinking of leaving her home and children?

== Cast ==
- Rønnaug Alten as Katinka Stordal
- Erik Hell as Stivhatten
- Wenche Foss as Elise Gjør
- Harald Heide Steen as Justus Gjør
- Kolbjørn Buøen as Peder Stordal
- Lydia Opøien as Mrs. Krane
- Randi Kolstad as Borghild Stordal
- Toralv Maurstad as Jørgen Stordal
- Jon Lennart Mjøen as Lydersen
- Carl Struve as Buck, a lawyer
- Ingeborg Steffens as Miss Sønstegård
- Siri Rom as Miss Larsen
- Aud Schønemann as Miss Thorsen
- Eva Steen as Mrs. Buck
- Sigrun Otto as Mrs. Breien
- Brita Bigum as Mrs. Berg
- Marit Halset as Mrs. Settem
- Turid Haaland as Mrs. Fosnes
- Harald Aimarsen
- Harald Heide-Steen Jr. as Justus

== Reception ==
The newspaper Verdens Gang praised the solid acting in the film, but complained about stiff camera work. The newspaper wrote, "The drama was intended to be presented firmly and tightly, with completely natural realism. Rønnaug Alten and Erik Hell maintain this style. But the situation and a number of secondary characters are drawn in strokes that are too thick. The film is solid, but it is also heavy. This simply makes it less entertaining. Astrid Henning-Jensen was not able to overcome this weakness, which has characterized so many Norwegian films."
