= Aagot Støkken =

Norwegian actress (1923–2008)

- Born: July 13, 1923; Christiania (now Oslo), Norway
- Died: February 4, 2008 (aged 84); Oslo, Norway
- Occupation: Actress

Aagot Kristine Støkken (July 13, 1923 – February 4, 2008) was a Norwegian actress.

Støkken was born in Christiania (now Oslo), Norway. She engaged with the Oslo New Theater from 1947 to 1958, and after that with the People's Theater, Trøndelag Theater, and Norwegian Opera and Ballet. Støkken made her debut as a screen actress in Vi vil leve, and she appeared in six films between 1946 and 1975. She is buried in Vestre Gravlund in Oslo.

== Filmography ==
- 1946: Vi vil leve as Sussie Holm
- 1957: Hjemme hos oss. Husmorfilmen 1957
- 1958: Ut av mørket
- 1971: Full utrykning as Mrs. Tellefsen
- 1973: To fluer i ett smekk as a woman
- 1975: Skraphandlerne as Aunt Tone
