= Ingeborg Steffens =

Norwegian actress (1907–1982)

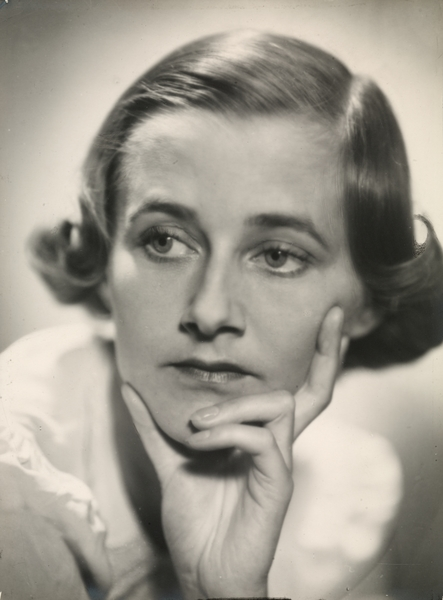
- Ingeborg Steffens circa 1935
- Born: October 3, 1907; Kristiania (now Oslo), Norway
- Died: April 27, 1982 (aged 74)
- Occupation: Actress
- Spouse: Georg Richter
- Father: William Steffens

Ingeborg Steffens (October 3, 1907 – April 27, 1982) was a Norwegian actress.

Steffens was born in Kristiania (now Oslo), Norway. She was the daughter of Major General William Steffens (1880–1964) and Anette Eger (1884–1944). She was the first wife of the actor Georg Richter.

Steffens was engaged at the Oslo New Theater from 1930 to 1947. Steffens made her film debut in 1951 in Astrid Henning-Jensen's film Kranes konditori and then starred in Ukjent mann (1951) and Andrine og Kjell (1952).

== Filmography ==
- 1951: Kranes konditori as Miss Sønstegård
- 1951: Ukjent mann as Miss Unstad
- 1952: Andrine og Kjell as Mrs. Borck
