= Helen Brinchmann =

Norwegian actress (1918–2016)

- Born: 18 August 1918; Oslo
- Died: 10 August 2016 (aged 97)

Helen Brinchmann (8 August 1918 – 10 August 2016) was a Norwegian actress.

She was born in Kristiania as a daughter of Alex Brinchmann (1888–1978) and Nina, née Grønvold (1891–1924). She was a sister of Arild Brinchmann. She married ship-owner Rolf Engelsen in 1950, later to be divorced.

She was employed at Trøndelag Teater from 1940 until it closed in 1942, then at Det Nye Teater from 1942, the Carl Johan Theatre from 1944, Det Nye Teater again from 1945, the National Theatre from 1946–1948, 1952–1955 and 1963–1982 except for the years 1949 to 1951 at Den Nationale Scene. For her role as Cecilie in Helge Krog's play Underveis, performer at the National Theatre in 1948, Brinchmann received the Norwegian Theatre Critics Award. She appeared in a few movies, including Rikard Nordraak (1945).
