= Trollfossen =

- Directed by: Alf Scott-Hansen Jr.
- Written by: Alf Scott-Hansen Jr. Finn Bø; Sigurd Hoel
- Produced by: Agnar Hølaas
- Starring: Ola Isene; Wenche Foss; Knut Wigert; Thorleif Reiss; Marit Halset; Henrik Børseth; Fridtjof Mjøen; Einar Vaage
- Cinematography: Finn Bergan; Per G. Jonson
- Edited by: Reidar Lund; Olav Engebretsen
- Music by: Edvard Grieg
- Distributed by: Nordlys Film
- Release date: 1948
- Running time: 86 minutes
- Country: Norway
- Language: Norwegian

Trollfossen is a Norwegian film from 1948. It was directed by Alf Scott-Hansen and featured Ola Isene and Wenche Foss in the lead roles.

The film tells the story of the skilled pianist Sylvia Strøm (Wenche Foss), who is forced by her husband, the unscrupulous hydropower developer Director Strøm (Ola Isene), to sacrifice music for electrification. She falls in love with the dam guard Engineer Borg (Knut Wigert), but then the workers begin to sabotage the construction work so that foreign interests can gain control of the waterfall. A recurring theme is Edvard Grieg's Piano Concerto in A minor, which is repeatedly linked to Per G. Jonson's film clips of Norwegian waterfalls (especially Vøring Falls) and mountains. During the filming of Skjeggedal Falls, the seaplane with the cinematographers was reported missing. It was co-piloted by Erling Drangsholt Jr., who was the son of the actor Erling Drangsholt (1883–1950).

According to Aftenpostens film reviewer, the result was "one of the weakest things one could expect. Not one piece of dialogue (written by Finn Bø and Sigurd Hoel) is worth the paper it was written on." Verdens Gang's reviewer was less dismissive and thought the cinematography by Per G. Jonson was well done, but the rhythm of the action was too slow and the storytelling too cumbersome.
