= Vigdis (film) =

- Directed by: Helge Lunde
- Written by: Helge Lunde
- Based on: Albert Wiesener's novel Vigdis og hennes barns fedre
- Starring: Eva Sletto; Lars Tvinde; Liv Uchermann Selmer
- Cinematography: Reidar Lund
- Edited by: Olav Engebretsen
- Music by: Jolly Kramer-Johansen
- Distributed by: Skandia Film
- Release date: August 2, 1943
- Running time: 94 minutes
- Country: Norway
- Language: Norwegian

Vigdis is a Norwegian film from 1943 directed by Helge Lunde. It is based on the novel Vigdis og hennes barns fedre (Vigdis and Her Child's Fathers), which was published by the lawyer Albert Wiesener in 1931 under the pseudonym Frantz Ferdinand.

== Plot ==
Vigdis is the daughter of the teacher and fervent church singer Jens Bjørkeli. Vigdis is often at parties with other young people from the area, something her strict parents do not like. Their concern is not entirely unjustified because the residents of the area have started talking about their daughter in the town. Her parents try to get her to go to Christian meetings, but she always manages to evade this.

The parents suspect their maid Kari of helping Vigdis. Vigdis is in love with Dr. Victor Falck. However, she does not tell anyone about this because Falck is engaged to Gerda Storm. In the evening there is dancing, and Vigdis kisses Falck. A few days later there is a mission meeting, and Vigdis is there with her parents. A forest worker, Anton, stands outside drunk. However, Vigdis manages to follow him home. Nine months later, Vigdis gives birth to a son. Despite attempts at persuasion, Vigdis does not want to say who the child's father really was.

== Cast ==
- Eva Sletto as Vigdis Bjørkli
- Lars Tvinde as Jens Bjørkli, a teacher and church singer
- Liv Uchermann Selmer as Minda Bjørkli, his wife
- Tulla Hauge as Kari, a servant girl at the Bjørkli home
- Harald Heide Steen as Anders Moen, a forest worker
- Fridtjof Mjøen as Victor Falck, a doctor
- Bjørg Riiser-Larsen as Gerda Storm, Falck's fiancée
- Henki Kolstad as Erik Borgan, an assistant clerk
- Eva Strøm Aastorp as Berit Bråten, a farmer's daughter
- Arvid Nilssen as Anton Stubberudstuen, a forest worker
- Guri Stormoen as Olga Stubberudstuen
- Joachim Holst-Jensen as P. P. Jeremiassen, a shoemaker
- Øyvind Øyen as Harald Nordby, a wealthy farmer
- Ragna Breda as Nordby's sister
- Turid Haaland as Nordby's sister
- Synnøve Øian as Nordby's girlfriend
- Thomas Thomassen as the judge
- Haakon Arnold
- Pehr Qværnstrøm as the witness
- Oscar Egede-Nissen as a farm boy
- Dagmar Myhrvold as the midwife
- Lisbeth Nyborg as a farmer's wife
- Vivi Schøyen as a barmaid
- Edith Carlmar as a woman (not credited)
