= Liv Bredal =

Norwegian actress (1919–2011)

- Born: February 14, 1919; Stavanger, Norway
- Died: November 25, 2011 (aged 92); Bærum, Norway
- Occupation: Actress
- Spouse: Ivo Caprino
- Children: Remo Caprino, Ivonne Caprino

Liv Helen Bredal (February 14, 1919 – November 25, 2011) was a Norwegian film actress from Stavanger.

== Family ==
Liv Bredal was born in Stavanger as the daughter of Olav M. Bredal (1896–1956) and Gunvor Kjeldsrud-Knudsen (1898–1940). She married the puppeteer Ivo Caprino in 1942, and she converted to Catholicism. She was the mother of the film directors Remo Caprino and Ivonne Caprino. She died in Bærum in 2011.

== Career ==
Bredal appeared in four films altogether. She made her debut in 1941 in Alfred Maurstad's Hansen og Hansen, in which she played the lead role of Miss Nord, followed by a role in Rasmus Breistein's Gullfjellet. In 1942, she played a supporting role in Alfred Maurstad's En herre med bart. In 1944, Leif Juster offered her a position at the Edderkoppen Theater, but she declined it due to the distance from her home. Her final film performance was in the 1949 short I gode hender.

== Filmography ==
- 1941: Hansen og Hansen as Miss Nord
- 1941: Gullfjellet as an office lady
- 1942: En herre med bart as Miss Helvik, a spa guest
- 1949: I gode hender (short)
