= Arne Ording =

Norwegian historian and politician

Arne Ording (7 May 1898 – 26 July 1967) was a Norwegian historian and politician for Mot Dag and the Labour Party.

== Pre-war life and career ==
Ording was born in Kristiania as a son of theology professor Johannes Ording (1869–1929) and Fredrikke Ording (1874–1966). He was a maternal great-grandson of Andreas Hauge, a nephew of educator and politician Fredrik Ording and theologian Hans Nielsen Hauge Ording, a first cousin of actor Jørn Ording and a second cousin of Aake Anker Ording.

He took his examen artium in 1916, and subsequently enrolled at the Royal Frederick University. In 1921 he joined the group around the periodical Mot Dag, and when Mot Dag was formalized as an organization, Ording became one of the prominent members. Mot Dag was a revolutionary socialist group, and had a goal of attracting an elite of intellectuals. Ording was also the chairman of the Mot Dag-affiliated organization Clarté, and edited its periodical of the same name for a period.

He graduated with the cand.philol. degree in 1924, and continued his studies. He had a stay in France from 1926 to 1927, and took the dr.philos. degree in 1930 with the thesis Le Bureau de police du Comité de Salut public. Étude sur la Terreur. In 1936 he issued the book Den første internasjonale. Arbeiderbevegelsens gjennombrudd 1830–1875, about the First International.

The same year, in 1936, Mot Dag was absorbed by the Norwegian Labour Party. Ording edited their periodical Det 20de Århundre together with Finn Moe, and also worked as a commentator in the Norwegian Broadcasting Corporation.

== World War II ==
During World War II, Ording was exiled together with Nygaardsvold's Cabinet. He escaped to the UK on the Royal Navy cruiser Devonshire, along with King Haakon, Crown Prince Olav and the Norwegian Government in June 1940. In London he worked as a consultant for Minister of Foreign Affairs Trygve Lie. He became known to the occupied Norwegian people for his news commentaries, broadcast from London through BBC Radio. His impact as an exiled commentator was only comparable to that of Toralf Øksnevad; historian Hans Fredrik Dahl notes that "judging by contemporary sources [the two held] an entirely unusual authority". A collection of these commentaries was published in 1946 as 100 kronikker. Also, in March 1942 he married Sigrid Vidnes (1900–1989), widow of Jacob Vidnes.

== Post war life and career ==
After the war Ording continued as foreign affairs advisor under Halvard Lange, although he declined Lange's offer to be appointed as State Secretary in both 1949 and 1953. He actively supported Norway's signing of the North Atlantic Treaty in 1949, a controversial issue. Not long after, Norway established its first development aid project, in Kerala, about which Ording wrote that as military and defence costs rose, the public had to be "given [...] something positive".

From 1947 to 1959 Ording held the position as professor of international history at the University of Oslo. He edited the journal Internasjonal Politikk during this period; he had formerly edited a journal of the same name from 1937 to 1940. He is best known for editing the eight-volume work Aschehougs verdenshistorie together with T. Dahl. He also wrote Arbeiderbevegelsen fram til 1887, volume one of Det norske Arbeiderpartis historie released in 1960. He kept diaries from 1942 to 1955, and although it was not his intention to publish these, the wartime writings from 1942 to 1945 were published in 2000. A second volume, covering the period 1945–1949, was published in 2003.

Ording himself died in July 1967 in Oslo. He struggled with Alzheimer's disease for many years.

== Selected works ==
- Oslo Bokbinderforenings historie 1832–1932 (1932)
- Norsk centralforening for boktrykkere gjennem 50 år (1932)
- Den første internasjonale. Arbeiderbevegelsens gjennombrudd 1830–1875 (1936)
- 100 kronikker (1946)
- Våre falne 1939-1945 (volume I-IV; 1949–1951; main editor)
- Aschehougs verdenshistorie. Fra antikken til våre dager (8 volumes; 1958; co-editor)
- Arne Ordings dagbøker 19. juni 1942–23. juli 1945 (2000; diaries edited by E. Opsahl)
- Arne Ordings dagbøker 24. juli 1945–4. april 1949 (2003; diaries edited by Gerd Mordt)
