= Berit Alten =

Norwegian actress (1915–2002)

- Born: May 2, 1915; Kristiania (now Oslo), Norway
- Died: December 18, 2002 (aged 87); Oslo, Norway
- Occupation: Actress
- Spouse: Asbjørn Aarnes
- Father: Edvin Alten
- Relatives: Rønnaug Alten

Berit Alten (May 2, 1915 – December 18, 2002) was a Norwegian actress.

== Family ==
Alten was born in Kristiania (now Oslo), the daughter of the judge Edvin Alten (1876–1967) and Ragna Aass (1880–1975). Her half-sister was the actress Rønnaug Alten (1910–2001). In 1950 she married the literary historian Asbjørn Aarnes (1923–2013).

== Career ==
Alten made her stage debut in 1938 at the New Theater, and from 1939 to 1947 she was engaged with the Trøndelag Theater. She made her film debut in 1939 in Helge Lunde's film Familien på Borgan. Alten appeared in four films altogether from 1939 to 1946. In her last film, Vi vil leve, she played one of the lead roles as Elsa.

== Filmography ==
- 1939: Familien på Borgan as a girl
- 1941: Hansen og Hansen as Miss Brun
- 1944: Hans livs lopp (short) as a Norwegian refugee
- 1946: Vi vil leve as Elsa
