= Harald Wergeland =

Norwegian physicist (1912–1987)

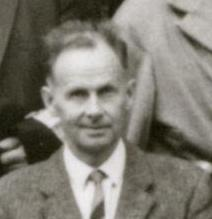
Wergeland 1963 in Copenhagen

Harald Nicolai Storm Wergeland (14 March 1912 – 25 January 1987) was a Norwegian physicist. He was a professor at the Norwegian Institute of Technology.

He was born in Norderhov as a son of forest manager Harald Nicolay Storm Wergeland (1884–1953) and Ebba Marie Weien (1889–1952). In 1937 he married Hedvig Louise Ording, a sister of Fredrik Ording.

He finished his secondary education in 1931. He graduated as a chemical engineer from the Norwegian Institute of Technology in 1936 and earned the dr.philos. degree in 1942. He was briefly a teacher at Trondheim Commerce School before working as an assistant at the Norwegian Institute of Technology from 1939.

Wergeland worked as a professor of physics from 1946 to 1979 at the Norwegian Institute of Technology, now the Norwegian University of Science and Technology at Gløshaugen. He also served as associate professor at Purdue University from 1948 to 1949. Wergeland participated in the foundation of CERN and was a leading member of Pugwash in Norway.

He served as praeses of the Royal Norwegian Society of Sciences and Letters from 1958 to 1965. He was a member of the Norwegian Academy of Science and Letters from 1943, the Royal Danish Academy of Sciences and Letters from 1964 and the Royal Swedish Academy of Sciences. He was decorated as a Knight, First Class of the Order of St. Olav in 1960 and received the Gunnerus Medal in 1970.

Academic offices
Preceded by Thorolf Vogt	Praeses of the Royal Norwegian Society of Sciences and Letters; 1958–1965	Succeeded by Tord Godal
