= Asbjørn Aarnes =

Norwegian professor and literary historian

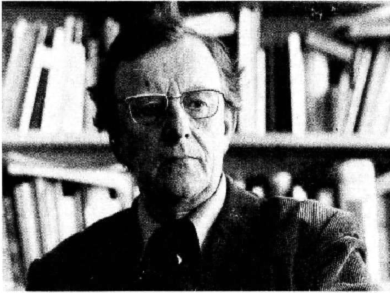
- Asbjørn Aarnes
- Born: 20 December 1923; Vågbø in Tingvoll Municipality
- Died: 8 January 2013 (aged 89); Oslo, Norway
- Education: University of Oslo École Normale Supérieure
- Occupations: Professor and literary historian
- Spouse: Berit Alten (1915–2002)

Asbjørn Aarnes (20 December 1923 – 8 January 2013) was a Norwegian professor and literary historian.

== Biography ==
He was born at Vågbø in Tingvoll Municipality, Norway. He studied from 1951-52 at École Normale Supérieure in Paris. In 1957, Aarnes became Dr. Philos. at the University of Oslo.

He was appointed professor at the University of Oslo from 1964. He was professor of European literary history from 1964 to 1993, as well as head of literature department from 1966 to 1970. He was co-editor of the book series Idé og tanke, jointly with Egil A. Wyller, and principal editor of the book series Thorleif Dahls Kulturbibliotek from 1978 to 2001. He has also written several works on French literature and on Norwegian poets. In 1963 he was admitted to the Norwegian Academy and presided over from 1967-82. From 2005, he wrote a column for Dag og Tid.

== Awards ==
Aarnes became a member of the Norwegian Academy of Sciences in 1983. He received several French honorary decorations, including l'Ordre national du Mérite in 1970, the Légion d'Honneur in 1979 and l'Ordre des Palmes Académiques in 1984. He was the first recipient of the Anders Jahre cultural prize (Anders Jahres kulturpris) which he received jointly with sculptor Nils Aas in 1990.

== Personal life ==
In 1950, he married the actress Berit Alten (1915–2002), the daughter of Edvin Alten (1876–1967) and Ragna Aass (1880–1975). She was the younger sister of actress Rønnaug Alten (1910– 2001).
