= Eva Lunde =

Norwegian actress (1922–1996)

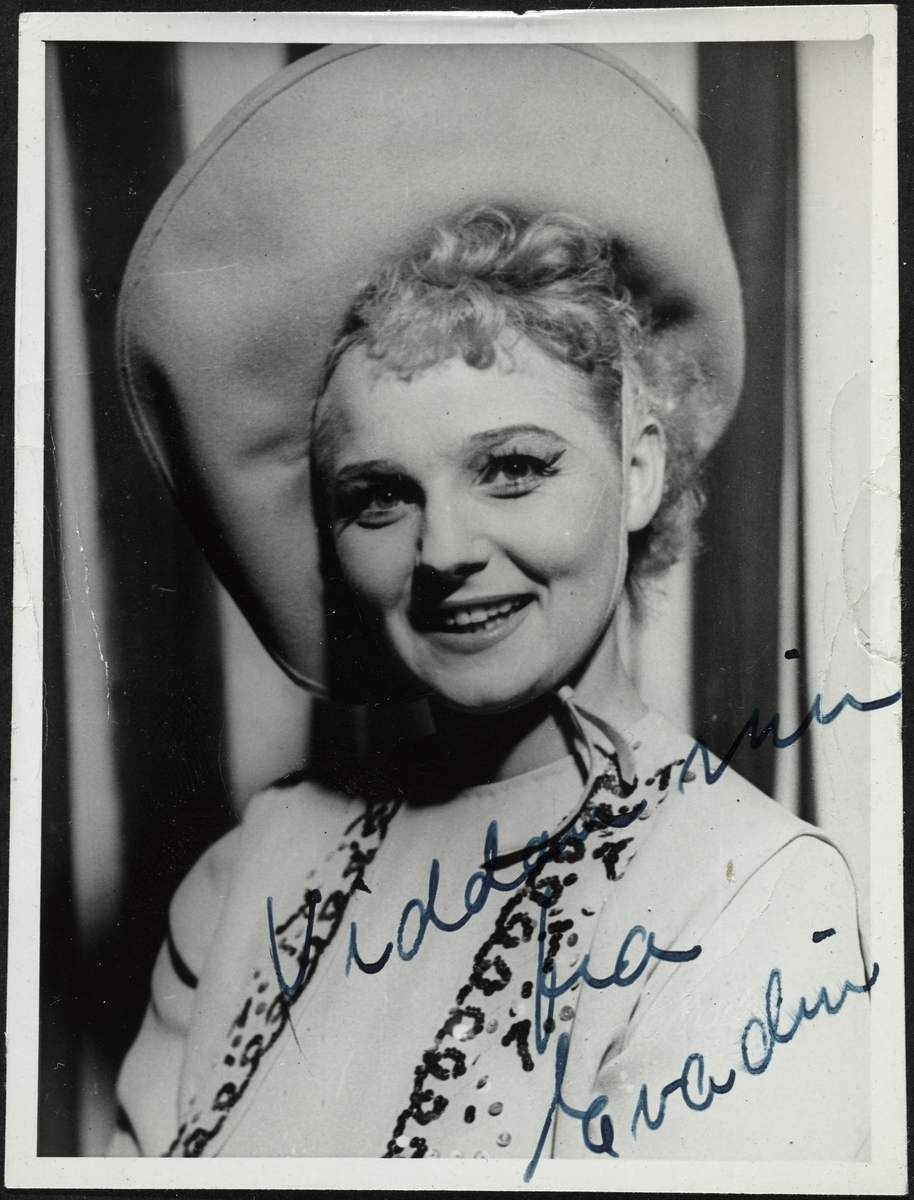
- Born: April 23, 1922; Jeløya, Norway
- Died: October 14, 1996 (aged 74)
- Occupation: Actress

Eva Lunde (April 23, 1922 – October 14, 1996) was a Norwegian actress. She played roles in several Norwegian films, including Tante Pose and Den forsvundne pølsemakere. From 1948 to 1952 she was engaged with the Trøndelag Theater, where she was a supporting and versatile force.

== Filmography ==
- 1939: De vergeløse as Gunda
- 1940: Tante Pose as Ruth Bals
- 1941: Den forsvundne pølsemaker as Solveig Brand
- 1942: Det æ'kke te å tru as Unni Borg
- 1942: Den farlige leken as Ellinor
- 1942: En herre med bart as Claire, Mrs. Niehlsen's daughter
- 1943: Den nye lægen as Rigmor, Ulrick's daughter
- 1954: I moralens navn as Sussie Krahn-Johnsen, Alf Mowitz's former wife
