= Våre falne 1939–1945 =

Norwegian encyclopedia

Våre falne 1939–1945 is a biographical encyclopaedia with short articles on Norwegians who lost their lives due to war-related reasons during World War II. The encyclopaedia was issued in four volumes from 1949 to 1951, by the Norwegian government, and contains around 11,000 biographies. The main editor was Arne Ording, with Gudrun Johnson and Johan Garder being responsible for the biographies.

The editorial committee consisted of Aslaug Aasland, Gustav Natvig-Pedersen, Otto Lous Mohr, Einar Diesen, Erling Bryn and Markus Endresen.

The encyclopaedia has been made available on-line.
