= Andrine og Kjell =

- Directed by: Kåre Bergstrøm
- Written by: Kåre Bergstrøm; Gisken Wildenvey
- Starring: Inger Marie Andersen; Toralv Maurstad; Ingeborg Steffens
- Edited by: Olav Engebretsen
- Release date: 10 March 1952
- Running time: 85 minutes
- Country: Norway
- Language: Norwegian

Andrine og Kjell is a 1952 Norwegian drama film directed and co-written by Kåre Bergstrøm, starring Inger Marie Andersen and Toralv Maurstad. Andrine (Andersen), 17, is attending a private secondary school, and rents a room with the family of her classmate Kjell (Maurstad). She is at first put off by Kjell's rebellious behaviour, but gradually begins to understand him and realizes that although their backgrounds are not similar, the problems they face are. The two fall in love.
