= Jan Thomas Njerve =

Norwegian painter

Jan Thomas Njerve (7 June 1927 – 17 November 2014) was a Norwegian painter.

He was born in Eidanger Municipality, and was married to opera singer Kari Frisell. He attended the Norwegian National Academy of Fine Arts from 1946 to 1948, and also trained abroad. He is known as a landscape painter, among others with the work Spansk landskap (1960) owned by the National Gallery of Norway, and as a portrait painter, among others of Olav V of Norway and Harald V of Norway.
