= Bjurra =

1970 film

- Directed by: Kåre Bergstrøm
- Written by: Odd Hjort Sørensen
- Starring: Henki Kolstad; Inger Marie Andersen
- Release date: 1970
- Running time: 83 minutes
- Country: Norway
- Language: Norwegian

Bjurra is a 1970 Norwegian drama film directed by Kåre Bergstrøm, starring Henki Kolstad and Inger Marie Andersen.

Bjurra is an abandoned fishing village on Lofoten island. One summer the place is visited by thirteen children from a boarding school, along with their caretaker Pedersen (Kolstad) and his wife (Andersen). When Mrs. Pedersen one day breaks her leg and needs to be hospitalized, the children take over the care of the island. They establish a newspaper and a sports clubs and stage a play. The children even write a constitution and select a municipal council and a president. In a short while, Bjurra develops into a viable community, with the children's caretaker, Pedersen, as honorary citizen.
