= En herre med bart =

- Directed by: Alfred Maurstad
- Written by: Finn Bø (play)
- Starring: Per Aabel; Wenche Foss
- Release date: 1942
- Running time: 92 minutes
- Country: Norway
- Language: Norwegian

En herre med bart (English: A Gentleman with a Moustache) is a 1942 Norwegian comedy film directed by Alfred Maurstad, based on a play by Finn Bø, and starring Per Aabel and Wenche Foss. Attorney Ole Grong (Aabel) and his wife Cecilie (Foss) are having marital difficulties. They decide on a divorce. Both separately leave to recuperate. Complications arise when they check into the same hotel.

== Cast ==
- Per Aabel as Ole Grong, a lawyer
- Wenche Foss as Cecilie, his wife
- Lauritz Falk as Bomann, an operetta and gramophone charmer
- Eva Lunde as Claire, Mrs. Niehlsen's daughter
- Liv Bredal as Miss Helvik, a spa guest
- Lydia Opøien as Rosa Niehlsen
- Arvid Nilssen as Fixen, a handyman
- Joachim Holst-Jensen as Nils, Miriam's husband
- Guri Stormoen as Miriam, the lady in the light box
- Bjarne Bø as Gabrielsen, a masseur
- Gunvor Hall as Mrs. Snarum
- Alfhild Stormoen as a fortune teller
- Carl Struve as Byberg, a mason
- Gunnar Olram as Eliassen, an attorney
- Einar Vaage as Tønnesen, a doctor
- Dagmar Myhrvold as Thea, the housekeeper at the Grong house
