= Johannes Ording =

Norwegian theologian

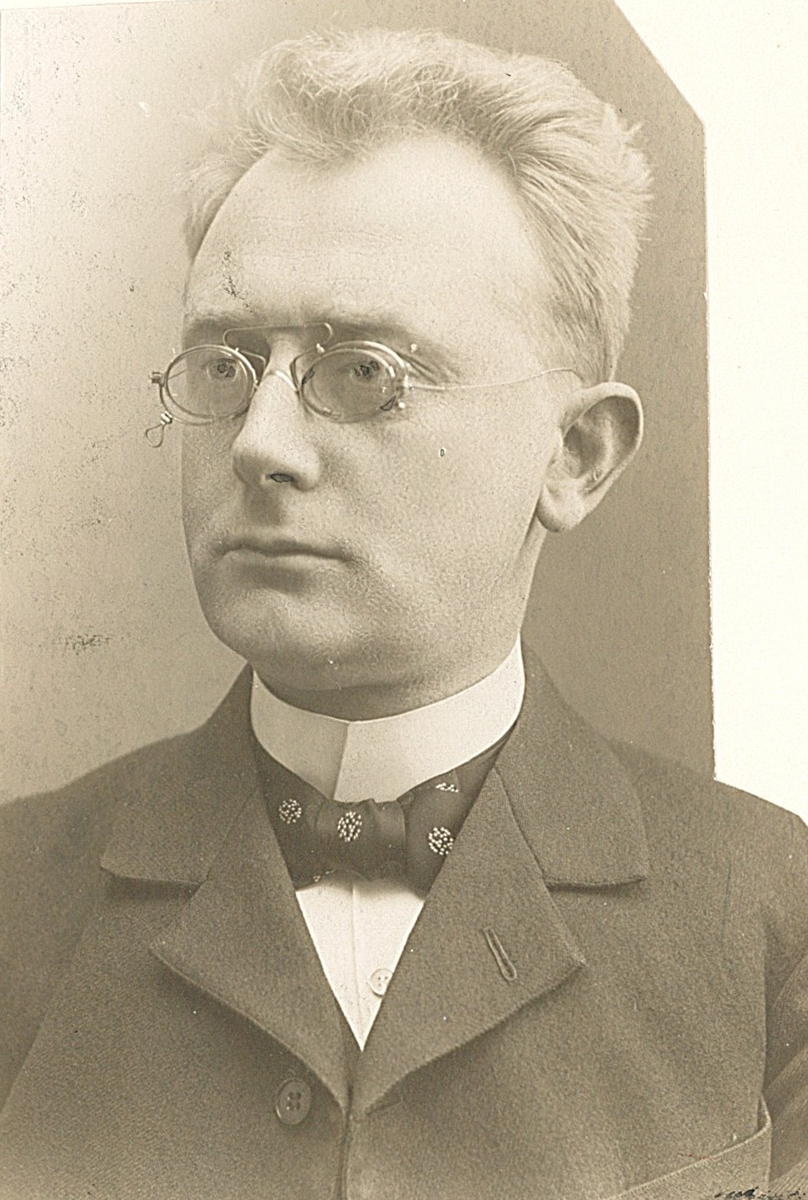
Johannes Ording portrait

Johannes Ording (19 January 1869 – 25 January 1929) was a Norwegian theologian. He served as a professor of systematic theology at the Royal Frederick University from 1906 to 1926, and his appointment caused a stir because some saw him as too liberal.

== Personal life ==
He was born in Drammen as a son of rector Jørgen Fredrik Ording (1832–1888) and his wife Marie Benedicte Wildhagen (1845–1913). He was a brother of educator and politician Fredrik Ording, and an uncle of actor Jørn Ording.

In June 1896 he married Fredrikke Ording (1874–1966). Fredrikke Ording was Johannes' first cousin, and also a sister of Hans Nielsen Hauge Ording, niece of Hans Nilsen Hauge, granddaughter of Andreas Hauge and great-granddaughter of Hans Nielsen Hauge. Fredrikke and Johannes had a son, Arne Ording, who became a notable historian and politician.

== Career ==
He took the examen artium in 1886, and the cand.theol. degree in 1893. From 1894 to 1900 he was a curate at St. John's Church in Kristiania (in Norwegian the church was called Johanneskirken, sharing Ording's given name). He also worked as a teacher. In 1900 he left his church job to study, first three years with funding from a legatee, then from 1903 as research fellow at the Royal Frederick University. In the same year he took the dr.theol. degree with the thesis Den religiøse Erkjendelse, dens Art og Vished.

In 1903 professor of theology died Fredrik Petersen, and there were problems with appointing a successor. In 1904 Ording was deemed to be the only qualified candidate, but he was not appointed. Certain people saw him as too liberal, as he was inspired by Albrecht Ritschl. In 1905, there was another attempt to appoint a successor for Petersen, and this time six foreign academics had been summoned to judge the candidates. Five of them supported Ording, and the Faculty of Theology asked that Ording be appointed, except for professor Sigurd Odland, who dissented. The collegium (board) of the university agreed, and in January 1906 the Council of State made the final decision to appoint Ording. Christoffer Knudsen resigned as Minister of Church Affairs, Sigurd Odland resigned as professor, and the more conservative MF Norwegian School of Theology was founded as a response.

Ording's most notable release after this was Den kristelige tro ("The Christian Faith"), released in two volumes in 1915. Other releases include Gammel og moderne kristendomsopfatning ("Old and Modern Perception of Christianity", 1906) and Kristelig etik ("Christian Ethics", 1927). Ording did not write the latter book himself, but dictated it as he lay ill. He had suffered from a stroke in 1921, and spent much of his time on sick leave until finally resigning as a professor in 1926. His last notable publication was an essay in Samtiden in 1929. He died in January 1929 in Bærum.
