= Kari Frisell =

Norwegian singer and pedagogue (1922–2022)

- Born: 20 August 1922; Oslo, Norway
- Died: 3 June 2022 (aged 99); Oslo
- Occupations: Operatic soprano and pedagogue
- Spouse: Jan Thomas Njerve
- Awards: Norwegian Music Critics Award (1963/64)

Kari Frisell (20 August 1922 – 3 June 2022) was a Norwegian operatic soprano and pedagogue.

== Musical career ==
Frisell studied under Mimi Hviid in Oslo, and further in Vienna and New York. She made her concert debut in Oslo in 1946. In 1946 she also performed as Michaela in Bizet's opera Carmen, staged in Bergen. She also starred in the 1946 film Vi vil leve. She was assigned with the Norwegian National Opera from its inaugural year in 1958 to 1971. As song pedagogue Frisell was assigned with the Oslo Conservatory of Music from 1970, and with the Norwegian Academy of Music from 1973 to 1988.

She was awarded the Norwegian Music Critics Award for 1963/64.

== Personal life and death ==
Frisell was born in Oslo on 20 August 1922. She was married to painter Jan Thomas Njerve. She died in Oslo on 3 June 2022, aged 99.
