= Bastard (1940 film) =

1940 film

- Directed by: Helge Lunde; Gösta Stevens
- Written by: Helge Lunde
- Based on: Basterd by F.W. Remmler
- Produced by: Knut Næss; Helge Lunde
- Starring: Georg Løkkeberg; Signe Hasso; Alfred Maurstad
- Cinematography: Adrian Bjurman; Rudolf Frederiksen; Ulf Greber; Per Jonson; Reidar Lund
- Edited by: Rudolf Frederiksen; Helge Lunde
- Music by: Jolly Kramer-Johansen
- Production companies: Lunde Film; Sveafilm
- Distributed by: Capitol Film
- Release date: 5 February 1940
- Running time: 87 minutes
- Countries: Norway; Sweden
- Language: Norwegian

Bastard or The Song of the Wilderness (Swedish: Vildmarkens sång) is a 1940 Norwegian-Swedish drama film directed by Helge Lunde and Gösta Stevens and starring Georg Løkkeberg, Signe Hasso and Alfred Maurstad. The story is based on the story "Basterd" by F. W. Remmler.

== Cast ==
- Georg Løkkeberg as Burtaj
- Signe Hasso as Aitanga, nomadepike
- Alfred Maurstad as Wasilj, bondegutt
- Gabriel Alw as Amgan
- Hilda Borgström as Taina
- Georg Blickingberg as Jarlule
- Sven Bergvall as En orotsjonhøvding
- Emil Fjellström as Prison Guard
- Kristian Hefte as Russer
- Joachim Holst-Jensen as En fangevokter
- Karl Holter as Iwan
- Holger Löwenadler as County Sheriff
- Gunnar Olram as En orotsjon
- Bjørg Riiser-Larsen as Orotsjohøvdingens datter
- Guri Stormoen as Russisk pike
- Einar Vaage as En orotsjon

== Bibliography ==
- Qvist, Per Olov & von Bagh, Peter. Guide to the Cinema of Sweden and Finland. Greenwood Publishing Group, 2000.
