= Alf Scott-Hansen Jr. =

Norwegian engineer and film director

Alf Scott-Hansen (22 December 1903 – 1961) was a Norwegian engineer and film director.

He was born in Kristiania as a son of port director Alf Scott-Hansen Sr. and his wife Lalla Wiborg. He was a nephew of Commander Sigurd Scott-Hansen.

He finished his secondary education in 1922, served in the King's Guard before studying electrical engineering at his father's alma mater, the Dresden University of Technology. The studies in Dresden were interrupted and he instead graduated in engineering from Edinburgh in 1928. He worked in Siemens in Norway until 1942, then in Sønnico from the early 1950s to his death.

He was married to actress Wenche Foss from 1939. Before the marriage was dissolved, the couple were active socialites in Norway's capital. During this period Scott-Hansen also forayed into the film industry, directing the films Rikard Nordraak in 1945 and Trollfossen in 1948. During parts of the occupation of Norway by Nazi Germany, he was imprisoned in Grini concentration camp from April to November 1942.

On 16 July 1961 he was found deceased at his cabin in Skåtøy, where he was vacationing alone.
