= Clarté (Norway) =

Norwegian socialist and pacifist organisation

Clarté (French for "clarity") was a socialist and pacifist organisation in Norway.

It was founded in 1925, and had its roots in a French-based international organization of the same name. The international organization became defunct in 1923, but French and Swedish branches existed, and Danish and Finnish branches came in 1925 and 1926.

In Norway, Clarté was strongly affiliated with the organization Mot Dag, and Mot Dag's Arne Ording was chairman. Ording also edited the organization's periodical, also named Clarté. This was published between 1929 and 1931. Another Norwegian, Aake Anker Ording, was secretary-general of Nordisk Clartéforbund (the Nordic Clarté Association) from 1927. Clarté in Norway existed until 1936, when it was reorganized with the new name Forum. Mot Dag was disestablished in the same year.

It split in 1940. In light of the Winter War, then-chairman of Forum, Gudmund Harlem, proposed that communists be barred from membership in the organization. 74 voted for, 78 voted against, and the minority left the organization to form Sosialistisk Studentlag.
