= Bjørg Riiser-Larsen =

Norwegian actress (1916–2000)

- Born: September 28, 1916; Horten, Norway
- Died: August 13, 2000 (aged 83); Oslo, Norway
- Occupation: Actress

Bjørg Riiser-Larsen (September 28, 1916 – August 13, 2000) was a Norwegian actress.

Riiser-Larsen appeared in several Norwegian films, and in 2006 the magazine Rushprint named her the greatest Norwegian film diva of all time. On the Rushprint website, the writer Kjell Ola Dahl describes Riiser-Larsen as a "film noir diva" and "femme fatale." Her starring role in the film Døden er et kjærtegn was a strong contributor to this assessment.

== Filmography ==
- 1940: Bastard as the daughter of an Oroch chieftain
- 1941: Hansen og Hansen as a girlfriend
- 1942: Den farlige leken as Bjørg, a guest
- 1943: Vigdis as Gerda Storm, Falck's fiancée
- 1949: Døden er et kjærtegn as Sonja Rentoft
