= Albert Wiesener =

Norwegian lawyer (1902–1986)

Albert Wiesener (3 January 1902 – 27 June 1986) was a Norwegian lawyer.

He graduated with the cand.jur. degree in 1925, he studied in Berlin from 1926 and 1927. He joined the Norwegian fascist party Nasjonal Samling (NS), which was established in 1933, and was a central figure in the party's founding and relative success (two city council seats in its first election outing) in Hamar. He was their first ballot candidate in the Market towns of Hedmark and Oppland counties in the 1936 general election, but was not elected. In Hamar he also chaired the tennis group in Hamar IL in 1930. He left the party in 1937. As a Germanophile, his thinking clashed with the Norwegian cultural nationalism of Nasjonal Samling chairman Vidkun Quisling.

In 1939 Wiesener became a barrister with access to work with cases in the Supreme Court. During the German occupation of Norway, from 1940 to 1945, he worked as a defender for members of the Norwegian resistance who were tried in Nazi-controlled courts. Among others he was the defender of Gunnar Eilifsen, the first Norwegian during the occupation to receive the death sentence from a Norwegian court.

Nonetheless, as a part of the legal purge in Norway after World War II, Wiesener received a small sentence for a piece he wrote in 1940. He was active in the Nazi movement in the spring and summer of 1940, when Quisling's first period as a national leader was over, and the German occupants tried to find Germanophile collaborators in the Norwegian society. Wiesener held lectures in the German-controlled Norwegian Broadcasting Corporation, as did people like Jonas Lie, Johan Bernhard Hjort, and Ranik Halle. However, Wiesener and others faded into the background from July 1940, as Nasjonal Samling and its members returned to the upper echelons.

Wiesener criticized the legal purge in the 1964 book Seierherrens justis. He had previously published Nordmenn for tysk krigsrett (1954), chronicling his time as a defender. He died in 1986.
