= Sigurd Odland =

Norwegian theologian (1857–1937)

Sigurd Vilhelm Odland
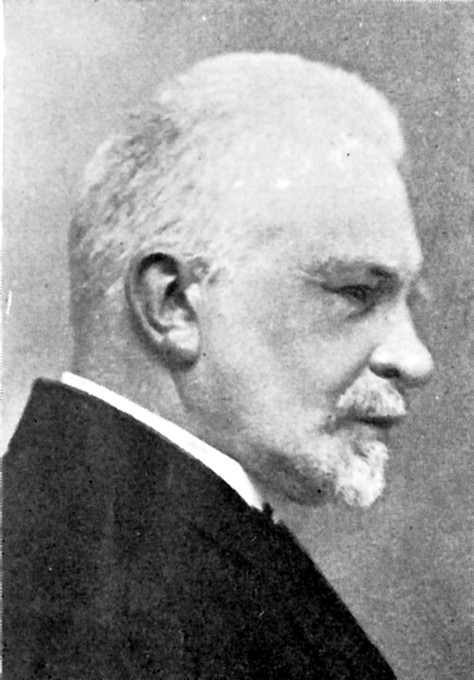
- Born: December 5, 1857; Bergen, Norway
- Died: April 30, 1937 (aged 79); Oslo, Norway
- Resting place: Cemetery of Our Saviour
- Occupation: Theologian

Sigurd Vilhelm Odland (December 5, 1857 – April 30, 1937) was a Norwegian theologian and church leader.

Odland was born in Bergen. After receiving his theology degree in 1879, he studied at various universities in Germany. He was the recipient of university stipends for many years until 1894, when he became a professor of theology at the University of Oslo, specializing in New Testament studies.

Odland's background was in the Haugean movement and he supported a strong and consistent approach to theology. When the liberal theologian Johannes Ording was named a professor of theology in 1906, Odland, like the minister of church affairs Christopher Knudsen, quit in protest. A number of people in the circle around Odland then joined forces to form an independent institution for educating priests, the MF Norwegian School of Theology, which was founded in 1907. Odland became a professor of New Testament studies at the institution.

In 1892, Odland succeeded Gisle Johnson as head of the Norwegian Lutheran Inner Mission Society, but he left the society in 1911 because the general assembly had decided that women should have voting rights in the organization. In 1916 he also left the school of theology because he was unable to educate priests for the Church of Norway after it was allowed for women to hold talks and so on in the churches. He later taught at the China Mission Society's (the Norwegian Lutheran Mission's) school until 1924.

Odland published a number of theological works.

Odland became a member of the Norwegian Academy of Science and Letters in 1892. In 1904 he was named a knight first class of the Order of St. Olav.

He is buried in the Cemetery of Our Saviour in Oslo.
