= Tord Godal =

20th and 21st-century Norwegian bishop and theologian

The Right Reverend Tord Godal
- Church: Church of Norway

Personal details
- Born: 27 June 1909 Stavanger, Norway
- Died: 27 February 2002 (aged 92) Trondheim, Norway
- Denomination: Christian
- Parents: Ingvald Godal; Anne Helene Olsen
- Spouse: Hild Hulaas (1934-2000)
- Occupation: Priest
- Education: cand.theol. (1932) dr.theol. (1947)
- Alma mater: University of Oslo

Tord Godal (27 June 1909 – 27 February 2002) was a Norwegian theologian and bishop for the Diocese of Nidaros. He was decorated Commander of the Royal Norwegian Order of St. Olav in 1969. Godal was also a Freemason.

Godal was born on 27 June 1909 in Stavanger, Norway. He was educated in theology, receiving his cand.theol. degree in 1932 and his dr.theol. degree in 1947. He served as a pastor in various positions in the Diocese of Oslo between 1934 and 1940. He was a chaplain in Trondheim from 1940 to 1948, resident chaplain at Bakke Church in Trondheim from 1948 to 1956, and Dean of the Oslo Cathedral from 1956 to 1960. He was bishop of the Diocese of Nidaros from 1960 to 1979, the longest serving bishop in Nidaros during the 20th century. He also served as praeses of the Royal Norwegian Society of Sciences and Letters from 1966 to 1973. Godal died in Trondheim on 27 February 2002.

== Selected works ==
- Kristen seksual-moral (1939)
- Meditasjonen og dens betydning for erkjennelsen (1947)
- Tilbake til troen. Religiøs fundamentalisme (1949)
- Meditasjon: En veg for Guds ord til den enkelte (1979)

Church of Norway titles
Preceded by Arne Fjellbu	Bishop of Nidaros; 1960–1979	Succeeded by Kristen Kyrre Bremer
Academic offices
Preceded by Harald Wergeland	Praeses of the Royal Norwegian Society of Sciences and Letters; 1966–1973	Succeeded by Sigmund Selberg
