= Edvin Alten =

Norwegian judge

Edvin Alten (10 January 1876 – 13 February 1967) was a Norwegian judge.

He was born in Tønsberg. He worked as deputy under-secretary of State in the Ministry of Justice and the Police from 1918, and as a Supreme Court Justice from 1925 to 1948.

He was married to Ragna Aass (1880–1975). His daughter Berit was an actress and married the literary historian Asbjørn Aarnes, and his daughter Rønnaug was also an actress, and was married to Georg Løkkeberg for some years.
