= Kolbjørn Buøen =

Norwegian actor

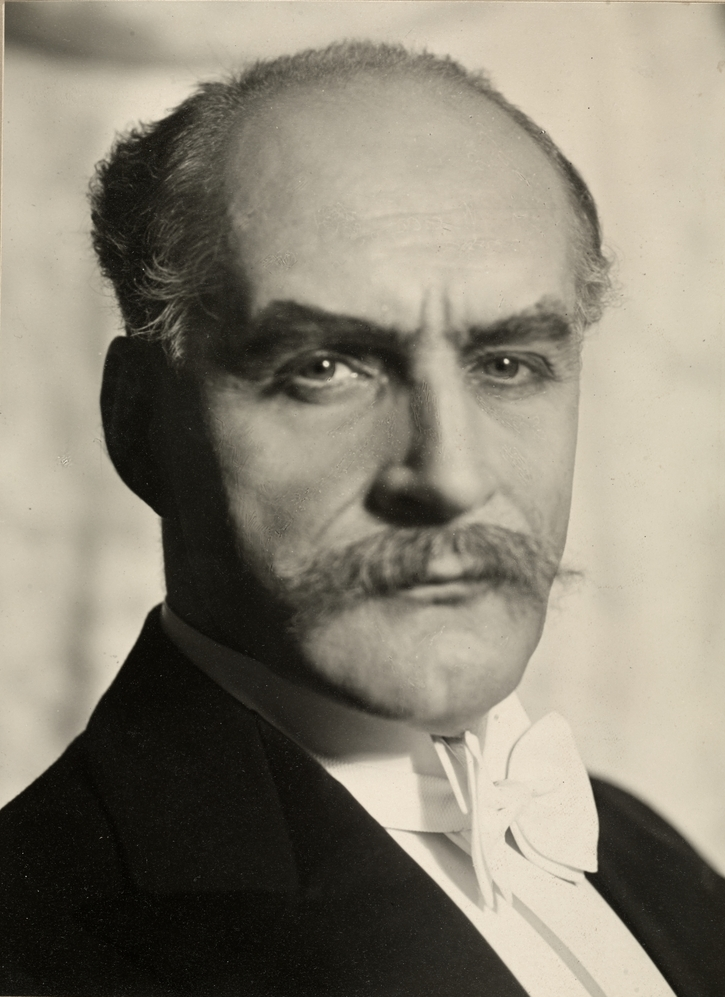
- Skuespilleren Kolbjørn Buøen ca. 1940
- Born: 20 January 1895
- Died: 5 October 1975 (aged 80)
- Resting place: Vestre gravlund

Kolbjørn Buøen (20 January 1895 – 5 October 1975) was a Norwegian actor. He was born in Flå. He made his stage debut at Den Nationale Scene in Bergen in 1920. He played "the hangman" in the first stage adaptation of Pär Lagerkvist's Bödeln in 1934, a play that received much attention. Buøen was appointed at Den Nationale Scene from 1920 to 1938, and thereafter at Nationaltheatret from 1938 to 1965. He made his film debut in 1951, in Kranes konditori. He received the Norwegian Theatre Critics Award in 1957.
