= Tørres Snørtevold =

1940 Norwegian comedy film directed by Tancred Ibsen

- Directed by: Tancred Ibsen
- Written by: Alexander Kielland (novel); Tancred Ibsen (screenplay)
- Starring: Alfred Maurstad; Folkman Schaanning; Anton Jessen
- Cinematography: Kåre Bergstrøm
- Release date: 1940
- Running time: 102 minutes
- Country: Norway
- Language: Norwegian

Tørres Snørtevold is a 1940 Norwegian comedy film directed by Tancred Ibsen. It starred Alfred Maurstad, Folkman Schaanning and Anton Jessen and was based on the 1891 novel Jacob by Alexander Kielland.
