= Kåre Bergstrøm =

Norwegian film director and screenwriter

- Born: 3 February 1911; Värmland, Sweden
- Died: 24 June 1976 (aged 65); Oslo
- Occupations: Film photographer and director

Kåre Bergstrøm (3 February 1911 – 24 June 1976) was a Swedish-born cinematographer and film director who settled in Norway.

Bergstrøm was born in Värmland. He was assigned with the film production company Norsk Film from 1933, and eventually became took up cinematography. He was the cinematographer for Toralf Sandø's film Den forsvundne pølsemaker from 1941, Tancred Ibsen's film Den farlige leken from 1942, Rasmus Breistein's Trysil-Knut from 1942, and Alfred Maurstad's comedy En herre med bart from 1942. After World War II he was the cinematographer for Edith Carlmar's film debut Døden er et kjærtegn, and Ibsen's To mistenkelige personer, which was eventually denied a public showing after a judgement by the Supreme Court of Norway. His first film as director was the love story Andrine og Kjell from 1952. He further directed the comedy Det kunne vært deg (1952), the war documentary Blodveien (1955), about Yugoslav slave workers in Norway during World War II, the thriller Lake of the Dead (1958), based on a crime novel by André Bjerke, a biographical film about Hans Nielsen Hauge (1961), Klokker i måneskinn (1964), and the children's film Bjurra (1970).
