= Ut av mørket =

1958 film

- Directed by: Arild Brinchmann
- Written by: Arild Brinchmann; Alex Brinchmann
- Starring: Urda Arneberg
- Cinematography: Sverre Bergli
- Release date: 27 February 1958
- Running time: 104 minutes
- Country: Norway
- Language: Norwegian

Ut av mørket (English: Out of the Dark) is a 1958 Norwegian film directed by Arild Brinchmann. It was entered into the 8th Berlin International Film Festival.

== Cast ==
- Urda Arneberg as Kari Holm
- Pål Skjønberg as Per Holm, an architect
- Ola Isene as Enger, the chief physician
- Marit Halset as Doctor Krag
- Mona Hofland as Liv Holst, Per Holm's colleague
- Turid Steen as the patient
- Alfred Maurstad as the director
- Erling Lindahl as the physician
- Evy Engelsborg as the nurse
- Betzy Holter
- Anita Rummelhoff
