= Arild Brinchmann =

Norwegian film director (1922–1986)

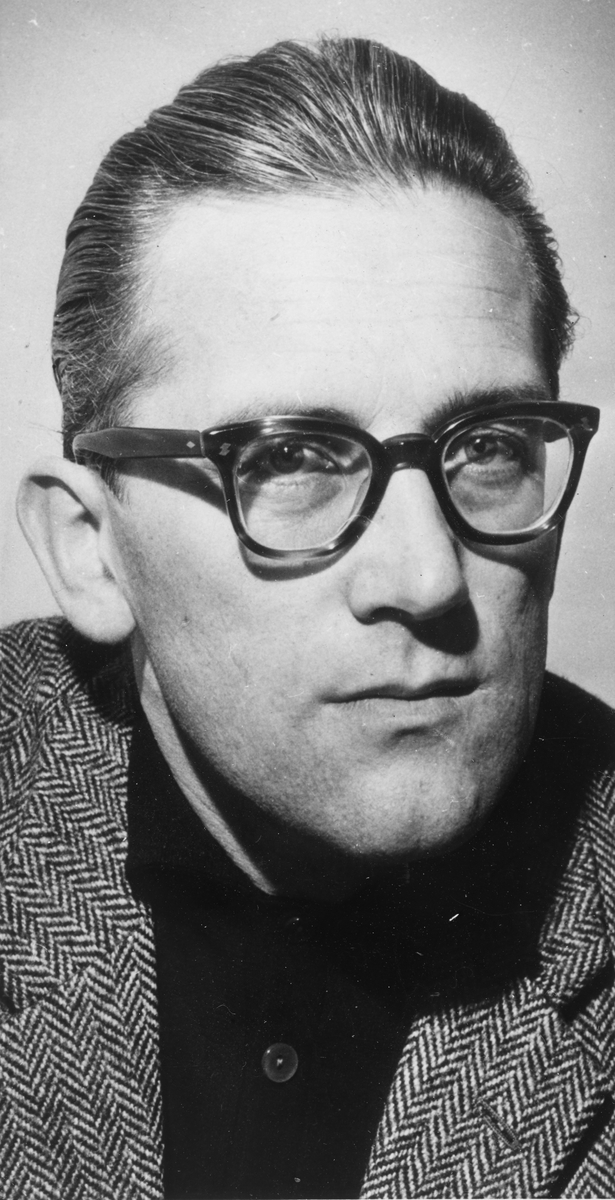
- Brinchmann in 1967
- Born: 31 January 1922; Kristiania, Norway
- Died: 9 October 1986 (aged 64)
- Occupation(s): stage producer, film producer and theatre director
- Spouses: Urda Arneberg (m. 1961); Monna Tandberg (m. 1972)
- Parent: Alex Brinchmann

Arild Brinchmann (31 January 1922 – 9 October 1986) was a Norwegian stage producer, film producer and theatre director.

He was born in Kristiania son of psychologist and writer Alex Brinchmann. He produced the films Blodveien (1955), Ut av mørket (1958), and Høysommer (1958). Ut av mørket was entered into the 8th Berlin International Film Festival. He built up the theatre department of the Norwegian Broadcasting Corporation, and was leader for Fjernsynsteatret from 1959 to 1967. He was theatre director at the National Theatre from 1967 to 1978.

Cultural offices
Preceded by Erik Kristen-Johanssen	Director of the National Theatre; 1967–1978	Succeeded by Toralv Maurstad
