= Jørn Ording =

Norwegian actor and screenwriter

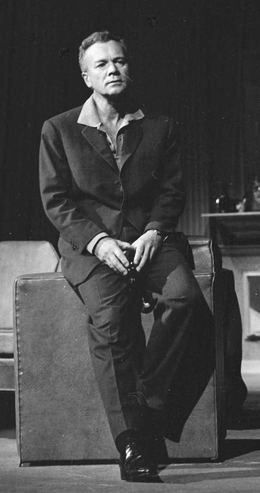
- Born: 21 February 1916

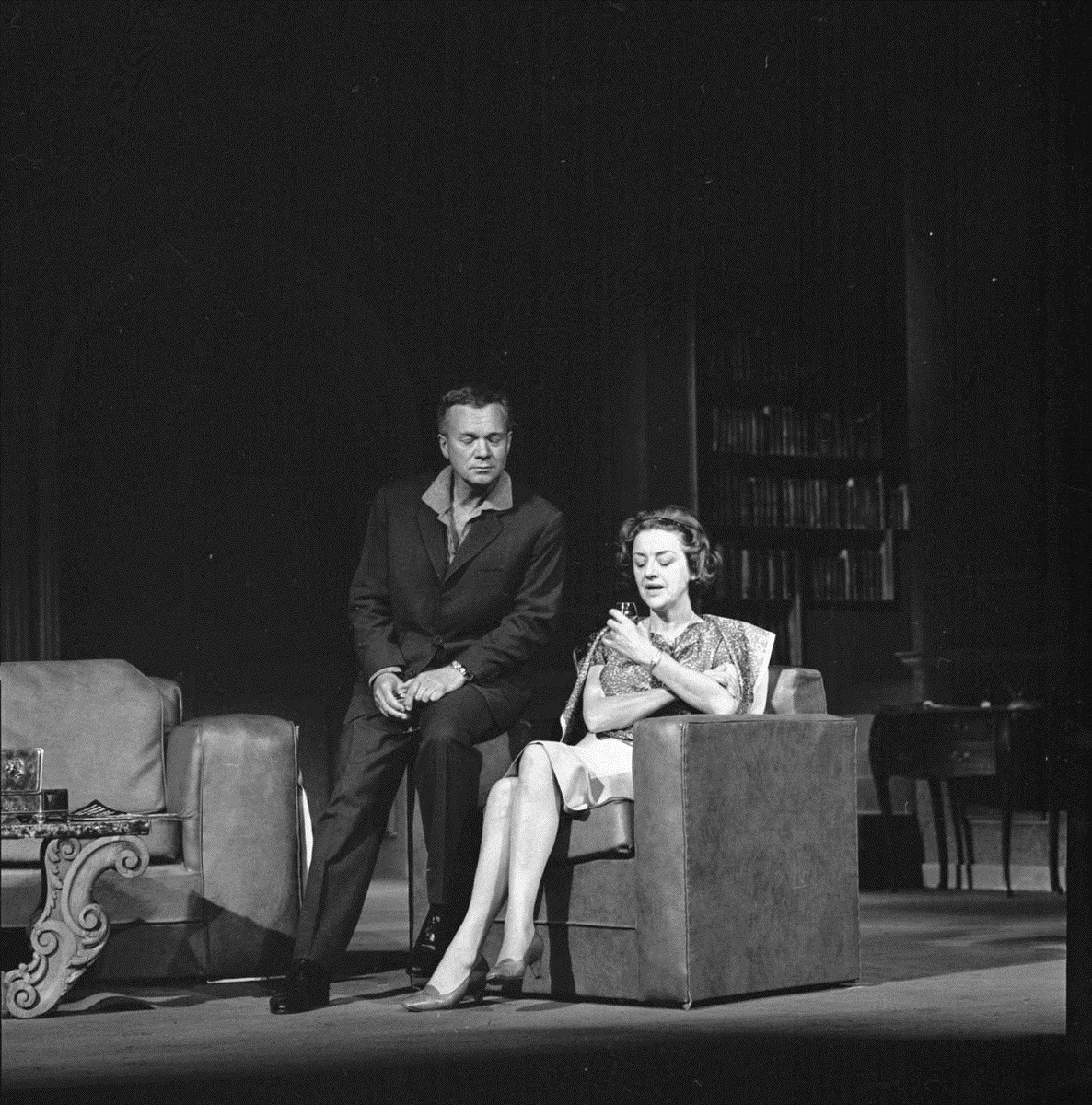
Jørn Ording with actress Aase Bye in 1967

Jørn Ording (21 February 1916 – 11 March 2001) was a Norwegian actor, theatre instructor and screenwriter.

He was born in Kristiania as a son of Jørgen Fredrik Ording (1880–1930). He was also a nephew of Fredrik and Johannes Ording, a first cousin of Arne Ording, a second cousin of Aake Anker Ording and a first cousin once removed of Hans Ording.

He made his stage debut in 1938 at Den Nationale Scene, and was hired at the National Theatre in 1939. From 1944 to 1945, during the German occupation of Norway, he was in exile in Sweden, working at Fri Norsk Scene. He returned to the National Theatre after the war and worked there until his retirement.

He also appeared in films, including Rikard Nordraak (1945), Englandsfarere (1946), The Viking Watch of the Danish Seaman (1948), Ukjent mann (1951), and Kasserer Jensen (1954). He wrote the screenplay for films such as Støv på hjernen (1959).
