= Urda Arneberg =

Norwegian actress (1929–2000)

- Arneberg in the television film Bernardas hus (1964)
- Born: 26 January 1929; Oslo, Norway
- Died: 14 May 2000 (aged 71)
- Occupation: Actress
- Years active: 1949-1989

Urda Arneberg (26 January 1929 – 14 May 2000) was a Norwegian actress.

Arneberg made her stage debut at Det Norske Teatret in 1948. She was employed at Riksteatret and Folketeatret 1953 to 1960, and then at Fjernsynsteatret 1960 to 1962. After that, she was employed at the National Theatre from 1962 to 1974, the Trøndelag Teater from 1974 to 1976 and the National Theatre again from 1976.

She appeared in at least 17 films and television shows between 1949 and 1989. A notable appearance was the film Ut av mørket, which was entered into the 8th Berlin International Film Festival.

== Selected filmography ==
- 1951: Ukjent mann
- 1956: Gylne ungdom
- 1958: Ut av mørket
- 1959: The Master and His Servants
- 1974: Bobby's War
- 1974: Kimen
