= ALTEN =

Company

- Traded as: Euronext Paris: ATE; CAC Mid 60 Component
- ISIN: FR0000071946
- Industry: Information technology Consulting; Outsourcing
- Founded: 1988 by Simon Azoulay, Laurent Schwarz and Thierry Woog
- Headquarters: 221 bis, boulevard Jean Jaurès; 92100 Boulogne-Billancourt, France
- Revenue: ▲€4.099 billion (2025)
- Net income: ▲€106.9 million
- Number of employees: 57,400 (end 2025)
- Website: www.alten.com

ALTEN is a French multinational engineering and technology services consulting company founded in 1988, it has offices in 30 countries. ALTEN's stock is listed in compartment B of the Euronext Paris market (ISIN FR0000071946); it is part of the SBF 120, the IT CAC 50 index and MIDCAP 100, and is eligible for the Deferred Settlement Service (SRD).

In 2025, ALTEN had 57,400 employees and reported a revenue of 4.10 Bn euros. The French market accounts for 35% of the group's activity.

== Company profile ==
ALTEN operates as a technology consulting and engineering company worldwide. It provides design and research projects for the technical and information systems divisions in the industrial, telecommunications, and service sectors. It is engaged in the studies and conception of technological products for technical divisions. The company also provides networks and telecoms architecture, as well as develops IT systems for information systems departments.

ALTEN provides services in industries such as telecommunications, computer systems, networking, multimedia, defense, aviation, and information systems.

== History ==
ALTEN was founded in 1988 by Simon Azoulay, Laurent Schwarz and Thierry Woog; three engineers from major schools.

Development of its establishment in France and expansion of its activities between 1988 and 1997, then IPO in 1999 on the second market of the Paris Stock Exchange. The international development started in 2000 represented 20% of turnover in 2003. Expansion towards Asia and the United States in 2012. The Group has since pursued a strategy of targeted business acquisitions in line with its core business in Europe, particularly in 2016. Thus, in 2019, the international share represented 56.8% of Group revenue.

== Organization ==
The ALTEN Group is organized into 5 operating divisions :

- Paris Engineering and Technology Consulting (ETC) Division
- Paris Networks Telecoms & Information Systems (NTIS) Division
- French Regions Division
- International Division
- Solutions Division: specialized and transnational companies among which MI-GSO (PMO and program management), Anotech Energy (oil and gas operations), Atexis (customer support engineering), Avenir Conseil (technical training) and PCU3ED (Global leader in Program and Project Management)

== Services ==
- Engineering and R&D outsourcing
- IT & network services
- Consulting, expertise and customer support

== Acquisitions ==
In 2011 the company acquired Calsoft Labs (India and USA), Bardenheuer (Germany), Enea Consulting (Sweden).

In 2014 the company acquired cPrime Inc.(USA)

In 2015 the company acquired EclipseIT BV (The Netherlands)

In 2019 the company acquired Quick Release (UK)

In 2020, the company acquired ITSector (Portugal), expanding into IT consultancy for financial institutions.

In 2022 the company acquired Volansys (India and USA) and AP Solutions (Korea)

In 2023 the company acquired Ayesa Air Control (Spain and Germany)

== Labor disputes in Alten Spain ==
From July to December 2012, Alten Spain fired more than a hundred employees, claiming a sales decrease. In December 2012 Alten Spain tried to fire 140 of its employees and impose a 10% pay cut on the rest. As a consequence, Alten workers called for strike in January 2013.
