= Aake Anker Ording =

Norwegian civil servant and politician

Aake Anker Ording (18 December 1899 – 1979) was a Norwegian civil servant and politician for Mot Dag and the Labour Party.

He was born in Halden. He was a second cousin of actor Jørn Ording and historian and politician Arne Ording, and a first cousin once removed of educator and theologian Fredrik Ording and theologian Hans Nielsen Hauge Ording. He graduated from the Royal Frederick University with the cand.jur. degree in 1924. While studying he joined a study circle of young, revolutionary intellectuals; Aake Anker Ording, Arne Ording, Erling Falk, Viggo Hansteen and Trond Hegna in particular. These would form the backbone of the group Mot Dag. In 1927 Ording became the first secretary-general of Nordisk Clartéforbund (the Nordic Clarté Association), which organized the Danish, Finnish, Norwegian and Swedish branches of the organization Clarté. He was probably aware of Erling Falk's infamous embezzlement of Norwegian Students' Society funds in 1926–1927, as he gradually became part of a Mot Dag "triumvirate" of Falk, himself and Gunnar Røise, but unlike Falk he was welcomed to the Labour Party when Mot Dag was dissolved in 1936. Ording was a member of Mot Dag's secretariat formed in 1935 when Falk drifted away as a leader, and was present (together with Arne Ording, Trond Hegna and Karl Evang) during membership discussion meetings with the Labour Party.

From 1924 to 1928 Ording worked in his own attorney's office together with Viggo Hansteen. From 1933 to 1940 he ran an attorney's office with Clarté leader Brynjulf Bull. He fled to the United Kingdom when World War II reached Norway in 1940. He was acting director of the Norwegian Broadcasting Corporation-in-exile before Toralf Øksnevad reached the United Kingdom from Sweden. He then worked in the Bank of Norway from 1940 to 1942, then as assistant secretary in the Norwegian Ministry of Provisioning and Reconstruction. In 1945 he became acting assistant secretary in the Norwegian Ministry of Foreign Affairs, and he was an advisor for the Norwegian delegation to the United Nations General Assembly in 1946. He was also a secretary for the Labour Party parliamentary group for some time. He worked in the United Nations Secretariat from 1947. During this period he became internationally known for initiating the fundraiser United Nations Appeal for Children. Wrote Time magazine; "the worldwide campaign ... was conceived by Norway's tall, blue-eyed, idealistic U.N. Staffer Aake Ording, to fill a gap left by the world's governments".

As a later Secretary of International Affairs in the Labour Party, Ording was a particularly strong supporter of Israel. As a defence industry consultant, he was a founding member of the Norwegian Israel Committee, in the wake of the Six-Day War. Haakon Lie was the first chairman. His second cousin and Mot Dag fellow Arne Ording became an important advisor for the Labour Party too. Aake Anker Ording died in 1979.
