= Hans Ording =

Norwegian theologian

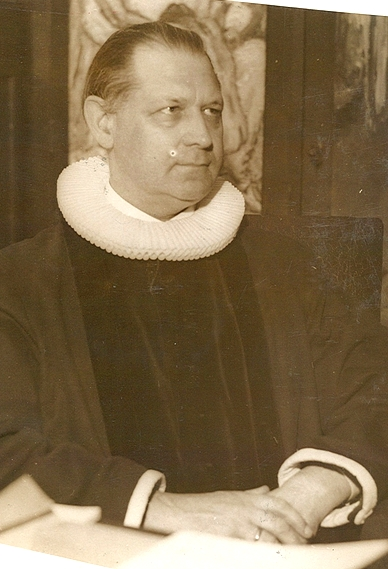
Hans Ording, c. 1940

Hans Nielsen Hauge Ording (17 August 1884 – 18 February 1952) was a Norwegian theologian.

== Biography ==
He was born in Solum Municipality as a son of dean Theodor Ording (1837–1908) and Johanne Gabrielle Gustava Andrea Hauge (1851–90). He was a grandson of Andreas Hauge, and great-grandson of Hans Nielsen Hauge. He was also a first cousin of Johannes Ording and Fredrik Ording, and thus a first cousin once removed of actor Jørn Ording, politician Aake Anker Ording and historian and politician Arne Ording.

He took the examen artium at Kristiania Cathedral School in 1902, and the cand.theol. degree in 1909. He worked in Tromsø and Hammerfest before being hired as a priest for Norwegians in Berlin in 1914. He married German citizen Annelise Fechter (1890–1984) in December 1916. In the same year he was appointed as a research fellow at the Royal Frederick University. He finished the thesis Untersuchungen über Entwicklungslehre und Teleologi in 1921, which earned him the Dr. Theol. degree in 1922.

After this he was a curate at Berg Municipality from 1922 to 1928, curate in Frogner from 1928 to 1935 and vicar in Frogner from 1935 to 1939. In 1939 he was appointed as professor at the University of Oslo, a position which had been vacant for a year, in waiting of Ording to finish the book Dogmatisk metode. In addition to his thesis and Dogmatisk metode, his most important work was Estetikk og kristendom (1929). He later co-published the works of his great-grandfather, Hans Nielsens Hauges Skrifter, in eight volumes between 1947 and 1954. He died in February 1952 in Oslo, before the last volume had been published.

== Selected works ==
- Untersuchungen über Entwicklungslehre und Teleologie (Berlin: Trowitzsch) 1921
- Estetikk og kristendom (Oslo: Aschehoug) 1929
- Dogmatisk metode (Oslo: Gyldendal) 1939
- For tro og tanke (Oslo: Aschehoug) 1950
