= Ranik Halle =

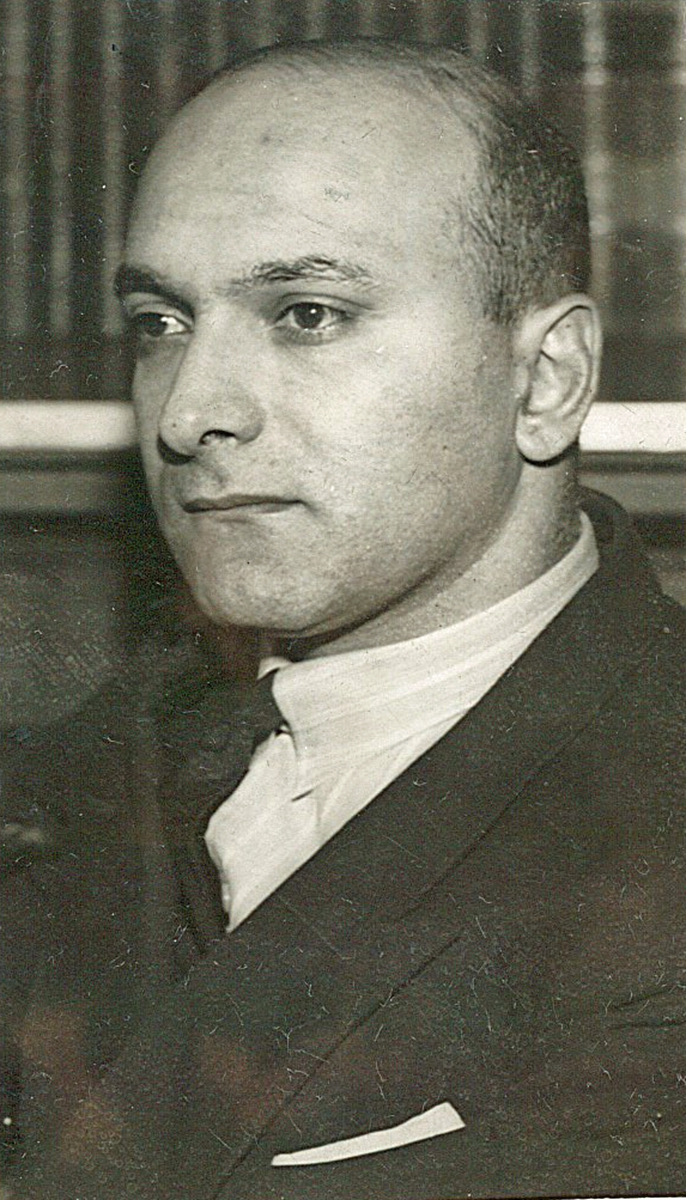
- Ranik Halle
- Born: 24 August 1905; Baku
- Died: 20 May 1987 (aged 81); Oslo, Norway
- Occupations: Newspaper editor Bridge player

Ranik Halle (né Andronik Saradscheff; 24 August 1905 – 20 May 1987) was a Russian-born Norwegian newspaper editor and bridge player. He was born in Baku. As a student in Oslo, he participated in politics and chaired the Norwegian Students' Society in 1928. He was active in Fedrelandslaget and edited the weekly newspaper ABC. From 1946 he started working for Høyres Pressekontor, eventually as editor and CEO. He was president of the Norwegian Bridge Federation from 1954 to 1964.
