= Tore Segelcke =

Norwegian actress (1901–1979)

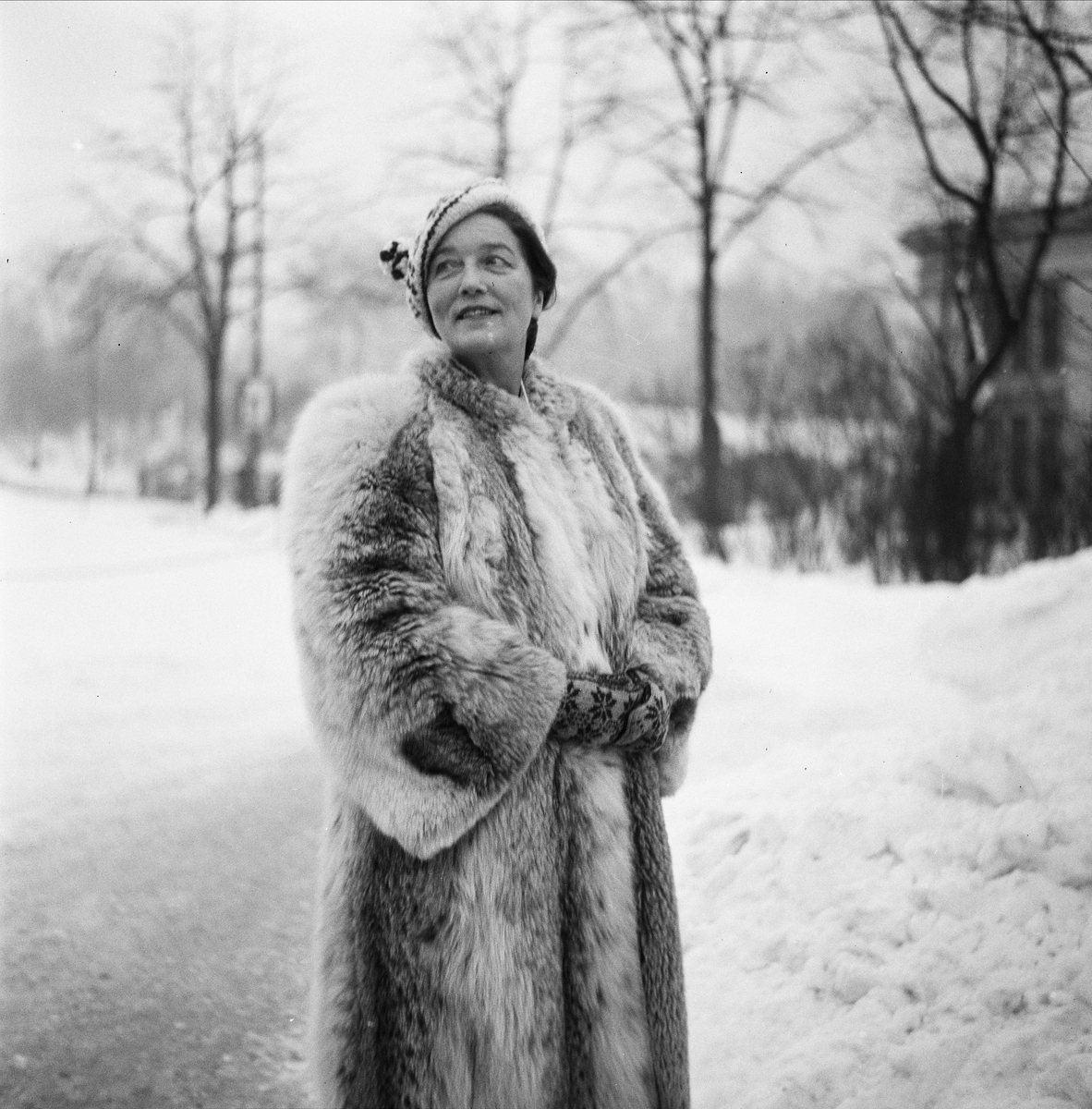
Tore Segelcke in January 1959

Tore Dyveke Segelcke (23 April 1901 – 22 September 1979) was a Norwegian actress.

== Biography ==
Tore Løkkeberg was born at Fredrikstad in Østfold, Norway. Her parents were Georg Løkkeberg (1872–1951) and Hulda Marie Hansen (1878–1941). She was the sister of actor Georg Løkkeberg (1909–1986).

She made her debut in 1921 touring with Det Norske Teatret where she was based until 1924. From then on she worked with Det Frie Teater, and then joined the Den Nationale Scene. In 1928 she went to Nationaltheatret, where she stayed until 1972, apart from two years (1933-35) at Det Nye Teater. She was one of Nationaltheatret's leading actresses in both classical and modern dramatics. She took a total of 104 roles at Nationaltheateret. In the 1950s, Segelcke set up her own Individual Theatre. In 1954, she went to many European cities. including Copenhagen, Paris and Vienna, with her "One Woman Show", with extracts from Bergliot by Bjørnstjerne Bjørnson Medea by Jean Anouilh and Din stemme by Jean Cocteau. It was a great success, and she toured the US in 1956 and 1958.

== Personal life ==
She was married from 1927–42 to fellow Norwegian actor Lasse Segelcke (1898–1942) and from 1945–1959 to surgeon Anton Raabe (1889–1959). During her marriage to Anton Raabe, they bought and restored a number of old houses and buildings: Bjørnsgård on Lake Bogstadvannet in Oslo (1930-1955); Uppigard Streitlien (today Folldal bygdetun) in Folldal from 1942 to 1957; and Huldreheimen in Bykle. From 1959 onwards, she spent many summers in Folldal Municipality.

== Other sources ==
- Segelcke, Tore. Med luft under vingene. Aschehoug, 1959
- Rønneberg, Anton. Skuespillerinnen Tore Segelcke. Aschehoug, 1946
- Jonsmoen, Ola. «Hos Tore Segelcke på Uppigard Streitlien i Folldal» I: Årbok for Glåmdalen 1973
