= Liv (film) =

1967 Norwegian film

- Directed by: Pål Løkkeberg
- Written by: Pål Løkkeberg; Vibeke Løkkeberg; Sverre Udnæs
- Starring: Vibeke Løkkeberg
- Cinematography: Halvor Næss
- Release date: 27 March 1967
- Running time: 88 minutes
- Country: Norway
- Language: Norwegian

Liv is a 1967 Norwegian drama film directed by Pål Løkkeberg. It was entered into the 17th Berlin International Film Festival.

== Cast ==
- Vibeke Løkkeberg as Liv
- Per Theodor Haugen as photographer
- Bente Børsum as Liv's friend
- Geir Børresen as fiancé
- Helen Brinchmann as bride
- Dag Christensen
- Helga Holdhus as the lady in the tobacco business
- Tori Liseth as little girl
- Elsa Lystad as lady in the window
- Lars Nordrum as bride's dress maker
- Henny Skjønberg as old lady
- Hans Stormoen as father
- Rolv Wesenlund as Hermansen
