= Pål Løkkeberg =

Norwegian film director

- Born: 2 August 1934; Norway
- Died: 29 January 1998 (aged 63); Norway
- Occupations: Film director Screenwriter
- Years active: 1962–1990
- Parent: Georg Løkkeberg (father) Rønnaug Alten (mother)
- Relatives: Tore Segelcke (aunt)

Pål Løkkeberg (2 August 1934 – 29 January 1998) was a Norwegian film director and screenwriter. He directed six films between 1962 and 1990. His 1967 film Liv was entered into the 17th Berlin International Film Festival.

He was the son of Norwegian actors Georg Løkkeberg (1909–1986) and Rønnaug Alten (1910 – 2001).

== Selected filmography ==
- 1967: Liv (director and writer)
- 1971: Rødblått paradis as the social work director
