= Ukjent mann =

- Directed by: Astrid Henning-Jensen
- Written by: Astrid Henning-Jensen
- Based on: Arthur Omre's novel Flukten
- Produced by: Ernst Ottersen
- Starring: Alfred Maurstad; Urda Arneberg; Jørn Ording
- Cinematography: Arthur J. Ornitz
- Music by: Gunnar Sønstevold
- Distributed by: Norsk Film A/S
- Release date: November 19, 1951
- Running time: 104 minutes
- Country: Norway
- Language: Norwegian

Ukjent mann (Unknown Man) is a 1951 Norwegian crime film written and directed by Astrid Henning-Jensen. The film is based on Arthur Omre's 1936 novel Flukten. Alfred Maurstad appears in the title role.

The outdoor scenes, which make up approximately 90% of the film, were shot in Åndalsnes, Bergen, and Copenhagen.

== Plot ==
Erik Dahl, who has been convicted of smuggling, escapes from prison and seeks out his wife. She breaks up with him because he does not want to serve his sentence. Dahl still gets to meet his son at the circus the next day, where the police recognize him and he has to flee. Dahl seeks out his old friend, the plumber Jensen, who has kept some money for him. Dahl then manages to flee the city. He tries to change his appearance, dyes his hair and grows a mustache, and travels for a while in the forest. Eventually, he becomes braver, takes a coastal boat, and meets Tone. She gets off in a coastal town, and he follows her. Dahl checks into the local hotel, where he registers as a fishmonger. Soon the whole town believes that he has come there to start a fishing business. Josefsen, who has run such a business before, offers him company membership. The business is going brilliantly, and, when they get an offer to export eels to Denmark, Dahl takes the opportunity. He does this because, among other things, he can obtain a fake passport in Copenhagen. Tone meets him in Copenhagen, where they spend a few lovely days together. They travel home to the coastal town, where the local policeman has discovered that Dahl is wanted. He flees to Bergen to see his son for the last time before he goes abroad, but the police have been keeping an eye on the family the whole time and arrest him.

== Cast ==
- Alfred Maurstad as Erik (Berg) Dahl
- Urda Arneberg as Tone
- Jørn Ording as Josefsen
- Helen Brinchmann as Mona Dahl
- Lulu Ziegler as the cabaret singer
- Preben Neergaard as the waiter
- Lars Henning-Jensen as Knut
