= Fredrik Ording =

Norwegian educator, writer and politician

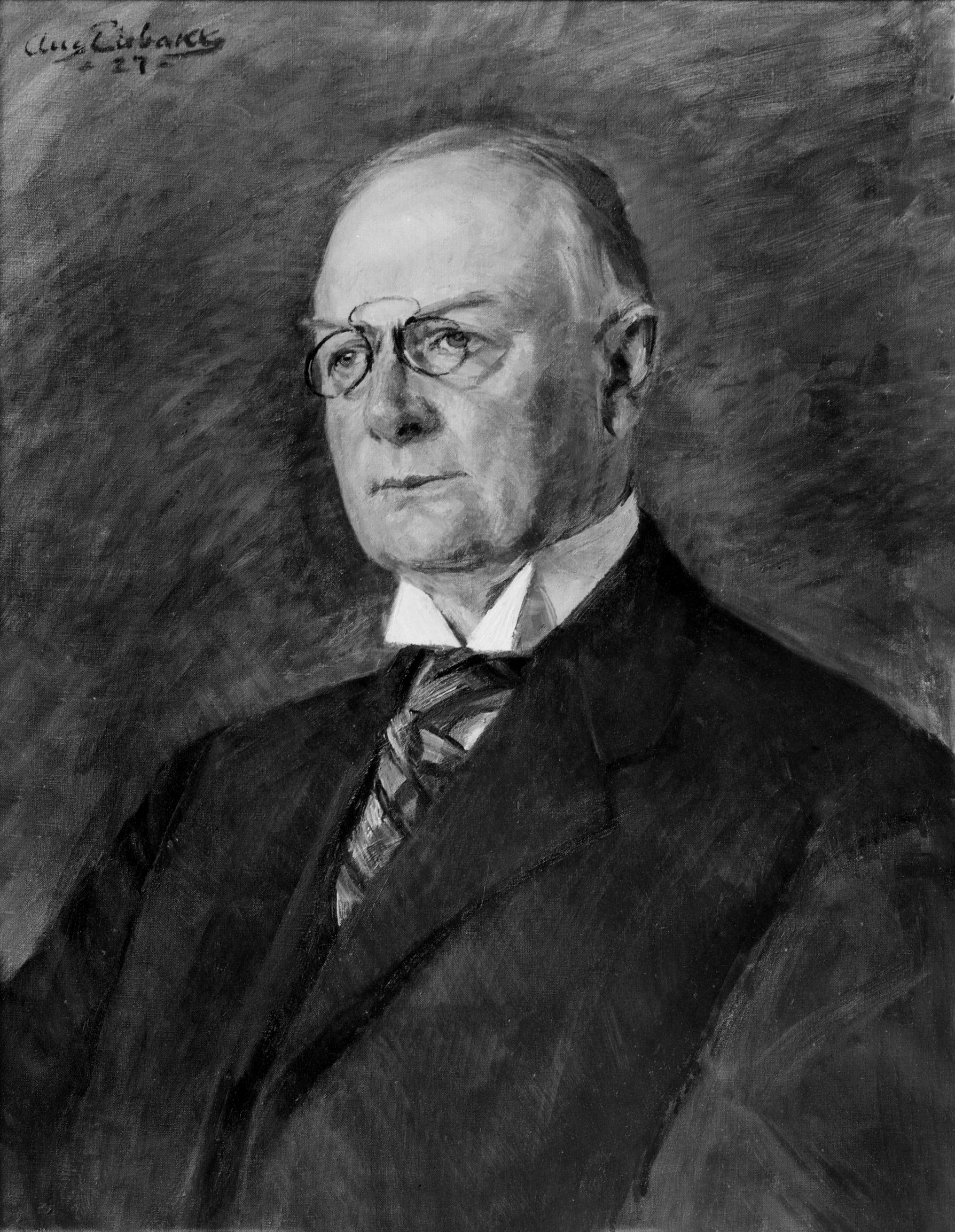
Fredrik Ording

Fredrik Christian Wildhagen Ording (6 April 1870 – 2 February 1929) was a Norwegian educator, writer and politician for the Conservative Party.

== Personal life ==
He was born in Drammen as a son of rector Jørgen Frederik Ording (1832–1888) and Marie Benedicte Wildhagen (1845–1913). He was a brother of theologian Johannes Ording, a first cousin of theologian Hans Nielsen Hauge Ording, an uncle of actor Jørn Ording and historian and politician Arne Ording and a first cousin once removed of politician Aake Anker Ording. He was also a brother-in-law of Harald Wergeland.

== Career ==
He enrolled as a student in 1888, and worked as a teacher at various schools in Kristiania between 1893 and 1901. From 1899 to 1900 he lived in Stockholm, working as a private teacher for Crown Prince Gustaf Adolf of Sweden and Norway. He later tutored Gustaf Adolf in Kristiania, in the springs of 1903 and 1904. He studied in Germany in 1895 and England in 1901, 1905 and 1906. Between 1902 and 1904 he worked at Bjølsen School, Nissen's School and Kristiania Teacher's College. He was the manager of the two latter institutions from 1904 to 1912, and in August 1912 he was hired as acting rector of Holmestrand Teacher's College. Ording was a member of Holmestrand city council from 1916 to 1924, serving as mayor from 1919. During the terms 1922–1924 and 1925–1927 he served as a deputy representative to the Parliament of Norway, representing the constituency Market towns of Vestfold county. He also served on the Parliamentary School Commission of 1922. From 1926 he worked as rector of Drammen School. He died in February 1929.

Ording wrote several books, including Latinsk Elementarbok (1903), Norsk Litteratur (1911), Pædagogikkens historie (1916), Riksarkivar M. Birkeland. Hans liv og virke (1919, a biography of Michael Birkeland) and Det lærde Holland (1927). Some of his academic works were updated and reissued long after his death; Latinsk elementarbok ("Elementary Book of Latin") was reissued as late as 1964, and Pædagogikkens historie ("The History of Pedagogy") was reissued as late as1972, as Pedagogikkens historie with updates by Einar Boyesen and Wilhelm Aarek.
