= Alfred Maurstad =

Norwegian actor and director (1896–1967)

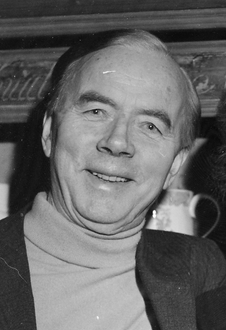
- Born: 26 July 1896
- Died: 5 September 1967 (aged 71)
- Occupation: Actor
- Spouse(s): Tordis Maurstad
- Awards: Knight First Class of the Order of St. Olav

Alfred Jentoft Maurstad (26 July 1896 – 5 September 1967) was a Norwegian actor, movie director and theatre manager.

== Biography ==
Alfred Jentoft Maurstad was born at Bryggja in Davik Municipality (now Stad Municipality) in Sogn og Fjordane, Norway. He was the son of Brynnel Maurstad (1859–1943) and Lovise Marie Brølos (1867–1943). Maurstad attended a military academy in Bergen (Bergenske Brigades Underoffiserskole). During his teenage years he performed in several concerts in the district of Nordfjord, playing on his Hardanger fiddle. He moved to Kristiania and debuted in 1921 at Det Norske Teatret. He began working at the Nationaltheatret in 1930. He was the theatre manager at Trøndelag Theater from 1945 to 1950. Maurstad played main parts in several films including Fant (1937), Gjest Baardsen (1939), Tørres Snørtevold (1940) and Trysil-Knut (1942). He was a member of the Norwegian Association for Women's Rights.

== Personal life ==
He was married twice; first in 1925 to Tordis Elfrida Witzøe (they divorced in 1943) and second in 1956 to Gro Scott-Ruud. His daughter Mari Maurstad (born 1957) and son Toralv Maurstad (born 1926) are both actors. He was also the father-in-law of actress Beate Eriksen, his son's third wife.

== Filmography ==
Actor

- 1926 – Brudeferden i Hardanger
- 1932 – Fantegutten
- 1934 – Liv
- 1935 – Samhold må til
- 1937 – Fant
- 1938 – Vingar kring fyren (in Swedish)
- 1939 – Gjest Baardsen
- 1940 – Bastard
- 1940 – Tørres Snørtevold
- 1941 – Hansen og Hansen
- 1942 – Trysil-Knut
- 1948 – Jørund Smed
- 1951 – Ørnedalen (Valley of the Eagles)
- 1951 – Ukjent mann
- 1958 – Laila (in Swedish and German)
- 1958 – Ut av mørket
- 1960 – Det store varpet

Director

- 1941 – Hansen og Hansen
- 1942 – En herre med bart

Screenwriter

- 1935 – Samhold må til
- 1941 – Hansen og Hansen

Musician

- 1939 – Gjest Baardsen
