= Fridtjof Mjøen =

Norwegian actor and director

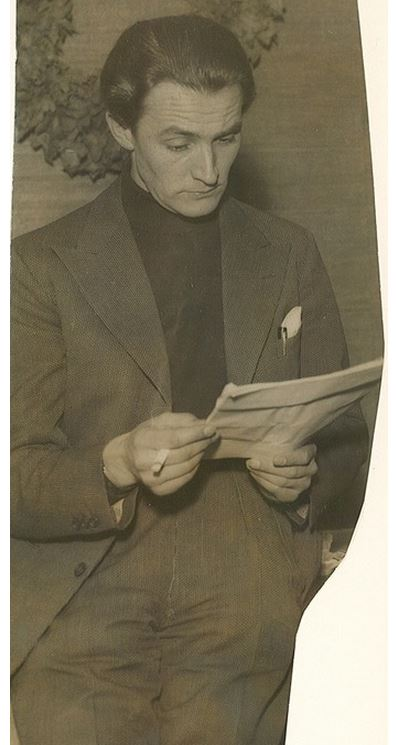
- Born: 3 August 1897
- Died: 21 October 1967 (aged 70)
- Occupations: actor and theatre director

Fridtjof Mjøen (3 August 1897 – 21 October 1967) was a Norwegian actor and theatre director. He made his stage debut at Centralteatret in 1927. He was artistical director at Det Nye Teater from 1936 to 1937. During the 1940s and 1950s he played in various films, and in audio plays at Radioteatret.

== Selected filmography ==
- Snowshoe Bandits (1928)
- The Stars Shine (1938)
- Twelve Minutes After Midnight (1939)
- One, But a Lion! (1940)
- Vigdis (1943)
- I moralens navn (1954)
- The Summer Wind Blows (1955)
- Kvinnens plass (1956)
- Hans Nielsen Hauge (1961)
