= Andreas Hauge =

Norwegian politician (1815–1892)

Andreas Hauge (12 December 1815 – 13 January 1892) was a Norwegian priest, educator, editor and hymn writer. He also served as a representative in the Norwegian Parliament.

== Biography ==
He was born in Aker in Akershus county, Norway. He was the sole surviving son of Lutheran lay minister, Hans Nielsen Hauge (1771–1824) and Andrea Andersdatter Nyhus (1784–1815). He lost his mother at only a week of age. His three siblings all died in infancy. In 1817, his father married Ingeborg Marie Olsdatter (1791–1872) and established residence at the Bredtvet farm in Bjerke. He received private lessons in Latin from the age of seven. His father died when Andreas Hauge was nine years of age and he was raised by his step-mother. His father's many friends took care of his education. In 1829 he started his schooling at Drammen. He took examen artium in 1834 and earned a cand.theol. degree in 1839.

In 1843 he started a private school in Trondhjem together with Olaus Vullum (1812–1852) and Carl P. P. Essendrop (1818– 1893), whom he had met at the university. He worked at another school from 1845. He was also involved in the local missionary movement. He founded the publication Norsk Missionstidende in 1845 and edited it until 1854. He was hired as secretary of the Norwegian Missionary Society in 1850.

Andreas Hauge continued his career as vicar in Nordre Undal Municipality from 1852 and vicar in Skien Municipality from 1857. He was promoted to dean in 1868, and was elected to the municipal council in the same year. Before this he had served one term in the Parliament of Norway, being elected from the constituency Skien in 1865.

Hauge was also a hymn writer. He published Psalmer til Brug ved Missions-Sammenkomster in 1846 and 100 Missions-Psalmer in 1852. In 1863 he published Psalmebog til Kirke- og Huus-Andagt. This became a competitor of sorts of Magnus Brostrup Landstad's hymnals, and was officially released in 1874 as Psalmebog for Kirke og Hus. It was used by congregations until 1941, but Landstad's work prevailed in the long run.

== Personal life ==
In May, 1850 he married Gabrielle Kielland (1830–1911), daughter of priest Gabriel Kirsebom Kielland (1796–1854). Her mother was author Gustava Kielland (1800–1889) who spend some of her later years living together with Hauge and his wife.

They were the parents of a sizable family, Their son Gabriel Kielland Hauge (1857–1940) was an engineer and founder of Strømmen Trævarefabrik AS. Their son Hans Nilsen Hauge (1853–1931) became a priest and politician. Their daughter Johanne Gabrielle Gustava Andrea Hauge (1851–1890) married Theodor Ording (1837–1908) and was the mother of Lutheran theologian Hans Nielsen Hauge Ording (1884–1952).

Hauge was decorated with the Royal Norwegian Order of St. Olav in 1875. He remained dean in Skien until his death in January 1892.

== Related reading ==
- Mons Olson Wee (1919) Haugeanism: A Brief Sketch on the Movement and Some of Its Chief Exponents
