= Axel Thue (actor) =

Norwegian actor

Axel Thue (3 June 1904 – 28 October 1985) was a Norwegian actor.

He was born in Oslo. He made his stage debut at the trial stage of Det Nye Teater and was employed there in 1933. He worked at Trøndelag Teater from 1936 to 1943 and Nationaltheatret from 1945 to 1974.
