= Death Is a Caress =

1949 film

Death is a Caress
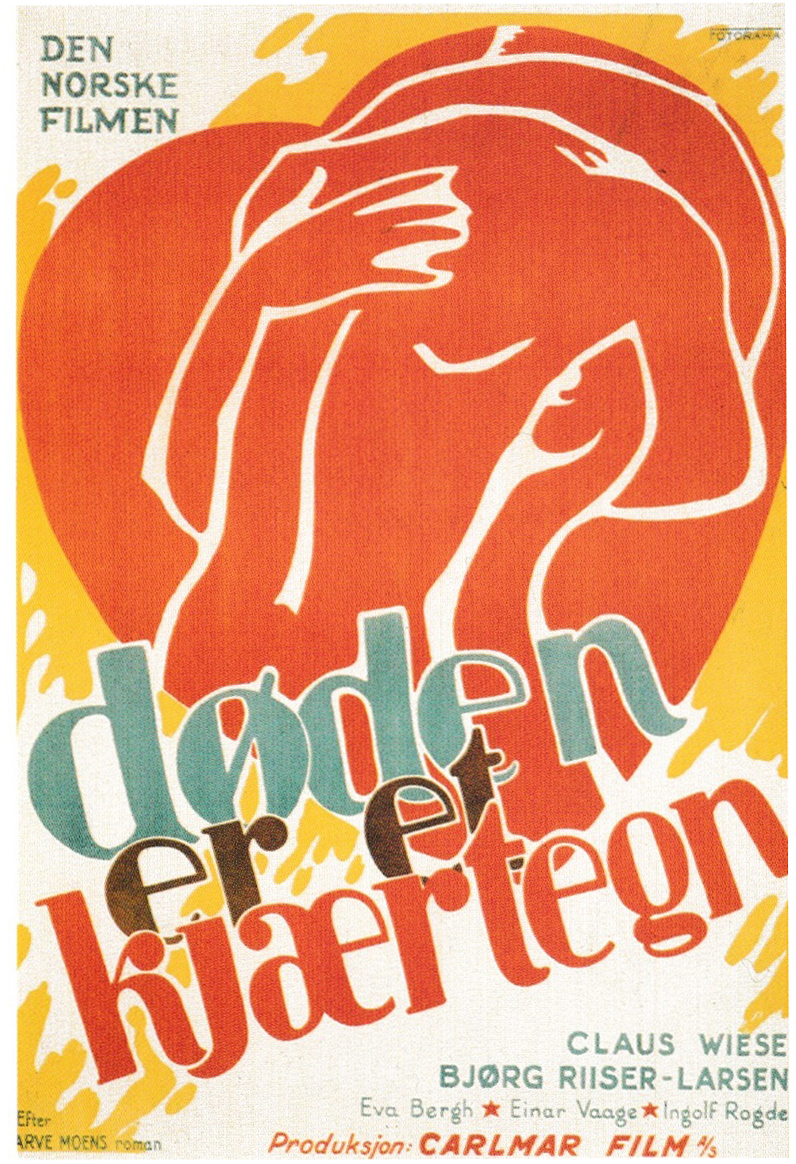
- Directed by: Edith Carlmar
- Written by: Otto Carlmar; Arve Moen (novel)
- Starring: Claus Wiese; Bjørg Riiser-Larsen; Ingolf Rogde; Brita Bigum
- Cinematography: Kåre Bergstrøm; Ragnar Sørensen
- Release date: 1949
- Running time: 92 minutes
- Country: Norway
- Language: Norwegian

Death is a Caress (Norwegian: Døden er et kjærtegn) is a 1949 Norwegian film noir starring Claus Wiese, Bjørg Riiser-Larsen and Ingolf Rogde. Based on a 1948 novel by Arve Moen, it was Edith Carlmar's directorial début, and the first Norwegian film directed by a woman.

The film depicts the passionate and tempestuous liaison between mechanic Erik (Wiese) and society woman Sonja (Riiser-Larsen). The film uses cinematic shorthand to convey time and place, while concentrating on its protagonists' increasingly troubled relationship.
