= Alex Brinchmann =

Norwegian pediatrician and writer (1888–1978)

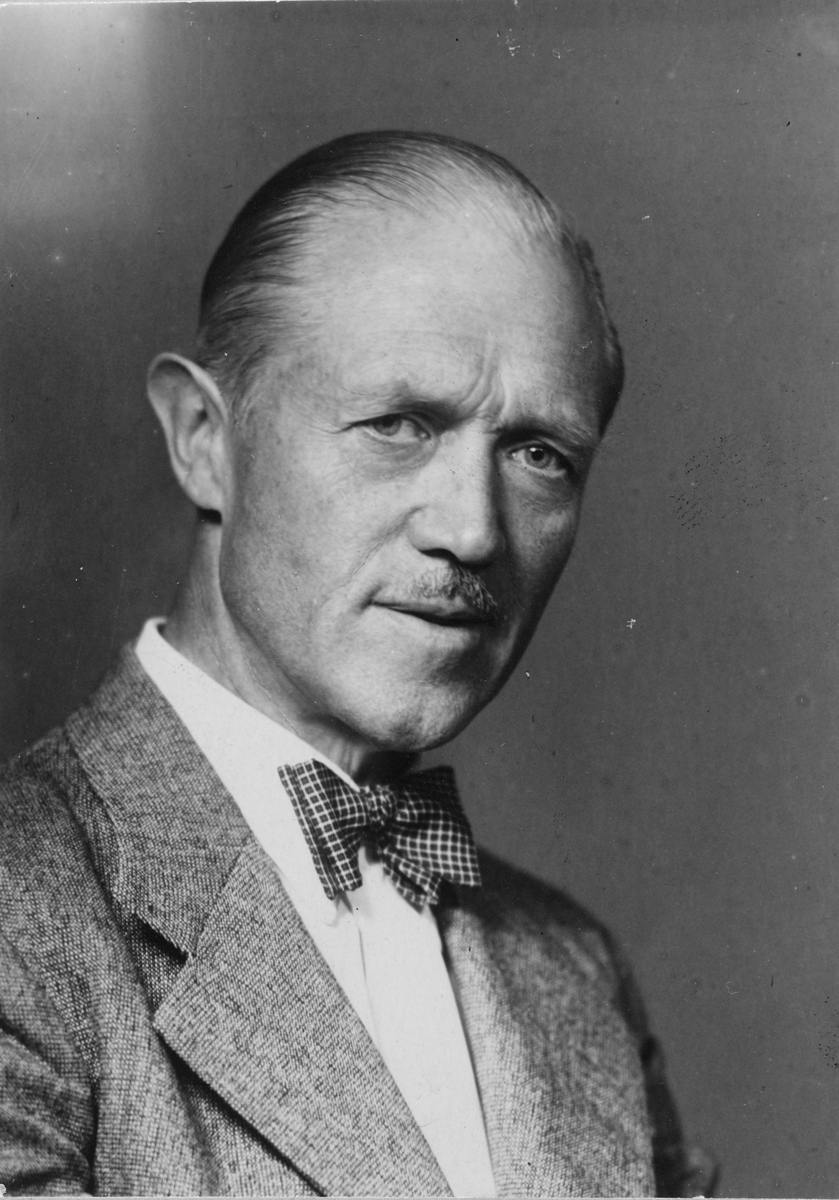
Dr. Alexander Brinchmann (1962)

Alexander Brinchmann (15 June 1888 – 18 April 1978) was a Norwegian pediatrician. He was also a songwriter, novelist, playwright and crime fiction writer. He chaired the Norwegian Pediatric Society from 1933 to 1934 and the Norwegian Authors' Union from 1941 to 1945.

== Personal life ==
Brinchmann was born in Kristiania (now Oslo), Norway. He was the son of rector Jacob Ludvig Hoffmann Brinchmann and Henny Leth. He was married in 1914 to Nina Grønvold (1891–1924), to Johanne Ringberg from 1925, and to Gunvor Næss (1897–1974) from 1944. He was the father of film producer and theatre director Arild Brinchmann.

== Medical career ==
Brinchmann finished his secondary education in 1906. He then studied medicine, graduating as cand.med. in 1912. From 1913 to 1914 he specialized in pediatrics at the Charité Hospital in Berlin. From 1918 until 1971, he worked at Rikshospitalet in Kristiania. He was authorized as a specialist in pediatrics in 1921, and became a medical doctor in 1922. Among his medical writings were articles on children's tuberculosis, and later mental hygiene for children. He was the chairman of the Norwegian Pediatric Society (Barnelegeforeningen) from 1933 to 1934. He received the King's Medal of Merit (Kongens fortjenstmedalje) in gold in 1952.

== Literary career ==
Brinchmann made his literary debut in 1927 with the crime novel Mysteriet Steegener, published under the pseudonym "Roy Roberts". Among his other novels are Deilig er jorden from 1931 and Den rike mann from 1937. His comedy Karusell was staged at Nationaltheatret in 1940, directed by Gerda Ring, with Aase Bye and Per Aabel playing the main characters. The comedy was made into films in both Norway, Sweden and Denmark. Brinchmann chaired the Writers' Guild of Norway from 1938 to 1956. He published the book Norske forfattere i krig og fred. Den Norske forfatterforening 1940–1968 in 1968, in cooperation with Sigurd Evensmo.

He chaired the Norwegian Authors' Union during World War II from 1941 to 1945 . He was a member of the Norwegian Resistance Movement's cultural council from 1943. He was arrested in January 1945 and held at Møllergata 19 and at the Grini concentration camp until 30 April 1945.
