= Georg Løkkeberg =

Norwegian actor (1909–1986)

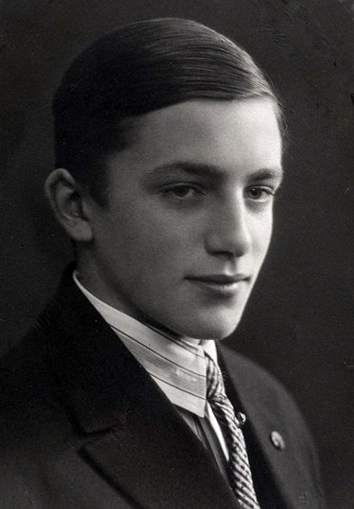
- Born: 20 November 1909; Fredrikstad, Norway
- Died: 19 August 1986 (aged 76); Norway
- Occupation: Actor
- Years active: 1934-1978
- Spouse: Rønnaug Alten (m. 1932; div. 1947)
- Children: Pål Løkkeberg
- Relatives: Tore Segelcke (sister)

Georg Løkkeberg (20 November 1909 – 19 August 1986) was a Norwegian actor and theatre director. He appeared in 29 films between 1934 and 1978. He starred in the film The Master and His Servants, which was entered into the 9th Berlin International Film Festival.

== Family ==
He was born at Fredrikstad in Østfold, Norway to Georg Løkkeberg (1872–1951) and Hulda Marie Hansen (1878–1941). His sister Tore Segelcke (1901–1979) was also an actress.

In 1932, Løkkeberg married the actress Rønnaug Alten (1910–2001). The couple divorced in 1947. The film director and screenwriter Pål Løkkeberg (1934–1998) was their son.

== Selected filmography ==
- Sinners in Summertime (1934)
- Song of Rondane (1934)
- Vi bygger landet (1936)
- By og land hand i hand (1937)
- Mot nya tider (1939)
- Familien på Borgan (1939)
- Whalers (1939)
- Emilie Högquist (1939)
- Bastard (1940)
- The Three of Us (1940)
- Rikard Nordraak (1945)
- Woman in White (1949)
- In the Arms of the Sea (1951)
- House of Women (1953)
- The Master and His Servants (1959)
- Et øye på hver finger (1961)
- Hans Nielsen Hauge (1961)
- De ukjentes marked (1968)
- Autumn Sonata (1978)
