= Rønnaug Alten =

Norwegian actress (1910–2001)

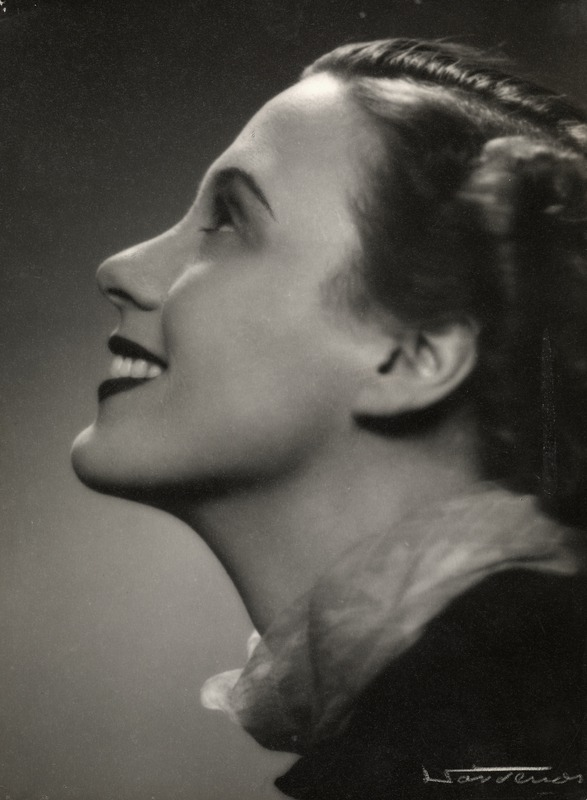
- Rønnaug Alten in 1940
- Born: 9 February 1910; Tromsø, Norway
- Died: 20 January 2001 (aged 90); Oslo, Norway
- Occupation: Actress
- Spouse: Georg Løkkeberg (m. 1932; div. 1947)
- Children: Pål Løkkeberg
- Relatives: Edvin Alten (stepfather); Berit Alten (half-sister)
- Awards: Guldbagge Award for Best Actress in a Leading Role (1982); Order of St. Olav (1982)

Rønnaug Alten (9 February 1910 – 20 January 2001) was a Norwegian actress and stage instructor.

== Biography ==
She was born in Tromsø, Norway. Her parents were Emil Bredenbech Melle (1878–1950) and Ragna Aass (1880–1975). After her parents' divorce in 1913, she was raised by her mother and her stepfather, Supreme Court Justice Edvin Alten (1876–1967). Her half-sister Berit Alten (1915–2002) was married to literary historian Asbjørn Aarnes (1923–2013). She grew up in Kristiania (now Oslo) and attended Frogner School, graduating artium in 1928.

In 1932, she married the actor Georg Løkkeberg (1909–1986). Their marriage was dissolved in 1947. The film director and screenwriter Pål Løkkeberg (1934–1998) was their son.

She made her stage debut at Den Nationale Scene in 1930 as "Viola" in Shakespeare's play Twelfth Night. During her career, she worked for various theatres, including Det Nye Teater (1931–38), Nationaltheatret (1935), Trøndelag Teater (1945–48), Riksteatret (1949–51), Folketeatret (1952–59), Oslo Nye Teater (1959–68) and Teatret Vårt in Molde (1972–74). Her final performance was at the Riksteatret in 1975.

Rønnaug Alten's film career began in 1936 with a role under film director Olav Dalgard. She also translated and organized a series of recordings for NRK. She served as an instructor principally for children's performances. She was a board member of the Norwegian Actors' Equity Association. She was decorated Knight, First Class of the Order of St. Olav in 1982. Also in 1982, she shared the award for Best Actress at the 18th Guldbagge Awards with Sunniva Lindekleiv and Lise Fjeldstad for their roles in Little Ida.
