= Finn Bø =

Norwegian songwriter and playwright

- Born: 4 July 1893; Kristiania, Norway
- Died: 24 April 1962 (aged 68)
- Education: Norwegian Institute of Technology
- Occupations: Journalist, theatre critic, songwriter, revue writer and playwright

Finn Bø (4 July 1893 – 24 April 1962) was a Norwegian songwriter, revue writer, playwright, journalist, instructor and theatre critic.

== Career ==
Bø is particularly remembered for his song "Norge i rødt, hvitt og blått," which became extremely popular in 1945. Among his other popular songs are "Nå går'n på gummisåler" and "Bare rundt omkring", both from 1928. He published the anecdote collection Forbuden frukt in 1945, and the song collection Jeg tar mig den frihet in 1946. Several of his plays were also adapted into films.

== Personal life ==
His parents were Johan Christian Andreas Bø (1850–1924) and Valborg Hansen (1863–1910). He married Alfhild Knagenhjelm Poppe in 1930. He received a degree in chemical engineering from the Norwegian Institute of Technology in 1916, but from 1920 onward he mainly worked as a writer and journalist.

== Selected works ==
=== Plays / revue comedies ===
- Den enes død (sm.m. S. Hoel), 1921
- Du har lovet mig en kone!, 1934 (filmmanus 1935)
- Hele byen snakker, 1936 og 1957
- I moralens navn, 1937
- Det store spørsmål, 1940 (filmmanus En herre med bart, 1942)
- Halmstrået, 1940
- Konge for en natt, 1940 (filmmanus Hansen og Hansen, 1941)
- Trollfossen (filmmanus sm.m. A. Scott-Hansen og S. Hoel), 1948
- To liv, 1946
- Hele byen flagger, 1950
- Se deg om i glede, 1959
- Fordi jeg elsker deg, 1961

=== Song and anecdote collections ===
- Forbuden frukt, 1945
- Jeg tar meg den frihet, 1946
- Ondt ord igjen, 1951
- I Tigerstadens jungel, 1961

=== Discography (selection) ===
- Gamle revyviser (div. artister), 1978
- Lalla Carlsen, 1989
- Einar Rose: Landskampen, 1994
