= Fredrik Lange-Nielsen =

Norwegian mathematician and chief executive

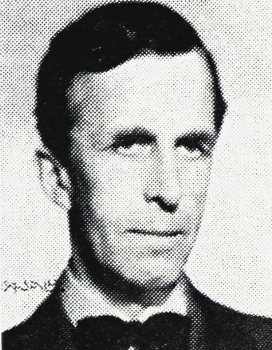
- Born: 13 May 1891; Eivindvik, Norway
- Died: 16 May 1980 (aged 89); Oslo, Norway
- Education: Norwegian Military Academy
- Occupations: Mathematician; Insurance company manager
- Children: Trygve Lange-Nielsen; Mette Lange-Nielsen
- Relatives: Sissel Lange-Nielsen (daughter-in-law); Per Lillo-Stenberg (son-in-law); Lars Lillo-Stenberg (grandson)
- Awards: Grand Cross of Den Gyldne Gris; Knight, First Class of the Order of St. Olav; Knight of the Danish Order of Dannebrog; Knight of the Swedish Order of the Polar Star

Fredrik Lange-Nielsen (13 May 1891 – 16 May 1980) was a Norwegian mathematician and insurance company manager. He chaired the Norwegian Students' Society, edited Norsk matematisk Tidsskrift, and lectured at the University of Oslo. He was chief executive of the insurance company Norske Liv for nearly twenty years, was elected member of several governmental commissions, and a member of the Norwegian Academy for Language and Literature from its establishment in 1953.

== Personal life ==
Lange-Nielsen was born in Eivindvik in Gulen Municipality; the son of physician Johan Fredrik Nielsen and Christine Lange. He married Laura Stang Lund in 1918. He was the father of judge Trygve Lange-Nielsen, and father-in-law of novelist Sissel Lange-Nielsen. He died in Oslo in 1980.

== Career ==
Lange-Nielsen finished his secondary education in 1908, and attended the Norwegian Military Academy in 1909. He actively took part in social academic life. He was among the editors of the Norwegian Students' Society's magazine Samfundsbladet, and he was a board member of the society in the autumn of 1913, at the society's Centennial Anniversary. He chaired the Norwegian Students' Society in 1916. He graduated candidatus realium in 1917, and subsequently studied mathematics in Lund and in Paris.

He was manager of the statistics department of De norske Livsforsikringsselskaper from 1920 to 1938, and edited the journal Norsk matematisk Tidsskrift from 1924 to 1929. He also lectured in mathematical subjects at the University of Oslo. From 1938 to 1945 he worked for the Norwegian Public Service Pension Fund, but was arrested by the Germans in December 1941 because of his participation in the Norwegian resistance movement, and did not return to the Pension Fund until 1945. He was imprisoned at Møllergata 19, and then incarcerated at the Grini concentration camp from January 1942 to May 1943. While at Grini, he took part in what has been described as the first actual political discussions in the camp, along with Erling Bühring-Dehli, Olaf Solumsmoen and others.

From 1945 to 1964 he was chief executive of the insurance company Norske Liv. He was elected to several governmental commissions, including Pensjonslovkomiteen of 1935, Krigpensjoneringsutvalget of 1940, and Livsforsikringskomiteen of 1947. He was among the first members of the Norwegian Academy for Language and Literature from its foundation in 1953. He was awarded the Grand Cross of Den Gyldne Gris, and was decorated as a Knight, First Class of the Order of St. Olav, Knight of the Danish Order of Dannebrog, and Knight of the Swedish Order of the Polar Star.

Cultural offices
Preceded by Wilhelm Christian Keilhau	Chairman of the Norwegian Students' Society; 1916 (spring)	Succeeded by Henning Bødtker
