= Trost i taklampa (film) =

- Directed by: Erik Borge
- Written by: Erik Borge; Odd Bang-Hansen
- Based on: Alf Prøysen's novel Trost i taklampa
- Produced by: Jan Erik Düring
- Starring: Grete Nordrå; Jack Fjeldstad
- Cinematography: Tore Breda Thoresen
- Edited by: Erik Løchen
- Music by: Maj Sønstevold
- Distributed by: ABC-Film
- Release date: January 17, 1955
- Running time: 81 minutes
- Country: Norway
- Language: Norwegian

Trost i taklampa (Blackbird in the Chandelier) is a Norwegian comedy film from 1955 directed by Erik Borge. It is based on Alf Prøysen's 1950 novel Trost i taklampa.

The film stars Grete Nordrå as Gunvor Smikkstugun, along with Jack Fjeldstad and Martin Gisti.

== Cast ==
- Grete Nordrå as Gunvor Smikkstugun
- Martin Gisti as Lundjordet
- William Nyrén as Hjalmar
- Jack Fjeldstad as Brekkestøl
- Roy Bjørnstad as Roy
- Siri Rom as Elise
- Astrid Sommer as Gunvor's mother
- Lillemor Hoel as Eva Snekkersveen
- Pål Bang-Hansen as Arne Barnhemmet
- Randi Nordby as Ingebjørg
- Ragnar Olason as Gunvor's father
- Kristian Løvlie as Oskar
- Ottar Wicklund as Aksel Snekkersveen
- Ada Ørvik as Emma
- Harald Aimarsen as Smikkstad
- Gunda Ullsaker as Mrs. Smikkstad
- Agnes Bjerke as Krestine
- Alf Prøysen as himself
- Anker Wahlstrøm
- Gudmund Blaalid
- Joachim Calmeyer
- Willie Hoel as Teodor Snekkersveen

== Songs ==
- "Trippe-Tripp" (foxtrot) (melody: Maj Sønstevold, lyrics: Alf Prøysen). Issued on 78 rpm (Philips AA 53018-1-H)
- "Blåklokkeleiken" (waltz) (melody: Maj Sønstevold, lyrics: Alf Prøysen). Issued on 78 rpm (Philips AA 53018-2-H)
