= Min Marion =

- Directed by: Nils R. Müller
- Written by: Nils R. Müller
- Based on: Terje Stigen's 1972 novel Min Marion
- Starring: Ulrikke Greve; Sverre Anker Ousdal; Sverre Hansen; Johan Kjelsberg; Mette Lange-Nielsen; Arne Lie; Eli Anne Linnestad; William Nyrén; Siri Rom; Irene Thomsen; Per Tofte; Asbjørn Toms; Ottar Wicklund; Sverre Wilberg; Arne Aas
- Music by: Magne Amdahl
- Distributed by: NRM-film
- Release date: July 28, 1975
- Running time: 106 minutes
- Country: Norway
- Language: Norwegian

Min Marion (My Marion) is a Norwegian drama film from 1975 directed by Nils R. Müller. It is based on Terje Stigen's 1972 novel Min Marion.

== Plot ==
The film tells the story of a love affair between two adults, Marion and Georg. Marion (played by Ulrikke Greve) is disabled and her face has been disfigured since birth. Georg (played by Sverre Anker Ousdal) was disabled as the result of a car accident. The two people of them have experienced good and bad in life and have encountered much resistance. Together they find strength in each other, and the two of them limp along together on their own legs. The film is a sensitive portrayal of a different kind of love story.

== Cast ==
- Ulrikke Greve: Marion
- Sverre Anker Ousdal: Georg
- Sverre Hansen: a supervisor
- Johan Kjelsberg: Hammerstein
- Mette Lange-Nielsen: the landlady
- Arne Lie: the landlord
- Eli Anne Linnestad: Anne-Lise
- William Nyrén: a tenant
- Siri Rom: Marion's mother
- Irene Thomsen: the tenant's wife
- Per Tofte: Aron
- Asbjørn Toms: a farmer
- Ottar Wicklund: Marion's father
- Sverre Wilberg: a photographer
- Arne Aas: Leonid

== Release ==
The film premiered on July 28, 1975. The film was also issued on VHS in the Norske klassikere series in the 1990s, but it was not issued on DVD. Regarding the film, the director, Nils R. Müller, stated that "We all have our handicaps, our burdens, but this does not make it less suitable to love, to love another person."
