= Streik! =

- Directed by: Oddvar Bull Tuhus
- Written by: Lasse Glomm; Oddvar Bull Tuhus
- Based on: Tor Obrestad's novel Sauda! Strike!
- Produced by: Tore Breda Thoresen; Jan Erik Düring
- Starring: Kjell Pettersen; Kjell Stormoen; Thor Inge Kristiansen; Kolbjørn Brenda; Erik Øksnes
- Cinematography: Halvor Næss
- Edited by: Edith Toreg
- Music by: Finn Ludt
- Distributed by: Syncron-film AS
- Release date: February 27, 1975
- Running time: 97 minutes
- Country: Norway
- Language: Norwegian

Streik! is a Norwegian docudrama from 1975, directed by Oddvar Bull Tuhus. The film is loosely based on Tor Obrestad's novel Sauda! Strike!, which is about the Sauda strike in 1970. It was the result of a collaboration between Marcusfilm and NRK's Television Theater. The film shows the event from the workers' point of view. It was staged in cinemas first, and then shown on NRK.

== Cast ==
- Kjell Stormoen as Kåre Sæther
- Kolbjørn Brenda as Knut Martinsen
- Olav Ekholt as Ingolf Gran
- Bjarne Andersen as Petter Åslund
- Eilif Armand as Bjørn Ruud
- Ragnar Baartvedt as the interviewer
- Halvor Elvik as a journalist
- Torgeir Fonnlid as Jens Torgeirson
- Gunnar Garstad as Fjeldstad
- Idar Grøtte as Ole Larsen
- Odd Grøtte as Pedersen
- Berit Guggedal as Mrs. Olsen
- Marit Halset as Mrs. Gran
- Veslemøy Haslund as Brit Fjeld
- Anders Haukeland as Jens Hauge
- Reidun Hjelle as a journalist
- Frank Iversen as Øystein
- Rolf Johansen as Sven Karlsen
- Randi Koch as Eva
- Thor Inge Kristiansen as Svein Hamre
- Ragnhild Michelsen as Johanne Åslund
- Alf Nordvang as Johannes Dalen
- Erik Øksnes as Olav Olsen
- Lars Paulsen as Næss
- Kjell Pettersen as Jan Fjeld
- Einar Ringstrand as Alf Gundersen
- Jan Ringstrand as Anton
- Ola Solum as a journalist
- Bjørg Tvede as Bjørg
- Johannes Westbø as Viik
