= Nannestad (surname) =

Nannestad is a surname. Notable people with the surname include:

- Elizabeth Nannestad (born 1956), New Zealand poet
- Frederik Nannestad (1693–1774), Norwegian theologian, author, and bishop
- Katrina Nannestad, Australian children's writer
- Mathias Bonsach Krogh Nannestad (1815–1878), Norwegian civil servant and politician
- Rolf Nannestad (1887–1969), Norwegian actor
