= Ole Høiland =

Norwegian burglar (1797–1848)

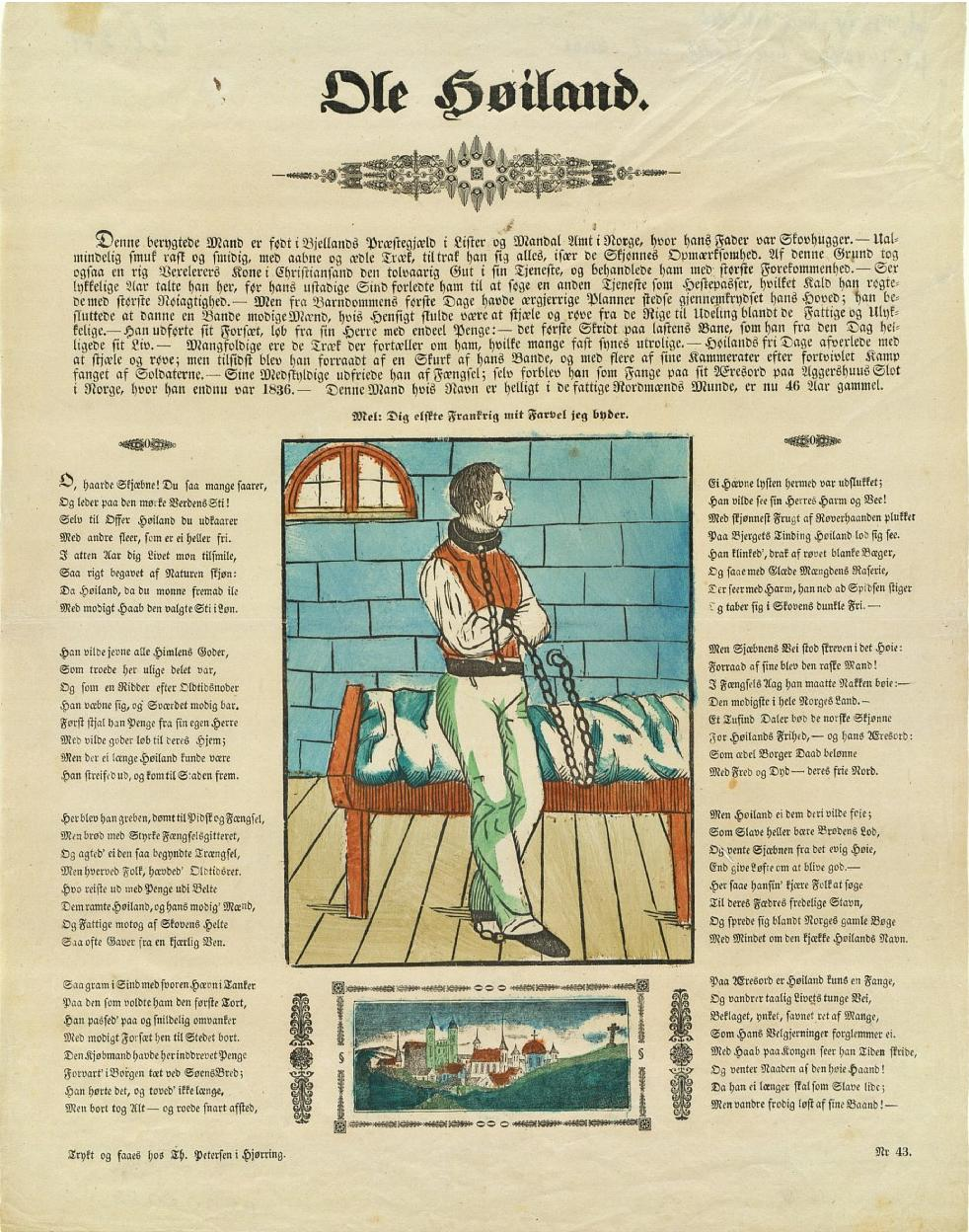
- Trunk illustration featuring Ole Høiland
- Born: c. 1797; Bjelland, Vest-Agder, Norway
- Died: 20 December 1848 (aged 50–51); Christiania
- Occupation: Vagabond

Ole Pedersen Høiland (c. 1797 – 20 December 1848) was a Norwegian burglar and jail-breaker. He was arrested several times for theft; he became legendary for his many successful escapes, and for his spectacular robbery of Norges Bank.

== Personal life ==
Høiland was born in Bjelland in Vest-Agder, the son of farmer Peder Olsen Høiland and Gjertrud Gunlaugsdatter. The family lost their farm after bankruptcy sale, and moved to Kristiansand. Ole worked as a servant on another farm for one year, after which he spent most of his life as a vagabond.

== Criminal life ==
Høiland operated as a thief in the south-western part of Norway. He was arrested and punished physically by slave labour and whipping. While imprisoned, he managed to escape from prison eleven times. His spectacular robbery of the Christiania department of Norges Bank in 1835 earned him the amount of 64,000 speciedaler. He was arrested seven weeks later, and imprisoned at the Akershus Prison. After four years he escaped from Akershus, and managed to stay on the run for three years. He was eventually arrested for the last time in 1842, and was extraordinarily heavily guarded during his subsequent imprisonment at Akershus. He ended his life by committing suicide in Akershus in 1848.

== Legacy ==
Poet Henrik Wergeland wrote two songs about Høiland, the first "Ny Vise om Ole Pedersen Høilands sidste mærkelige Undvigelse fra Agerhuus Fæstning Natten til den 17de September 1839", and another song after his final arrest in 1842. His fellow prisoner Gjest Baardsen wrote a memorial song after Høiland's death, titled "Ole Høilands død". A biography of Høiland was printed in Christiania-Posten in 1849, and Jacob Breda Bull wrote about him in 1910. His life was basis for the film Ballad of the Masterthief Ole Hoiland from 1970, directed by Knut Andersen, where Per Jansen played the title character.
