= Solfrid Heier =

Norwegian actress and singer (born 1945)

- Born: September 20, 1945 (age 79); Norway
- Occupation: Actress

Solfrid "Winnie" Heier (born September 20, 1945) is a Norwegian actress and singer. She has appeared in film and television roles.

Heier has appeared in the films Skjær i sjøen, Balladen om mestertyven Ole Høiland, Olsenbanden – Operasjon Egon, Krigerens hjerte, and Ute av drift! She made her stage debut at age 17 in Peder Wright Cappelen's play Dikter i ulvepels at the Oslo new Theater, and since then she has also played at the National Traveling Theater, Trøndelag Theater, Chateau Neuf, and Stockholm City Theatre, and she has also had guest roles in TV series such as Karl & Co, Hotel Cæsar, and Mot i brøstet.

She made her recording debut in the mid-1960s under the artist's name Winnie. In 1967 she won third place in the Norwegian Melodi Grand Prix together with Toril Støa with the song "Skitur." Heier was also a recording artist in Sweden.

In 2007, she was the only actress in the play The Alchemist (Norwegian title: Alkymisten), based on the novel by Paulo Coelho, among other plays at the Christiania Theater.

== Filmography ==
- 1965: Skjær i sjøen as Lone
- 1968: Sus og dus på by'n as Olga
- 1969: Olsen-Banden as Ulla, Benny's fiancée
- 1969: Brent jord as Herdis
- 1970: Balladen om mestertyven Ole Høiland as the Gypsy girl
- 1974: Under en steinhimmel as Martha
- 1992: Krigerens hjerte as Mrs. Simmonaes
- 1994: Ute av drift! as Jorunn Verde
- 2005: Olsenbanden jr. på Cirkus as Mrs. Flamingo

== Discography ==
- 1965: "Tänk om han säger nej" / "Usla karl" (Karusell KFF 625)
