= Siri Rom =

Norwegian actress

- Born: March 17, 1918; Kristiania (now Oslo), Norway
- Died: November 13, 2002 (aged 84); Oslo, Norway
- Resting place: Vestre Gravlund
- Occupation: Actress
- Spouse: Ingolf Rogde

Siri Rom (March 17, 1918 – November 13, 2002) was a Norwegian actress. She was engaged for many years at the Norwegian Theater.

== Theater ==
Rom debuted at the Falkberget Theater before she was employed at the Trøndelag Theater from 1940 to 1943, at the Oslo New Theater from 1944 to 1945, and from 1946 onward at the Norwegian Theater. On stage, she played roles such as Hedvig in The Wild Duck, Gunvor in Alf Prøysen's Trost i taklampa (1952), Yvonne in Bertolt Brecht's Mother Courage and Her Children (1955), and Nola in William Inge's Come Back, Little Sheba, and she also appeared in Arthur Miller's A View from the Bridge and Finn Carling's Gitrene. In the 1980s, she had roles as Herlofs-Marte in Hans Wiers-Jenssen's Anne Pedersdotter and Hønse-Lovisa in Oskar Braaten's Ungen. She was also engaged in some directing for the theater.

== Filmography ==
- 1945: Rikard Nordraak as Marie Lund
- 1951: Kranes konditori as Miss Larsen
- 1955: Trost i taklampa as Elise
- 1956: Kvinnens plass as a waitress
- 1962: Reve-enka as Gurine
- 1964: Nydelige nelliker as Mrs. Thorvaldsen
- 1968: De ukjentes marked
- 1968: Sus og dus på by'n as Mrs. Kreim
- 1973: Blokk 12, Oppgang C (TV) as Marta
- 1974: Bør Børson Jr. as Torsøia
- 1975: Min Marion as Marion's mother
- 1976: Bør Børson 2 as Torsøia
- 1979: Lucie as the midwife
- 1993: Secondløitnanten (The Last Lieutenant) as Rønnaug
