= Sus og dus på by'n =

- Directed by: Knut Andersen; Knut Bohwim; Mattis Mathiesen
- Written by: Knut Andersen; Knut Bohwim; Mattis Mathiesen
- Based on: Egil Lian's 1965 novel Sus og dus på by'n
- Produced by: Alan Ousbey
- Starring: Arve Opsahl; Carsten Byhring; Aud Schønemann
- Cinematography: Mattis Mathiesen; Hans Nord
- Music by: Egil Monn-Iversen
- Distributed by: Teamfilm
- Release date: August 12, 1968
- Running time: 75 minutes
- Country: Norway
- Language: Norwegian

Sus og dus på by'n (Carefree in the City) is a Norwegian comedy film in three episodes from 1968. It stars Arve Opsahl, Carsten Byhring, and Aud Schønemann. The film consists of three sequences, directed by Knut Andersen, Knut Bohwim, and Mattis Mathiesen, respectively.

It is one of many films based on books by the writer Egil Lian. His novel Sus og dus på by'n was published by Cappelen in 1965.

== Directors of individual sequences ==
- Knut Andersen: Oss rosemalere imellom (Among Us Rosemaling Painters)
- Knut Bohwim: Fyrstens testamente (The Prince's Will)
- Mattis Mathiesen: Det private initiativ (The Private Initiative)

== Plot ==
The main characters in the story are Slegga, Reven, and Nelly. Slegga (Sledgehammer) is big and strong, kind, and maybe a little stupid. Reven (the Fox) is a completely different type. He is smart and a driven petty criminal. Nelly is also on the wrong side of the law, but her heart is in the right place. The trio go in and out of prison, but they find each other when they are all at large. The film's three sequences portray the jailbirds' activities and circle of friends in Oslo's underworld.

== Cast ==
- Carsten Byhring as Reven
- Arve Opsahl as Slegga
- Aud Schønemann as Nelly
- Kaare Gundersen as a policeman
- Henry R. Hagerup as a scrap dealer
- Per Hagerup as a policeman
- Alf Hallgren as a policeman
- Solfrid Heier as Olga
- Sverre Holm as a policeman
- Ola Isene as a whimsical character with a wild duck in the attic
- Willy Kreim as a policeman
- Bernt Lindekleiv
- Rolf Nannestad as an attic tenant
- Jan Pande-Rolfsen as a policeman
- Siri Rom as Mrs. Kreim
- Anders Sundby as a policeman
- Ottar Wicklund as a policeman
- Sverre Wilberg as the car dealer
