= Remlov =

Remlov is a surname. Notable people with the surname include:

- Kai Remlov, Norwegian actor
- Tom Remlov, Norwegian actor, dramaturg, film producer, theatre director and opera manager
