= Marit Halset =

Norwegian actress (1912–1986)

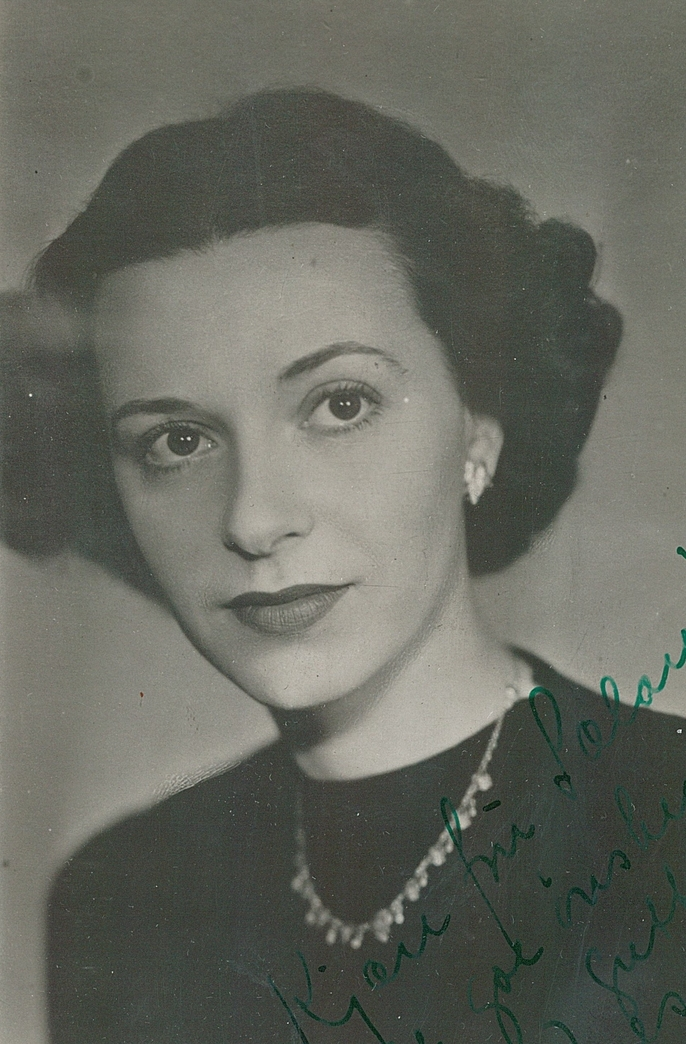
- Marit Halset in the 1950s
- Born: May 18, 1912; Kristiania (now Oslo), Norway
- Died: March 22, 1986 (aged 73)
- Resting place: Vestre gravlund
- Occupation: Actress

Marit Halset (May 18, 1912 – March 22, 1986) was a Norwegian actress. She performed roles in theater, radio theater, and film.

Halset was engaged with the National Theater in Oslo from 1933 to 1948. She debuted as the young girl Hazel Niles in Eugene O'Neill's play Mourning Becomes Electra in the spring of 1933. There she performed together with Johanne Dybwad, August Oddvar, and Ingolf Schanche. Later, she performed significant roles as sensitive young girls, and she ended her time at the National Theater by playing Leonora in Ludvig Holberg's The Fidget in 1948. In 1948 she moved to the New Theater, where she remained until 1967.

Halset also performed regularly in NRK's Radio Theater and Television Theater, in addition to having a number of film roles. Among her films, Kranes konditori and Broder Gabrielsen are the best known.

== Filmography ==
- 1937: Fant as Halvor's wife
- 1948: Trollfossen as Miss Arneberg
- 1951: Kranes konditori as Mrs. Settem
- 1953: Ingen mans kvinna as Åse
- 1954: Portrettet
- 1958: Ut av mørket as Doctor Krag
- 1966: Broder Gabrielsen as the committee chair
- 1968: De ukjentes marked
- 1974: Sommerfuglene as Mrs. Zimmler
- 1975: Streik! as Mrs. Gran
- 1977: Solospill as Asplund's secretary
- 1980: Liv og død as Mrs. Johansen
- 1980: Arme, syndige menneske as Erik's mother
- 1981: Saken Ruth Vang (TV) as the head nurse
- 1992: Tryggere kan ingen være (TV, episode of Fleksnes Fataliteter) as an elderly lady in the congregation
