= Skjær i sjøen =

- Directed by: Knut Andersen
- Written by: Tancred Ibsen
- Based on: Arthur Omre's short story "Sensommer"
- Produced by: Knut Bohwim
- Starring: Henki Kolstad; Tone Danielsen; Solfrid Heier; Wenche Sandnæs
- Cinematography: Mattis Mathiesen
- Edited by: Knut Andersen
- Music by: Egil Monn-Iversen
- Distributed by: Teamfilm
- Release date: December 26, 1965
- Running time: 96 minutes
- Country: Norway
- Language: Norwegian

Skjær i sjøen (Obstacles) is a Norwegian romantic drama film from 1965 directed by Knut Andersen. The film is about an aging author that has retired to a deserted place in Southern Norway. He is divorced and burdened by his own problems. When his cheerful teenage daughter and two of her friends come to visit, the spark gradually returns to his life. The main roles are played by Henki Kolstad, Tone Danielsen, Solfrid Heier, and Kai Remlov. It is based on Arthur Omre's short story "Sensommer" (Indian Summer).

== Plot ==
The aging and divorced author Johannes Mørk relives youth's intoxicating infatuation when his teenage daughter Eva, together with two young friends, sweeps into his lazy southern idyll. Mørk has long revolved around his own problems and guilt over his failed marriage. He has unconsciously been about to stagnate into a dull habit and just let old age come. Lone, one of his daughter's girlfriends, makes a strong impression on him, and soon something begins to develop between them. Both the eccentric and the dour person in him have begun to stand out, but with his daughter's girlfriend in his focus, new feelings awaken in Johannes Mørk. This awakening leads him to resume his relationship with his ex-wife. This also affects his daughter Eva, who has been afraid to commit because she is the child of a divorce.

== Music ==
- "Åh – for en dag!" (melody: Egil Monn-Iversen, lyrics: Bjørn Sand), released as the single Nor-Disc NOR 118 by Winnie (Solfrid Heier) and others in 1965
- "Minnene fra i fjor" (melody: Egil Monn-Iversen, lyrics: Knut Andersen and Bjørn Sand), released on the same single as above
- "Sjøen har mange skjær" (melody: Egil Monn-Iversen, lyrics: Bjørn Sand).
- "De evige tre" (melody: Walter Schrøder, lyrics: Tove Ditlevsen)

== Cast ==
- Henki Kolstad as Johannes Mørk, an author
- Tone Danielsen as Eva Mørk, Johannes' daughter
- Solfrid Heier as Lone
- Wenche Sandnæs as Marit
- Kai Remlov as Carsten, Eva's boyfriend
- Carl Henrik Størmer as Einar, Lone's boyfriend
- John Andreassen as Kalle, Marit's boyfriend
- Synnøve Gleditsch as Mrs. Ås, Marit's mother
- Kjell Hofstad as the mailman
