= Hjem til jul =

Hjem til jul may refer to:

- Hjem til jul (2010 film), a Norwegian film
- Hjem til jul (TV series), a 2019 Norwegian TV series
