= Ottar Wicklund =

Norwegian actor

Ottar Wicklund (3 July 1911 – 13 March 1978) was a Norwegian actor. He made his debut in the film Sangen om Rondane. He was in over 20 Norwegian films and had his last role in the film Min Marion in (1975). He also had many roles in Radioteatret.

== Filmography ==
Year	Title	Role	Notes
1934	Song of Rondane	Hans, Knuts bror	
1936	Norge for folket		
1938	Eli Sjursdotter	Tor Nordlien	
1941	Gullfjellet	Nils Røst	
1951	Dei svarte hestane	Bjørnskinn	
1952	Nødlanding	Tysk underoffiser	
1952	Andrine og Kjell	En lærer	
1953	Skøytekongen		
1953	Selkvinnen	Olav Verdur	
1955	Trost i taklampa	Aksel Snekkersveen	
1957	Cirkus Fandango	Alfred	
1955	Trost i taklampa	Aksel Snekkersveen	
1957	Nine Lives	Henrik	
1958	Høysommer		
1961	Det store varpet		
1963	Freske fraspark	Bjønn-Rudolf	
1965	De Kalte ham Skarven	Herr Fossum	
1966	Hurra for Andersens!	Lysverkmannen	
1968	Sus og dus på by'n	Politimann	
1968	Smuglere		
1968	De ukjentes marked		
1970	Balladen om mestertyven Ole Høiland	Husmannen	
1974	Fleksnes	Pasient på helseklinikken	Episode: "Biovita Helsesenter"
1975	Min Marion	Far til Marion	
