= De ukjentes marked =

- Directed by: Nils R. Müller
- Written by: Nils R. Müller
- Based on: Åge Rønning's novel De ukjentes marked (1966)
- Produced by: Jan Erik Düring
- Starring: Jon Eikemo; Georg Løkkeberg; Leif Enger; Unni Evjen; Marit Halset; Trulte Heide Steen; Egil Hjorth-Jenssen
- Cinematography: Ragnar Sørensen
- Edited by: Nils R. Müller
- Distributed by: NRM-Film AS
- Release date: November 7, 1968
- Running time: 91 minutes
- Country: Norway
- Language: Norwegian

De ukjentes marked (The Market of the Outcasts) is a Norwegian film from 1968. It was directed by Nils R. Müller, who also wrote the screenplay and edited the film. The film is based on Åge Rønning's 1966 novel De ukjentes marked. The film premiered on November 7, 1968, at cinemas in Oslo, Kristiansand, Tønsberg, Drammen, and Ski.

== Plot ==
Star journalist William Klement's career is struggling, and he needs a scoop to make a comeback. One day he comes across an elderly asthmatic outcast called Glassblåser'n (the Glassblower). He is an eternal outcast that has lost his name on the path of life, but who still has his imagination, disrespectful irony, and heart intact, despite his atherosclerosis and asthma. The life of an outcast is not the subject matter for this tough journalist, who has seen most of this world's hypocrisy and ugliness, but he feels sorry for Glassblåser'n and wants to help him. But then he meets Glassblåser's friends. They are outcasts too, a number of different types, and among them is also Ganard. He is an idealist, from countries further south, where he was inspired by Abbé Pierre, a leading figure in working with the outcasts of society. He has teamed up with them to help them help each other. Ganard has come to Oslo to make the same effort there, to gather outcasts and set them in motion by setting up a flea market to raise money for those that are even worse off: the very poorest of the helpless in Lima, Peru. It is in this environment that Klement has now ended up, while the outcasts are in the middle of setting things up. Klement is a man with life experience, and he no longer believes in the beautiful tale of the lame helping the blind. But this is material to work with. And then Klement is captured by the idea. The market itself was a great success. The amount that came in and was to be sent in full to the stranger's unknown comrades in Lima was astonishingly large. However, a few hours after the market ended and the money was counted, it disappeared. Someone had stuffed it into his own pocket. The editorial secretary dismissively said to Klement: "I didn't believe it! A dingy little scam!" But Abbé Pierre had also said to Ganard: "There will sooner or later come a day when everything is destroyed, stained, betrayed, shattered. If you're there the next day, you're in it. Then you are accepted. That's the secret." But this strange episode had another twist in store, to the surprise of Klement, the editorial secretary, and perhaps the outcasts as well.

== Cast ==
- Georg Løkkeberg as William Klement
- Egil Hjorth-Jenssen as Glassblåser'n
- Jon Eikemo as Ganard
- Leif Enger as Laseth
- Rolf Nannestad as Skakkhode
- William Nyrén as Nytorvet
- Rolf Sand as Westlund
- Gisle Straume as Aaman
- Tom Tellefsen as Broker
- Svein Wickstrøm as David
- Unni Evjen
- Marit Halset
- Tom Klausen
- Alfred Solaas
- Trulte Heide Steen
- Sossen Krohg
- Elsa Lystad
- Ottar Wicklund
- Lasse Tomter
- Sonja Mjøen
- Jon Lennart Mjøen
- Siri Rom
- Sverre Wilberg
