= Obrestad (surname) =

Obrestad is a Norwegian surname. Notable people with the surname include:

- Annette Obrestad (born 1988), Norwegian YouTuber and poker player
- Tor Obrestad (1938–2020), Norwegian novelist, poet, and documentary writer
