= Ola Isene =

Norwegian baritone opera singer and actor (1898–1973)

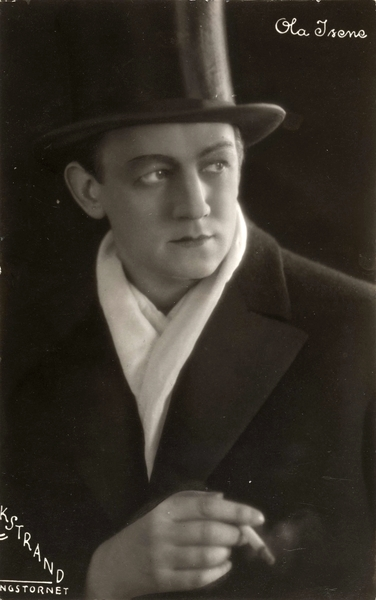
Ola Isene, c. 1935

Ola Isene (2 June 1898 – 6 May 1973) was a Norwegian opera singer (baritone) and actor.

Isene was born in Rødenes and studied at the Musikkonservatoriet in Kristiania. He made his professional debut at the Mayol-teatret in 1923. His operatic roles were varied, among them Beckmesser in Die Meistersinger von Nürnberg, Scarpia in Tosca, and Amonasro in Aïda – most of them at the Nationaltheatret, which at the time had opera on its programme. He took part in many tours and also appeared in operettas, including as Schubert in Jomfruburet. In 1929, he sang Al Jolson's parts from The Jazz Singer when it was presented as a silent film in Sweden, and in the middle of the 1930s, he moved to theatre and film as an actor.

Isene also played the title role in the three criminal radio plays Inspektør Scott på farten by John P. Wynn, which were broadcast by Norwegian Broadcasting Corporation radio in 1960 and 1961.

Ola Isene was from 1926 married to the singer and voice teacher Haldis Ingebjart Isene (1891–1978). His brother Torbjørn was a great-grandfather to discus thrower Ola Stunes Isene.

== Filmography ==
- 1931: Kärlek och landstorm (Swedish)
- 1932: The Southsiders (Swedish)
- 1940: Tørres Snørtevold
- 1942: Trysil-Knut
- 1946: Englandsfarere
- 1946: Så møtes vi imorgen
- 1946: Vi vil leve
- 1948: Den hemmelighetsfulle leiligheten
- 1948: Trollfossen
- 1952: Andrine og Kjell
- 1955: Blodveien
- 1957: Peter van Heeren
- 1958: Høysommer
- 1958: Ut av mørket
- 1960: Struggle for Eagle Peak
- 1960: Veien tilbake
- 1961: Hans Nielsen Hauge
- 1963: Vildanden
- 1964: Nydelige nelliker
- 1964: Alle tiders kupp
- 1965: Skjær i sjøen
- 1968: Sus og dus på by'n
- 1970: Balladen om mestertyven Ole Høiland
- 1970: Olsenbanden og Dynamitt-Harry
- 1973: Knut Formos siste jakt

== Sources ==
- Hoemsnes, Tone, Ola Isene, Store Norsk Lekskicon (in Norwegian)
