= Trost i taklampa =

1950 novel by Alf Prøysen

Trost i taklampa is a 1950 novel by Alf Prøysen, published by Tiden Norsk Forlag.

Its theme and message is an attack on the Law of Jante and a defence of young people who moved from rural Norway.

It was made into a screenplay in 1952, into the film Trost i taklampa in 1955 with Erik Borge as director, and into a musical by Finn Ludt in 1963.

Arbeiderbladet's critic Arve Moen praised its satire and humour as well as the characterization, calling the novel "mana in the desert".
