= Unni Evjen =

Norwegian actress (1943–2019)

- Born: August 3, 1943; Kirkenes, Norway
- Died: September 27, 2019 (aged 76)
- Occupation: Actress

Unni Evjen (August 3, 1943 – September 27, 2019) was a Norwegian actress.

Evjen received her education at the National Academy of Theatre and made her debut at the Oslo New Theater in 1965 in Anne-Catharina Vestly's children's comedy Ut av trolldommen. She had a breakthrough at the Norwegian Theater in 1968 as Hedvig in The Wild Duck. From 1970 to 1974, she was one of NRK Television Theatre's most prominent young performers. From 1974 to 2010 she was employed at the Oslo New Theater, where she had several major roles.

Evjen was also engaged with the Norwegian National Traveling Theater, where among other performances she played the title role in the stage adaptation of Knut Hamsun's Victoria. She also appeared in many television productions, among which she played Rosa in Benoni og Rosa.

== Filmography ==
- 1968: De ukjentes marked
- 1968: Hennes meget kongelige høyhet as Julie, Georg's girlfriend
- 1968: Smuglere as Klara
- 1971: Herr Print oppdager seg selv (1971) as Janine
- 1971: Mooney og campingvognene (TV) as Mave
- 1971: Samfunnets støtter (TV) as Dina Dorf
- 1971: Smilet (TV) as Her
- 1972: En folkefiende (TV) as Petra
- 1972: Fru Warrens virksomhet (TV) as Vivie Warren
- 1972: Yerma (TV) as Maria
- 1973: Aksel og Marit (TV) as Anne, a waitress
- 1973: Kirsebærhaven (TV) as Dunjasja
- 1973: Benoni og Rosa (TV) as Rosa
- 1975: Bydelen som ikke vil dø (TV)
- 1975: Svigerdottera (TV) as Minnie
- 1979: Lucie as Mrs. Mørk
- 1981: Martin as Kjersti Horn
- 1985: Du kan da ikke bare gå as Johan's mother
- 1989: Maria er så liten (TV) as Inger
- 2014: Fargene Forsvant (short) as Ingeborg
