= Per Jansen =

Norwegian actor (1941–2022)

- Born: Per Johan Jansen; 14 December 1941; Bergen, Norway
- Died: 8 August 2022 (aged 80)
- Occupation: Actor
- Years active: 1966–2022

Per Johan Jansen (14 December 1941 – 8 August 2022) was a Norwegian stage and film actor.

== Life and career ==
Jansen was born in Bergen on 14 December 1941. He made his stage debut at Det Norske Teatret in 1966. He later had assignments at Oslo Nye Teater, Riksteatret, Hålogaland Teater, Trøndelag Teater, Nationaltheatret and Fjernsynsteatret. He played the title character in the film Ballad of the Masterthief Ole Hoiland from 1970, and the main character in the films A Commuter Kind of Love from 1979 and Hud from 1986. Jansen died on 8 August 2022, at the age of 80.
