= Scorched Earth (1969 film) =

1969 film

- Directed by: Knut Andersen
- Written by: Sigbjørn Hølmebakk
- Starring: Rolf Søder
- Cinematography: Mattis Mathiesen
- Release date: 24 February 1969
- Running time: 101 minutes
- Country: Norway
- Language: Norwegian

Scorched Earth (Norwegian: Brent jord) is a 1969 Norwegian drama film directed by Knut Andersen. It was entered into the 6th Moscow International Film Festival where it won a diploma.

== Cast ==
- Rolf Søder as Hekki Haldonen
- Anne-Lise Tangstad as Alma, Heikkis kone
- Kåre Tannvik as Ivar
- Tove Andreassen as Anne
- Brith Henriksen as Lilly
- Bonne Gauguin as Bestemoren
- Solfrid Heier as Herdis
- Arne Lindtner Næss as Ilja
- Reiner Brönneke as Offiseren
- Bernt Erik Larssen as Adjutanten
- Dagmar Myhrvold as Herdis' bestemor
- Egil Hjorth-Jenssen as Herdis' bestefar
