= Terje Stigen =

Norwegian author

Terje Stigen (28 June 1922 – 14 August 2010) was a Norwegian author.

== Biography ==
Terje Stigen was born on Magerøya in Finnmark, Norway. He spent part of his childhood in Tromsø. After his final exams at Nordstrand school in Aker during 1941, he studied philology at the University of Oslo, graduating cand.philol. English major in 1947.

He wrote 44 novels and short story collections, almost a new year, besides radio plays and numerous articles. Besides novels and short story collections, he wrote a series of radio plays for Radioteatret. Stigen debuted as an author in 1950 with publication of his novel To døgn. He wrote numerous books, mostly novels, but also a number of lectures and radio dramas. He wrote in Bokmål, the more common of the two Norwegian languages. He was a member of the Norwegian Academy for Language and Literature.

Terje Stigen received the Gyldendal's Endowment (Gyldendalprisen) in 1954, the Riksmål Society Literature Prize (Riksmålsprisen) in 1957 and the Norwegian Booksellers' Prize (Bokhandlerprisen) in 1963.

== Bibliography ==
=== Novels ===
- 1950 To døgn
- 1952 Skygger på mitt hjerte
- 1953 Nøkkel til ukjent rom
- 1954 Før solnedgang
- 1956 Vindstille underveis
- 1957 Frode budbæreren
- 1958 Åsmund Armodsons saga
- 1959 Stjerneøy
- 1960 Elskere
- 1962 Kjærlighet
- 1964 Til ytterste skjær
- 1965 Krystallstjernen
- 1966 Timer i grenseland
- 1967 Det flyktige hjerte
- 1968 De tente lys
- 1969 Det siste paradiset
- 1970 Besettelse
- 1971 Kains merke
- 1972 Min Marion
- 1973 Skumsøylene
- 1975 Peter Johannes Lookhas
- 1975 De faste lys
- 1976 Forliset
- 1977 Avikfjord
- 1978 Huset og byen
- 1979 Rekviem over en sommer
- 1980 Øgler i Avikfjord
- 1981 Blindgjengeren
- 1983 Bak våre masker
- 1984 Baldershavn
- 1986 Ved foten av kunnskapens tre
- 1987 Katedralen
- 1989 Krigen
- 1988 Monolitten
- 1990 Treskjæreren Johannes
- 1991 Fyrholmen
- 1995 Allegretto
- 1996 Alt er slik det er

=== Other publications ===
- 1953 Vindstille underveis, short story cycle
- 1953 Norge, text by Terje Stigen, 28 color photographs and 40 black-and-white photos by Bert Boger (Dreyer, Oslo)
- 1963 Glasskulen, novella collection
- 1972 Norsk rapsodi: epistler
- 1974 Den røde sommerfugl og 5 andre hørespill radio drama
- 1975 De faste lys: norsk reise, travel description
- 1977 En hekto kandis og andre historier
- 1982 Assortiment: fortellinger

=== Drama ===
- 1957 Sommernatt, radio drama broadcast by Radioteatret
- 1958 Strømmen, radio drama
- 1968 Den røde sommerfugl, radio drama broadcast by Radioteatret
- 1970 Nødvendigheten, radio drama broadcast by Radioteatret
- 1970 Batteriet, radio drama broadcast by Radioteatret
- 1970 Fridagen, video drama broadcast by Fjernsynsteatret

== Awards ==
- 1954 – Gyldendal's Endowment
- 1957 – Riksmål Society Literature Prize
- 1963 – Norwegian Booksellers' Prize
- 1987 – Nominated for the Nordic Council's Literature Prize

== Films based on Terje Stigens novels ==
- 1975 Min Marion, directed by Nils R. Müller
- 1963 Elskere, directed by Nils R. Müller
