= Trygve Lange-Nielsen =

Norwegian barrister and judge

Trygve Lange-Nielsen (9 July 1921 – 18 April 2014) was a Norwegian barrister and judge.

He was born in Kristiania as a son of Fredrik Lange-Nielsen (1891–1980) and Laura Stang Lund (1893–1961). He was a maternal grandson of Fredrik Stang Lund. In 1953 he married Sissel Herlofson.

He finished his secondary education in 1940 and graduated with the cand.jur. degree in 1947. He was hired in the Office of the Attorney General of Norway in 1951, and worked here until 1972, only interrupted by a few years in his own law firm. From 1956 he was a barrister, with access to working with Supreme Court cases. From 1972 to 1991 he was a presiding judge in Eidsivating Court of Appeal. Despite passing the normal retirement age, he was then an extraordinary judge in Oslo City Court from 1991 to 1995.

His special fields included insurance law—he chaired Norsk forsikringsjuridisk avdeling from 1971 to 1982—and tort law, in which he lectured at the University of Oslo. He did however become better known for unveiling and overturning miscarriage of justice cases, an endeavor to which he dedicated his later life.

Lange-Nielsen also chaired the Norwegian Association of Lawyers from 1971 to 1975. He resided in Skarpsno. He died in April 2014 in Oslo, following three weeks of illness.
