= William Nyrén =

Norwegian actor

- Born: March 19, 1920; Oslo, Norway
- Died: November 14, 1991 (aged 71)
- Occupation: Actor
- Children: Nils Petter Nyrén

William Nyrén (March 19, 1920 – November 14, 1991) was a Norwegian actor. He appeared in stage roles in Oslo and in films.

Nyrén was born in Oslo. He was imprisoned in Sachsenhausen, Germany, during the Second World War. After returning home, he was engaged with the newly launched Studio Theater until 1952. He also had several roles for NRK's Radio Theater and Television Theater, and he was a regular at the National Traveling Theater from 1954 to 1966. Throughout the 1970s, he performed roles at the National Theater and the Norwegian Theater.

He was the father of the guitarist Nils Petter Nyrén (born 1947).

== Filmography ==
- 1946: Englandsfarere as Heydner
- 1955: Trost i taklampa as Hjalmar
- 1966: Afrikaneren
- 1967: Den lange reisen hjem (TV)
- 1968: De ukjentes marked as Nytorvet, a homeless man
- 1970: Døden i gatene
- 1971: Helten på den grøne øya (TV) as Jimmy Farrel
- 1975: Min Marion as a tenant
- 1980: Nedtur as Åge
- 1981: Sølvmunn as a policeman
