= Ragnar Olason =

Norwegian actor

- Born: March 7, 1901; Lier, Norway
- Died: June 7, 1978 (aged 77); Norway
- Occupation: Actor

Ragnar Olason (March 7, 1901 – June 7, 1978) was a Norwegian actor.

Olason was engaged with the Norwegian Theater and the National Theater in Oslo. He also performed as a screen actor, and he debuted in the 1940 film Godvakker-Maren. In the 1960s and 1970s, Olason performed on NRK's Television Theater.

== Filmography ==
- 1940: Godvakker-Maren as a worker
- 1955: Trost i taklampa as Gunvor's father
- 1955: Hjem går vi ikke
- 1958: Elias rekefisker as the father
- 1961: Hans Nielsen Hauge as a prison guard
- 1973: To fluer i ett smekk as Fredriksen
