= Den sommeren jeg fylte 15 =

1976 film

- Directed by: Knut Andersen
- Written by: Knut Faldbakken (novel); Knut Andersen
- Starring: Steffen Rothschild
- Music by: Eyvind Solås
- Release date: 4 March 1976
- Running time: 90 minutes
- Country: Norway
- Language: Norwegian

Den sommeren jeg fylte 15 (English: The summer I turned 15) is a 1976 Norwegian drama film directed by Knut Andersen, starring Steffen Rothschild, and music composed by Eyvind Solås. The film is based on Knut Faldbakken's novel Insektsommer (Insect Summer). Peter (Rothschild), who was a teenager in the 1950s, is reminiscing about the days of his youth, and his awakening sexuality.
