= Sommerfuglene =

- Directed by: Christian Boger
- Written by: Christian Boger
- Starring: Geraldine Chaplin; Sally Newton; Jonas Bergström; Marit Halset; Lars Nordrum; Paul Kael; Aud Fosse; Tor Åge Bringsværd
- Cinematography: István Korda Kovács
- Edited by: Randi Weum
- Music by: Paul Kael
- Distributed by: Kommunenes filmcentral
- Release date: April 15, 1974
- Running time: 89 minutes
- Country: Norway
- Language: Norwegian

Sommerfuglene (literally, The Butterflies; English title: Summer of Silence) is a Norwegian film from 1974 directed by Christian Boger.

== Plot ==
A young speech therapist arrives at a lonely farm in a mysterious forest to teach a teenage girl to speak after many years of silence. He encounters a strange family, and the summer is full of emotions, confusion, and love hidden in a veil of silence and sounds. Laughter and fun resonate in tragedy. They are surrounded by summer with jealousy, suspicion, and fear, behind closed doors and windows. Occasionally there is a picnic in the forest, or a boat trip on the river, and then sudden departure when summer is over.

== Cast ==
- Geraldine Chaplin as Anne Zimmler
- Sally Newton as Sally Zimmler
- Jonas Bergström as Jonas Voight
- Marit Halset as Mrs. Zimmler
- Lars Nordrum as Mr. Zimmler
- Paul Kael as Carl
- Aud Fosse as Mrs. Voight
- Tor Åge Bringsværd as a railway employee
