= Under en steinhimmel =

1974 film

- Directed by: Knut Andersen; Igor Maslennikov; Stanislav Rostotsky
- Written by: Sigbjørn Hølmebakk
- Starring: Arne Lie; Veslemøy Haslund; Bernhard Ramstad; Dan Fosse; Ragnhild Michelsen; Solfrid Heier; Nils Utsi; Thorleif Reiss; Yevgeny Leonov; Nikolai Burlyayev; Oleg Yankovsky; Anatoly Solonitsyn
- Distributed by: Lenfilm Studio; Teamfilm AS
- Release date: 1974
- Running time: 85 minutes
- Countries: USSR, Norway
- Languages: Russian, Norwegian

Under en steinhimmel (Under a Stone Sky; Russian: Под каменным небом) is a Soviet-Norwegian war film directed by Knut Andersen, Igor Maslennikov, and Stanislav Rostotsky. The film is a fictionalized portrayal of historical events.

== Plot ==
The film tells the story of people that moved into the mine shafts at Bjørnevatn in eastern Finnmark county, Norway during the Second World War. They sought to escape the evacuation and burning of Finnmark. During the winter of 1944, the mines had a population between 2,000 and 3,000. They faced the danger of the German forces hearing about this and taking action before the Red Army managed to drive them out of the area.
