= Asbjørn Toms =

Norwegian actor, stage director and playwright

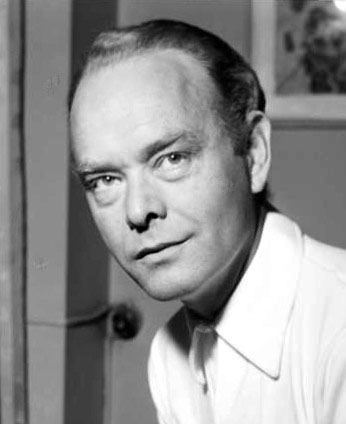
Asbjørn Toms in 1959

Asbjørn Toms (20 October 1915 – 2 April 1990) was a Norwegian actor, stage director and playwright.

Toms was born in Bodø. He was assigned to the theatre Det Norske Teatret from 1940 to 1986, when he retired his breakthrough as dramatist was the children's play Per Svein og lykkesteinane in 1946. He adapted Alf Prøysen's novel Trost i taklampa for theatre in 1952, which was a great hit with the audience. Among his other stage productions were Ole Brumm og vennene hans in 1965 and Ingebrigt Davik's Taremareby in 1966.

He was awarded the King's Medal of Merit in gold in 1986.
