= Mette Lange-Nielsen =

Norwegian actress (1929–1981)

Mette Lange-Nilelsen
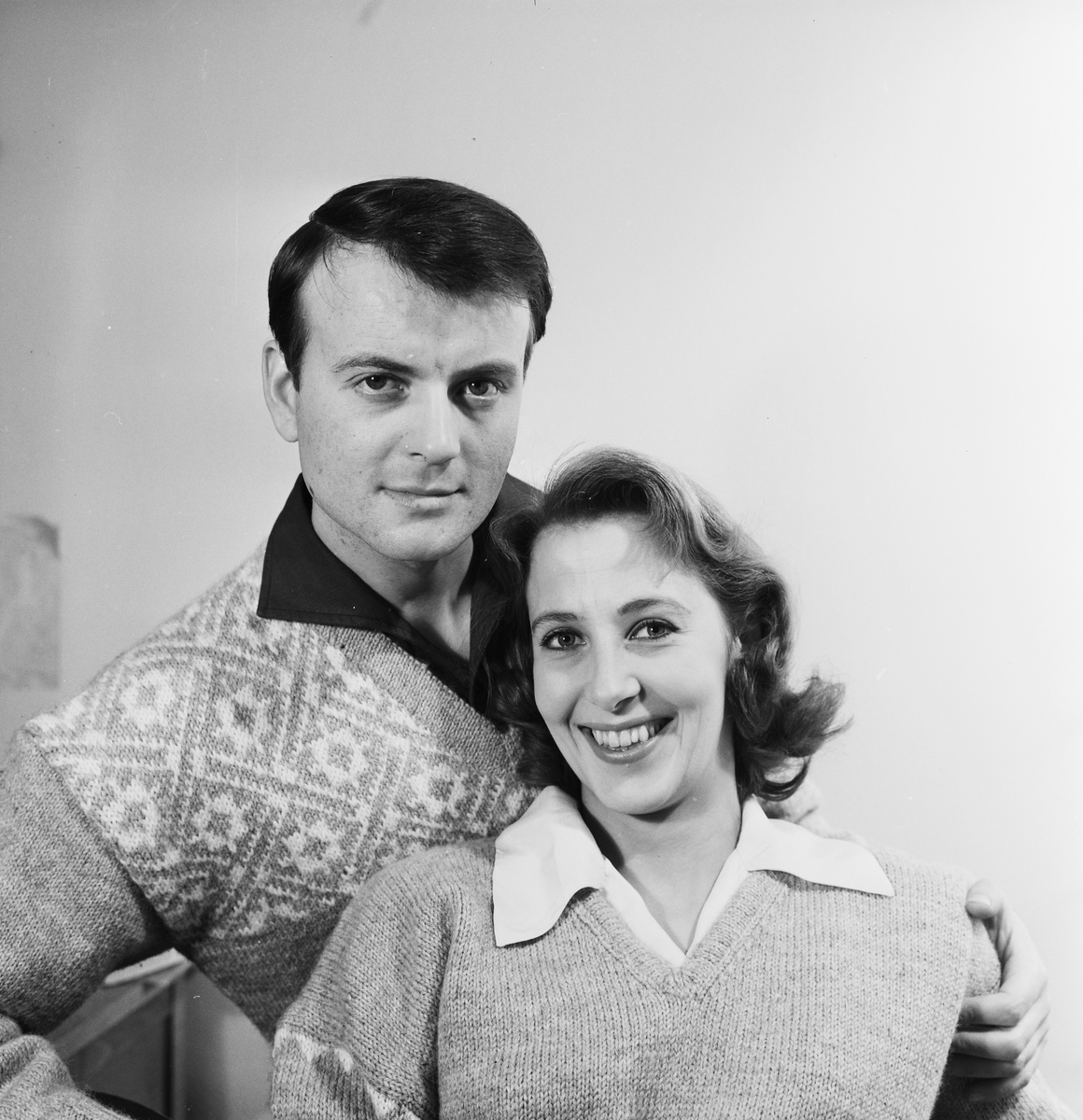
- Per Lillo-Stenberg with Mette Lange-Nielsen, 1958.
- Born: 30 April 1929; Norway
- Died: 29 May 1981 (aged 52)
- Spouse: Actress
- Children: Lars Lillo-Stenberg

Mette Lange-Nielsen (30 April 1929 – 29 May 1981) was a Norwegian actress. Her husband was actor Per Lillo-Stenberg, and her son is musician Lars Lillo-Stenberg.

== Filmography ==
- 1951: Dei svarte hestane
- 1956: Roser til Monica
- 1956: Kvinnens plass
- 1959: Hete septemberdager
- 1959: Støv på hjernen
- 1960: Der Kampf um den Adlerfels (Venner)
- 1961: Bussen
- 1963: Om Tilla
- 1966: Broder Gabrielsen
- 1967: Musikanter
- 1969: Tipp topp. Husmorfilmen
- 1972: Ture Sventon - Privatdetektiv
- 1973: Lina's Wedding (Jentespranget)
- 1975: Min Marion
- 1981: Kleine Ida (Liten Ida)
