= Deilig er fjorden! =

- Directed by: Jan Erik Düring
- Written by: Martin Asphaug; Jan Erik Düring
- Starring: Rolv Wesenlund; Elsa Lystad; Sverre Holm
- Release date: 1985
- Running time: 102 minutes
- Country: Norway
- Language: Norwegian

Deilig er fjorden! (The Fjord Is Lovely!) is a 1985 Norwegian comedy film directed by Jan Erik Düring, starring Rolv Wesenlund, Elsa Lystad and Sverre Holm. Terje Svahberg (Wesenlund) has been saving money for years to buy a summer house, but suddenly decides he wants a boat instead. As he and his family prepare for their summer vacation, they encounter several problems, both practical and financial.

The film title is a pun on the psalm "Deilig er jorden" ("Fairest Lord Jesus").
