= Elias rekefisker =

- Directed by: Jan Erik Düring
- Written by: Sigbjørn Hølmebakk
- Starring: Kristian Løvlie; Eva Svendsen; Ragnar Olason; Ursula Frost Thoresen
- Music by: Maj Sønstevold
- Release date: 30 January 1958
- Running time: 54 minutes
- Country: Norway
- Language: Norwegian

Elias rekefisker (Elias the Shrimp Fisher) is a 1958 Norwegian family film directed by Jan Erik Düring, starring Kristian Løvlie and Eva Svendsen. A family on an island in Southern Norway rescues a carrier pigeon. When the father and son later are lost at sea, the bird comes in handy.
