= Tore Breda Thoresen =

Norwegian cinematographer (1923–2008)

- Born: 29 January 1923; Drammen, Norway
- Died: 1 August 2008 (aged 85)
- Occupations: Photographer; Film director Theatre director

Tore Breda Thoresen (29 January 1923 – 1 August 2008) was a Norwegian photographer, film director and theatre director.

Thoresen was born in Drammen to engineer Georg Thoresen and Edel Sofie Johnsen. In 1952 he married Ursula Jacobine Frost. Among his early films are Trost i taklampa from 1955 and Elias rekefisker from 1958, as photographer. He was appointed artistic director of Fjernsynsteatret from 1967 to 1980.
