= Erik Borge =

Norwegian filmmaker

- Born: 22 October 1924; Kristiania, Norway
- Died: 11 May 2008 (aged 83)
- Occupation(s): Film director and screenwriter
- Awards: Amanda Honorary Award (1989)

Erik Borge (22 October 1924 – 11 May 2008) was a Norwegian film director and screenwriter. He was born in Kristiania. Among his productions was Trost i taklampa from 1955, based on Alf Prøysen's novel. He was manager of the company Norsk Film from 1966 to 1984. He received the Amanda Committee's Honorary Award in 1989, shared with Erik Diesen.
