= Per Lillo-Stenberg =

Norwegian actor

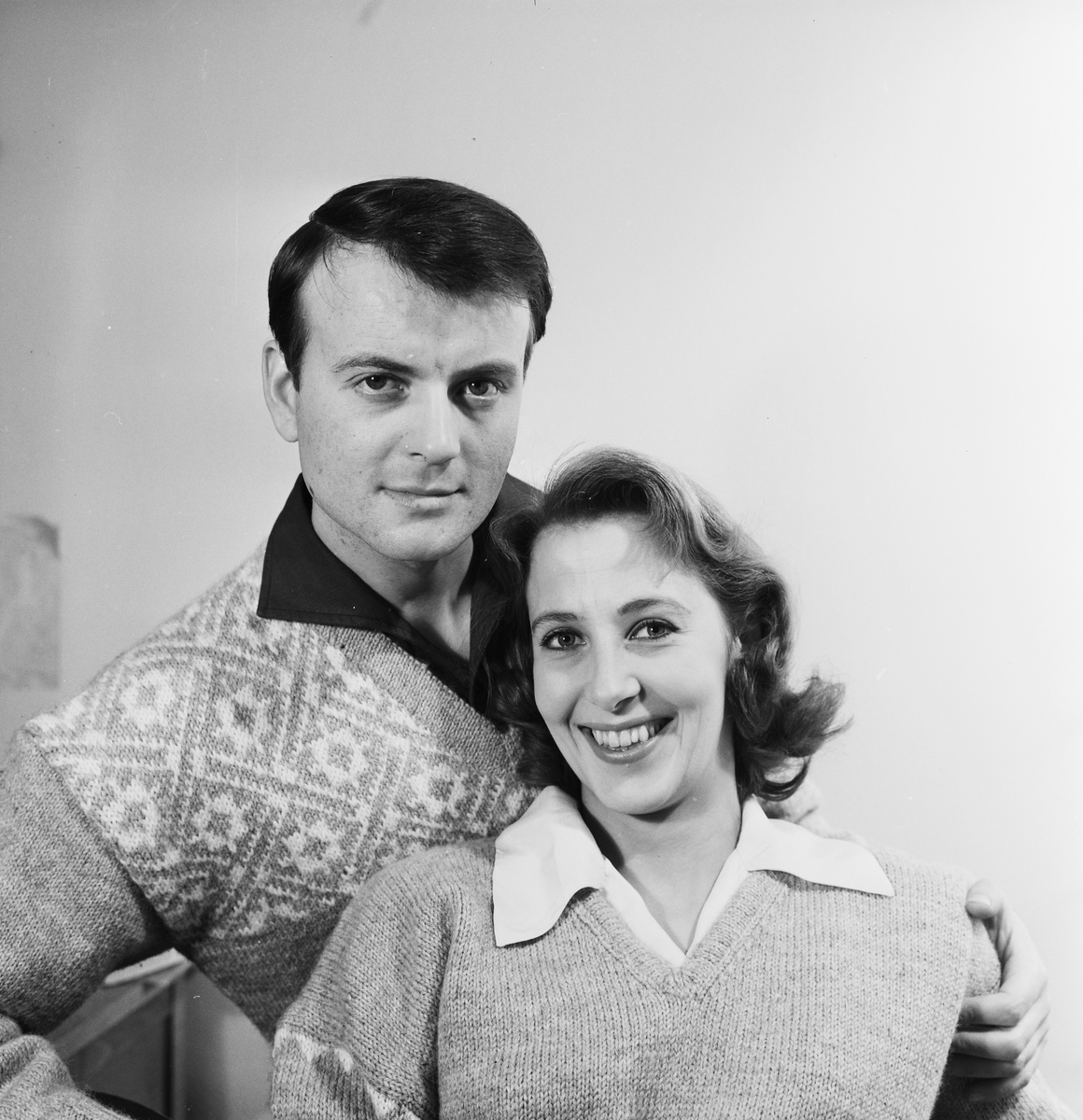
- Lillo-Stenberg (left) with his wife Mette Lange-Nielsen in 1958
- Born: 21 June 1928; Oslo, Norway
- Died: 27 March 2014 (aged 85); Levanger Municipality, Norway
- Occupation: Actor
- Spouse: Mette Lange-Nielsen
- Children: Lars Lillo-Stenberg

Per Lillo-Stenberg (21 June 1928 – 27 March 2014) was a Norwegian actor. His best known roles are in the movies Olsenbanden gir seg aldri! (1981) and Olsenbandens siste stikk (1999). He was born in Oslo. He and his wife Mette Lange-Nielsen had a son, Lars Lillo-Stenberg, a musician for deLillos.

Lillo-Stenberg died after a short illness on 27 March 2014 in Levanger Municipality. He was 85.

== Filmography ==
- 1949: Aldri mer! (Short film)
- 1956: Gylne ungdom
- 1956: Kvinnens plass
- 1957: Peter van Heeren
- 1958: De dødes tjern
- 1959: Støv på hjernen
- 1961: The Passionate Demons (Line)
- 1961: Hans Nielsen Hauge
- 1963: Læraren
- 1964: Alle tiders kupp
- 1966: Hurra for Andersens
- 1966: Broder Gabrielsen
- 1972: Skuggen av ein helt
- 1976: Farlig yrke
- 1981: Olsenbanden gir seg aldri!
- 1999: Olsenbandens siste stikk
- 2002: Regjeringen Martin
- 2004: Salto, salmiakk og kaffe
