= Lucie (1979 film) =

- Directed by: Jan Erik Düring
- Written by: Jan Erik Düring
- Based on: Amalie Skram's novel Lucie
- Produced by: Harald Ohrvik
- Starring: Inger Lise Rypdal; Gösta Ekman; Kari Simonsen; Nils Sletta
- Cinematography: Hans Nord
- Edited by: Bente Kaas
- Music by: Terje Rypdal
- Distributed by: Norsk Film
- Release date: September 7, 1979
- Running time: 99 minutes
- Country: Norway
- Language: Norwegian

Lucie is a Norwegian drama film from 1979 directed by Jan Erik Düring. It stars Inger Lise Rypdal, Gösta Ekman, Kari Simonsen, and Nils Sletta. The film is based on Amalie Skram's novel Lucie, which dealt with the conditions and limitations of women at the end of the 19th century in Norway.

== Plot ==
In the second half of the 19th century, Kristiania (now Oslo) offered a varied entertainment life. There were a number of variety theaters, and the city also had its own brothel district. Prostitution was legal, and it was considered justified for a woman to obtain financial and other benefits from her body and physical advantages.

The beautiful variety theater actress Lucie (played by Inger Lise Rypdal) is certainly aware of this fact. She has made the acquaintance of the lawyer Gerner (Gösta Ekman), a fine and educated gentleman in the city. This all develops into an erotic relationship, and Lucie knows how to play on Gerner's jealousy and masculine pride. She eventually manages to marry into good society, but it proves difficult to be accepted without the right class background. Her life does not turn out as she expected and, after a pregnancy in which the relationship with her husband is constantly deteriorating, she dies in childbirth.

== Reception ==
The film received a mixed reception from both Aftenposten's and Dagbladet's reviewers. Aftenposten's Øyvind Thorsen wrote, among other things: "It is my opinion that the first half of the film is very stagnant; sometimes one gets a little depressed by boredom as well," but he concluded by writing: "A film to be depressed by, but fortunately first and foremost because of its tragic content." Dagbladet's Thor Ellingsen also expressed mixed enthusiasm and wrote, among other things: "I find Lucie significantly better than what advance statements have wanted it to be. In fact, I had thought it was much worse." But he also suggests that Rypdal's performance pulls the film down: "Rypdal's remarks often seem flat and 'modern' in an illusion-breaking way."

== Cast ==
- Inger Lise Rypdal as Lucie
- Gösta Ekman as Gerner
- Rut Tellefsen as Karen Reinertsen
- Kari Simonsen as Nilsa
- Nils Sletta as Olsen
- Sigrid Huun as Henny
- Alf Nordvang as Dr. Mørk
- Unni Evjen as Mrs. Mørk
- Karin Helene Haugen as the housekeeper
- Siri Rom as the midwife
- Arne Bang-Hansen as Brandt
- Elisabeth Høye as a street prostitute
- Peter Lindgren as the rapist
- Svein Tindberg as Knut
- Ingeborg Cook
