= Jonas Bergström =

Swedish actor

- Born: 11 May 1946 (age 80); Stockholm, Sweden
- Occupation: Actor
- Years active: 1968-present

Jonas Bergström (born 11 May 1946) is a Swedish actor and voice actor. He has appeared in more than 30 films and television shows since 1968. He is most well known however for his role as Robin Hood in the Swedish dubbing of Robin Hood.

== Selected filmography ==
- Doctor Glas (1968)
- Ådalen 31 (1969)
- Sommerfuglene (1974)
- Lady Oscar (1979)
- The Day Before You Came (ABBA music video) (1982)
- Murder at the Savoy (1993)
