= Randi Nordby =

Norwegian actress (1926–1991)

- Born: May 15, 1926; Oslo, Norway
- Died: March 28, 1991 (aged 64); Asker, Norway
- Occupation: Actress
- Children: Morten Bing

Randi Nilie Nordby Johnson (May 15, 1926 – March 28, 1991) was a Norwegian actress. She was engaged with the Oslo New Theater for many years. As an actress, she used her maiden name as her stage name.

== Career ==
Randi Nordby started her career very early, and already as a child she was acting in Inga Bjørnson's children's theater. She made her stage debut at age 12 in 1938 in The Women (Norwegian title: Kvinner) by Clare Boothe Luce at the New Theater in Oslo. She made her adult debut in 1945 in Leonid Leonov's play Invasion at the Studio Theater, and she remained there until it had to close in 1950. She was then at the New Theater until 1963. She later performed as a freelance actress. At the New Theater she appeared in plays such as William Shakespeare's Hamlet, Ralph Benatzky and Robert Stolz's The White Horse Inn (Norwegian title: Sommer i Tyrol), and Eugène Ionesco's The Chairs. Later she performed on NRK's Radio Theater and Television Theater.

Nordby made her film debut in Trost i taklampa in 1954. On radio, she became known in the role of Effie in the popular radio play Dickie Dick Dickens.

== Family ==
Nordby was the daughter of the operator Otto A. Nordby (1899–1978) and Kirsten Nordby (née Aas, 1901–1968). She was first married to the Danish theater personality and writer Kaare Trolle Bing (1921–2016), and then to the Swedish film producer Eric Johnson (died 1991). She was the mother of the cultural historian Morten Bing.

== Theater roles ==
- 1938: Little Mary in The Women (Norwegian title: Kvinner) by Clare Boothe Luce at the New Theater
- 1940: Scrap in Dear Octopus (Norwegian title: Guldbryllupet) by Dodie Smith at the New Theater
- 1944: Åse in Det spøker på Klosterodden by Nils-Reinhardt Christensen at the New Theater
- 1944: The young girl in Blink går over alle grenser by Lars Levi Laestadius at the New Theater
- 1944: Evelyn in Jeg kjenner deg ikke by Aldo De Benedetti at the New Theater
- 1945: Nisse in Da kongen kom tilbak at the Studio Theater
- 1945: A Russian patriot in Invasjon by Leonid Leonov at the Studio Theater
- 1946: Agnes in The Beautiful People (Norwegian title: Vakre mennesker) by William Saroyan at the Studio Theater
- 1946: The daughter in The Skin of Our Teeth (Norwegian title: Familien Antrobus) by Thornton Wilder at the Studio Theater
- 1947: Luciana in The Comedy of Errors (Norwegian title: Tvillingene) by William Shakespeare at the Studio Theater
- 1947: A whore in The Threepenny Opera (Norwegian title: Tolvskillingsoperaen) by Bertolt Brecht at the Studio Theater
- 1948: Berthe in Hets by Ingmar Bergman at the Studio Theater
- 1948: Juliette in Le Voyageur sans bagage (Norwegian title: Reisende uten bagasje) by Jean Anouilh at the Studio Theater
- 1948: Lise in Lise i Eventyrland, an adaption of Alice's Adventures in Wonderland by Lewis Carroll at the Studio Theater
- 1949: Title role as Lille rislende kilde at the Studio Theater
- 1950: Mrs. Tambov in Peter den lykkelige by Georges Neveux at the Studio Theater
- 1950: Rebecca Gibbs in Our Town (Norwegian title: Byen vår) by Thornton Wilder at the Studio Theater
- 1951: Pernette in Les Jours heureux (Norwegian title: De lykkelige dagene) by Claude-André Puget at the New Theater
- 1951: Yvette in Bobosse (Norwegian title: Bu bu) by André Roussin at the New Theater
- 1952: Ann Welch in The Deep Blue Sea (Norwegian title: Den dype blå sjøen) by Terence Rattigan at the New Theater
- 1952: Marian Almond in The Heiress (Norwegian title: Arvingen) by Ruth and Augustus Goetz at the New Theater
- 1953: Linda in Pal Joey at the New Theater
- 1953: Ophelia in Hamlet by William Shakespeare at the New Theater
- 1953: Willie in This Property Is Condemned (Norwegian title: Forbudt område) by Tennessee Williams at the New Theater
- 1954: Klara in The White Horse Inn (Norwegian title: Sommer i Tyrol) by Ralph Benatzky and Robert Stolz at the New Theater (also on tour in 1956)
- 1954: Netta the maid in Siste akt by Peter Egge at the New Theater
- 1955: Brit in På fastende hjerte by Alex Brinchmann at the New Theater
- 1955: Gerd in Babels tårn by Lars Helgesson at the New Theater
- 1955: The princess in Trollskipet at the New Theater
- 1956: Lucile in Le Fleuve de feu (Norwegian title: Landet uten vei) by François Mauriac at the New Theater
- 1956: A young girl in Den spanske flue at the New Theater
- 1957: The woman in The Chairs (Norwegian title: Stolene) by Eugène Ionesco at the New Theater
- 1957: Malla in Miss Hook of Holland (Norwegian title: Jomfru Hook) by Austen Hurgon and Paul Rubens at the New Theater (tour)
- 1958: The young girl in Dommeren by Moberg at the New Theater
- 1958: Princess Louisa in The Sleeping Prince (play) (Norwegian title: Den sovende prinsen) by Terence Rattigan at the New Theater
- 1959: Sister Guduoe in Mam'zelle Nitouche (Norwegian title: Nitouche) by Albert Millaud and Henri Meilhac at the New Theater
- 1960: Barbara in The Wrong Side of the Park (Norwegian title: På den andre siden) by John Mortimer at the New Theater
- 1960: Cloris in Lock Up Your Daughters (musical) (Norwegian title: Pass på døtrene) by Bernard Miles, Lionel Bart, and Laurie Johnson at the New Theater
- 1961: Klara in Sommer i Tyrol by Benatzky at the summer theater in Frogner Park
- 1962: Bernadette in Oscar by Claude Magnier at the New Theater
- 1962: Mirka in Kattene by Walentin Chorell at the New Theater
- 1963: Miss Hall in Kamraterna (Norwegian title: Kameratene) by August Strindberg at the Oslo New Theater

== Filmography ==
- 1955: Trost i taklampa as Ingebjørg
- 1958: Bustenskjold as Signe, the widow's daughter
- 1959: Støv på hjernen
- 1961: Sønner av Norge as Mrs. Jørgensen
- 1963: Freske fraspark
- 1966: Hurra for Andersens
- 1969: Psychedelica Blues as Mrs. Korsmo
- 1975: Faneflukt as the mother
- 1975: Skraphandlerne as Aunt Mette
- 1976: Kjære Maren as a lady

== Television ==
- 1970: Selma Brøter (Television Theater) as another office lady
- 1974: Fleksnes in the episode "Beklager, teknisk feil" as the lady next door
- 1976: Fleksnes in the episode "Radioten" as the angry lady next door
- 1981: Fleksnes in the episode "Dobbeltgjengeren" as the witness
- 1981: Helmer & Sigurdson in the episode "Spøkelsesbussen" as a bus passenger
- 1981: Når eplene modnes (Television Theater) as a lady at the boarding house
- 1988: Fleksnes in the episode "Radioten '88" as the angry lady next door
