= Anneke von der Lippe =

Norwegian actress (born 1964)

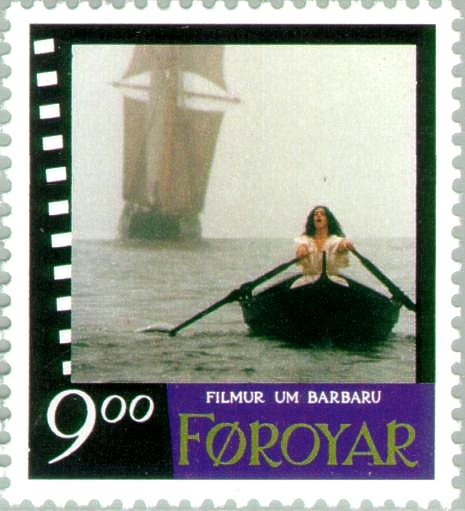
- von der Lippe on a Faroe stamp
- Born: 22 July 1964 (age 61); Oslo, Norway
- Occupation: Actress
- Years active: 1988–present
- Spouse: Morten Cranner
- Children: 2

Anneke von der Lippe (born 22 July 1964) is a Norwegian actress. She made history as the first Norwegian – and Nordic - actress to win an International Emmy Award.

== Biography ==
Von der Lippe graduated from the Norwegian National Academy of Theatre in 1988, and has since acted both at Det Norske Teatret (the Norwegian Theater) and at Nationaltheatret (the National Theatre), in roles such as "Nora" in Henrik Ibsen's A Doll's House, "Masja" in Anton Chekhov's Three Sisters, and "Gwendolen Fairfax" in Oscar Wilde's The Importance of Being Earnest.

She has won the Amanda – the main Norwegian film award – for best actress twice: for Krigerens hjerte in 1992, and for Over stork og stein and Pan in 1995. She was named one of European films' "Shooting Stars" by European Film Promotion in 1998. In 2005, she was nominated as the first ever Norwegian actor for an International Emmy Award, for her role in the TV-drama Ved kongens bord.

In 2015, von der Lippe won an International Emmy Award for her role in the NRK TV-drama Øyevitne.

Von der Lippe lives in Oslo, and is married to director Morten Cranner, with two children.

== Selected filmography ==
- Krigerens hjerte (1992)
- Flaggermusvinger (1992)
- Over stork og stein (1994)
- Pan (1995)
- Only Clouds Move the Stars (1998)
- Misery Harbour (1999)
- Barbara (1997)
- Misery Harbour (1999)
- Lime (2001)
- Ved kongens bord (TV) (2005)
- Trigger (2006)
- De gales hus (2008)
- Ulvenatten (2008)
- Øyevitne (TV) (2014)
- Homesick (2015)
- Kielergata (2018)
- The Girl from Oslo (TV) (2021)
- Troll (2022)
