= Kai Remlov =

Norwegian actor

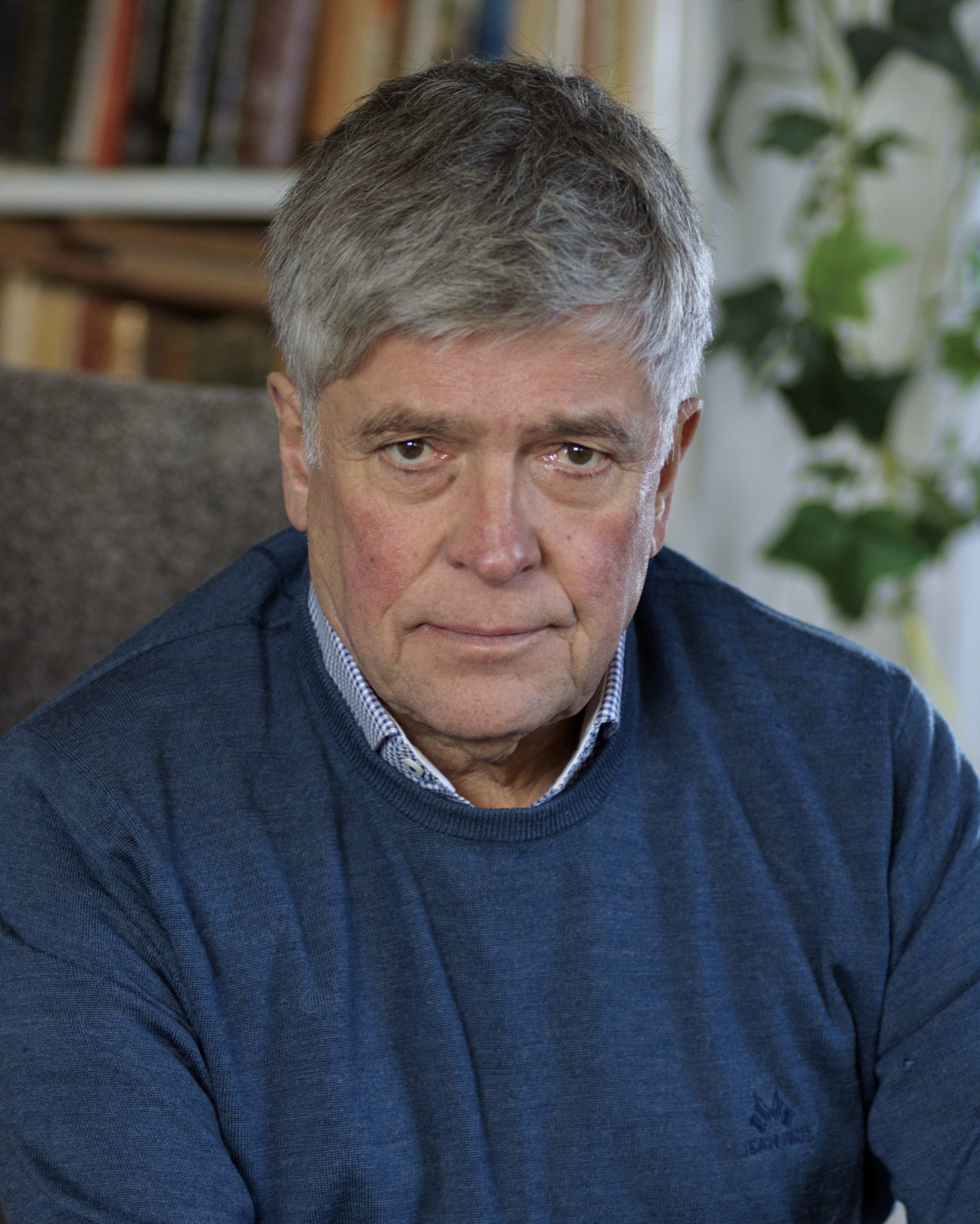
- Born: December 30, 1946 (age 79); Oslo, Norway
- Occupation: Actor
- Father: Arne Remlov
- Relatives: Tom Remlov

Kai Remlov (born December 30, 1946) is a Norwegian actor. He has been engaged with the National Theater in Oslo since 1973, including at its Torshov Theater.

He has played over a hundred characters. He played the main role of Roland Marco in NRK's science fiction series Ta den ring from 1982. He has also played Capulet in Romeo and Juliet, Professor Turman in Geografi og Kærlighed (Geography and Love), John in Oleanna, Hjalmar Ekdahl in The Wild Duck, Dec in Gaucho, and Golaud in Pelléas and Mélisande.

Remlov also played Elias Rukla in the one-man performance Genanse og verdighet (Reconciliation and Dignity) for three seasons starting in the fall of 2000. For this interpretation, he received the Scandinavian National Theater Award. He was named Audiobook Voice of the Year in 2002, and he received the Per Aabel Honorary Award in 2007. He also played Santa in the series Jul på Månetoppen (Christmas at the Top of the Moon).

Kai Remlov is the elder brother of the actor and theater director Tom Remlov.

== Filmography ==
- 1958: Pastor Jarman kommer hjem as Jarman's son
- 1963: Om Tilla as a teenager
- 1963: Skjær i sjøen as Carsten, Eva's boyfriend
- 1970: Ballad of the Masterthief Ole Hoiland as a soldier at Akershus
- 1981: Zeppelin as the boy's father
- 1990: Herman as Jacobsen Jr.
- 1990: The Rescuers Down Under as Krebbs (Norwegian voice)
- 1995: Hører du ikke hva jeg sier! as Stig's father
- 1995: Long Live the Queen (Norwegian voice)
- 1996: Aldri mer 13! as Charlotte's father
- 1997: Livredd as the publishing consultant
- 1998: Thranes metode as Mol's husband
- 1998: Weekend as Kai Strand
- 2006: Marias Menn as Bernard
- 2007: O' Horten as Steiner Sissener
- 2007: Tatt av kvinnen as Slind Hansen
- 2008: Varg Veum – Begravde hunder as Fredriksen
- 2009: Playa del Sol as Bestefar
- 2010: Home for Christmas as a paramedic
- 2012: I Belong as Kristian
- 2025: The Battle of Oslo as Rear Admiral Johannes Smith-Johannsen
