= Eyvind Solås =

- Born: Eyvind Stauri Solås; 11 May 1937; Sandefjord, Vestfold
- Origin: Norway
- Died: 22 April 2011 (aged 73) Oslo
- Genres: Classical music
- Occupations: Pianist, composer and program host
- Instrument: Piano

Eyvind Stauri Solås (11 May 1937 – 22 April 2011) was a Norwegian musician, composer, actor and program host in NRK, both the Norwegian television and radio.

Solås was instrumental in the establishment of the music and theater line subjects at Romerike Folk High School, where he was a professor in the late 1960s. He later worked for the Norwegian Broadcasting Corporation from 1969 to 2002 where he hosted the TV series Musikknytt from 1972 to 1986. He released the LP "Professoren" with Knut Høiland in 1974 and later "Eyvind & Trond-Viggo" with Trond Viggo Torgersen in 1980. He wrote the music for twenty radio plays.

== Career ==
Solås is a graduate of the Musikkonservatoriet i Oslo and got a German state scholarship for further studies at the Academy of Music in Köln. In 1968 he earned a magisters of Musicology at the Universitetet i Oslo, with the thesis "En studie i Harald Sæverud's scenemusikk til Peer Gynt" (A study in Harald Sæverud's incidental music to Peer Gynt).

Solås was active as an actor and composer at the «Teater Neuf» (Student theater), and «Teaterverkstedet» in Oslo 1950–70. He was awarded the Order of Student Theatre «Den Hvide Knap» in 1958 and received the degree of Knight. During many years he was also active as a professional actor at the places «Riksteatret», «Teater Ibsen» and in several revues by Ole Paus. The theater was the basis for Solås's development as a composer, and he himself said: «In particular, I received a number of stylistic challenges and a growing understanding of music as an essential part of a larger artistic context».

Together with Reidar Skagestad, Solås built up the music and theater line at «Romerike Folkehøgskole». In his educational work and as an employee of radio and television, he has had the opportunity to try out musical ideas in a variety of fields, including speaking choir and sound art in radio drama context. Solås has composed music for the Norwegian films Liten Ida (1981), Den sommeren jeg fylte 15 (1976) og Brannen (1973). He has also been active writing music for various music magazines. In 1993 he published the book Ensom vandrer: fantasier og refleksjoner i Edvard Griegs landskap (Lonely wanderer: fantasies and reflections in Edvard Grieg's landscapes).

From 1969 Solås worked in NRK. He was music director in television from 1988 to 1990. In 1996 he moved to the music editors of the radio channel NRK P2. He created a number of programs in which he portrayed Norwegian composers and performers, including Musikknytt on TV in the period 1972–86. This was a music magazine that provoked much discussion and attention, especially because the journalistic presentation had elements of a distinctive form of gjøglerisk absurdism. He joined the Norwegian Broadcasting Corporation in 2002, and also produced several short humor fixture on television in the 1980s, like 'the music professor' and 'the composer', from Musikknytt is the characters best known to the TV viewers.

Solås met with Hitlers's arms minister and close collaborator Albert Speer spring 1980 in conjunction with work on a series for the NRK on music and the National Socialism. On that occasion he received an interview with Speer at his residence.

== Works ==
- 1968: "En studie i Harald Sæveruds scenemusikk til Peer Gynt", (Master's thesis UiO)
- 1993: "Ensom vandrer. Fantasier og refleksjoner i Edvard Griegs landskap"
- 1999: "Spillet om Peer Gynt, eller Peer Gynt som musikkdramatisk kasteball", at «Peer Gynt-stemnet», Vinstra 31. July 31– August 8, 1999

== Compositions (in selection) ==
- 1965/1986: Two string quartets
- 1968: Bendik og Årolilja, stage cantata for mixed choir, soloists and 8 instruments
- 1969: Det är vackrast när det skymmer, for mixed choir, lyrics by Per Lagerkvist
- 1970: Måne over gjøglervogna, ballet pantomime
- 1970: Skogens øyne, lyrical Suite for Strings
- 1984: Music for Oboe and Strings
- 1984: Theme and Miniature Variations, klaverkonsert, 1984
- 1986: Musikk til en by ved havet
- 1988: Mythos for orkester
- 1990: Maskespill for clarinet, trombone and piano
- 2002: Historien om en mor, for narrator, soprano solo and orchestra, texts by H. C. Andersen
