= The Warrior's Heart =

1992 film by Leidulv Risan

- Norwegian poster
- Directed by: Leidulv Risan
- Written by: Arthur Johansen; Leidulv Risan
- Produced by: Elin Erichsen and Gunnar Svensrud
- Starring: Espen Skjønberg
- Cinematography: Harald Paalgard
- Edited by: Einar Egeland
- Release date: 1992
- Running time: 102 minutes
- Country: Norway
- Language: Norwegian

The Warrior's Heart (Norwegian: Krigerens hjerte) is a 1992 Norwegian film, directed by Leidulv Risan and starring Anneke von der Lippe, Peter Snickars, Thomas Kretschmann, Bjørn Sundquist and Iren Reppen. It was screened out of competition at the 1992 Cannes Film Festival. The film was selected as the Norwegian entry for the Best Foreign Language Film at the 65th Academy Awards, but was not accepted as a nominee.

== Plot ==
A love story during the Second World War in Scandinavia. Ann Mari, a Norwegian, works as a nurse in the Winter War of 1939/40 between Finland and the Soviet Union. She falls in love with the Finnish soldier Markus. The war stops temporarily, and they settle down in northern Norway. Norway gets occupied by Germany and Markus leaves Ann Mari, as Finland goes to war again to win back the lost territory. A short time later Markus seems to be dead and Ann Mari falls in love with the German soldier Maximilian. But Markus soon returns alive. After a struggle for Ann Mari the three take refuge from the Germans to Sweden, but Sweden deports foreign deserters.

== Cast ==
- Anneke von der Lippe as Ann Mari Salmi
- Peter Snickars as Markus Salmi
- Thomas Kretschmann as Lt. Maximillian Luedt
- Mona Hofland as Ann Mari's mother
- Juha Muje as Olli
- Bjørn Sundquist as Karl Simonnaes
- Solfrid Heier as Mrs. Simmonaes
- Iren Reppen as Kari Simonnaes
- Paul-Ottar Haga as Claus
- Per Christensen as Vicar
- Werner Heinrich Möller as Claus
- Christoph Künzler as Captain

== See also ==
- List of submissions to the 65th Academy Awards for Best Foreign Language Film
- List of Norwegian submissions for the Academy Award for Best Foreign Language Film
