= Home for Christmas (2010 film) =

- Film poster
- Norwegian: Hjem til jul
- Directed by: Bent Hamer
- Written by: Bent Hamer
- Starring: Trond Fausa Aurvåg; Fridtjov Såheim; Reidar Sørensen; Ingunn Beate Øyen; Nina Andresen Borud; Tomas Norström; Joachim Calmeyer; Kai Remlov; Cecilie Mosli; Arianit Berisha; Igor Necemer; Nina Zanjani; Henriette Steenstrup; Gard Eidsvold; Robert Skjærstad; Levi Henriksen; Kyrre Haugen Sydness; Aina Emilie Bækkevold; Marcus Eiel Fagervik
- Release date: September 13, 2010 (Toronto)
- Running time: 90 minutes
- Countries: Norway; Sweden; Germany
- Language: Norwegian

Home for Christmas (Norwegian: Hjem til jul) is a 2010 Norwegian comedy-drama film directed by Bent Hamer.

“Home for Christmas” is based on a selection of short stories from the Norwegian author Levi Henriksen's collection, ”Only Soft Presents Under the Tree”. These stories, which now and then intersect with each other, all take place in Henriksen's fictitious small town of Skogli, over a couple of hours on Christmas Eve.

== Storyline ==
Following a prologue set in war-torn former Yugoslavia, the film follows several different Christmas celebrations in the small Norwegian town of Skogli. Paul is a thirty-three-year-old laborer who marches into his doctor's office demanding a prescription, then proceeds to lay bare all his woes. The doctor is beleaguered by his own marital and financial difficulties (he's left his upset wife to work emergency calls on Christmas Eve). There's also an elderly man preparing an esoteric ritual, a vagrant who runs into an old flame, a middle-aged couple in the throes of passion, a boy hopelessly in love with his Muslim neighbor, and a young émigré couple whose car breaks down as the woman goes into labor.

== Cast ==
- Nina Andresen Borud as Karin
- Arianit Berisha as Goran
- Joachim Calmeyer as Simon
- Trond Fausa as Paul
- Levi Henriksen
- Cecile Mosli as Elise
- Igor Necemer as Serb
- Tomas Norström as Kristen
- Kai Remlov
- Morten Ilseng Risnes as Thomas
- Sarah Bintu Sakor as Bintu
- Isaka Sawadogo as Bintu's father
- Kristine Rui Slettebakken as Tone
- Nadja Soukup as Goran's mother
- Kyrre Haugen Sydness as Hroar
- Fridtjov Såheim as Knut
- Reidar Sørensen as Jordan
- Nina Zanjani as Albanian woman
- Ingunn Beate Øyen as Johanne Jakobsen

== Soundtracks ==
=== Music ===
by John Erik Kaada

==== Silent Night (in thai language) ====
sung by Songsit Ohm Lertsethtakarn - lyrical tenor

text in thai language by Songsit Ohm Lertsethtakarn

==== Home for Christmas (in English) ====
written and sung by Maria Mena

== Award ==
=== Amanda Awards, Norway 2011 ===
Nominated Amanda	Best Supporting Actor (Årets mannlige birolle) Trond Fausa
Nominated Amanda	Best Cinematography (Årets foto) John Christian Rosenlund
Nominated Amanda	Best Sound Design (Årets lyddesign) Petter Fladeby

=== RiverRun International Film Festival 2011 ===
Won Audience Choice Award	Best Narrative Feature Bent Hamer

FESTIVALS AWARDS	Best Script - San Sebastian 2010 Toronto Int. Film Festival 2010; London IFFF; São Paulo Film festival etc. Hamburg Filmfest; Lübecker Filmtage

== See also ==
- List of Christmas films
