= Sissel Lange-Nielsen =

Norwegian writer (1931–2023)

Sissel Aabel Lange-Nielsen, née Herlofson (27 January 1931 – 28 September 2023) was a Norwegian writer, literary critic, and journalist.

Born in Kristiansund, she won the Riksmål Society Literature Prize in 1982. She was a member of the Norwegian Academy for Language and Literature.

She was married to barrister and judge Trygve Lange-Nielsen (1921–2014).
