= Tor Obrestad =

Norwegian poet (1938–2020)

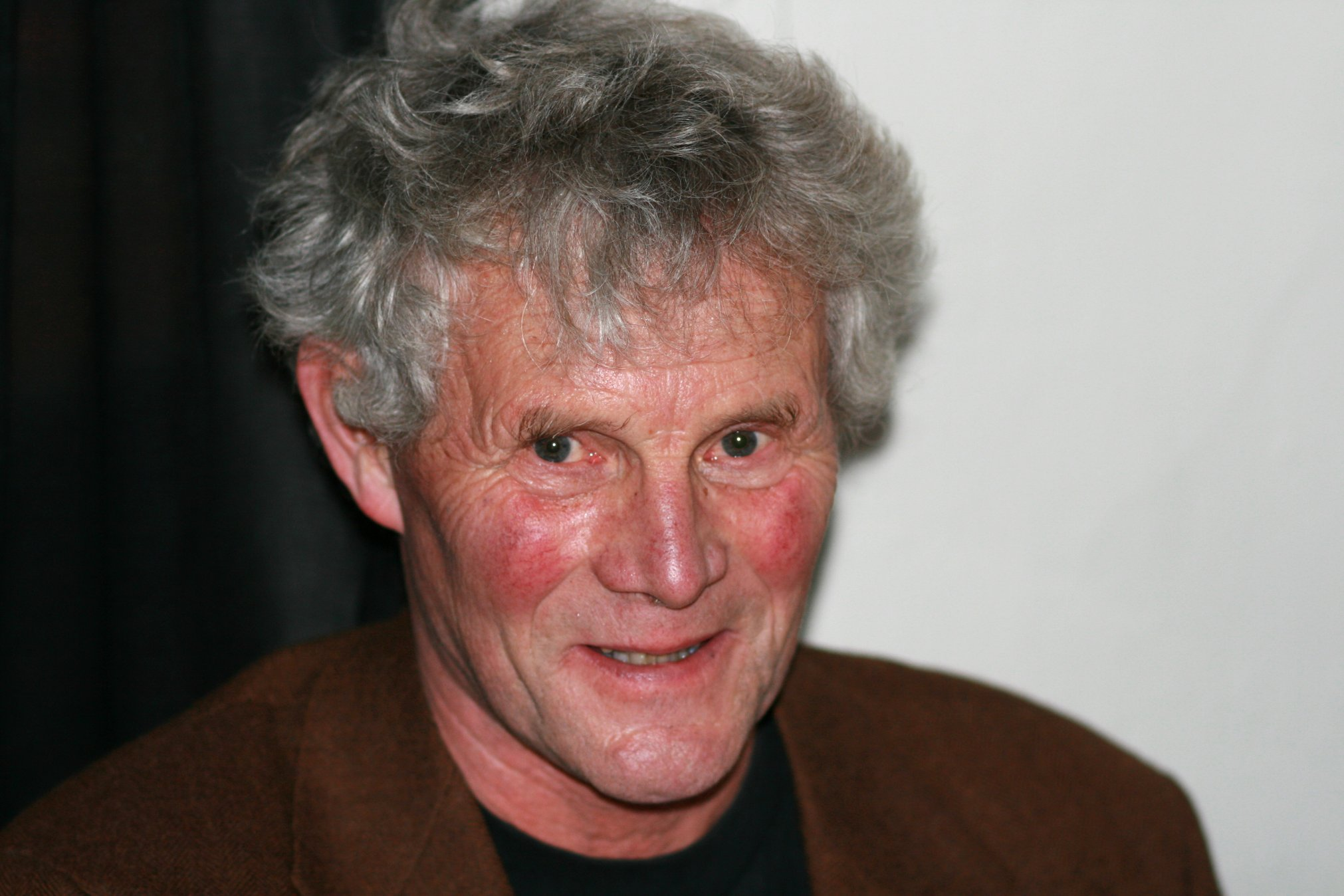
- Born: 12 February 1938; Hå, Norway
- Died: 25 January 2020 (aged 81); Nærbø, Norway
- Occupations: Novelist, poet and documentary writer
- Writing career
- Period: 1966–2020
- Genres: Poetry, short stories, biography

Tor Obrestad (12 February 1938 – 25 January 2020) was a Norwegian novelist, poet and documentary writer.

== Early and personal life ==
Obrestad was born in Hå Municipality on 12 February 1938. His parents were farmer Jon R. Obrestad and Sophie Riise.

He studied at the teacher's college in Elverum and worked as a schoolteacher, and then studied at the University of Oslo. He eventually became a full-time writer, and was also assigned as journalist for the newspaper Stavanger Aftenblad. He died on 25 January 2020.

== Literary career ==
Obrestad made his literary debut in 1966 with two books, the poetry collection Kollisjon and a collection of short stories, Vind, and received Tarjei Vesaas' debutantpris for these two books. He was a member of the so-called Profil generation in 1968, the circle attached to the literary magazine Profil. He wrote biographies on Arne Garborg, Hulda Garborg, Alexander Kielland and Einar Førde.

His novel Sauda! Streik! from 1972 was adapted for the film Streik!, directed by Oddvar Bull Tuhus in 1975.

== Selected works ==
- Kollisjon, poetry, 1966
- Vind, short stories, 1966
- Vårt daglige brød, poetry, 1968
- Marionettar, novel, 1969
- Den norske løve, poetry, 1970
- Sauda! Streik!, novel, 1972
- Sauda og Shanghai, poetry, 1973
- Stå saman, poetry, 1974
- Tolken, short stories, 1975
- Baba Anastasia og andre tekster, short stories, 1976
- Stå på! Roman om ein arbeidskonflikt, novel, 1976
- Vinterdikt, poetry, 1979
- Reisa til bestemor, children's book, 1980
- Ein gong må du seie adjø, novel, 1981
- Sjå Jæren, gamle Jæren, short stories, 1982
- Kamelen i Jomarskogen, children's book, 1985
- Misteltein, poetry, 1987
- Seks netter, seks dagar, novel, 1989
- Arne Garborg, biography, 1991
- Hulda, biography of Hulda Garborg, 1992
- Forsøk på å halde fast tida, short stories, 1993
- Mimosa, myosotis, rosmarin, poetry, 1994
- Sannhetens pris. Alexander Kielland, biography, 1996
- Jæren. Eld or blått. Ei samling poesi i ord og bilete, poetry, 1997
- Bernhards mor. En drøm, novel, 1998
- Kvinnene i Casablanca og andre historier, short stories, 2002
- Krokodillen Alexander og navigator emeritus, Reinert i Sjøhusgaten. Ei oppbyggeleg fortelling frå ein liten by, children's book, 2002
- Einar Førde, biography, 2007

== Awards ==
- Tarjei Vesaas' debutantpris 1966
- Gyldendal's Endowment 1971
