= Rolf Nannestad =

Norwegian actor

- Born: August 29, 1887; Svinør, Norway
- Died: December 14, 1969 (aged 82)
- Occupation: Actor

Rolf Nannestad (August 29, 1887 – December 15, 1969) was a Norwegian actor.

Nannestad was born in Svinør, Norway. He worked at the New Theater in the 1930s, and he was later engaged with the Norwegian Theater, People's Theater, Oslo New Theater, and Stage 7. Nannestad appeared in several films between 1938 and 1968, with his film debut in Det drønner gjennom dalen.

== Filmography ==
- 1937: Det drønner gjennom dalen as a forest worker
- 1962: Tonny
- 1968: Sus og dus på by'n as the tenant in the attic
- 1968: De ukjentes marked as Skakkhode
- 1969: Olsenbanden
