= Johan Kjelsberg =

Norwegian actor

Johan Brun Kjelsberg (8 July 1931 – 8 June 2012) was a Norwegian actor.

He was born in Alta Municipality. He made his stage debut in 1952 at Folketeatret, was then employed at Rogaland Teater from 1953 to 1956. After a period at Den Nationale Scene from 1956 to 1964, he spent another year at Rogaland Teater from 1968 to 1969. He was then at Det Norske Teatret from 1970 to 1987 and 1996 to 2001. He died in June 2012 in Arendal.
