= Broder Gabrielsen =

- Directed by: Nils R. Müller
- Written by: Victor Borg; Alf Malland
- Starring: Alf Malland; Mette Lange-Nielsen
- Release date: 3 February 1966
- Running time: 97 minutes
- Country: Norway
- Language: Norwegian

Broder Gabrielsen (English: Brother Gabrielsen) is a 1966 Norwegian drama film directed by Nils R. Müller, starring Alf Malland and Mette Lange-Nielsen. The preacher Gabrielsen (Malland) has a great talent for exciting crowds and builds up a large following. His reputation is enhanced by a healing at a meeting, and Gabrielsen begins to believe in his own healing ability. When further miracles fail to occur, he experiences a crisis. The film was highly controversial in its time because of its treatment of religious fanaticism and charismatic congregations.
