= Knut Andersen (film director) =

Norwegian film director (1931–2019)

- Born: 9 May 1931; Harstad, Norway
- Died: 17 June 2019 (aged 88); Oslo, Norway
- Occupation: Film director
- Years active: 1957–1985

Knut Andersen (9 May 1931 – 17 June 2019) was a Norwegian film director. He was born in Harstad. He directed a series of films, including Sus og dus på by'n (1968), Ballad of the Masterthief Ole Hoiland (1970), Marikens bryllup (1972), Under a Stone Sky (1974), Karjolsteinen (1977), and Den sommeren jeg fylte 15 (1975). He received the Amanda Committee's Honorary Award in 2007.

His 1969 film Scorched Earth was entered into the 6th Moscow International Film Festival, where it won a diploma.
