= Mattis Mathiesen =

Norwegian film director and cinematographer (1924–2010)

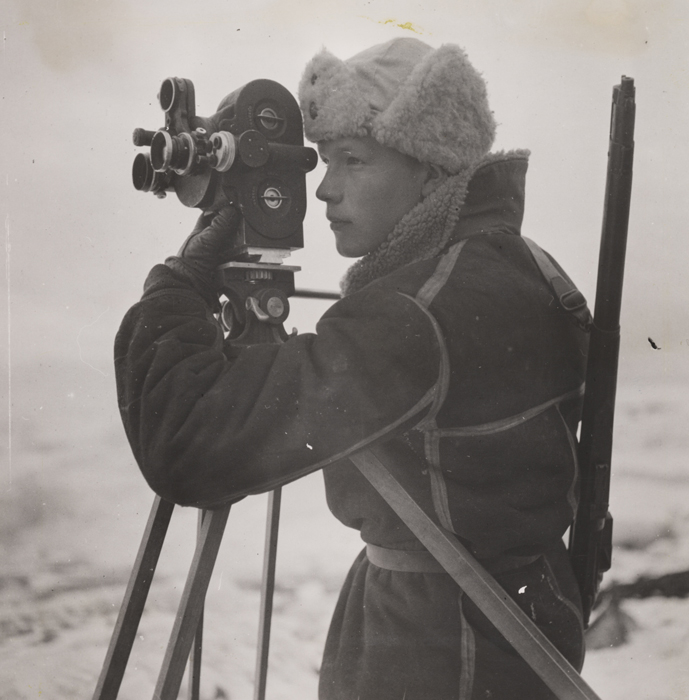
- Mathiesen at work on Jan Mayen
- Born: Mattis Leonid Rakov Alexevitch Mathiesen; 30 May 1924; Ålesund, Møre og Romsdal, Norway
- Died: 9 October 2010 (aged 86)
- Occupations: Photographer, film director

Mattis Leonid Rakov Alexevitch Mathiesen (30 June 1924 – 9 October 2010) was a Norwegian photographer and film director.

He hailed from Ålesund. His grandfather was a Russian immigrant. Mathiesen stayed in the United Kingdom during the Second World War, where he learned photography.

He worked in the company Teamfilm. He did the photography for, among others, Elskere (1963) and Vildanden (1963, TV 1989). In 1970 he won the Aamot-statuetten. He was also the photographer for the Olsenbanden films. He was the producer of Viva Villaveien! (1989) and distributor of Fredrikssons fabrikk (1994).

He lived in Bærum, and died in October 2010.
