= Lars Lillo-Stenberg =

Norwegian rock musician (born 1962)

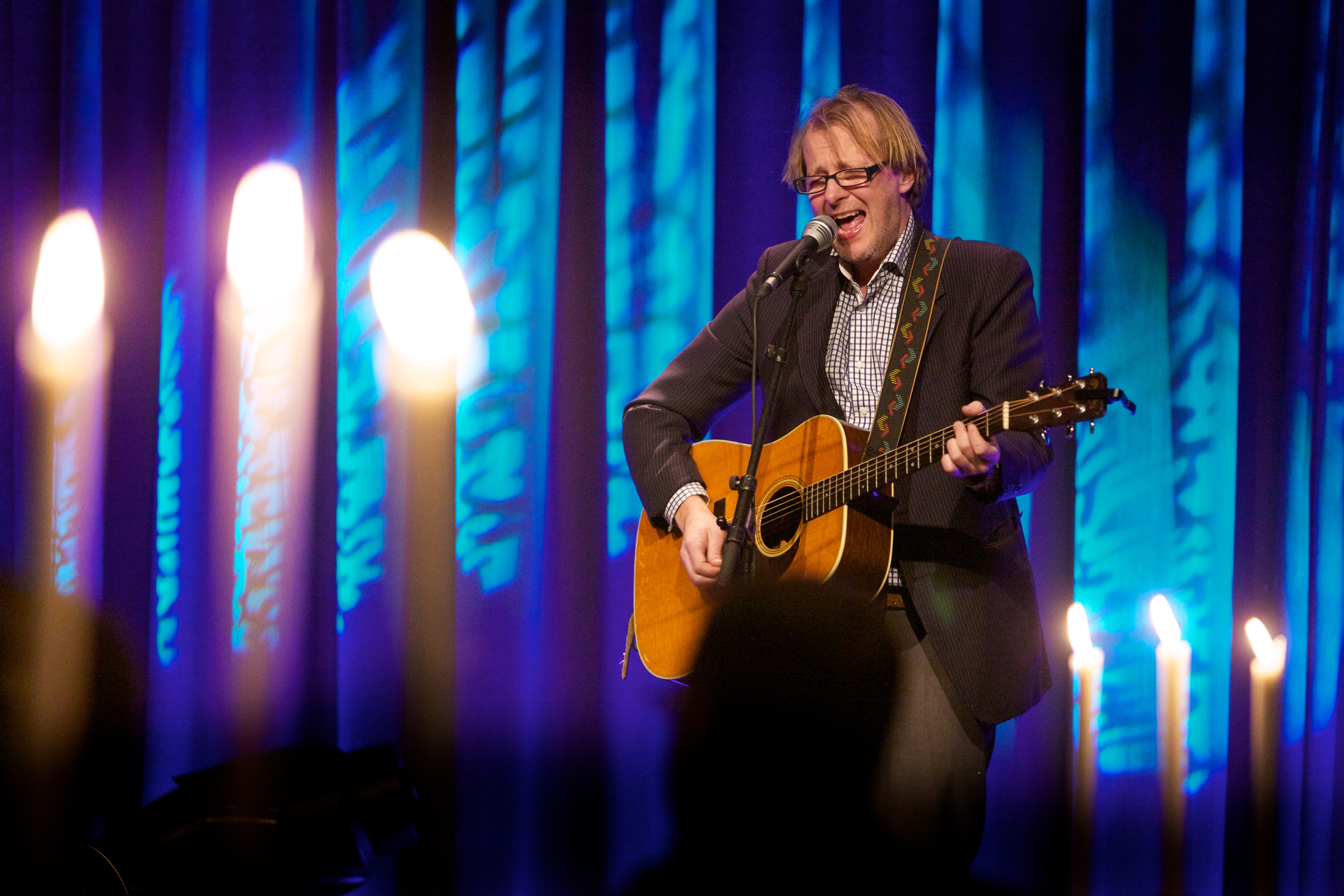
- Stenberg performing in 2010

Background information
- Born: 30 June 1962 (age 64); Frogner, Oslo, Norway
- Genres: Rock, Pop rock
- Instruments: Vocals, Guitar, Bass, Piano, Keyboards, Synth, Mandolin, Hammond, Percussion

Lars Lillo-Stenberg (born 30 June 1962) is a Norwegian rock musician. He is the man behind the Norwegian band deLillos, but he also played in The Last James and still plays in the band Young Neils. He has also recorded many solo albums. He is the son of the actors Per Lillo-Stenberg and Mette Lange-Nilsen. He grew up at Frogner in Oslo. Lillo-Stenberg is married to the actress Andrine Sæther.

== Discography ==
- Å jeg var en sangfugl 10 September 1996, Kirkelig Kulturverksted
- the Freak recorded by Universal, 1999).
- Oslo recorded 9 April 2000 by Sonet
- Buddy
- song from movie "Elling" (Motion Picture by Maipo Film Og TV Produksjon): "Se På Meg" (released as CD-single, 2001)
- Synger Prøysen (Philips - 2006)
