= Ballad of the Masterthief Ole Hoiland =

1970 film

- Directed by: Knut Andersen
- Written by: Knut Andersen; Harald Tusberg
- Starring: Per Jansen; Sverre Hansen; Aud Schønemann; Anne Marit Jacobsen; Ola Isene; Kjersti Døvigen; Harald Heide-Steen Jr. Eva von Hanno; Leif Juster; Sølvi Wang; Lillian Lydersen
- Release date: 1970
- Running time: 104 minutes
- Country: Norway
- Language: Norwegian

Ballad of the Masterthief Ole Hoiland (Norwegian: Balladen om mestertyven Ole Høiland) is a 1970 Norwegian drama film directed by Knut Andersen, and starring a broad cast of notable Norwegian actors, headed by Per Jansen as Ole Høiland. Ole Høiland was an actual Norwegian Robin Hood-figure in the early 19th century. He steals from the rich and gives to the poor, enjoying numerous affairs with attractive women along the way. The story culminates in the ambitious burglary of Norges Bank, Norway's central bank.

== Plot ==
The film depicts the life and fate of Ole Høiland, portraying him as a legendary figure akin to a Norwegian Robin Hood or an Eastland counterpart to the master thief Gjest Bårdsen. The narrative follows his criminal exploits up until his final life sentence. After King Oscar I denies his petition for a pardon—which Høiland had requested on the condition that he leave the country—he commits suicide by hanging himself in prison.

While the suicide is historically accurate, the film takes creative liberties with his age; it portrays Høiland as a relatively young man at the time of his death, whereas the historical figure was approximately 50 years old. Additionally, the film emphasizes Høiland's reputation as a "ladies' man," a trait that aligns with historical accounts, and features several erotic scenes that were considered quite bold for the time of its release.
