= Alf Prøysen =

Norwegian singer-songwriter and author (1914–1970)

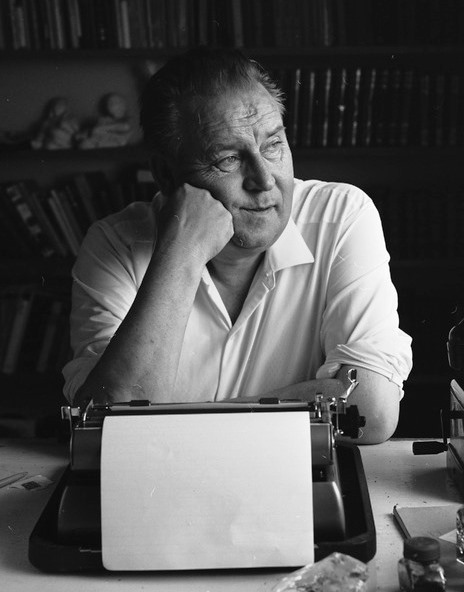
- Alf Prøysen with his typewriter in 1964
- Born: 23 July 1914; Ringsaker in Hedmark, Norway
- Died: 23 November 1970 (aged 56); Oslo, Norway
- Resting place: Cemetery of Our Saviour, Oslo
- Occupations: author, poet and musician
- Notable work: Dørstokken heme (1945)
- Spouse: Else Storhaug (1948–2015)
- Children: 2
- Awards: Arts Council Norway Honorary Award

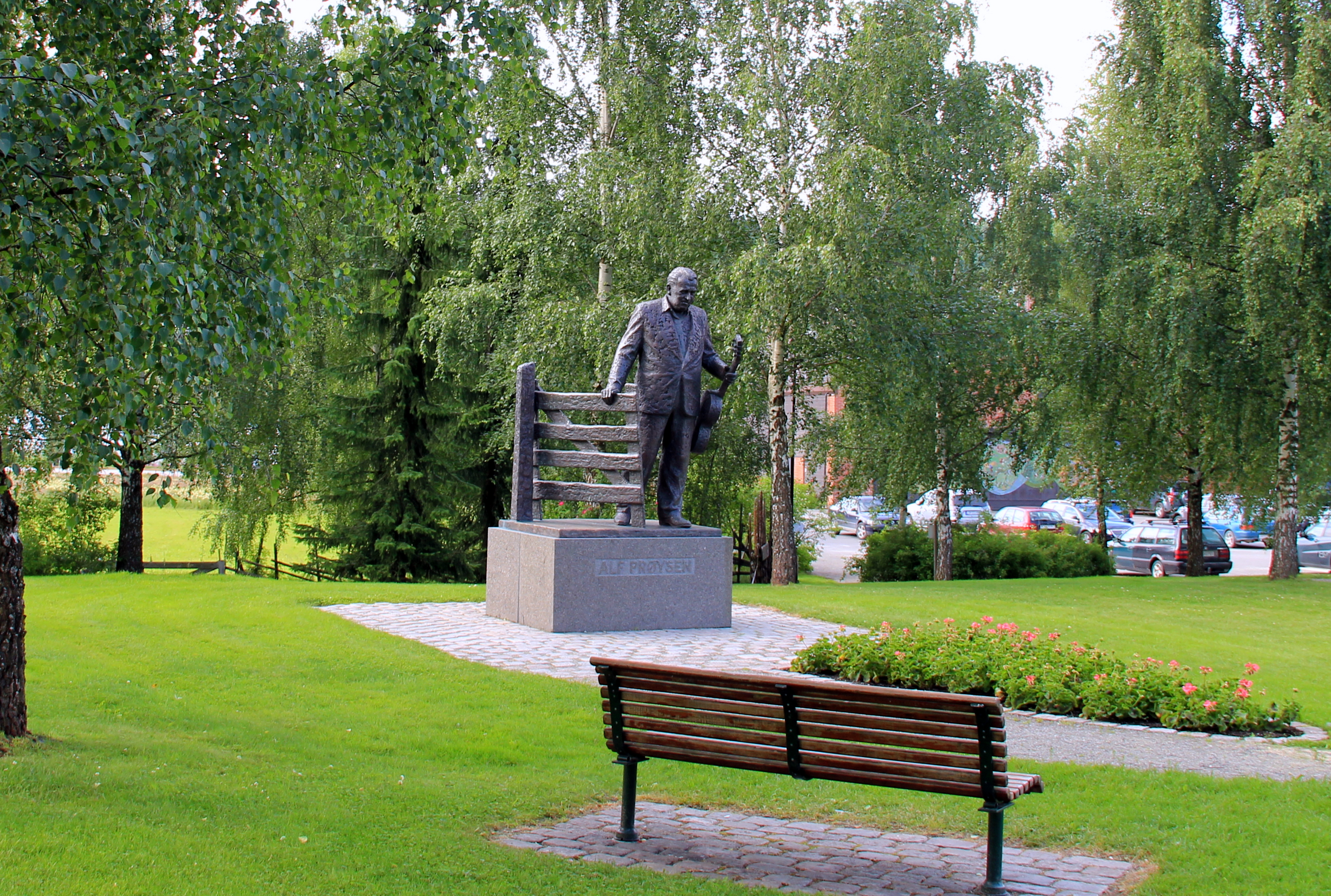
Statue of Alf Prøysen at Rudshøgda in Ringsaker by Sivert Donali

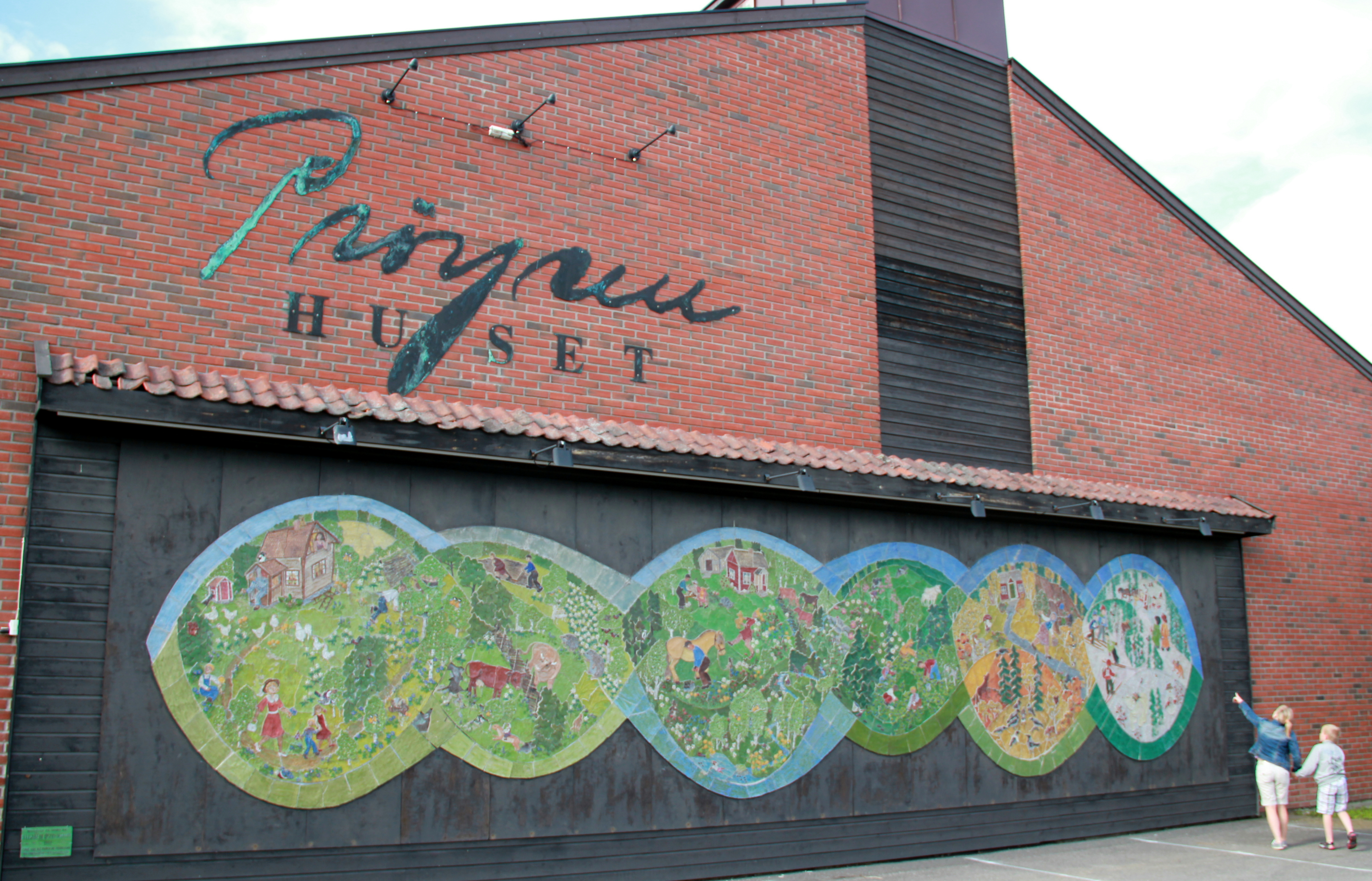
Prøysenhuset at Rudshøgda in Ringsaker

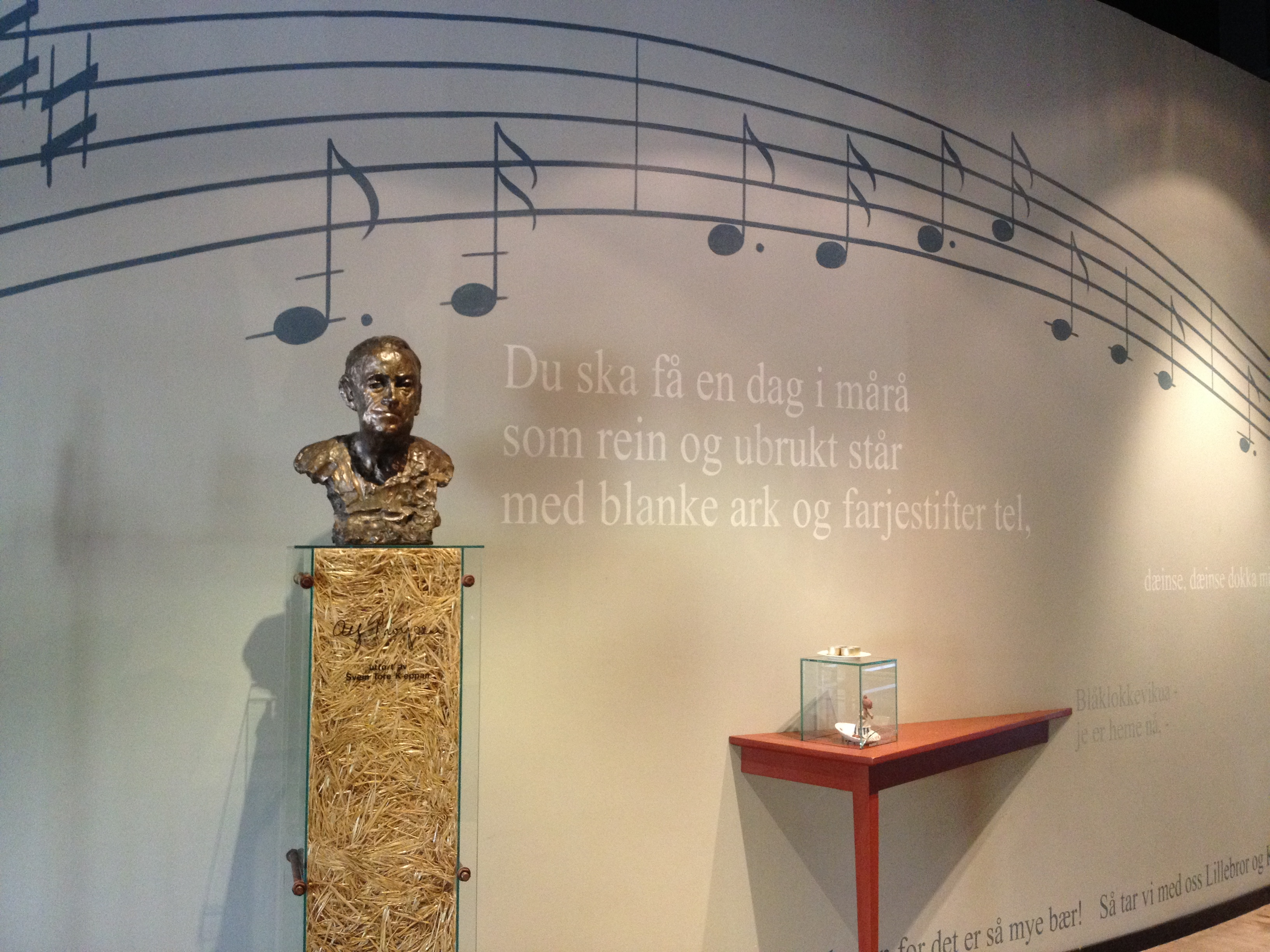
Exhibit at Prøysenhuset

Alf Prøysen (Norwegian pronunciation: [ɑɫf ˈprœʏsn̩]) (23 July 1914 – 23 November 1970) was a Norwegian author, poet, playwright, songwriter and musician. Prøysen was one of the most important Norwegian cultural personalities in the second half of the 20th century. He worked in several different media including books, newspapers and records. He also made significant contributions to music as well as to television and radio. He also wrote in the Arbeiderbladet from 1954 until his death.

He was also noted for his series of books featuring Mrs. Pepperpot (Norwegian: Teskjekjerringa). The fictional character of a series of children's books established him as a children's author. The series of books were first published during 1956 and was first published in English in 1959.

== Background ==
He was born Alf Olafsen at Rudshøgda in Ringsaker Municipality in Hedmark county, Norway. He grew up at the Croft farm Prøysen, which was named after the Kingdom of Prussia. He was the son of Olaf Andreassen (1880–1959) and Julie Mathiasdatter (1879–1961). He was raised as the youngest of four children born to a rural farm family.

== Career ==
Prøysen became an apprentice at the Norwegian School of Applied Sciences, where he was a copywriter and actor in the annual student reviews from 1942 to 1945. He became associated with NRK, making his recording debut in 1947. Prøysen soon became a national celebrity. Through songs such as Husmannspolka, Tango for to, Lillebrors vise, Du ska få en dag i mårå, Julekveldsvis, Jørgen Hattemaker, Musevisa and Romjulsdrøm he became extremely popular through the 1950s and 1960s. Prøysen contributed to many artistic fields: children's radio, short stories, theater and music. Most of his stories and songs took place in an environment similar to the rural village where he grew up.

In 1945 he debuted with Dørstokken heme, a collection of short stories. His only novel Trost i taklampa (1950) was a success both as a book and as a play. He was frequently featured on radio and television programs during the 1950s and 1960s. Prøysen was awarded the Norwegian Cultural Council Honorary Prize (Norsk kulturråds ærespris) in 1970.

A large part of Prøysen's writing consisted of short stories. Much of his production was made for children. The first stories about Teskjekjerringa were published in the magazine Kooperatøren. In 1956 the first book of a series about Teskedsgumman was published. From 1967, Swedish television featured a popular series. In the 1980s, a Japanese cartoon series for 130 episodes was made. Teskjekjerringa was published in the Penguin Books classic series becoming an international success.

== Selected works ==
- Dørstokken heme, Hedmarksfortellinger (1945)
- Trost i taklampa (1950)
- Utpå livets vei (1952)
- Matja Madonna (1955)
- Kjærlighet på rundpinne (1958)
- Muntre minner fra Hedemarken (1959)
- Det var da det og itte nå (1971)

== Teskjekjerringa series ==
- 1960 – Teskjekjerringa på nye eventyr
- 1965 – Teskjekjerringa i eventyrskauen
- 1967 – Teskjekjerringa på camping
- 1970 – Teskjekjerringa på julehandel
- 1989 – Teskjekjerringa på blåbærtur
- 1990 – Teskjekjerringa og elgen
- 1991 – Teskjekjerringa og den skjulte skatten
- 1992 – Teskjekjerringa på basar

== Personal life ==
He married Else Storhaug (1916–2015) in 1948. They had two children; a daughter Elin Julie (born 1949) and a son Alf Ketil (born 1951). Alf Prøysen died of cancer at age 56. He was buried at Vår Frelsers gravlund in Oslo.

Several biographies have been written about Alf Prøysen including a book by his daughter Elin Prøysen as well as works by Helge Hagen and Dag Solberg. A book by Ove Røsbak appeared during 1992. Røsbak also wrote an article in Dagbladet stating that several of his sources confirmed that Prøysen had discussed his bisexuality during the 1960s.

In Samtiden; nr 2, 2007 Dagbladet also had an interview with gay activist Karen-Christine Friele in which she confirmed that Prøysen had told her about his love of men and his divided life. Dagbladet editor Knut Olav Åmås commented later that the resulting debate revealed mixed feelings towards gay/bisexuality.

== Prøysenhuset ==
Prøysenhuset is a cultural center and museum located at Rudshøgda in Ringsaker. The center has an auditorium, gift shop, café and play ground. The main part of the museum is a permanent exhibition that tells of the life and career of Alf Prøysen. It was designed by the architectural and engineering firm Snøhetta. The center was established as a gift to Ringsaker municipality on the 100th anniversary of his birth in July 2014.

It was financed by businessman and investor Arthur Buchardt. Local companies also gathered to fund the center. It now operates as a department under the Cultural Office of the municipality of Ringsaker.

== Other sources ==
- Fyksen, Bjørn Ivar (2013). Alminnelige arbesfolk om Alf Prøysens prosaforfatterskap. Oplandske bokforl. ISBN 9788275182164.
- Hagen, Helge; Solberg, Dag (1984). Med en fiol bak øret. En Bok Om Alf Prøysen. Tiden Norsk Forlag. ISBN 9788210025808.
- Røsbak, Ove (1992). Alf Prøysen: Præstvægen og sjustjerna. Gyldendal Norsk Forlag. ISBN 978-8205209558.
- Lassen-Seger, Maria (2014). Empowering Transformations: Mrs Pepperpot Revisited. Cambridge Scholars Publishing. ISBN 978-1443856997.
- Tinholt, Elin (2004). Prøysen: ti stemmer om vennskap og viser. N. W. Damm & Søn. ISBN 9788204098894.
- Prøysen, Elin (2004). Alf Prøysen. Gyldendal Norsk Forlag AS. ISBN 82-05-32717-3.
- Imerslund, Knut (2004). Alf Prøysen i nytt lys. Oplandske bokforl. ISBN 9788275181150.

Awards
Preceded by Hans Peter L'Orange	Recipient of the Norsk kulturråds ærespris 1970	Succeeded by Alf Rolfsen
