= Jan Erik Düring =

Norwegian film director

- Born: 15 June 1926; Bærum, Norway
- Died: 13 March 2014 (aged 87)
- Occupation: Film director

Jan Erik Düring (15 June 1926 – 13 March 2014) was a Norwegian film director. He was born in Bærum. Among his films are Hjelp - vi får leilighet! (1965), Lucie (1979), the musical Bør Børson Jr. from 1974, and the comedy Deilig er fjorden! from 1985.

Düring also chaired the trade union Norsk Filmforbund.
