= The Great Highway =

Play written by August Strindberg

The Great Highway (Swedish: Stora landsvägen) is the last play by Swedish playwright August Strindberg. The original title is Stora landsvägen. Structured as a journey play in seven stages, it is an allegory of the individual's passage through life.

== History ==
When Strindberg wrote this play, he was already suffering from the stomach cancer that would kill him three years later, and he intended it as a summation of his thoughts on various questions, a kind of theatrical self-portrait and last testament. A literal translation of the Swedish title would be "The Great Country Road", and Strindberg intended this to reference the street where he had lived as a child, which led directly to the cemetery.

The world premiere of the play took place on February 19, 1910, at the Intimate Theater of Stockholm with August Falck in the lead role of the Hunter. It was not the kind of play the public associated with Strindberg and it closed after a comparatively short run (16 performances according to Strindberg, Théâtre Complet 6, Paris 1986, p. 538). It was considered unperformable for decades afterwards and is still produced only rarely.

== Synopsis ==
The Great Highway is a memory play structured as a journey with seven 'stations' at which the protagonist, the Hunter, encounters and re-encounters other characters. Like the Hunter, all the other characters are symbolically named and include the Hermit, the Traveller, a group of Millers, the Girl, the Schoolmaster, the Blacksmith, the Photographer, the Organ-Grinder, the Japanese, the Murderer, the Child, the Woman, and the Tempter.

As the Hunter proceeds on a walking tour in the mountains, he finds himself in one surreal situation after another. For example, the Millers he meets are fighting over the wind; elsewhere the Schoolmaster lives in the town of Eseldorf (Donkey Village) where being sane is a crime punishable by death. As the Hunter descends from the purer heights of the mountains, he begins to encounter characters from his own past, including the daughter he deserted.

The play is written chiefly in unrhymed verse, with the language veering frequently from the banal to the lyrical. The past tense recurs repeatedly in the characters' speech. It ends with an admission of failure and a prayer:

Bless me, whose deepest suffering,
deepest of human suffering, was this—
I could not be the one I longed to be.

Critics' views of the play vary a great deal. Many consider it a masterpiece of emotional truth-telling despite flaws like its unusual mixture of mundane and sublime language. However, some have dismissed it for being undramatic or as pseudo-mystical claptrap.
