= Master Olof =

Play written by August Strindberg

Master Olof (Swedish: Mäster Olof) is a historical drama in five acts by the Swedish playwright August Strindberg. The story is about the reformer Olaus Petri's struggle against the Roman Catholic Church in the 16th century. First written in 1872, Strindberg rewrote it many times in both prose and verse.

Master Olof

Ludvig Josephson (the new artistic director of Stockholm's New Theatre) agreed to stage Master Olof, eventually opting for the prose version—the five-hour-long première opened on 30 December 1881 under the direction of August Lindberg to favourable reviews. This production represented Strindberg's breakthrough in the theatre.

== Sources ==
- Lane, Harry. 1998. "Strindberg, August." In The Cambridge Guide to Theatre. Ed. Martin Banham. Cambridge: Cambridge UP. 1040-1041. ISBN 0-521-43437-8.
- Meyer, Michael. 1985. Strindberg: A Biography. Oxford Lives ser. Oxford: Oxford UP, 1987. ISBN 0-19-281995-X.
