= August Strindberg =

Swedish writer and painter (1849–1912)

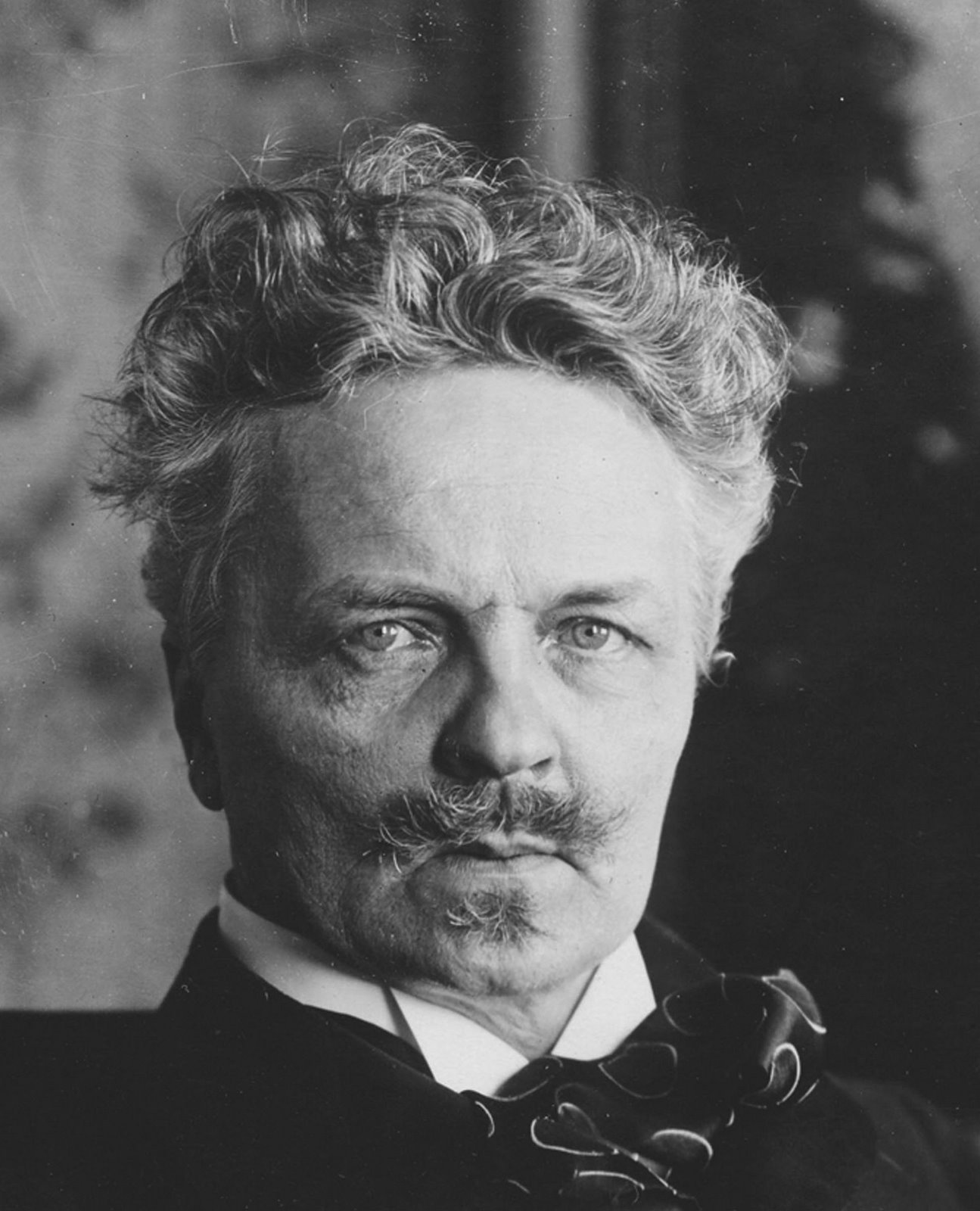
- August Strindberg
- Born: Johan August Strindberg; 22 January 1849; Stockholm, Sweden
- Died: 14 May 1912 (aged 63); Stockholm, Sweden
- Resting place: Norra begravningsplatsen
- Occupations: Playwright; Novelist; Essayist; Poet; Painter
- Spouses: Siri von Essen (1877–1891); Frida Uhl (1893–1895); Harriet Bosse (1901–1904)
- Children: 7, including Friedrich Strindberg and Karin Smirnov
- Writing career
- Period: Modernism
- Notable works: The Red Room (1879); The Father (1887); Miss Julie (1888); Creditors (1889); Inferno (1897); To Damascus (1898); The Dance of Death (1900); A Dream Play (1902); The Ghost Sonata (1908)
- Movements: Naturalism; Expressionism; Chamber play

Johan August Strindberg (/ˈstrɪn(d)bɜːrɡ/; Swedish: [ˈǒːɡɵst ˈstrɪ̂nːdbærj]; 22 January 1849 – 14 May 1912) was a Swedish playwright, novelist, poet, essayist, and painter. A prolific writer who often drew directly on his personal experience, Strindberg wrote more than 60 plays and more than 30 works of fiction, autobiography, history, cultural analysis, and politics during his career, which spanned four decades. A bold experimenter and iconoclast throughout his life, he explored a wide range of dramatic methods and purposes, from naturalistic tragedy, monodrama, and historical plays to his anticipations of expressionist and surrealist dramatic techniques. From his earliest work, Strindberg developed innovative forms of dramatic action, language, and visual composition. He is considered the "father" of modern Swedish literature and his The Red Room (1879) has frequently been described as the first modern Swedish novel. In Sweden, Strindberg is known as an essayist, painter, poet, and especially novelist and playwright, but in other countries he is known mostly as a playwright.

The Royal Theatre rejected his first major play, Master Olof, in 1872; it was not until 1881, when he was thirty-two, that its première at the New Theatre gave him his theatrical breakthrough. In his plays The Father (1887), Miss Julie (1888), and Creditors (1889), he created naturalistic dramas that – building on the established accomplishments of Henrik Ibsen's prose problem plays while rejecting their use of the structure of the well-made play – responded to the call-to-arms of Émile Zola's manifesto "Naturalism in the Theatre" (1881) and the example set by André Antoine's newly established Théâtre Libre (opened 1887). In Miss Julie, characterisation replaces plot as the predominant dramatic element (in contrast to melodrama and the well-made play) and the determining role of heredity and the environment on the "vacillating, disintegrated" characters is emphasized. Strindberg modeled his short-lived Scandinavian Experimental Theatre (1889) in Copenhagen on Antoine's theatre and he explored the theory of Naturalism in his essays "On Psychic Murder" (1887), "On Modern Drama and the Modern Theatre" (1889), and a preface to Miss Julie, the last of which is probably the best-known statement of the principles of the theatrical movement.

During the 1890s he spent significant time abroad engaged in scientific experiments and studies of the occult. A series of apparent psychotic attacks between 1894 and 1896 (referred to as his "Inferno crisis") led to his hospitalization and return to Sweden. Under the influence of the ideas of Emanuel Swedenborg, he resolved after his recovery to become "the Zola of the Occult". In 1898 he returned to play-writing with To Damascus, which, like The Great Highway (1909), is a dream-play of spiritual pilgrimage. His A Dream Play (1902) – with its radical attempt to dramatize the workings of the unconscious by means of an abolition of conventional dramatic time and space and the splitting, doubling, merging, and multiplication of its characters – was an important precursor to both expressionism and surrealism. He also returned to writing historical drama, the genre with which he had begun his play-writing career. He helped to run the Intimate Theatre from 1907, a small-scale theatre in Stockholm, modeled on Max Reinhardt's Kammerspielhaus, that staged his chamber plays (such as The Ghost Sonata).

== Biography ==
=== Youth ===
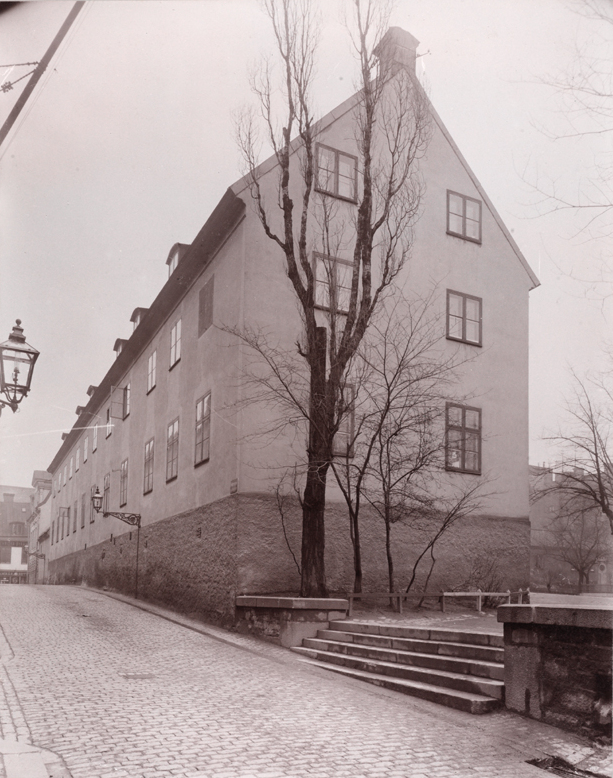
The school in Klara, Stockholm, whose harsh discipline haunted Strindberg in his adult life

Strindberg was born on 22 January 1849 in Stockholm, Sweden, the third surviving son of Carl Oscar Strindberg (a shipping agent) and Eleonora Ulrika Norling (a serving-maid). In his autobiographical novel The Son of a Servant, Strindberg describes a childhood affected by "emotional insecurity, poverty, religious fanaticism and neglect". When he was seven, the family moved to Norrtullsgatan on the northern, almost-rural, periphery of the city. A year later they moved near Sabbatsberg, where they stayed for three years before returning to Norrtullsgatan. He attended a harsh school in Klara for four years, an experience that haunted him in his adult life. He was moved to the school in Jakob in 1860, which he found far more pleasant, though he remained there for only a year. In the autumn of 1861, he was moved to the Stockholm Lyceum, a progressive private school for middle-class boys, where he remained for six years. As a child he had a keen interest in natural science, photography, and religion (following his mother's Pietism). His mother, Strindberg recalled later with bitterness, always resented her son's intelligence. She died when he was 13, and although his grief lasted for only three months, in later life he came to feel a sense of loss and longing for an idealized maternal figure. Less than a year after her death, his father married the children's governess, Emilia Charlotta Pettersson. According to his sisters, Strindberg came to regard them as his worst enemies. He passed his graduation examination in May 1867 and enrolled at the Uppsala University, where he began on 13 September.

Strindberg spent the next few years in Uppsala and Stockholm, alternately studying for examinations and trying his hand at non-academic pursuits. As a young student, Strindberg also worked as an assistant in a pharmacy in the university town of Lund in southern Sweden. He supported himself in between studies as a substitute primary-school teacher and as a tutor for the children of two well-known physicians in Stockholm. He first left Uppsala in 1868 to work as a schoolteacher, but then studied chemistry for some time at the Institute of Technology in Stockholm in preparation for medical studies, later working as a private tutor before becoming an extra at the Royal Theatre in Stockholm. In May 1869, he failed his qualifying chemistry examination which in turn made him uninterested in schooling.

=== 1870s ===
Strindberg returned to Uppsala University in January 1870 to study aesthetics and modern languages and to work on a number of plays. It was at this time that he first learnt about the ideas of Charles Darwin. He co-founded the Rune Society, a small literary club whose members adopted pseudonyms taken from runes of the ancient Teutonic alphabet – Strindberg called himself Frö (Seed), after the god of fertility. After abandoning a draft of a play about Eric XIV of Sweden halfway through in the face of criticism from the Rune Society, on 30 March he completed a one-act comedy in verse called In Rome about Bertel Thorvaldsen, which he had begun the previous autumn. The play was accepted by the Royal Theatre, where it premièred on 13 September 1870. As he watched it performed, he realised that it was not good and felt like drowning himself, though the reviews published the following day were generally favourable. That year he also first read works of Søren Kierkegaard and Georg Brandes, both of whom influenced him.

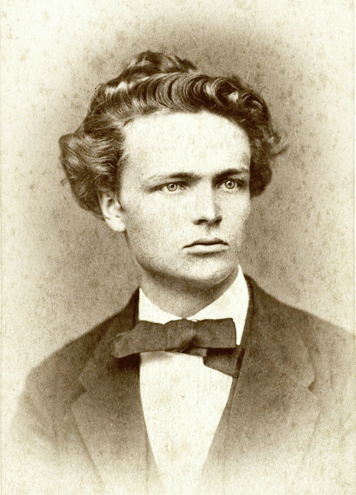
Portrait of Strindberg in 1874, age 25

Taking his cue from William Shakespeare, he began to use colloquial and realistic speech in his historical dramas, which challenged the convention that they should be written in stately verse. During the Christmas holiday of 1870–71, he rewrote a historical tragedy, Sven the Sacrificer, as a one-act play in prose called The Outlaw. Depressed by Uppsala, he stayed in Stockholm, returning to the university in April to pass an exam in Latin and in June to defend his thesis on Adam Gottlob Oehlenschläger's Romantic tragedy Earl Haakon (1802). Following further revision in the summer, The Outlaw opened at the Royal Theatre on 16 October 1871. Despite hostile reviews, the play earned him an audience with King Charles XV, who supported his studies with a payment of 200 riksdaler. Towards the end of the year Strindberg completed a first draft of his first major work, a play about Olaus Petri called Master Olof. In September 1872, the Royal Theatre rejected it, leading to decades of rewrites, bitterness, and a contempt for official institutions. Returning to the university for what would be his final term in the spring, he left on 2 March 1872, without graduating. In Town and Gown (1877), a collection of short stories describing student life, he ridiculed Uppsala and its professors.

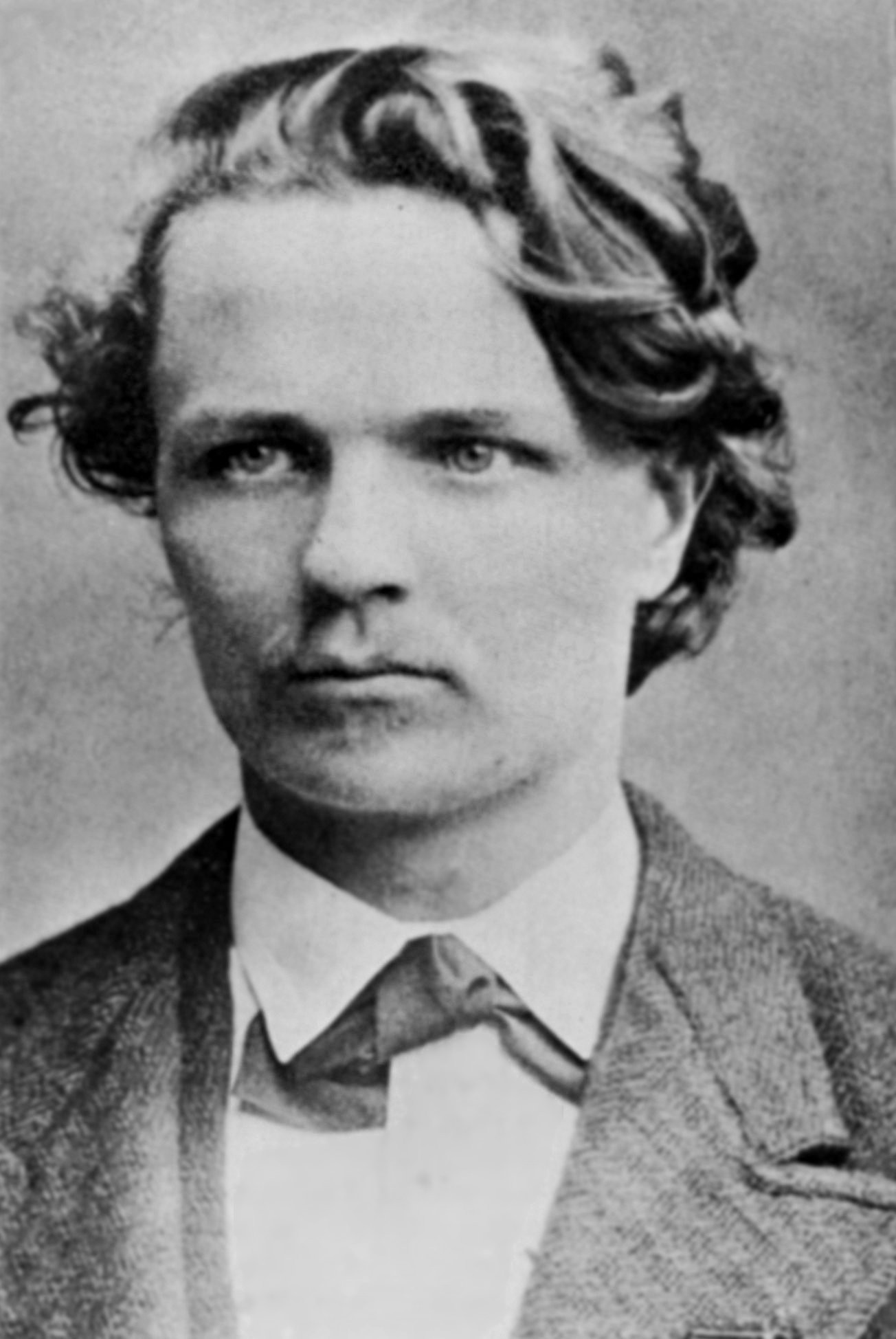
Strindberg, 1875.

Strindberg embarked on his career as a journalist and critic for newspapers in Stockholm. He was particularly excited at this time by Henry Thomas Buckle's History of Civilization and the first volume of Georg Brandes' Main Currents of Nineteenth-Century Literature. From December 1874, Strindberg worked for eight years as an assistant librarian at the Royal Library. That same month, Strindberg offered Master Olof to Edvard Stjernström (the director of the newly built New Theatre in Stockholm), but it was rejected. He socialised with writers, painters, journalists, and other librarians; they often met in the Red Room in Bern's Restaurant.

Early in the summer of 1875, he met Siri von Essen, a 24-year-old aspiring actress who, by virtue of her husband, was a baroness – he became infatuated with her. Strindberg described himself as a "failed author" at this time: "I feel like a deaf-mute," he wrote, "as I cannot speak and am not permitted to write; sometimes I stand in the middle of my room that seems like a prison cell, and then I want to scream so that walls and ceilings would fly apart, and I have so much to scream about, and therefore I remain silent." As a result of an argument in January 1876 concerning the inheritance of the family firm, Strindberg's relationship with his father was terminated (he did not attend his funeral in February 1883). From the beginning of 1876, Strindberg and Siri began to meet in secret, and that same year Siri and her husband divorced. Following a successful audition that December, Siri became an actress at the Royal Theatre. They married a year later, on 30 December 1877; Siri was seven months pregnant at the time. Their first child was born prematurely on 21 January 1878 and died two days later. On 9 January 1879, Strindberg was declared bankrupt. In November 1879, his novel The Red Room was published. A satire of Stockholm society, it has frequently been described as the first modern Swedish novel. While receiving mixed reviews in Sweden, it was acclaimed in Denmark, where Strindberg was hailed as a genius. As a result of The Red Room, he had become famous throughout Scandinavia. Edvard Brandes wrote that the novel "makes the reader want to join the fight against hypocrisy and reaction." In his response to Brandes, Strindberg explained that:

I am a socialist, a nihilist, a republican, anything that is anti-reactionary!... I want to turn everything upside down to see what lies beneath; I believe we are so webbed, so horribly regimented, that no spring-cleaning is possible, everything must be burned, blown to bits, and then we can start afresh...

=== 1880s ===
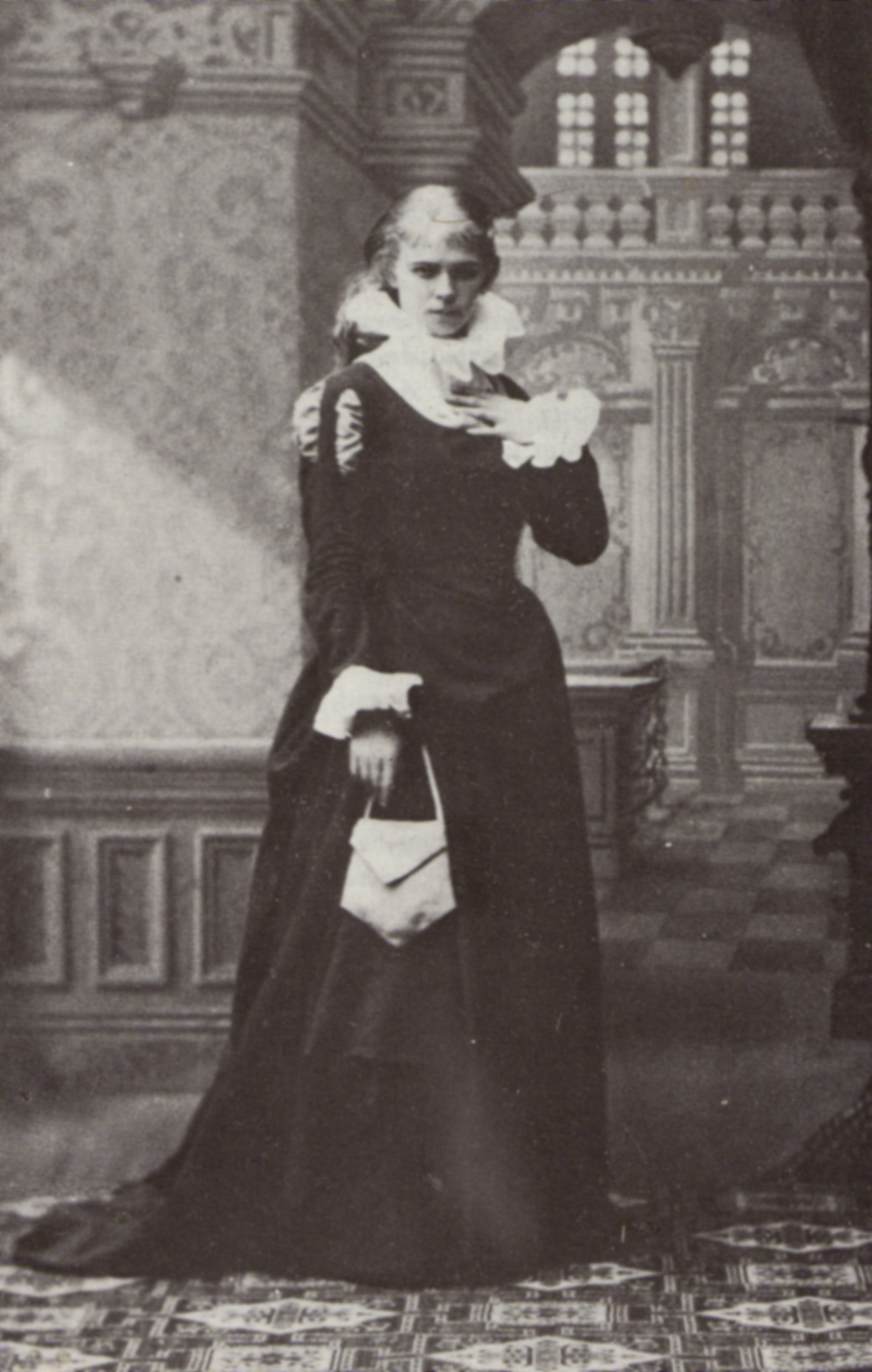
Strindberg's first wife, Siri von Essen, as Margit in Sir Bengt's Wife (1882) at the New Theatre.

Strindberg and Siri's daughter Karin was born on 26 February 1880. Buoyant from the reception of The Red Room, Strindberg swiftly completed The Secret of the Guild ("Gillets hemlighet"), an historical drama set in Uppsala at the beginning of the 15th century about the conflict between two masons over the completion of the city cathedral, which opened at the Royal Theatre on 3 May 1880 (his first première in nine years); Siri played the "staunchly loyal" Margaretha. That spring he formed a friendship with the painter Carl Larsson. A collected edition of all of Strindberg's previous writings was published under the title Spring Harvest. From 1881, at the invitation of Edvard Brandes, Strindberg began to contribute articles to the Morgenbladet, a Copenhagen daily newspaper. In April he began work on The Swedish People, a four-part cultural history of Sweden written as a series of depictions of ordinary people's lives from the 9th century onwards, which he undertook mainly for financial reasons and which absorbed him for the next year; Larsson provided illustrations. At Strindberg's insistence, Siri resigned from the Royal Theatre in the spring, having become pregnant again. Their second daughter, Greta, was born on 9 June 1881, while they were staying on the island of Kymmendö. That month, a collection of essays from the past 10 years, Studies in Cultural History, was published. Ludvig Josephson (the new artistic director of Stockholm's New Theatre) agreed to stage Master Olof, eventually opting for the prose version – the five-hour-long production opened on 30 December 1881 under the direction of August Lindberg to favourable reviews. While this production of Master Olof was his breakthrough in the theatre, Strindberg's five-act fairy-tale play Lucky Peter's Journey, which opened on 22 December 1883, brought him his first significant success, although he dismissed it as a potboiler. In March 1882 he wrote in a letter to Josephson: "My interest in the theatre, I must frankly state, has but one focus and one goal – my wife's career as an actress"; Josephson duly cast her in two roles the following season.

Having returned to Kymmendö during the summer of 1882, Strindberg wrote a collection of anti-establishment short stories, The New Kingdom. While there, to provide a lead role for his wife and as a reply to Henrik Ibsen's A Doll's House (1879), he also wrote Sir Bengt's Wife, which opened on 25 November 1882 at the New Theatre. He moved to Grez-sur-Loing, just south of Paris, France, where Larsson was staying. He then moved to Paris, which they found noisy and polluted. Income earned from Lucky Peter's Journey enabled him to move to Switzerland in 1883. He resided in Ouchy, where he stayed for some years. On 3 April 1884, Siri gave birth to their son, Hans.

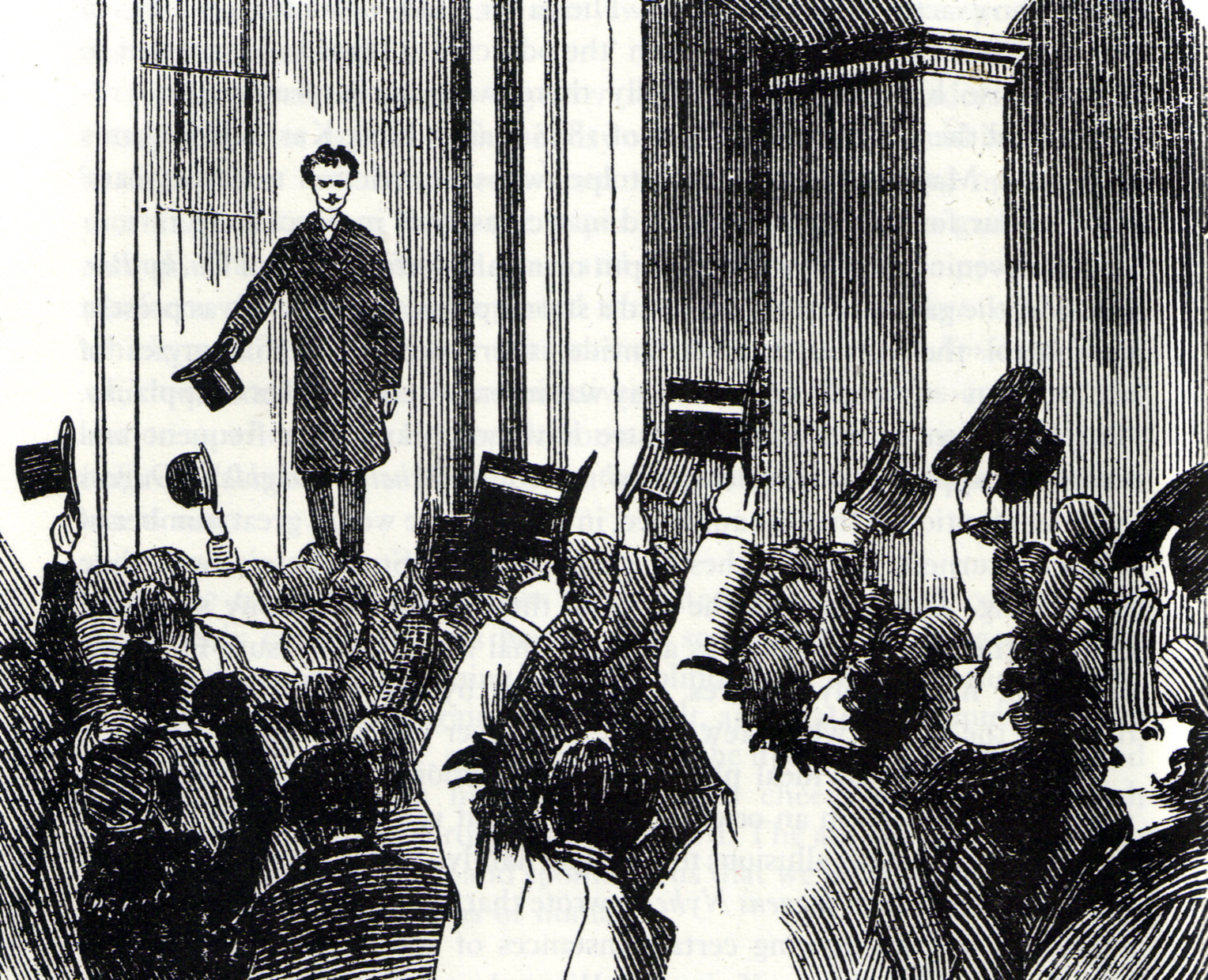
Newspaper illustration of Strindberg's reception on his return to Stockholm on 20 October 1884 to face charges of blasphemy arising from a story in the first volume of his collection Getting Married.

In 1884 Strindberg wrote a collection of short stories, Getting Married, that presented women in an egalitarian light and for which he was tried for and acquitted of blasphemy in Sweden. Two groups "led by influential members of the upper classes, supported by the right-wing press" probably instigated the prosecution; at the time, most people in Stockholm thought that Queen Sophia was behind it. By the end of that year Strindberg was in a despondent mood: "My view now is," he wrote, "everything is shit. No way out. The skein is too tangled to be unravelled. It can only be sheared. The building is too solid to be pulled down. It can only be blown up." In May 1885 he wrote: "I am on my way to becoming an atheist." In the wake of the publication of Getting Married, he began to correspond with Émile Zola. During the summer he completed a sequel volume of stories, though some were quite different in tone from those of the first. Another collection of stories, Utopias in Reality, was published in September 1885, though it was not well received.

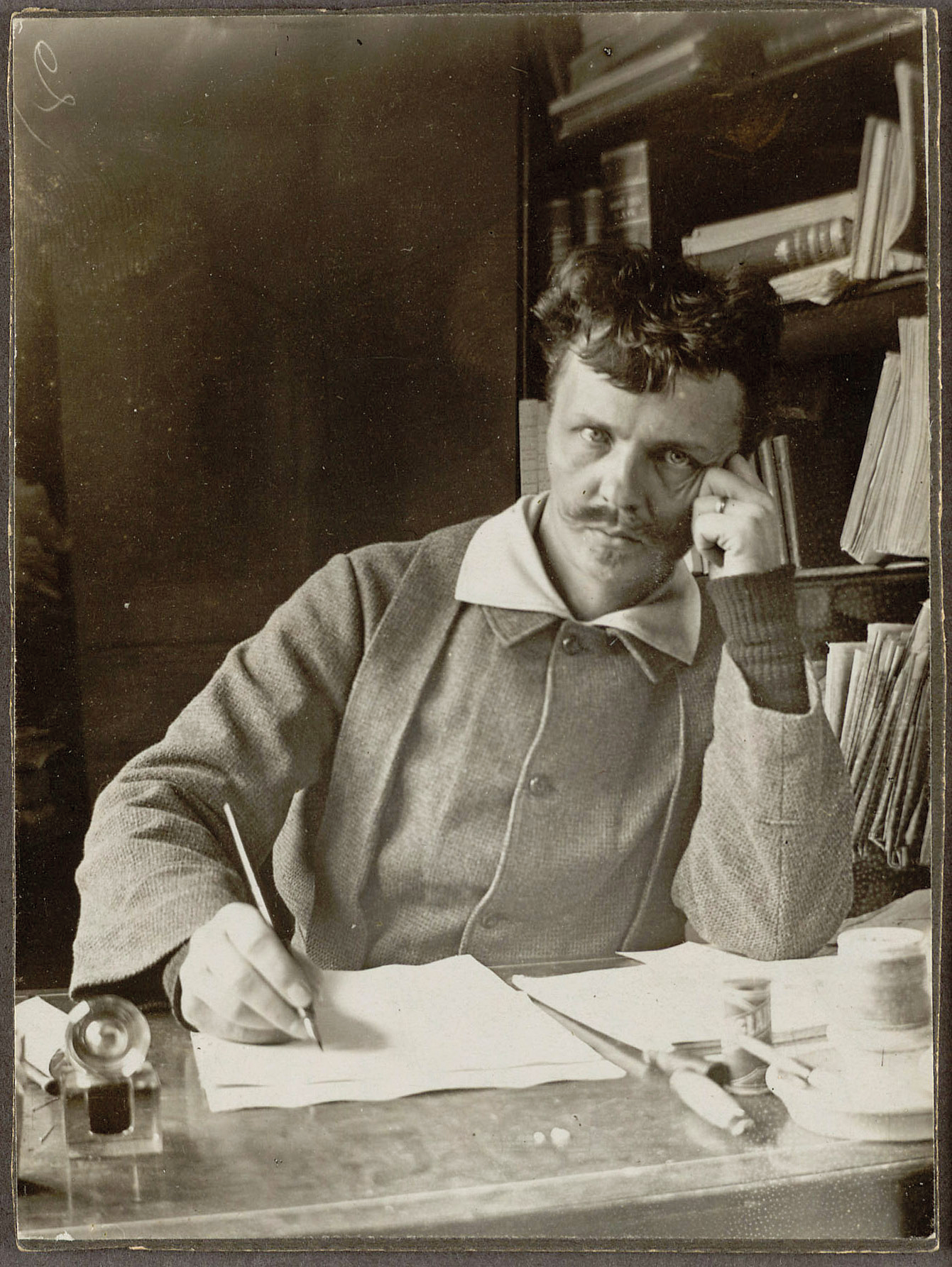
Strindberg, 1886.

In 1885, they moved back to Paris. In September 1887 he began to write a novel in French about his relationship with Siri von Essen called The Defence of a Fool. In 1887, they moved to Issigatsbühl, near Lindau by Lake Constance. His next play, Comrades (1886), was his first in a contemporary setting. After the trial he evaluated his religious beliefs, and concluded that he needed to leave Lutheranism, though he had been Lutheran since childhood; and after briefly being a deist, he became an atheist. He needed a credo and he used Jean-Jacques Rousseau nature worshiping, which he had studied while a student, as one. His works The People of Hemsö (1887) and Among French Peasants (1889) were influenced by his study of Rousseau. He then moved to Germany, where he fell in love with Chancellor Otto von Bismarck's Prussia status of the officer corps. After that, he grew very critical of Rousseau and turned to Friedrich Nietzsche's philosophies, which emphasized the male intellect. Nietzsche's influence can be seen in The Defence of a Fool (1893), Pariah (1889), Creditors (1889), and By the Open Sea (1890).

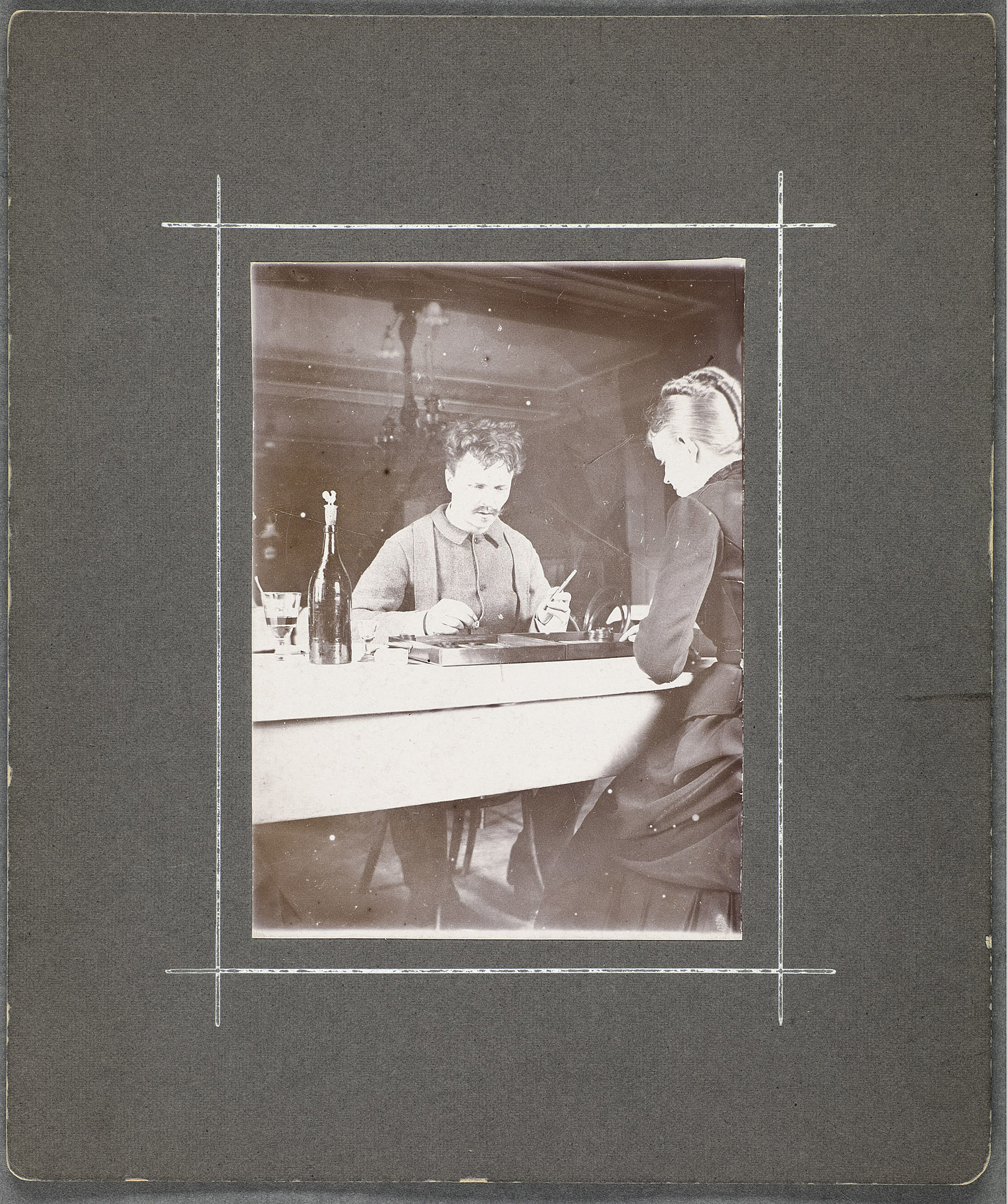
Strindberg and Siri von Essen, 1886.

Another change in his life after the trial is that Strindberg decided he wanted a scientific life instead of a literary one, and began to write about non-literary subjects. When he was 37, he began The Son of a Servant, a four-part autobiography. The first part ends in 1867, the year he left home for Uppsala. Part two describes his youth up to 1872. Part three, or The Red Room, describes his years as a poet and journalist; it ends with his meeting Siri von Essen. Part four, which dealt with the years from 1877 to 1886, was banned by his publishers and was not published until after his death. The three missing years, 1875–1877, were the time when Strindberg was wooing von Essen and their marriage; entitled He and She, this portion of his autobiography was not printed until 1919, after his death. It contains the love letters between the two during that period.

In the later half of the 1880s Strindberg discovered Naturalism. After completing The Father in a matter of weeks, he sent a copy to Émile Zola for his approval, though Zola's reaction was lukewarm. The drama revolves around the conflict between the Captain, a father, husband, and scientist, and his wife, Laura, over the education of their only child, a fourteen-year-old daughter named Berta. Through unscrupulous means, Laura gets the Captain to doubt his fatherhood until he suffers a mental and physical collapse. While writing The Father, Strindberg himself was experiencing marital problems and doubted the paternity of his children. He also suspected that Ibsen had based Hjalmar Ekdal in The Wild Duck (1884) on Strindberg because he felt that Ibsen viewed him as a weak and pathetic husband; he reworked the situation of Ibsen's play into a warfare between the two sexes. From November 1887 to April 1889, Strindberg stayed in Copenhagen. While there he had several opportunities to meet with both Georg Brandes and his brother Edvard Brandes. Georg helped him put on The Father, which had its première on 14 November 1887 at the Casino Theatre in Copenhagen. It enjoyed a successful run for 11 days after which it toured the Danish provinces.

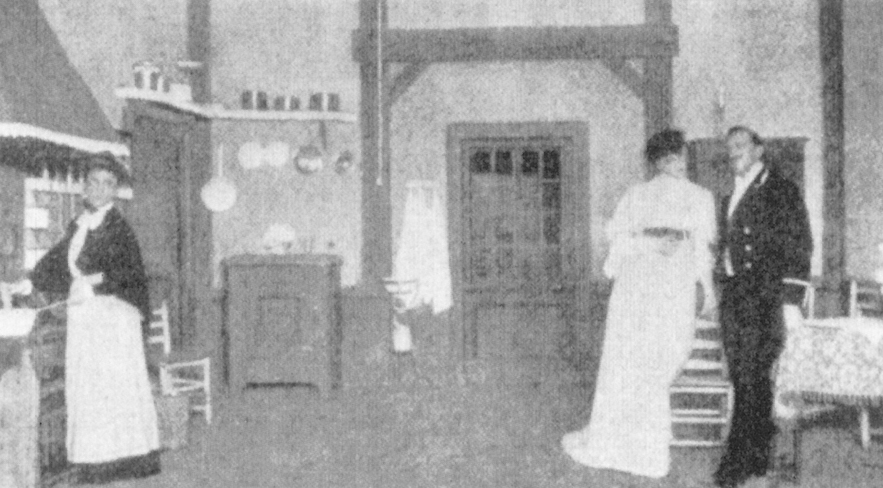
First Stockholm production of Strindberg's 1888 naturalistic play Miss Julie, staged at The People's Theatre in November 1906. Sacha Sjöström (left) as Kristin, Manda Björling as Miss Julie, and August Falck as Jean.

Before writing Creditors, Strindberg completed one of his most famous pieces, Miss Julie. He wrote the play with a Parisian stage in mind, in particular the Théâtre Libre, founded in 1887 by André Antoine. In the play he used Charles Darwin's theory of survival of the fittest and dramatized a doomed sexual encounter that crosses the division of social classes. It is believed that this play was inspired by the marriage of Strindberg, the son of a servant, to an aristocratic woman.

In the essay On Psychic Murder (1887), he referred to the psychological theories of the Nancy School, which advocated the use of hypnosis. Strindberg developed a theory that sexual warfare was not motivated by carnal desire but by relentless human will. The winner was the one who had the strongest and most unscrupulous mind, someone who, like a hypnotist, could coerce a more impressionable psyche into submission. His view on psychological power struggles may be seen in works such as Creditors (1889), The Stronger (1889), and Pariah (1889).

In 1888, after a separation and reconciliation with Siri von Essen, he founded the Scandinavian Experimental Theatre in Copenhagen, where Siri became manager. He asked writers to send him scripts, which he received from Herman Bang, Gustav Wied and Nathalia Larsen. Less than a year later, with the theatre and reconciliation short lived, he moved back to Sweden while Siri moved back to her native Finland with the children. While there, he rode out the final phase of the divorce and later used this agonizing ordeal for the basis of The Bond and the Link (1893). Strindberg also became interested in short drama, called Quart d'heure. He was inspired by writers such as Gustave Guiche and Henri de Lavedan. His notable contribution was The Stronger (1889). As a result of the failure of the Scandinavian Experimental Theatre, Strindberg did not work as a playwright for three years. In 1889, he published an essay entitled "On Modern Drama and the Modern Theatre", in which he disassociated himself from naturalism, arguing that it was petty and unimaginative realism. His sympathy for Nietzsche's philosophy and atheism in general was also on the wane. He entered the period of his "Inferno crisis", in which he had psychological and religious upheavals that influenced his later works.

August Strindberg's Inferno is his personal account of sinking deeper into some kind of madness, typified by visions and paranoia. In Strindberg och alkoholen (1985), James Spens discusses Strindberg's drinking habits, including his liking for absinthe and its possible implications for Strindberg's mental health during the inferno period.

=== 1890s ===
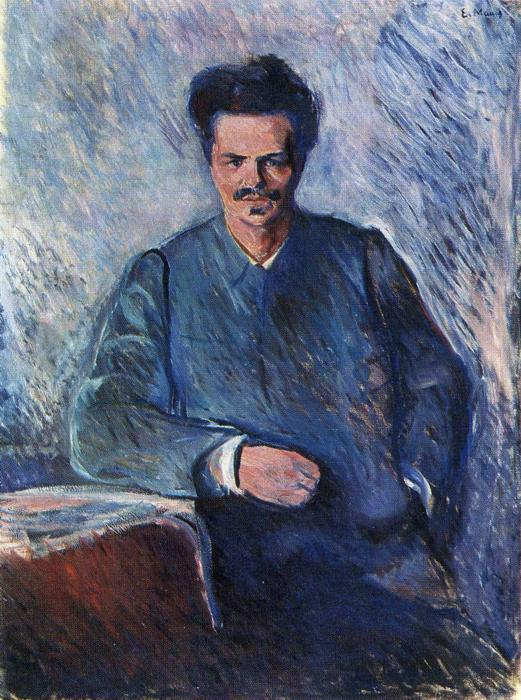
Edvard Munch Portrait of August Strindberg, 1892, Museum of Modern Art, Stockholm, Sweden

On midsummer's day, 1891, while staying with Siri and her close friend, the Danish woman Marie Caroline David, on the island Runmarö, in the Stockholm Archipelago, Strindberg suspected Siri was having a long-term affair with David, and he violently assaulted her, precipitating the end of the marriage.

After his disenchantment with naturalism, Strindberg had a growing interest in transcendental matters. Symbolism was just beginning at this time. Verner von Heidenstam and Ola Hanson had dismissed naturalism as "shoemaker realism" that rendered human experience in simplistic terms. This is believed to have stalled Strindberg's creativity, and Strindberg insisted that he was in a rivalry and forced to defend naturalism, even though he had exhausted its literary potential. These works include: Debit and Credit (1892), Facing Death (1892), Motherly Love (1892), and The First Warning (1893). His play The Keys of Heaven (1892) was inspired by the loss of his children in his divorce. He also completed one of his few comedies, Playing with Fire (1893), and the first two parts of his post-inferno trilogy To Damascus (1898–1904).

In 1892, he experienced writer's block, which led to a drastic reduction in his income. Depression followed as he was unable to meet his financial obligations and to support his children and former wife. A fund was set up through an appeal in a German magazine. This money allowed him to leave Sweden and he joined artistic circles in Berlin. Otto Brahm's Freie Bühne theatre premiered some of his famous works in Germany, including The Father, Miss Julie, and Creditors.

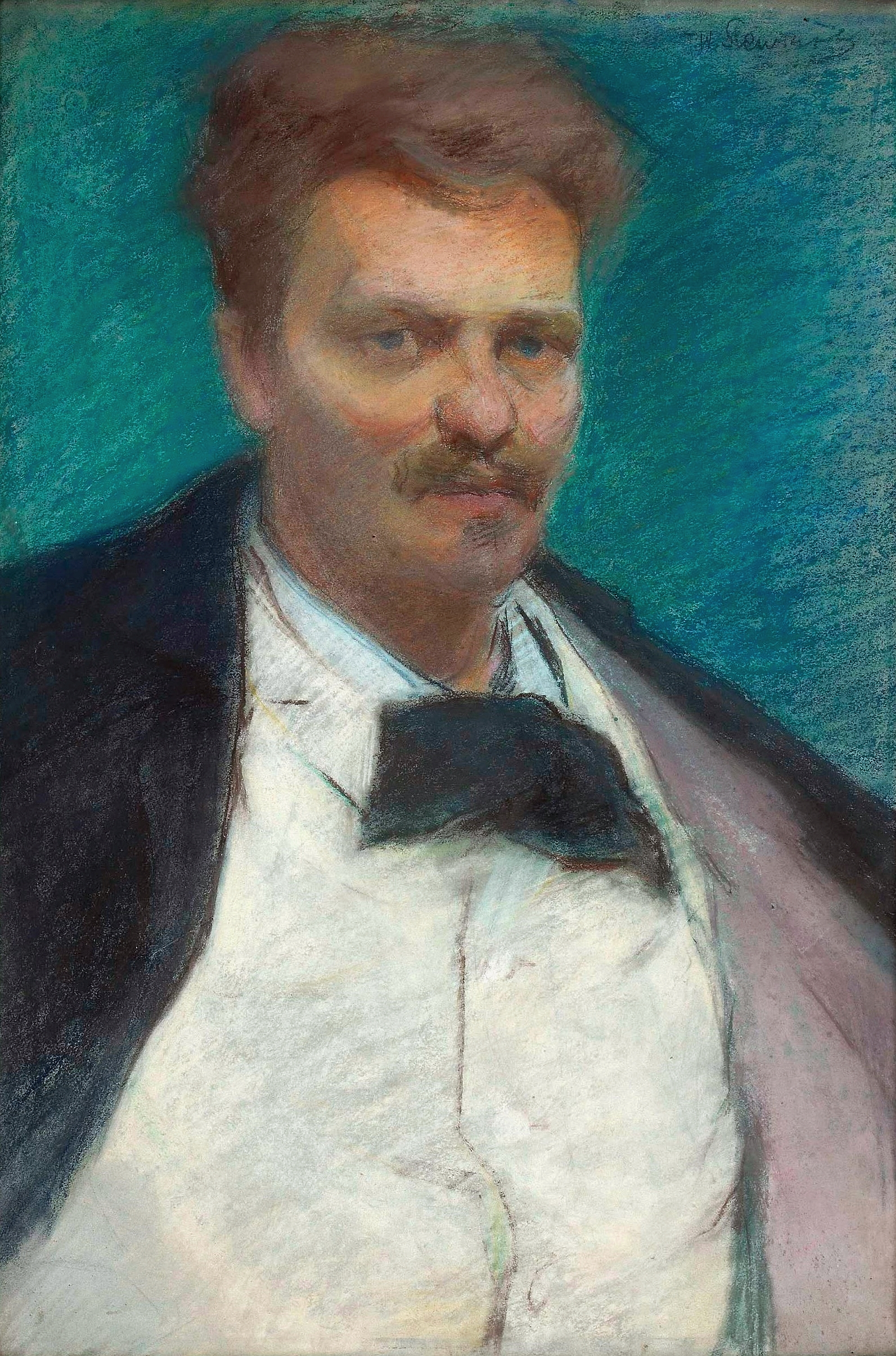
Władysław Ślewiński, Portrait of August Strindberg, 1896, National Museum in Warsaw

Similar to 20 years earlier when he frequented The Red Room, he now went to the German tavern The Black Porker. Here he met a diverse group of artists from Scandinavia, Poland, and Germany. His attention turned to Frida Uhl, who was twenty-three years younger than Strindberg. They were married in 1893. Less than a year later, their daughter Kerstin was born and the couple separated, though their marriage was not officially dissolved until 1897. Frida's family, in particular her mother, who was a devout Catholic, had an important influence on Strindberg, and in an 1894 letter he declared "I feel the hand of our Lord resting over me."

Some critics think that Strindberg suffered from severe paranoia in the mid-1890s, and perhaps that he temporarily experienced insanity. Others, including Evert Sprinchorn and Olof Lagercrantz, believed that he intentionally turned himself into his own guinea pig by doing psychological and drug-induced self-experimentation. He wrote on subjects such as botany, chemistry, and optics before returning to literature with the publication of Inferno (1897), a (half fictionalized) account of his "wilderness years" in Austria and Paris, then a collection of short stories, Legends, and a semi-dramatic novella, Jacob Wrestling (both printed in the same book 1898). Both volumes aroused curiosity and controversy, not least due to the religious element; earlier, Strindberg had been known to be indifferent or hostile to religion and especially priests, but now he had undergone some sort of conversion to a personal faith. In a postscript, he noted the impact of Emanuel Swedenborg on his current work.

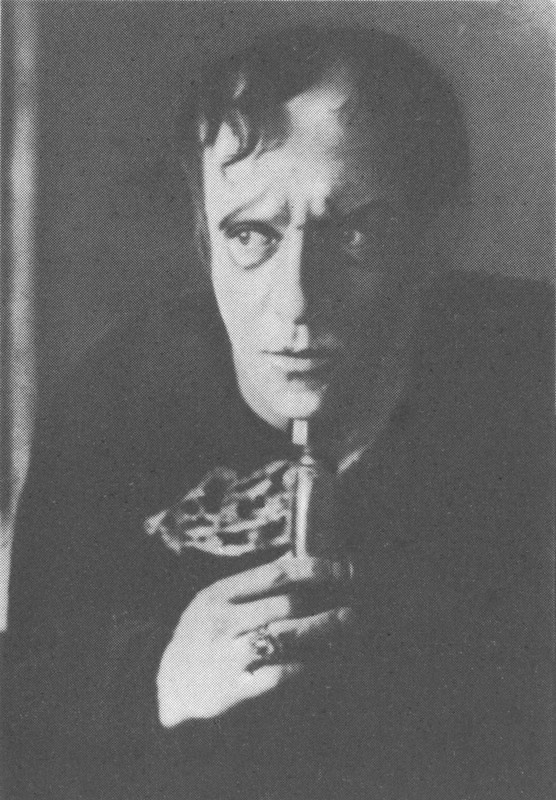
Michael Chekhov as Erik in the Moscow Art Theatre 1921 production of Strindberg's play Erik XIV (1899).

"The Powers" were central to Strindberg's later work. He said that "the Powers" were an outside force that had caused him his physical and mental suffering because they were acting in retribution to humankind for their wrongdoings. As William Blake, Ralph Waldo Emerson, Honoré de Balzac, and William Butler Yeats had been, he was drawn to Swedenborg's mystical visions, with their depictions of spiritual landscape and Christian morality. Strindberg believed for the rest of his life that the relationship between the transcendental and the real world was described by a series of "correspondences" and that everyday events were really messages from above of which only the enlightened could make sense. He also felt that he was chosen by Providence to atone for the moral decay of others and that his tribulations were payback for misdeeds earlier in his life.

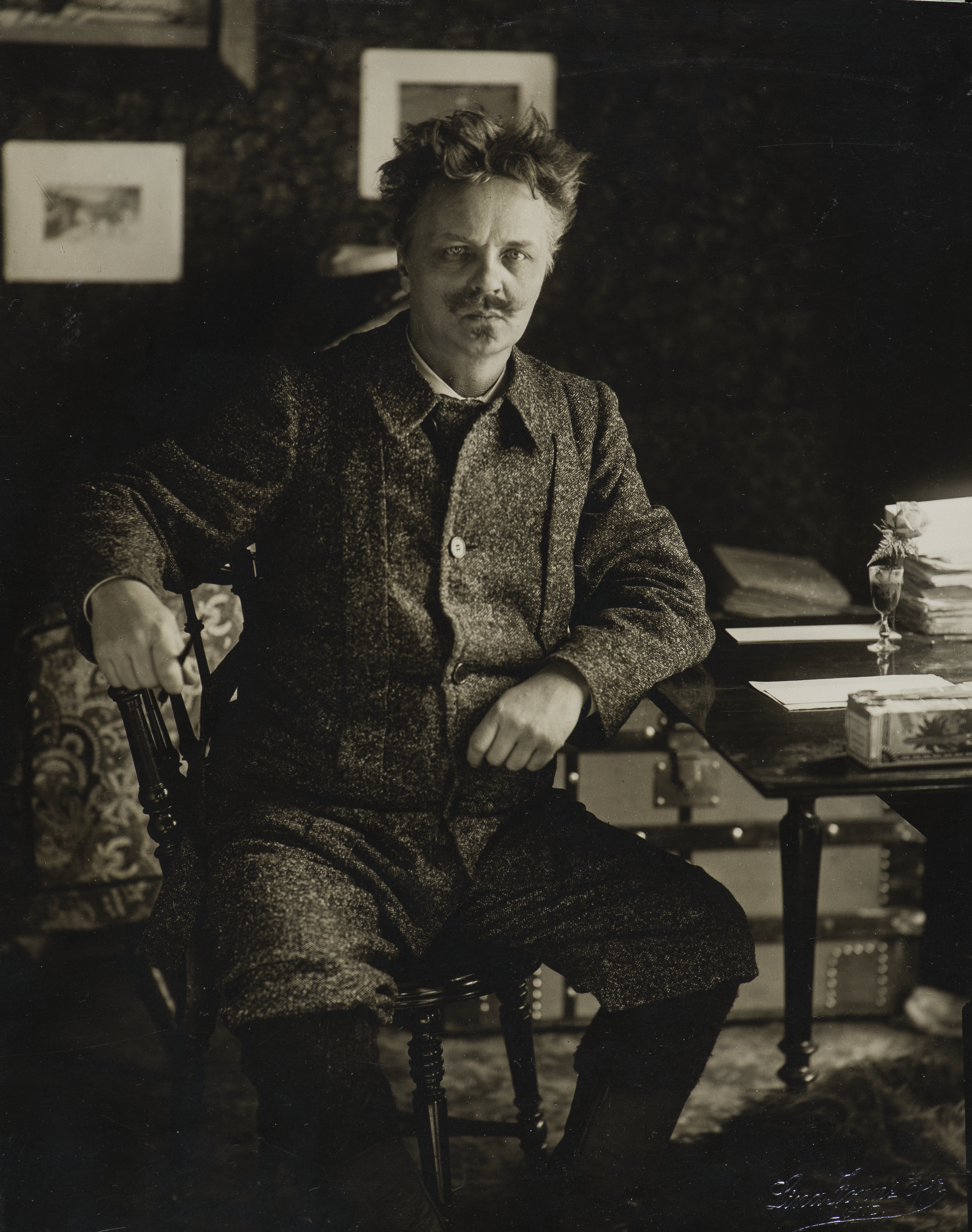
Strindberg in Lund 1897.

Strindberg had spent the tail end of 1896 and most of 1897 in the university town of Lund in southern Sweden, a sojourn during which he made a number of new friendships, felt his mental stability and health improving and also firmly returned to literary writing; Inferno, Legends and Jacob Wrestling were written there. In 1899, he returned permanently to Stockholm, following a successful production there of Master Olof in 1897 (which was re-staged in 1899 to mark Strindberg's fiftieth birthday). He had the desire to become recognized as a leadíng figure in Swedish literature, and to put earlier controversies behind him, and felt that historical dramas were the way to attain that status. Though Strindberg claimed that he was writing "realistically", he freely altered past events and biographical information, and telescoped chronology (as often done in most historical fiction): more importantly, he felt a flow of resurgent inspiration, writing almost twenty new plays (many in a historical setting) between 1898 and 1902. His new works included the so-called Vasa Trilogy: The Saga of the Folkungs (1899), Gustavus Vasa (1899), and Erik XIV (1899) and A Dream Play (written in 1901, first performed in 1907).

=== 1900s ===
Strindberg was pivotal in the creation of chamber plays. Max Reinhardt was a big supporter of his, staging some of his plays at the Kleines Theatre in 1902 (including The Bond, The Stronger, and The Outlaw). Once Otto Brahm relinquished his role as head as of the Deutsches Theatre, Reinhardt took over and produced Strindberg's plays.

In 1903, Strindberg planned to write a grand cycle of plays based on world history, but the idea soon faded. He had completed short plays about Martin Luther, Plato, Moses, Jesus Christ, and Socrates. He wrote another historical drama in 1908 after the Royal Theatre convinced him to put on a new play for its sixtieth birthday. He wrote The Last of the Knights (1908), Earl Birger of Bjälbo (1909), and The Regents (1909).

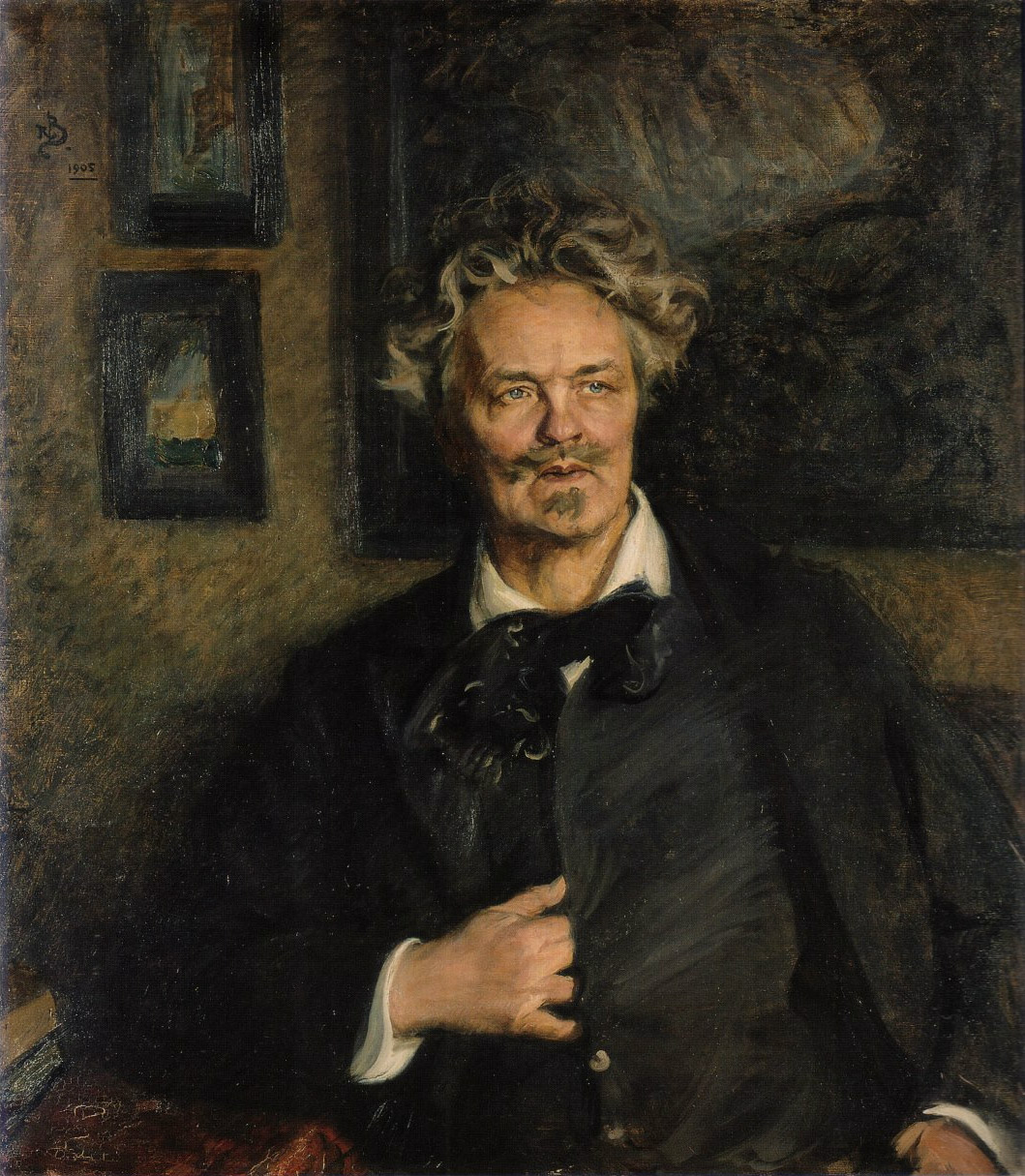
A portrait of August Strindberg by Richard Bergh (1905).

His other works, such as Days of Loneliness (1903), The Roofing Ceremony (1907), and The Scapegoat (1907), and the novels The Gothic Rooms (1904) and Black Banners Genre Scenes from the Turn of the Century, (1907) have been viewed as precursors to Marcel Proust and Franz Kafka.

August Falck, an actor, wanted to put on a production of Miss Julie and wrote to Strindberg for permission. In September 1906 he staged the first Swedish production of Miss Julie. August Falck, played Jean and Manda Bjorling played Julie.

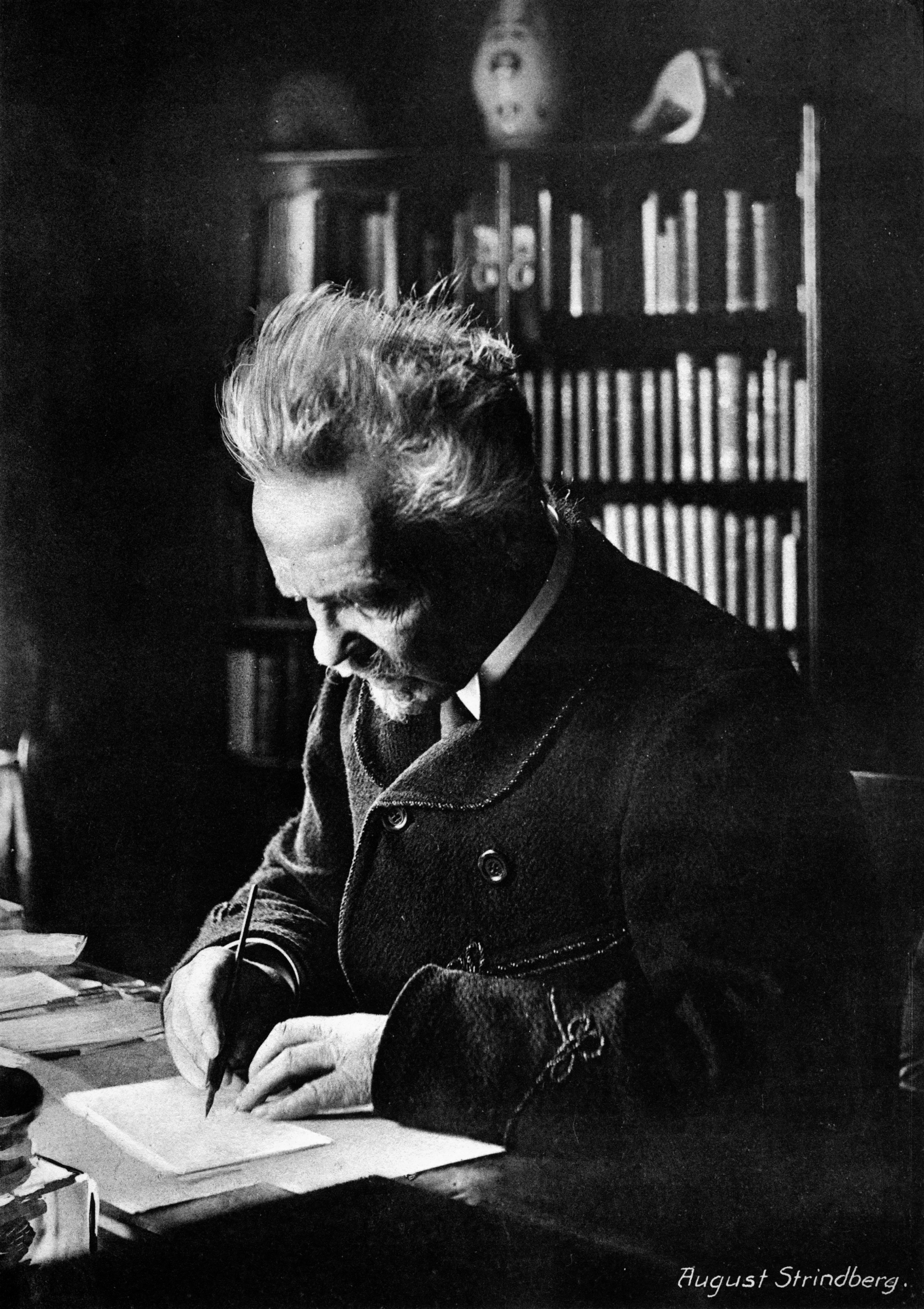

In 1909, Strindberg thought he might get the Nobel Prize in Literature, but instead lost to Selma Lagerlöf, the first woman and first Swede to win the award. The leader of the Social Democrat Youth Alliance started a fund-raiser for a special "people's award". Nathan Söderblom (friend of Strindberg since the mid-90s years in Paris, a prominent theologian and later to become archbishop of Sweden) was noted as a donor, and both he and Strindberg came under attack from circles close to the conservative party and the church. In total 45,000 Swedish crowns were collected, by more than 20,000 donors, most of whom were workers. Albert Bonniers förlag, who had already published much of his work over the years, paid him 200,000 Swedish crowns for the publishing rights to his complete works; the first volumes of the edition would appear in print in 1912, a few months before his death. He invited his first three children (now, like their mother, living in Finland) to Stockholm and divided the money into five shares, one for each child, one for Siri (absent), and the last one for himself. In setting apart one share for Siri, Strindberg noted, in a shy voice, "This is for your mother - it's to settle an old debt". When the children returned to Helsinki, Siri was surprised to hear that she had been included, but accepted the money and told them in a voice that was, according to her daughter Karin, both proud and moved, "I shall accept it, receiving it as an old debt". The debt was less financial than mental and emotional; Strindberg knew he had sometimes treated her unfairly during the later years of their marriage and at their divorce trial. In 1912, she would pass away only a few weeks before him.

In 1907, Strindberg co-founded The Intimate Theatre in Stockholm, together with the young actor and stage director August Falck. His theatre was modeled after Max Reinhardt's Kammerspiel Haus. Strindberg and Falck had the intention of the theatre being used for his plays and his plays only, Strindberg also wanted to try out a more chamber-oriented and sparse style of dramatic writing and production. In time for the theatre's opening, Strindberg wrote four chamber plays: Thunder in the Air, The Burned Site, The Ghost Sonata, and The Pelican; these were generally not a success with audiences or newspaper critics at the time but have been highly influential on modern drama (and soon would reach wider audiences at Reinhardt's theatre in Berlin and other German stages). Strindberg had very specific ideas about how the theatre would be opened and operated. He drafted a series of rules for his theatre in a letter to August Falck:

1. No liquor.
2. No Sunday performances.
3. Short performances without intermissions.
4. No calls.
5. Only 160 seats in the auditorium.
6. No prompter. No orchestra, only music on stage.
7. The text will be sold at the box office and in the lobby.
8. Summer performances.

Falck helped to design the auditorium, which was decorated in a deep-green tone. The ceiling lighting was a yellow silk cover which created an effect of mild daylight. The floor was covered with a deep-green carpet, and the auditorium was decorated by six ultra modern columns with elaborate up-to-date capitals. Instead of the usual restaurant Strindberg offered a lounge for the ladies and a smoking-room for the gentlemen. The stage was unusually small, only 6 by 9 metres. The small stage and minimal number of seats was meant to give the audience a greater feeling of involvement in the work. Unlike most theatres at this time, the Intima Teater was not a place in which people could come to socialize. By setting up his rules and creating an intimate atmosphere, Strindberg was able to demand the audience's focus. When the theatre opened in 1907 with a performance of The Pelican it was a rather large hit. Strindberg used a minimal technique, as was his way, by only having a back drop and some sea shells on the stage for scene design and props. Strindberg was much more concerned with the actors portraying the written word than the stage looking pretty.

The theatre ran into a financial difficulty in February 1908 and Falck had to borrow money from Prince Eugen, Duke of Närke, who attended the première of The Pelican. The theatre eventually went bankrupt in 1910, but did not close until Strindberg's death in 1912. The newspapers wrote about the theatre until its death.

=== Death and funeral ===
Strindberg in his later years

Strindberg died shortly after the first staging of one of his plays in the United States — The Father opened on 9 April 1912 at the Berkeley Theatre in New York, in a translation by painter and playwright Edith Gardener Shearn Oland and her husband actor Warner Oland. They jointly published their translations of his plays in book form in 1912.

During Christmas 1911, Strindberg became sick with pneumonia and he never recovered completely. He also began to suffer more clearly from a stomach cancer (early signs of which had been felt in 1908). The final weeks of his life were painful. He had long since become a national celebrity, even if highly controversial, and when it became clear that he was seriously ill the daily papers in Stockholm began reporting on his health in every edition. He received many letters and telegrams from admirers across the country. He died on 14 May 1912 at the age of 63.

Strindberg was interred at Norra begravningsplatsen in Stockholm. He had given strict instructions concerning his funeral and how his body should be treated after death: only members of his immediate family were allowed to view his body, there would be no autopsy, no photographs were taken, and no death mask was made. Strindberg had also requested that his funeral should take place as soon as possible after his death to avoid crowds of onlookers. However, the workers' organisations requested that the funeral should take place on a Sunday to make it possible for working men to pay their respects, and the funeral was postponed for five days, until Sunday, 19 May. According to Strindberg's last wish, the funeral procession was to start at 8am, again to avoid crowds, but large groups of people were nevertheless waiting outside his home as well as at the cemetery, as early as 7am. A short service was conducted by Nathan Söderblom by the bier in Strindberg's home, in the presence of three of Strindberg's children and his housekeeper, after which the coffin was taken outside for the funeral procession. The procession was followed by groups of students, workers, members of Parliament and a couple of cabinet ministers, and it was estimated that up to 60,000 people lined the streets. King Gustaf V sent a wreath for the bier.

== Writings ==
Strindberg's novel The Red Room (1879) made him famous. His early plays belong to the Naturalistic movement. His works from this time are often compared with the Norwegian playwright Henrik Ibsen. Strindberg's best-known play from this period is Miss Julie. Among his most widely read works is the novel The People of Hemsö.

Strindberg wanted to attain what he called "greater Naturalism". He disliked the expository character backgrounds that characterise the work of Henrik Ibsen and rejected the convention of a dramatic "slice of life" because he felt that the resulting plays were mundane and uninteresting. Strindberg felt that true naturalism was a psychological "battle of brains": two people who hate each other in the immediate moment and strive to drive the other to doom is the type of mental hostility that Strindberg strove to describe. He intended his plays to be impartial and objective, citing a desire to make literature akin to a science.

Following the inner turmoil that he experienced during the "Inferno crisis", he wrote an important book in French, Inferno (1896–7), in which he dramatised his experiences. He also exchanged a few cryptic letters with Friedrich Nietzsche.

Strindberg subsequently ended his association with Naturalism and began to produce works informed by Symbolism. He is considered one of the pioneers of the modern European stage and Expressionism. The Dance of Death, A Dream Play, and The Ghost Sonata are well-known plays from this period. His most famous and produced plays are Master Olof, Miss Julie, and The Father.

Internationally, Strindberg is chiefly remembered as a playwright, but in his native Sweden his name is associated no less with novels and other writings. Röda rummet (The Red Room), Hemsöborna (The People of Hemsö), En dåres försvarstal (The Confession of a Fool), and Inferno remain among his most celebrated novels, representing different genres and styles. Some of his prose works such as Det nya riket and Svarta fanor are notably satirical in style.

Strindberg also wrote numerous short stories, including his best known collection Giftas ("Getting Married") and historical stories collected in Svenska öden och äventyr, scientific and cultural studies, essays and poems.

== Legacy ==
Strindberg's works have been widely influential on Swedish and international literature and an inspiration to numerous authors, playwrights, literary works and film makers. Tennessee Williams, Edward Albee, Maxim Gorky, John Osborne, and Ingmar Bergman are among the many artists who have cited Strindberg as an influence. Eugene O'Neill, upon receiving the Nobel Prize in Literature, dedicated much of his acceptance speech to describing Strindberg's influence on his work, and referred to him as "that greatest genius of all modern dramatists."

Writers influenced by Strindberg also include Franz Kafka, Russian writer Alexander Blok, expressionistic and absurd drama represented by, among others, Samuel Beckett, and philosophical writers such as Walter Benjamin and Theodor W. Adorno. Argentinian writer Jorge Luis Borges said of Strindberg: "[he] was, for a time, my god, alongside Nietzsche".

He is often, though not universally, viewed as Sweden's greatest author, and taught in schools as a key figure of Swedish culture. The most important contemporary literary award in Sweden, Augustpriset, is named for Strindberg.

In 1945, the literary society "Strindbergssällskapet" was formed with the purpose to promote awareness of Strindberg and his work. The society initiated a project to collect and publish Strindbergs numerous letters, promoted the publication of a new edition of Strindberg's collected works and initiated the idea that Strindbergs home on Drottninggatan in Stockholm should be turned into a museum. In 1960, the Strindberg Museum on Drottninggatan was inaugurated.

Strindbergssällskapet awards the prize Strindbergspriset to an individual or institution who promotes awareness of Strindberg's work. The first recipient in 1988 was the Royal Dramatic Theatre in Stockholm.

Strindberg's life and work has been the subject of numerous studies and biographies. Several of his best known plays and novels has been adapted to films and television series. He has been portrayed in literary works such as the play Tribadernas natt and the television series Strindberg: Ett liv, both written by Per Olov Enquist.

In 1981, Strindberg's collected works began to be published in Sweden as "The National Edition" of 72 thoroughly revised and commented volumes, which replaced an older 55 volume collected works edition published between 1912 and 1920.

The Swedish composer Ture Rangström dedicated his first Symphony, which was finished in 1914, to August Strindberg in memoriam.

== Social criticism ==
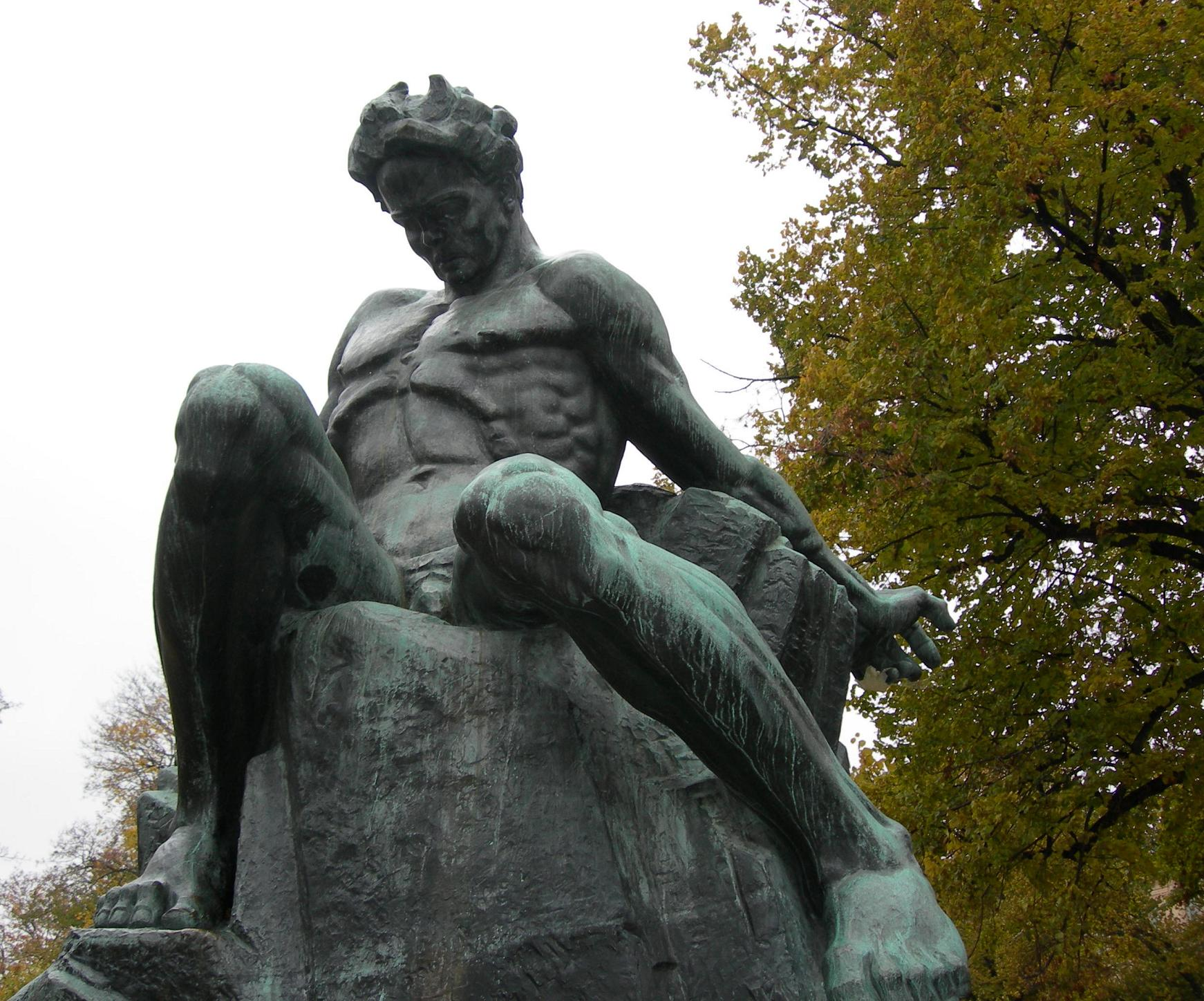
Carl Eldh's statue of Strindberg in Tegnérlunden, Stockholm. Dubbed The Titan, it represents Strindberg as Prometheus, tormented for defying the Gods.

An acerbic polemicist who was often vehemently opposed to conventional authority, Strindberg was difficult to pigeon-hole as a political figure. Through his long career, he penned scathing attacks on the military, the church, and the monarchy. For most of his public life, he was seen as a major figure on the literary left and a standard-bearer of cultural radicalism, but, especially from the 1890s, he espoused conservative and religious views that alienated many former supporters. He resumed his attacks on conservative society with great vigor in the years immediately preceding his death.

Strindberg's opinions were typically stated with great force and vitriol, and sometimes humorously over-stated. He was involved in a variety of crises and feuds, skirmishing regularly with the literary and cultural establishment of his day, including erstwhile allies and friends. His youthful reputation as a genial enfant terrible of Swedish literature, transformed, eventually, into the role of a sort of ill-tempered towering giant of Swedish public life.

Strindberg was a prolific letter-writer, whose private communications have been collected in several annotated volumes. He often voiced political views privately to friends and literary acquaintances, phrased in a no-holds-barred jargon of scathing attacks, drastic humor, and flippant hyperbole. Many of his most controversial political statements are drawn from this private correspondence.

Influenced by the history of the 1871 Paris Commune, the young Strindberg had embraced the view that politics was the art of the upper class to keep the lower class under itself. Early works like the Red Room or Master Olof took aim at public hypocrisy, royalty, and organized religion. He was, at this time, an outspoken socialist, mainly influenced by anarchist or libertarian socialist ideas. However, Strindberg's socialism was undogmatic and rooted in a ruthless critique of state, church, school, press, and economy in which he aimed at pitting the people against kings, economists, priests, and merchants. A small example from this period is his Little Catechism for the Underclass.

He read widely among progressive thinkers, including Cabet, Fourier, Babeuf, Saint-Simon, Proudhon, and Owen, whom he referred to as "friends of humanity and sharp thinkers." "Strindberg adopted ideas from everyone," writes Jan Olsson, who notes that Strindberg lived in a period where "terms like anarchism, socialism, and communism were alternately used as synonyms and as different terms."

By the early 1880s, many young political and literary radicals in Sweden had come to view Strindberg as a champion of their causes. However, in contrast to the Marxist-influenced socialism then rising within the Swedish labor movement, Strindberg espoused an older type of agrarian radicalism accompanied by spiritual and even mystical ideas. His views remained as fluid and eclectic as they were uncompromising, and on certain issues he could be wildly out of step with the younger generation of socialists. To Martin Kylhammar, the young Strindberg "was a 'reactionary radical' whose writing was populist and democratic but who persisted in an antiquated romanticizing of agrarian life."

Although he had been an early proponent of women's rights, calling for women's suffrage in 1884, Strindberg later became disenchanted with what he viewed as an unnatural equation of the sexes. In times of personal conflict and marital trouble (which was much of the time), he could lash out with crudely misogynistic statements. His troubled marriage with Siri von Essen, ended in an upsetting divorce in 1891, became the inspiration for The Defence of a Fool, begun in 1887 and published in 1893. Strindberg famously sought to insert a warning to lawmakers against "granting citizens' rights to half-apes, lower beings, sick children, [who are] sick and crazed thirteen times a year during their periods, completely insane while pregnant, and irresponsible throughout the rest of their lives." The paragraph was ultimately removed before printing by his publisher.

Strindberg's misogyny was at odds with the younger generation of socialist activists and has drawn attention in contemporary Strindberg scholarship. So has Strindberg's anti-Jewish rhetoric. Although particularly targeting Jewish enemies of his in Swedish cultural life, he also attacked Jews and Judaism as such. The antisemitic outbursts were particularly pronounced in the early 1880s, when Strindberg dedicated an entire chapter ("Moses") in a work of social and political satire, Det nya riket, dedicated to heckling Swedish Jews (including an unflattering portrayal of Albert Bonnier). Although anti-Jewish prejudice was far from uncommon in wider society in the 1880s, Jan Myrdal notes that "the entire liberal and democratic intelligentsia of the time distanced themselves from the older, left-wing antisemitism of August Strindberg." Yet, as with many things, Strindberg's opinions and passions shifted with time. In the mid-1880s he toned down and then mostly ended his anti-Jewish rhetoric, after publicly declaring himself not to be an anti-Semite in 1884.

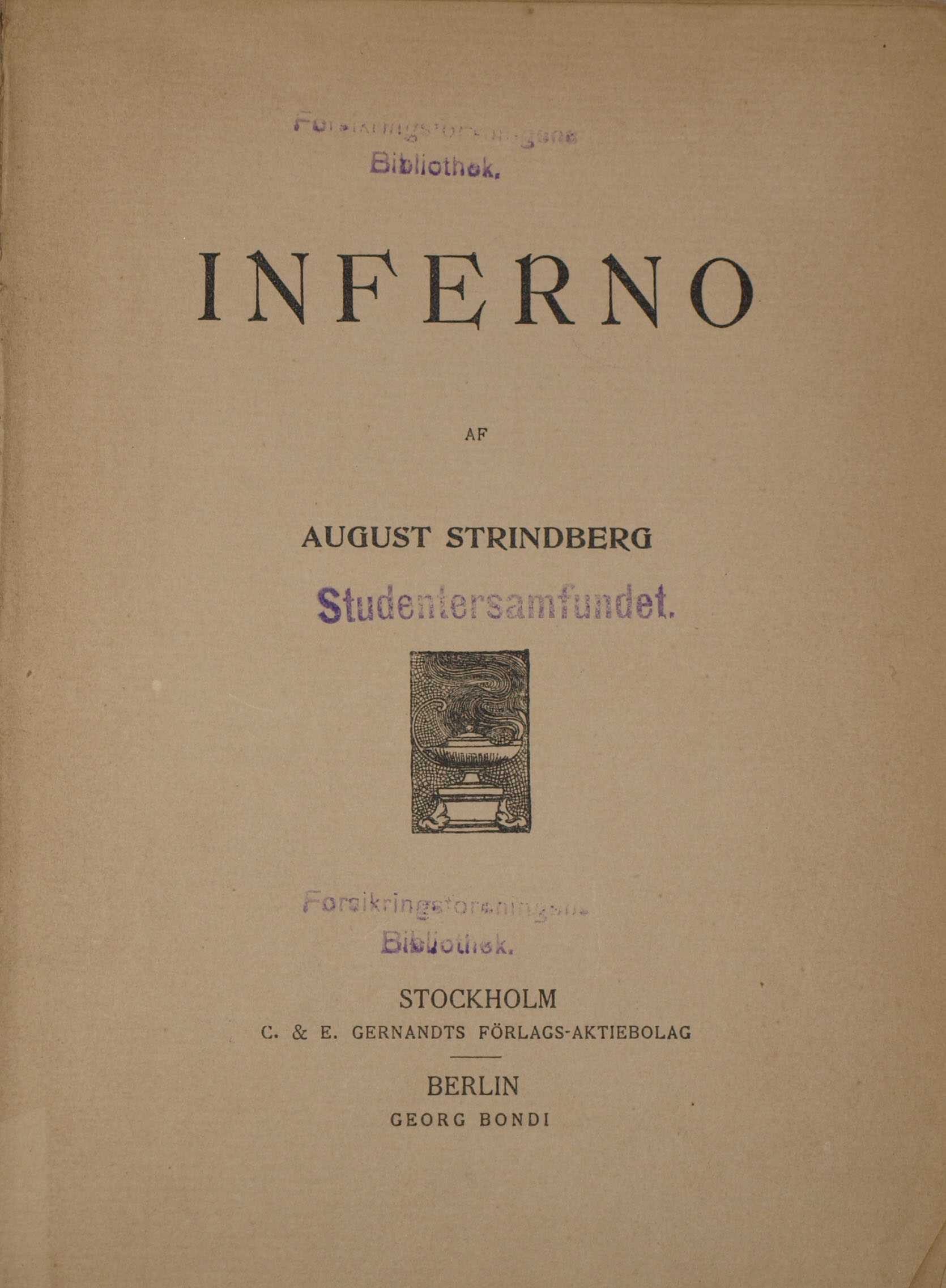
The title page of the first edition of August Strindbergs "Inferno" from 1897

A self-declared atheist in his younger years, Strindberg would also re-embrace Christianity, without necessarily making his peace with the church. As noted by Stockholm's Strindberg Museum, the personal and spiritual crisis that Strindberg underwent in Paris in the 1890s, which prompted the writing of Inferno, had aesthetic as well as philosophical and political implications: "Before the Inferno crisis (1869 – 92), Strindberg was influenced by anarchism, Rousseau, Schopenhauer, and Nietzsche; in the years after the crisis (1897 – 1911) he was influenced by Swedenborg, Goethe, Shakespeare, and Beethoven."

In Inferno, Strindberg notes his ideological and spiritual evolution:

What is the purpose of having toiled through thirty years only to gain, through experience, that which I had already understood as a concept? In my youth, I was a sincere believer, and you [i.e. the powers that be] have made me a free-thinker. Out of a free-thinker you have made me an atheist; out of an atheist, a religious believer. Inspired by humanitarian ideas, I have praised socialism. Five years later, you have proven to me the unreasonableness of socialism. Everything that once enthralled me you have invalidated! And presuming that I will now abandon myself to religion, I am certain that you will, in ten years, disprove religion. (Strindberg, Inferno, Chapter XV.)

Despite his reactionary attitudes on issues such as women's rights and his conservative, mystical turn from the early 1890s, Strindberg remained popular with some in the socialist-liberal camp on the strength of his past radicalism and his continued salience as a literary modernizer. However, several former admirers were disappointed and troubled by what they viewed as Strindberg's descent into religious conservatism and, perhaps, madness. His former ally and friend, Social Democrat leader Hjalmar Branting, now dismissed the author as a "disaster" who had betrayed his past ideals for a reactionary, mystical elitism. In 1909, Branting remarked on Strindberg's shifting political and cultural posture, on the occasion of the author's sixtieth birthday:

To the young Strindberg, the trail-blazer, the rouser from sleep, let us offer all our praise and admiration. To the writer in a more mature age [let us offer] a place of rank on the Aeropagus of European erudition. But to the Strindberg of Black Banners [1907] and A Blue Book [1907-1912], who, in the shadows of Inferno [1898] has been converted to a belief in the sickly, empty gospels of mysticism – let us wish, from our hearts, that he may once again become his past self. (Hjalmar Branting, in Social-Demokraten, 22 January 1909.)

Toward the end of his life, however, Strindberg would dramatically reassert his role as a radical standard-bearer and return to the good graces of progressive Swedish opinion.

In April 1910, Strindberg launched a series of unprompted, insult-laden attacks on popular conservative symbols, viciously thrashing the nationalist cult of former king Charles XII ("pharao worship"), the lauded poet Verner von Heidenstam ("the spirit-seer of Djursholm"), and the famous author and traveler Sven Hedin ("the humbug explorer"). The ensuing debate, known as "Strindbergsfejden" or "The Strindberg Feud", is one of the most significant literary debates in Swedish history. It came to comprise about a thousand articles by various authors across some eighty newspapers, raging for two years until Strindberg's death in 1912. The Feud served to revive Strindberg's reputation as an implacable enemy of bourgeois tastes, while also reestablishing beyond doubt his centrality to Swedish culture and politics. In 1912, Strindberg's funeral was co-organized by Branting and heavily attended by members of the Swedish labor movement, with "more than 100 red banners" in attendance alongside the entire Social Democrat parliamentary contingent.

Strindberg's daughter Karin Strindberg married a Russian Bolshevik of partially Swedish ancestry, Vladimir Smirnov ("Paulsson").

== Painting ==
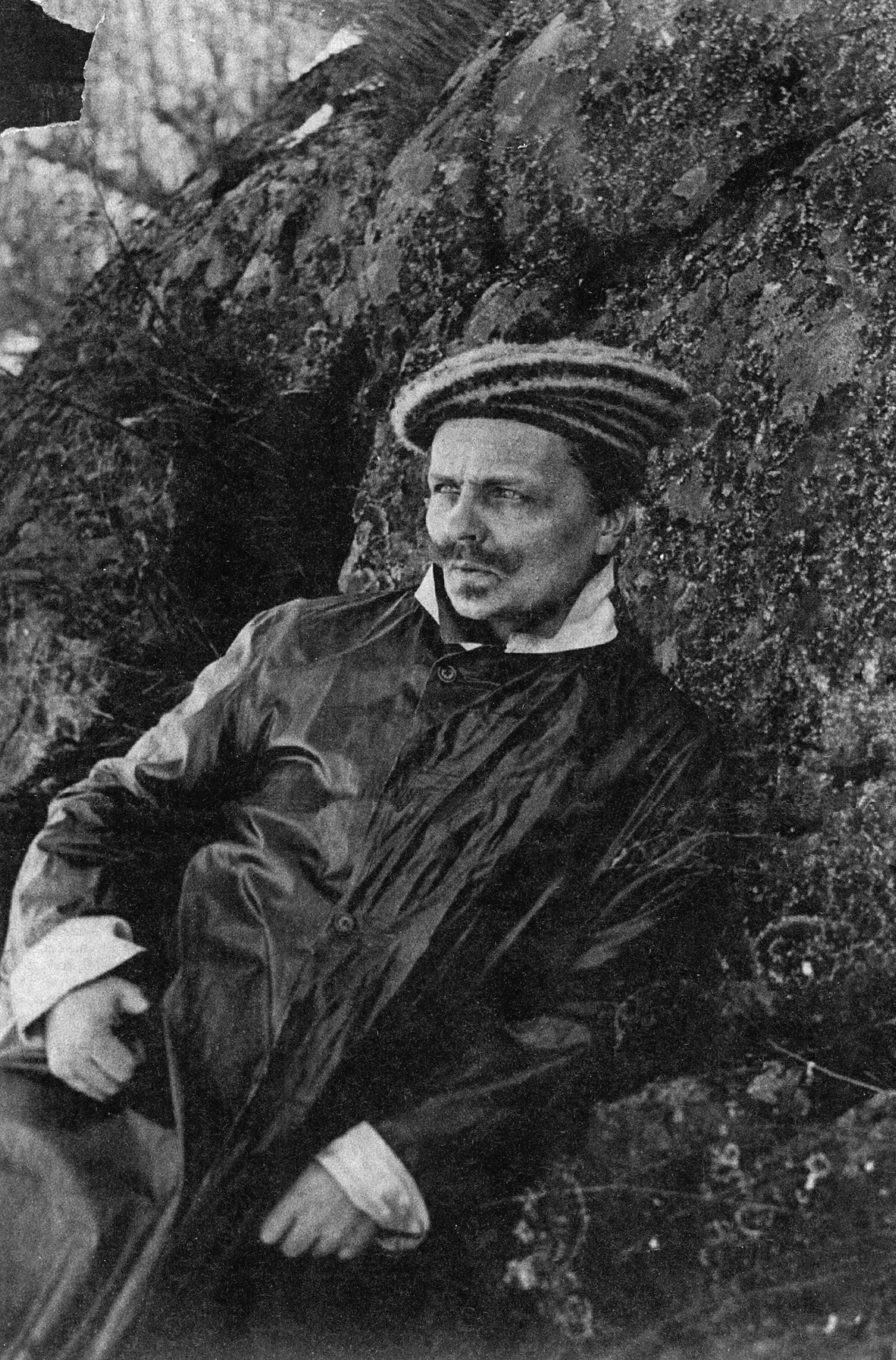
Self-portrait at Värmdö-Brevik, Tyresö Municipality, in 1891

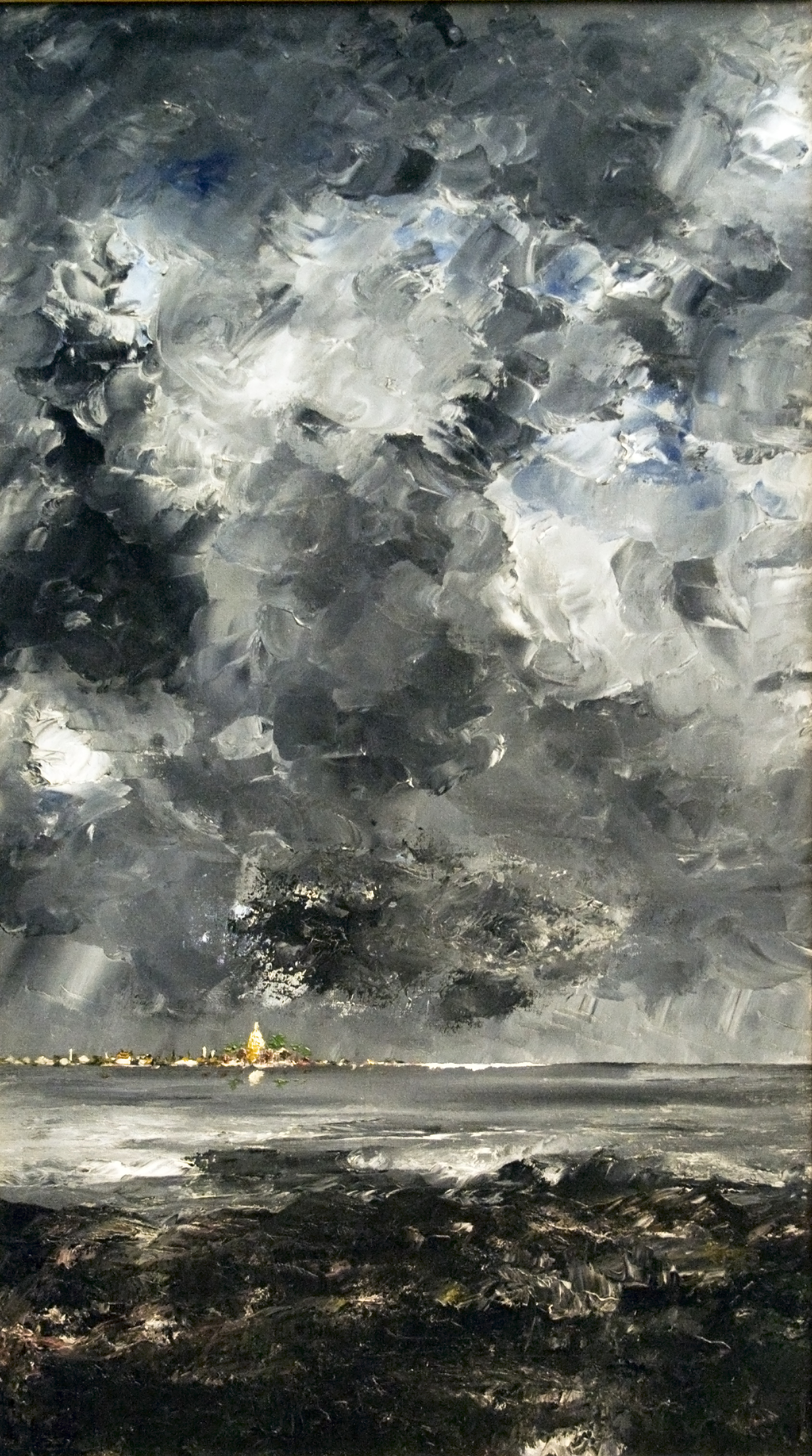
The Town – painting by Strindberg from 1903

Strindberg, something of a polymath, was also a telegrapher, theosophist, painter, photographer and alchemist.

Painting and photography offered vehicles for his belief that chance played a crucial part in the creative process.

Strindberg's paintings were unique for their time, and went beyond those of his contemporaries for their radical lack of adherence to visual reality. The 117 paintings that are acknowledged as his were mostly painted within the span of a few years, and are now seen by some as among the most original works of 19th-century art.

Today, his best-known pieces are stormy, expressionist seascapes, selling at high prices in auction houses. Though Strindberg was friends with Edvard Munch and Paul Gauguin, and was thus familiar with modern trends, the spontaneous and subjective expressiveness of his landscapes and seascapes can be ascribed also to the fact that he painted only in periods of personal crisis. Anders Zorn also did a portrait.

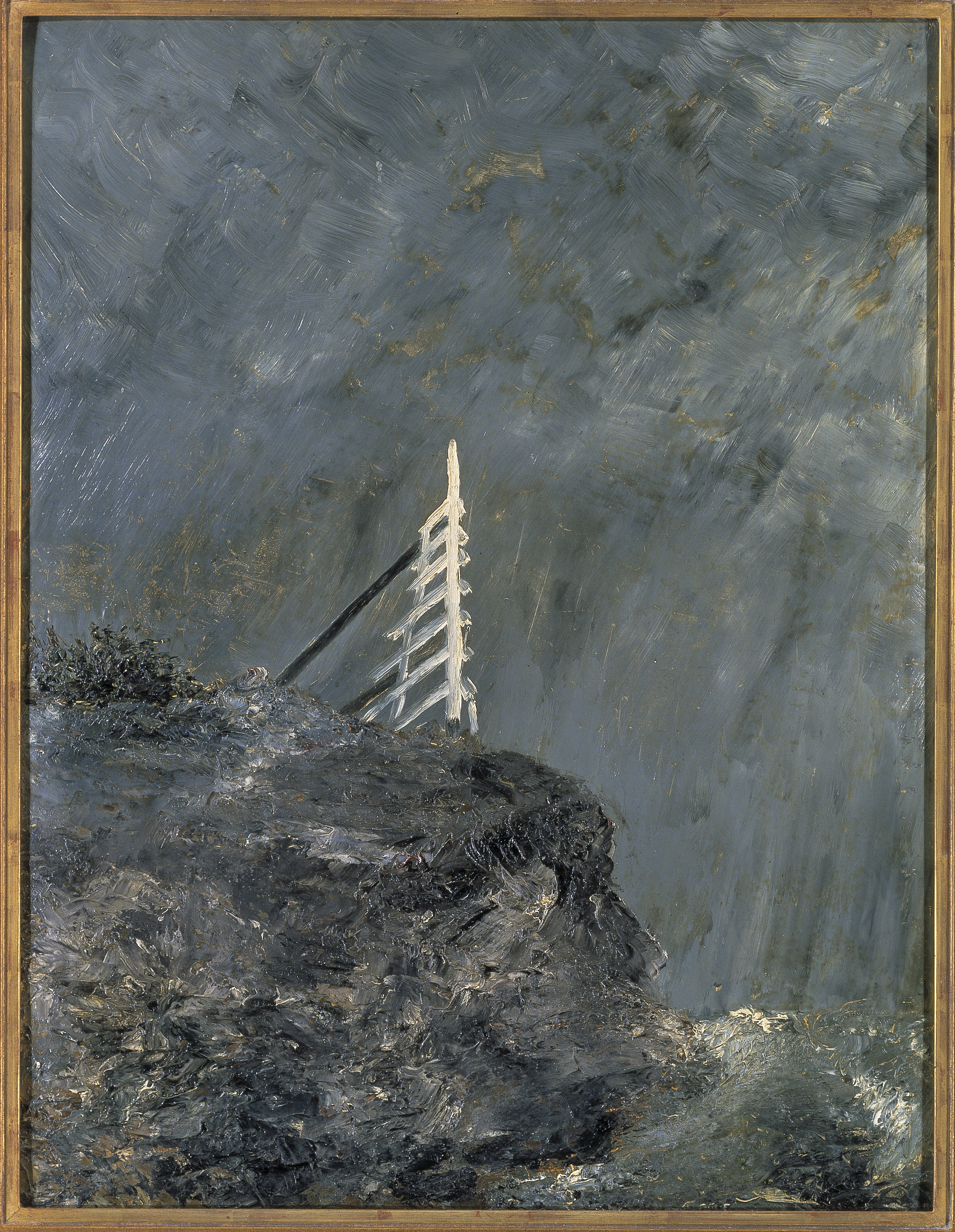
The white horse, 1892

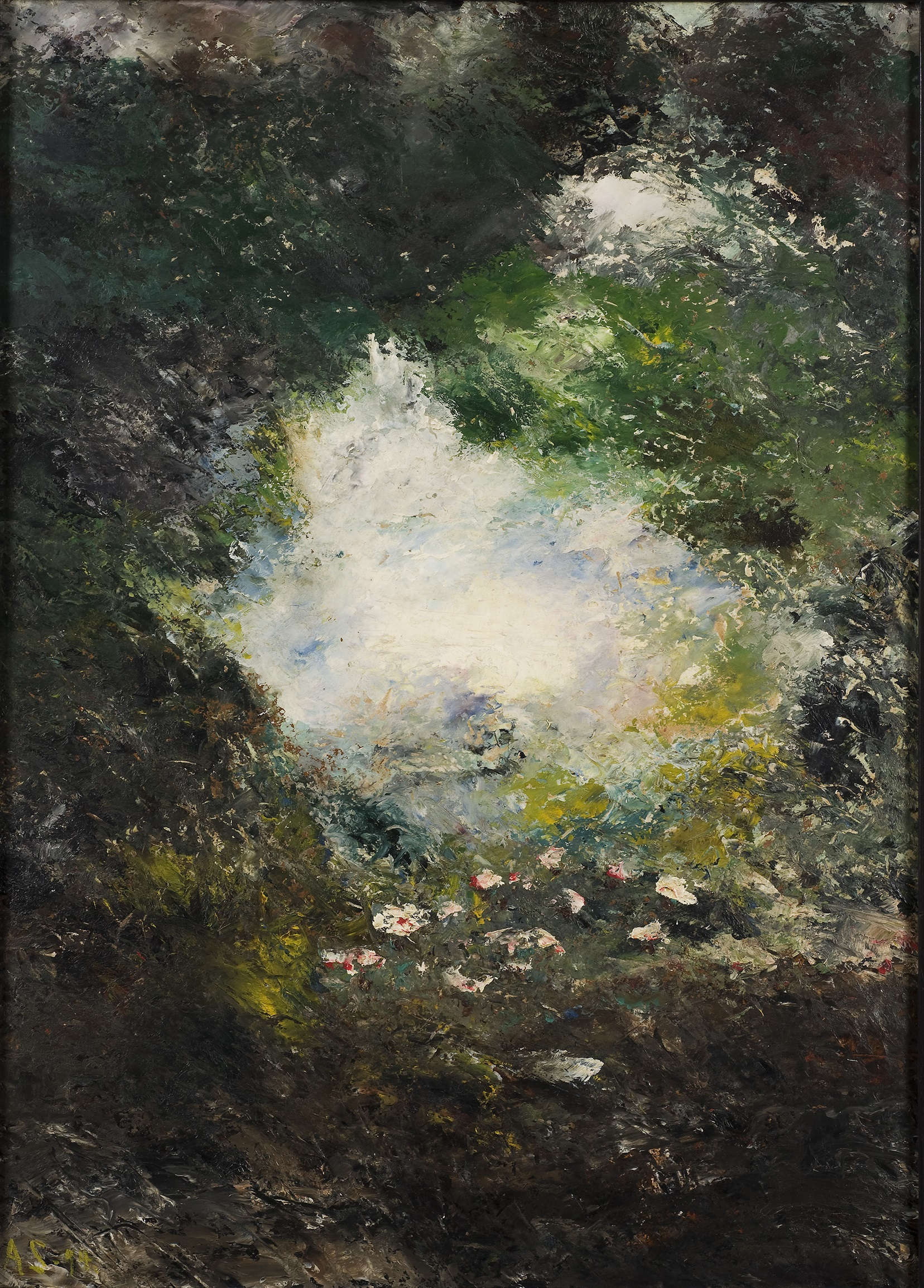
The wonderland, 1894

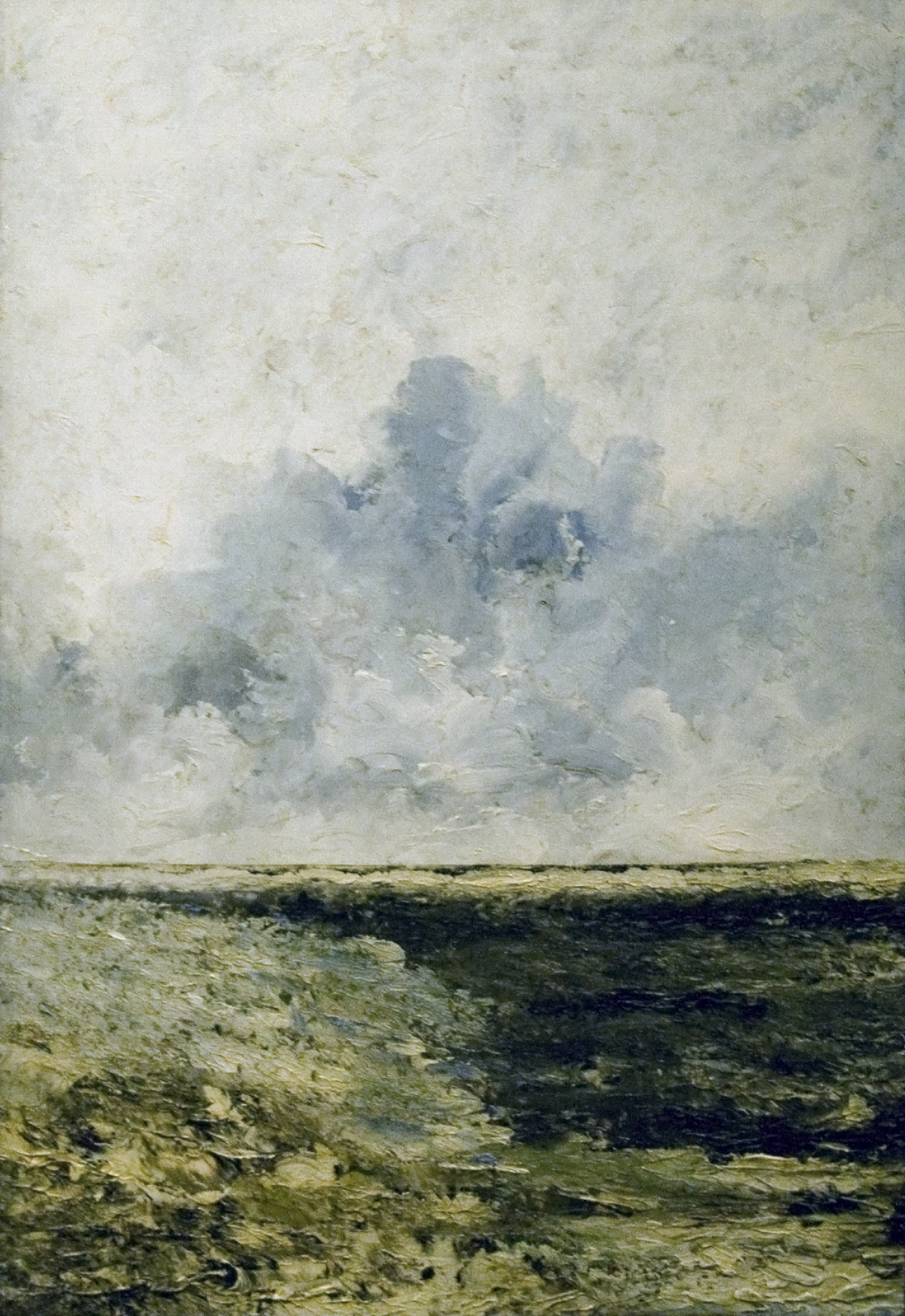
Marin, 1894

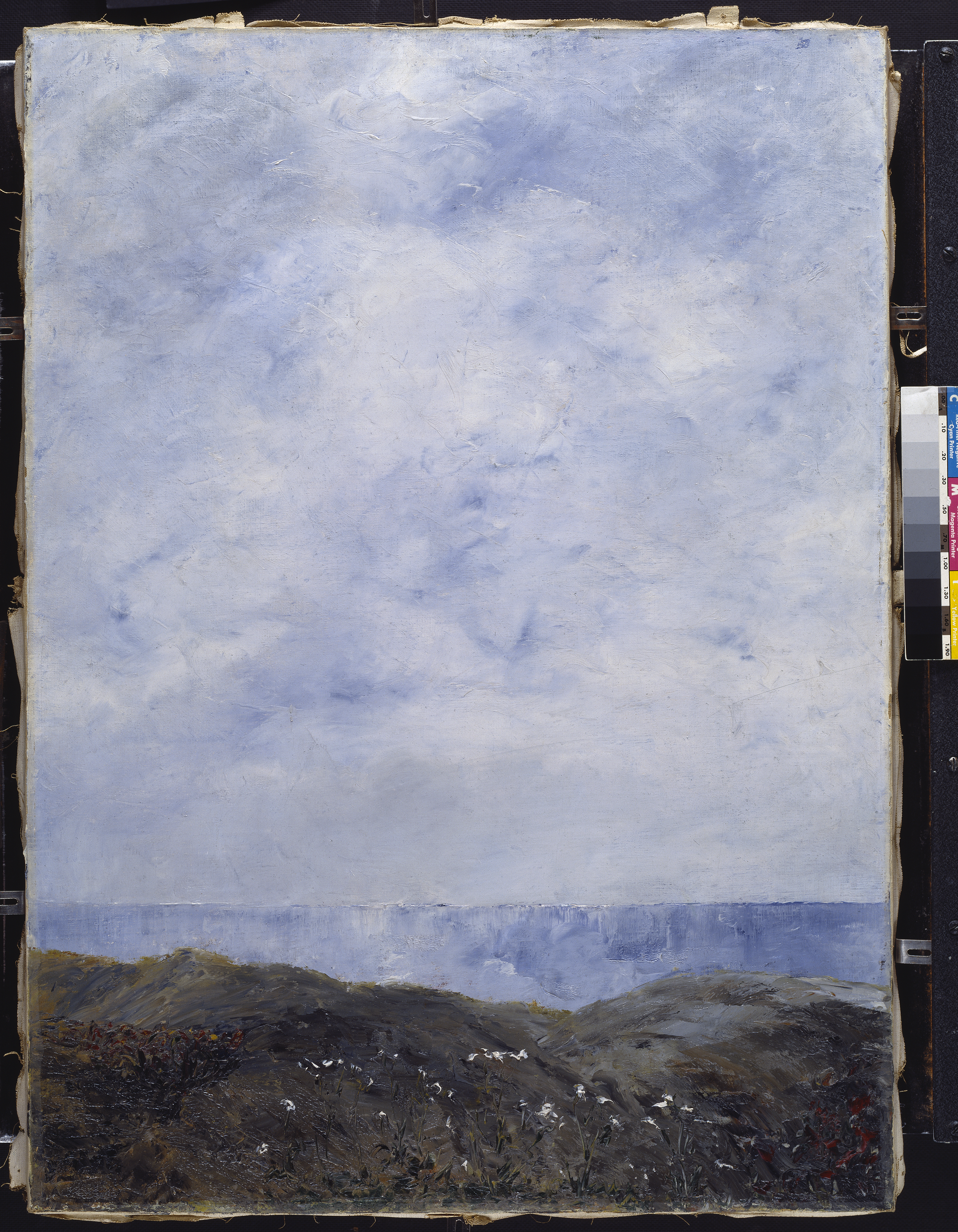
The coast II, 1903

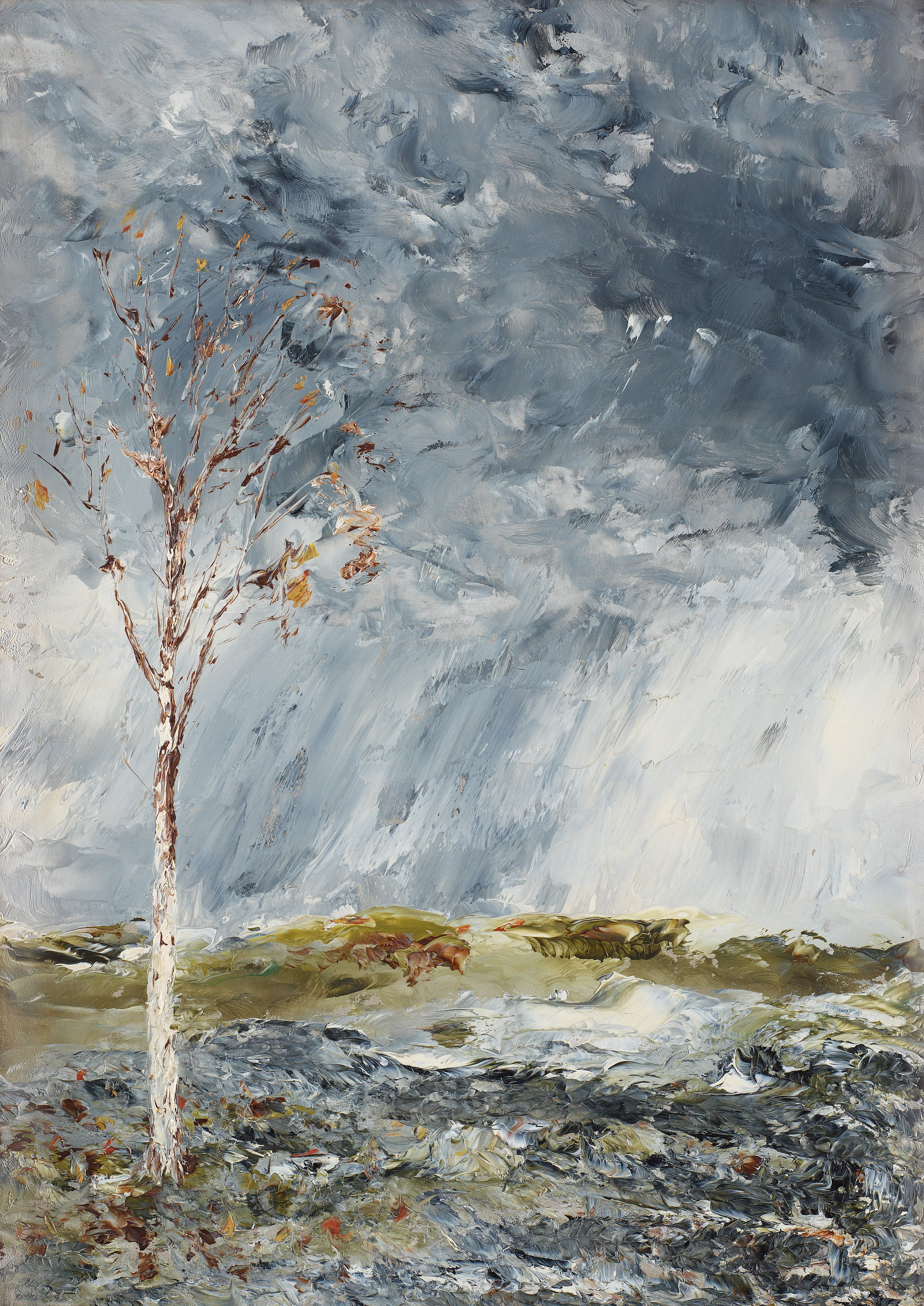
Birch autumn I

== Photography ==
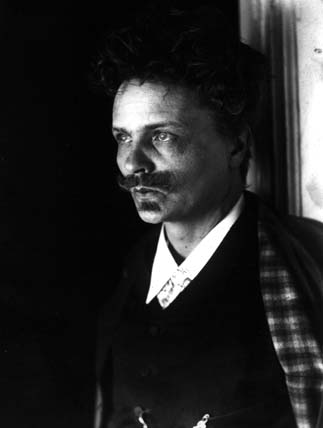
Photographic self-portrait, c. 1892.

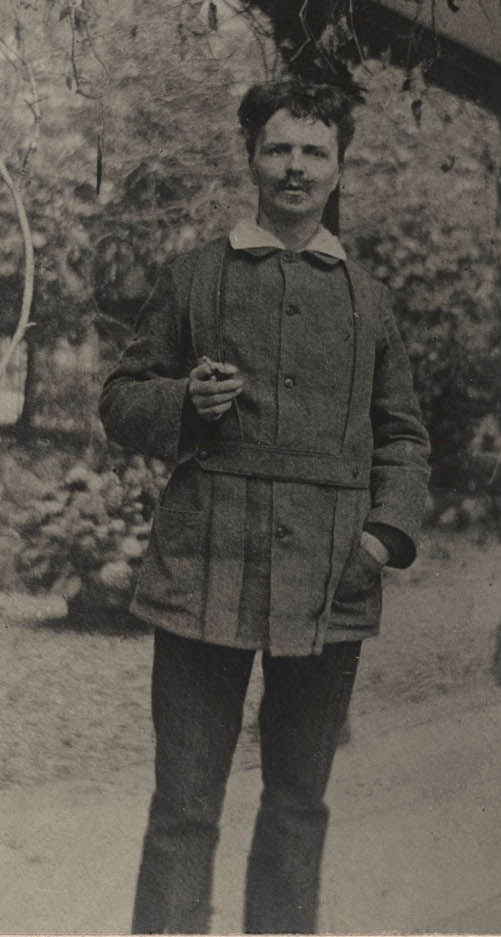
Photographic self-portrait in Gersau, Switzerland, 1886.

Strindberg's interest in photography resulted, among other things, in a large number of arranged self-portraits in various environments, which now number among the best-known pictures of him. Strindberg also embarked on a series of camera-less images, using an experimental quasi-scientific approach. He produced a type of photogram that encouraged the development and growth of crystals on the photographic emulsion, sometimes exposed for lengthy periods to heat or cold in the open air or at night facing the stars. The suggestiveness of these, which he called Celestographs, provided an object for contemplation, and he noted;

Today, in these days of x-rays, the miracle was that neither a camera nor a lens was used. For me this means a great opportunity to demonstrate the real circumstances by means of my photographs made without a camera and lens, recording the firmament in early spring 1894.

His interest in the occult in the 1890s finds sympathy with the chance quality of these images, but for him they are also scientific. In 1895 Strindberg met Camille Flammarion and became a member of the Société astronomique de France. He gave some of his experimental astronomical photographs to the Society.

== Occult studies ==
Alchemy, occultism, Swedenborgianism, and various other eccentric interests were pursued by Strindberg with some intensity for periods of his life.

In the curious and experimental 1897 work Inferno – a dark, paranoid, and confusing tale of his time in Paris, written in French, which takes the form of an autobiographical journal – Strindberg, as the narrator, claims to have successfully performed alchemical experiments and cast black magic spells on his daughter. Much of Inferno indicates that the author suffered from paranoid delusions, as he writes of being stalked through Paris, haunted by evil forces, and targeted with mind-altering electric rays emitted by an "infernal machine" covertly installed in his hotel. It remains unclear to what extent the book represents a genuine attempt at autobiography or exaggerates for literary effect. Olof Lagercrantz has suggested that Strindberg staged and imagined elements of the crisis as material for his literary production.

== Personal life ==
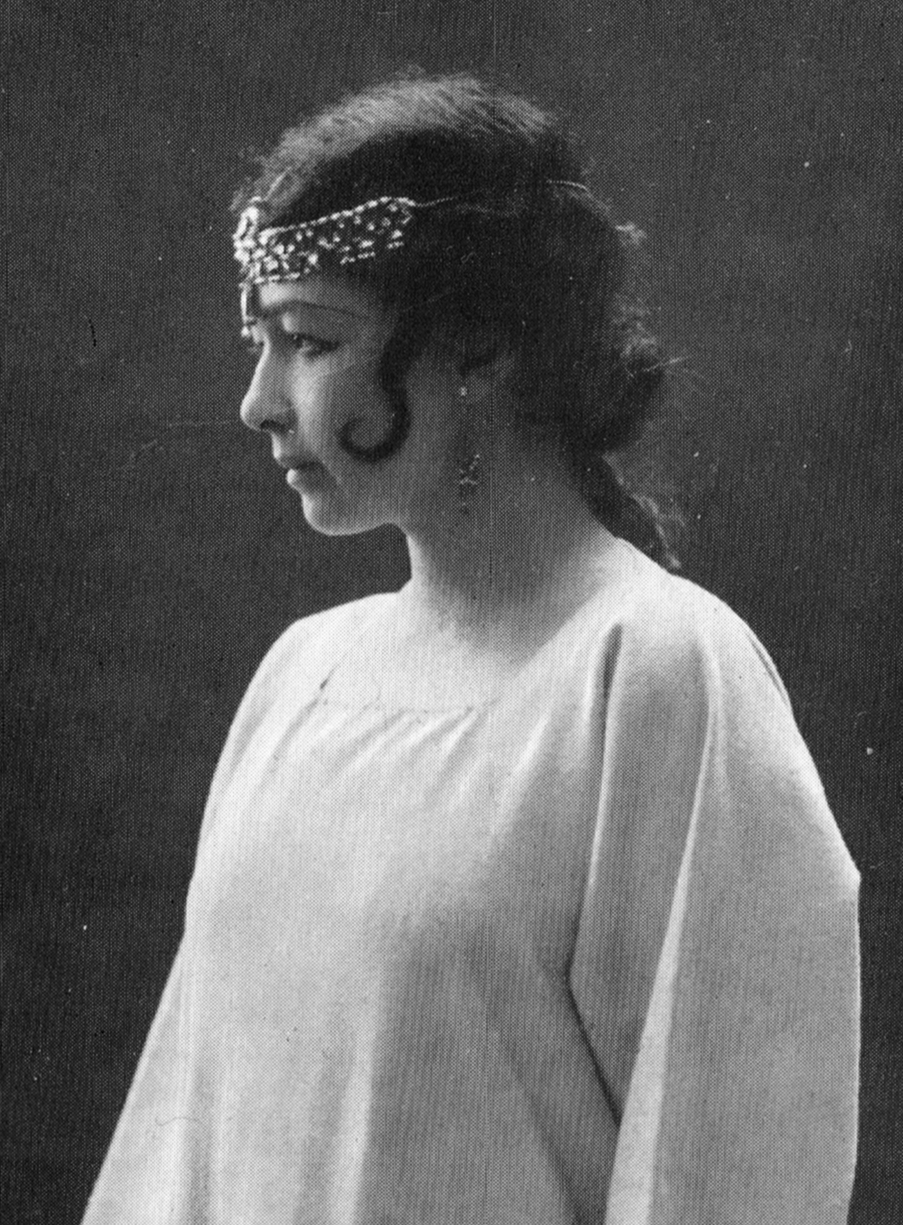
Strindberg's third wife, the actress Harriet Bosse, as Indra's Daughter in the 1907 première of A Dream Play

Strindberg was married three times, as follows:

- Siri von Essen: married 1877–1891 (14 years), 3 daughters (Karin Smirnov, Greta, and another who died in infancy), 1 son (Hans);
- Frida Uhl: married 1893–1895 (2 years), 1 daughter (Kerstin); and
- Harriet Bosse: married 1901–1904 (3 years), 1 daughter (Anne-Marie).

Strindberg was age 28 and Siri was 27 at the time of their marriage. He was 44 and Frida was 21 when they married, and he was 52 and Harriet was 23 when they married. Late during his life he met the young actress and painter Fanny Falkner (1890–1963) who was 41 years younger than Strindberg. She wrote a book which illuminates his last years, but the exact nature of their relationship is debated. He had a brief affair in Berlin with Dagny Juel before his marriage to Frida; it has been suggested that the news of her murder in 1901 was the reason he cancelled his honeymoon with his third wife, Harriet.

He was related to Nils Strindberg (a son of one of August's cousins).

Strindberg's relationships with women were troubled and have often been interpreted as misogynistic by contemporaries and modern readers. Marriage and families were under stress in Strindberg's lifetime as Sweden industrialized and urbanized at a rapid pace. Problems of prostitution and poverty were debated among writers, critics and politicians. His early writing often dealt with the traditional roles of the sexes imposed by society, which he criticized as unjust.

Strindberg's last home was Blå tornet in central Stockholm, where he lived from 1908 until 1912. It is now a museum, known as the Strindberg Museum, which is open to visitors. It contains numerous of Strindberg's personal possessions including his piano.

Of several statues and busts of him erected in Stockholm, the most prominent is Carl Eldh's, erected in 1942 in Tegnérlunden, a park adjoining this house.

== Published works ==
- La cruauté et le théâtre de Strindberg de Pascale Roger, coll "Univers théâtral", L'Harmattan, Paris, 2004, 278 p.
- The Growth of a Soul (1914)
- The German Lieutenant, and Other Stories (1915)
- There Are Crimes and Crimes

== See also ==
- List of paintings by August Strindberg

== Sources ==
- Adams, Ann-Charlotte Gavel, ed. 2002. Dictionary of Literary Biography. Vol. 259 Twentieth-Century Swedish Writers Before World War II. Detroit, MI: Gale. ISBN 0-7876-5261-X.
- Carlson, Marvin. 1993. Theories of the Theatre: A Historical and Critical Survey from the Greeks to the Present. Expanded ed. Ithaca and London: Cornell University Press. ISBN 978-0-8014-8154-3.
- Ekman, Hans-Göran. 2000. Strindberg and the Five Senses: Studies in Strindberg's Chamber Plays. London and New Brunswick, New Jersey: Athlone. ISBN 0-485-11552-2.
- Gunnarsson, Torsten. 1998. Nordic Landscape Painting in the Nineteenth Century. New Haven: Yale UP. ISBN 0-300-07041-1.
- Innes, Christopher, ed. 2000. A Sourcebook on Naturalist Theatre. London and New York: Routledge. ISBN 0-415-15229-1.
- Lagercrantz, Olof. 1984. August Strindberg. Trans. Anselm Hollo. New York: Farrar Straus Giroux. ISBN 0-374-10685-1.
- Lane, Harry. 1998. "Strindberg, August." In The Cambridge Guide to Theatre. Ed. Martin Banham. Cambridge: Cambridge UP. 1040–41. ISBN 0-521-43437-8.
- Strindberg, August (1987). Motherly Love ; Pariah ; The First Warning. Translated by Martinus, Eivor. Oxford: Amber Lane. ISBN 978-0-906399-79-8.
- Strindberg, August (1990). The Great Highway. Translated by Martinus, Eivor. Oberon Books. ISBN 0-948230-28-2.
- Strindberg, August (1995), McLeish, Kenneth (ed.), Miss Julie, London: Nick Hern Books, ISBN 978-1-85459-205-7
- Encyclopedia of Literature, Springfield, MA: Merriam-Webster, 1995, ISBN 0-87779-042-6.
- Meyer, Michael (1987). Strindberg: A Biography. Lives. Oxford: Oxford University Press. ISBN 0-19-281995-X.
- Strindberg, August (1912). Plays: The Father, Countess Julie, The Outlaw, The Stronger. Vol. 1. Translated by Oland, Edith; Oland, Wärner. Boston: John W. Luce.
- Strindberg, August (1912). Plays: Comrades, Facing Death, Pariah, Easter. Vol. 2. Translated by Oland, Edith; Oland, Wärner. Boston: John W. Luce.
- Strindberg, August (1914). Plays: Swanwhite, Advent, The Storm. Vol. 3. Translated by Oland, Edith; Oland, Wärner. Boston: John W. Luce..
- Strindberg, August (1970), World Historical Plays, translated by Paulson, Arvid, New York: Twayne Publishers & The American-Scandinavian Foundation.
- Robinson, Michael, ed. (2009), The Cambridge Companion to August Strindberg, Companions to Literature, Cambridge: Cambridge UP, ISBN 978-0-521-60852-7.
- Strindberg, August (1987). By the Open Sea. Translated by Sandbach, Mary. Harmondsworth, Middlesex: Penguin Classics. ISBN 0-14-044488-2.
- Strindberg, August (1912). The Confession of a Fool. Translated by Schluessner, Ellie. London: Stephen Swift.
- Strindberg, August (1913). The Red Room. Translated by Schluessner, Ellie. New York and London: Putnam.
- Ward, John. 1980. The Social and Religious Plays of Strindberg. London: Athlone. ISBN 0-485-11183-7.
- Williams, Raymond (1987) [1968], Drama from Ibsen to Brecht, London: Hogarth, ISBN 0-7012-0793-0.
- Williams, Raymond (1966), Modern Tragedy, London: Chatto & Windus, ISBN 0-7011-1260-3.
- Williams, Raymond (1989), Pinkney, Tony (ed.), The Politics of Modernism: Against the New Conformists, London and New York: Verso, ISBN 0-86091-955-2.
