= Wilhelmina Josephson =

Swedish pianist

- Born: 2 July 1816 Stockholm, Sweden
- Died: November 1906 (aged 90) Stockholm, Sweden
- Occupation: musician
- Instrument: piano

Wilhelmina "Mina" Josephson (2 July 1816 – 16 November 1906) was a Swedish pianist. She was regarded as one of the most notable concert pianists in contemporary Sweden. She had several well known pupils. She is also known as a friend of Jenny Lind.

== Life ==
Wilhelmina Josephson was born to the rich Jewish merchant Salomon Josephson and Beata Levin, and the sister of the composer Jacob Axel Josephson, the publisher Edvard Josephson, the industrialist Wilhelm Josephson and the theater director Ludvig Josephson.

She was raised in a musical home were her parents often hosted concerts, and debuted as a concert pianist at the age of twelve. Among the frequent guests of her mother's soirees were Maria Ruckman and Jenny Lind. Two years later, she became active as a teacher for students older than herself. In 1834, her family was nearly ruined after the death of her father, and she contributed financially to the support of her family by her profession as a concert pianist and music teacher. Among her students were Mathilda Ebeling, Ludvig Norman and Sophie Adlersparre. She introduced Jenny Lind in high society by introducing her to Adlersparre. During the 1830s and 1840s, she belonged to the elite of Swedish pianists. When Charles Mayer visited Stockholm in 1845, he refused to give her more lessons after his second, by saying that he had nothing more to teach her.

In 1844, Wilhelmina Josephson married the school principal Martin Schück and retired.
