= August Strindberg's Little Catechism for the Underclass =

"Little Catechism for the Underclass (Swedish: August Strindbergs lilla katekes för underklassen) is a catechism written by August Strindberg.
