= By the Open Sea =

1890 novel by August Strindberg

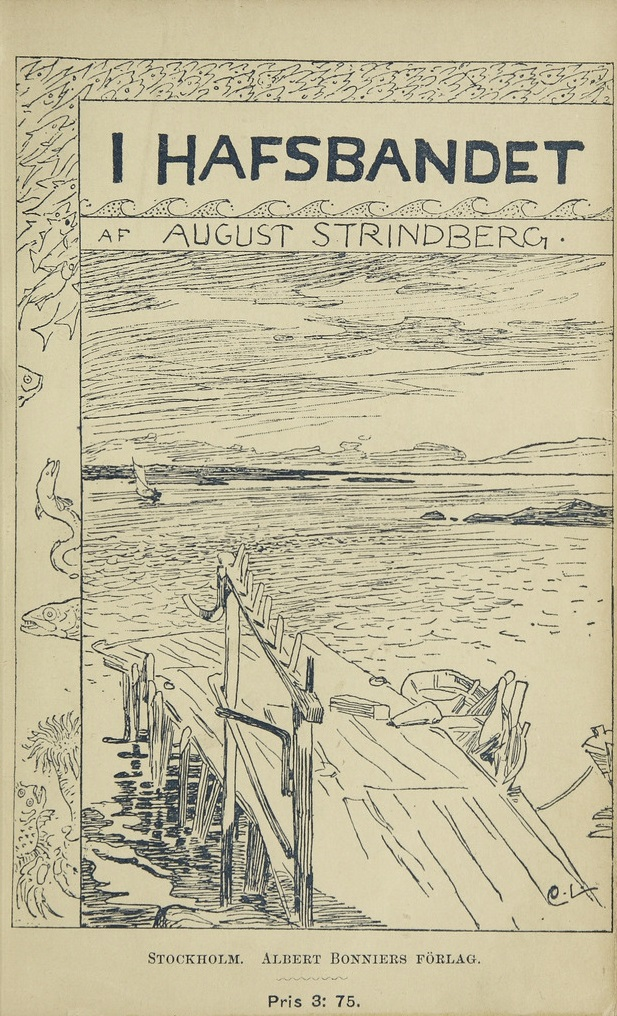
- Frontispiece
- Author: August Strindberg
- Original title: I hafsbandet
- Illustrator: Carl Larsson
- Language: Swedish
- Publisher: Albert Bonniers Förlag
- Publication date: 1890
- Publication place: Sweden
- English publication date: 1913
- Pages: 278

By the Open Sea (Swedish: I havsbandet) is an 1890 novel by the Swedish writer August Strindberg. It follows a power-seeking fisheries superintendent in the Stockholm Archipelago as he experiences personal success, isolation and downfall.

The novel was influenced by Friedrich Nietzsche's conception of decadence and has been associated with decadent and fin-de-siècle literature. Through its setting in the Stockholm Archipelago, it ties in thematically with Strindberg's novel The People of Hemsö (1887), short story collection Skärkarlsliv (1888) and short story "Silverträsket" (1898).

Albert Bonniers Förlag published the first edition on 31 October 1890 with a frontispiece by Carl Larsson. It was published in English translation in 1913, appearing in the United Kingdom as By the Open Sea and the United States as On the Seaboard: A Novel of the Baltic Islands.

By the Open Sea was the basis for Sveriges Television's 1971 television serial I havsbandet directed by Bengt Lagerkvist.
