= Ludvig Josephson =

Swedish dramatist, actor and theatre manager

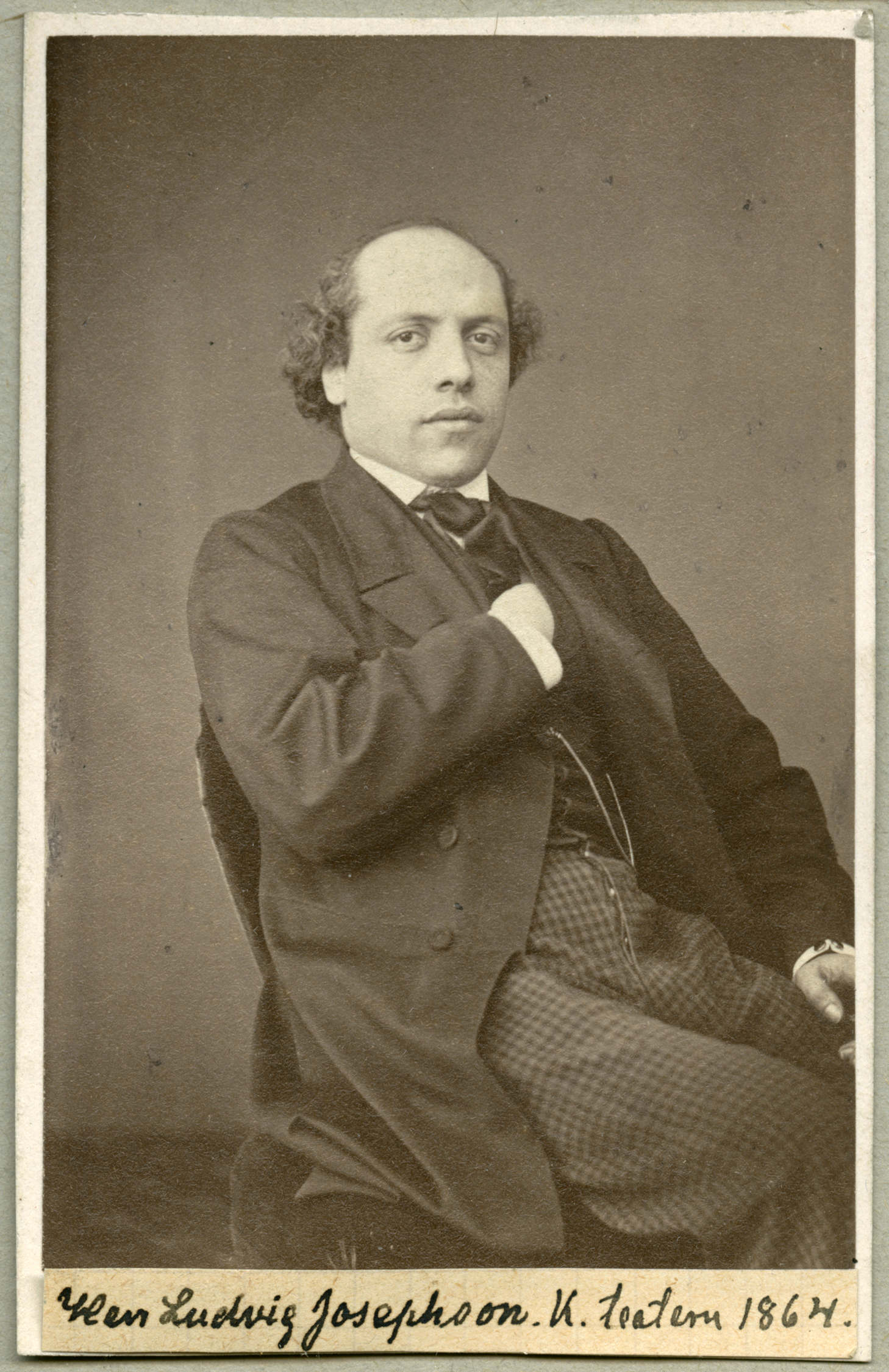
Ludvig Josephson (1864)

Ludvig Oskar Josephson (20 February 1832 – 29 January 1899) was a Swedish dramatist, actor and theatre manager.

== Biography ==
Ludvig Josephson was born in Stockholm, Sweden. He was the son of Jewish merchant Salomon Josephson and Beata Levin. He was the younger brother of composer Jacob Axel Josephson (1818-1880) and pianist Wilhelmina Josephson (1816-1906).

In 1851, he went to Paris, where he found employment with a major bookseller and came in contact with several French writers. His free time was spent on theatre studies, which included directing. From 1853 to 1854, he lived in Dresden, then returned home. In 1858, at the Mindre Teatern, he performed the title role in Narziss, a play based on Rameau's Nephew, by the German playwright Albert Emil Brachvogel. Three years later, he made his debut at the Royal Swedish Opera as Iago in Othello. He was employed there the same year and, in 1864, replaced August Bournonville as the stage curator. Later, he made adaptations of works by Shakespeare, Goethe, Adam Oehlenschläger, and others, as well as producing three of his own plays.

From 1868 to 1869, he worked with the decorative painter, Fritz Ahlgrensson, at the Mindre teatern, where an Italian opera company alternated with performances of Swedish dramatic works. This was followed by attempts at directing; partly in Gothenburg and partly at the Södra Teatern, where he worked with Ludvig Zetterholm. In 1871 and 1872, he was at the Ladugårdslandsteatern at Östermalmstorg in Stockhol. During this time, he also firmly established himself as playwright, producing several comedies and libretti.

He left Stockholm from 1873 to 1877 to lead the Christiania Theatre in Norway, where he introduced operatic productions. In 1879, he moved to the Swedish Theatre in Stockholm. The following year, he and the actor, Victor Holmquist, purchased it and produced plays there until 1890, including the premiere of Master Olof by August Strindberg. They presented many other recent foreign and domestic plays, as well as the classics, comic operas and operettas.

During the latter part of the 1890s, he served as director and, from 1895 to 1896, as secretary of the Royal Swedish Opera. In addition to his plays, he published brochures dealing with theatrical issues; such as the process of directing, the theatre's relationship with its critics, and a critical study of Henrik Ibsen. He died during 1899 in Stockholm.

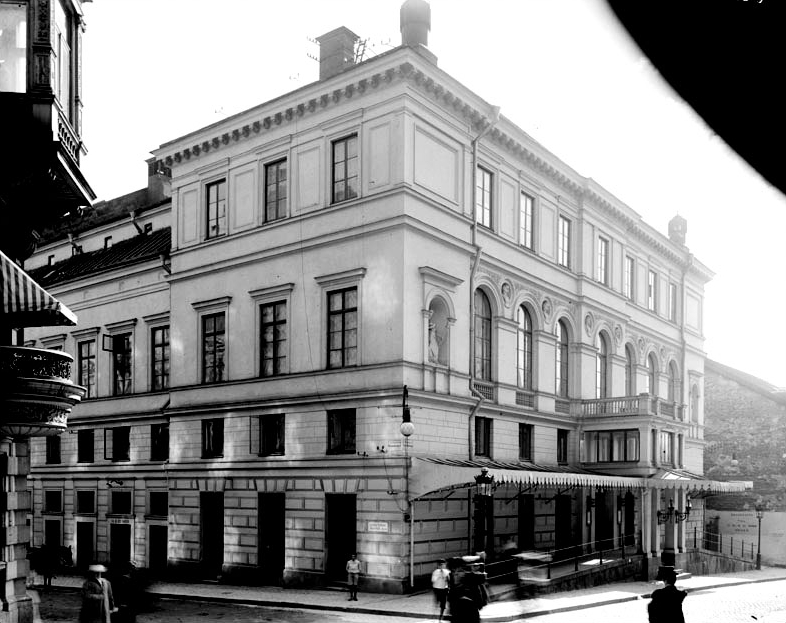
Swedish Theatre in the 1890s

== Other Sources ==
- Biography @ the Svenskt Biografiskt Lexikon
- Biography from the Nordisk familjebok @ Projekt Runeberg
