= Strindberg's Intimate Theater =

Coordinates: 59°20′7.8″N 18°3′13.9″E

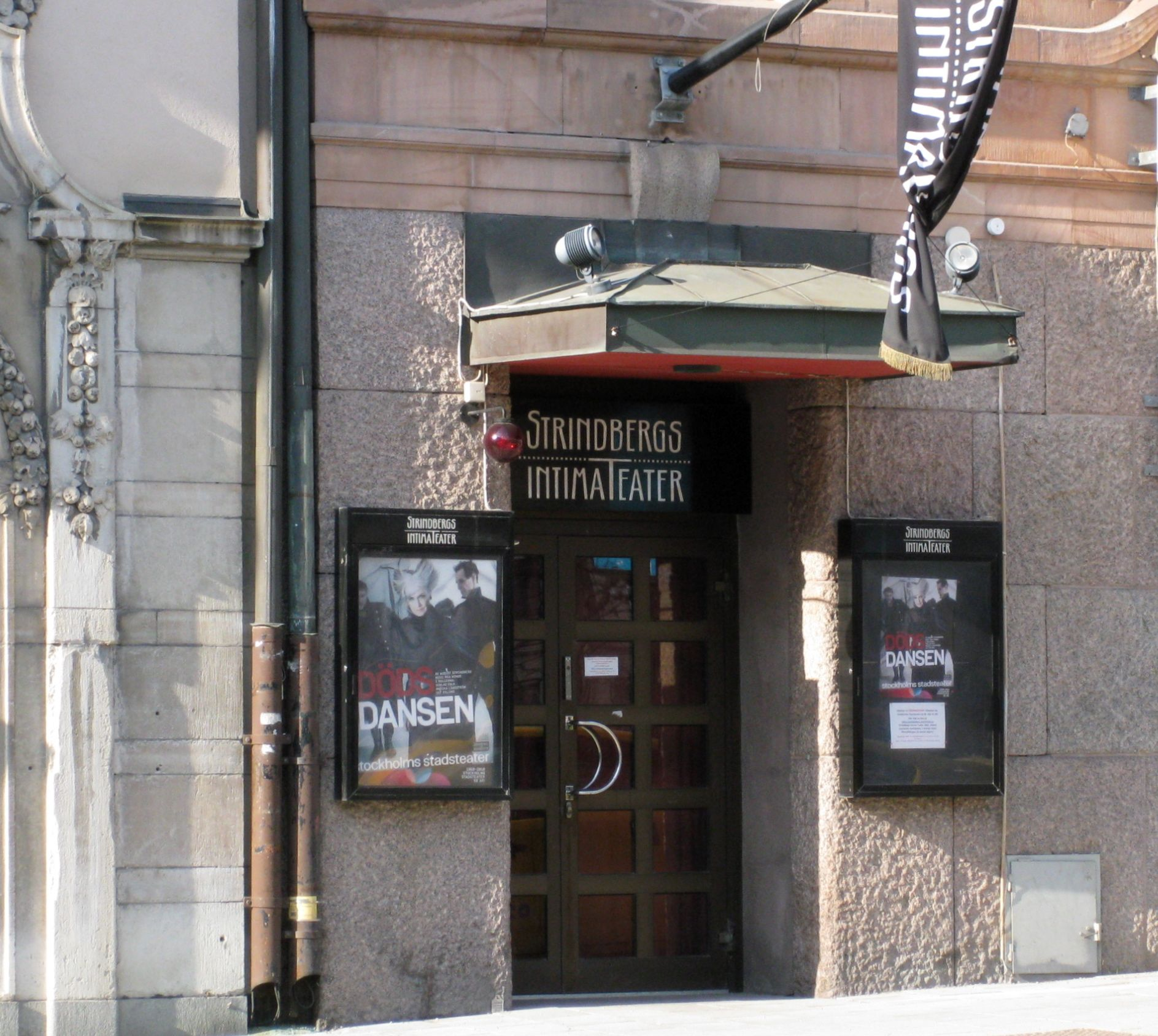
Strindberg's Intimate Theater

Strindberg's Intimate Theater (Swedish: Strindbergs Intima Teater or Intima teatern), is a theatre stage in Stockholm, Sweden.

== History ==
It was founded and managed by the famous Swedish playwright August Strindberg and the young actor August Falck (1882–1938) between 1907 and 1910. The playhouse was a small (6 x 6 meters) but engaging space based on the designs of the French and German models of the time. The small auditorium could hold up to 150 patrons and featured some of the most advanced lighting innovations of the day. The size of the space in no way limited the company but actually encouraged continuous experimentation. The author used the stage for his own plays as well as for guest performances of modern drama from abroad.

In all, 25 of Strindberg's plays were performed and a total number of 2500 performances were given during the theatre's short but highly influential existence. Among its most successful stagings were the original productions of Easter, The Ghost Sonata, Miss Julie and Svanevit. The theatre also triumphed on tour throughout Scandinavia and Europe.

After Strindberg's death in 1912 the theatre was locked up and remained closed for years. Between the 1920s–1980s it was used as an assembly hall for various trade union meetings and for public lectures.

In the early 1990s, however, the debate grew among theatre goers that Strindberg's old theatre deserved better. Discussions on how to make the theatre live again and have a permanent repertoire once more became lively, especially after the Strindberg Theatre Festival in 1993. Many theatre groups, businessmen and private people expressed their interest in a revival. Funds were raised in 1998 for renovations the theatre desperately needed. In 2001 the Culture Department in Stockholm took the initiative for its re-opening and production schedule.

The repertoire today consists of the theatre's own productions and those in association with the Royal Dramatic Theatre, of international guest performances and those from Swedish regional theatres, as well as theatre productions for schools and children.
