= August Strindberg bibliography =

This is a list of August Strindberg's written works.

== Bibliography ==
=== Drama ===
Plays
Year	Title	Type
1869	En namnsdagsgåva (A Namesday Gift)	Three-act
1869	Fritänkaren (The Free Thinker)	Three-act
1870	I Rom (In Rome)	One-act
1871	Hermione	Five-act
1871	Den fredlöse (The Outlaw)	One-act
1872	Mäster Olof (Master Olof)	Five-Act
1880	Gillets hemlighet (The Secret of the Guild)	Four-Act
1881	Anno fyrtiåtta (In the Year 1848)	Four-act
1882	Lycko-Pers resa (Lucky Peter's Travels)	Five-act
1882	Herr Bengt's hustru ("Sir Bengt's Wife")	Five-act
1886	Marodörer (Marauders)	
1887	The Father	Three-act
1887	Hemsöborna (Strindberg's adaption from his novel Natives of Hemsö)	Four-act
1888	Kamraterna (Comrades), adapted from Strindberg's Marodoerer with Axel Lundegard	Four-act
1888	Fröken Julie (Miss Julie)	One-act
1889	Fordringsägare (Creditors)	One-act
1889	Den starkare (The Stronger)	One-act
1889	Paria (Pariah)	One-act
1890	Samum	One-act
1892	Debet och kredit	One-act
1892	Himmelrikets nycklar; eller, Sankte Per vandrar pa jorden ( The Keys of the Kingdom of Heaven or St. Peter Wanders on Earth)	Five-act
1892	Inför döden (Facing Death)	One-act
1892	Moderskärlek (Motherly Love)	One-act
1893	Bandet (The Bond and the Link)	One-act
1893	Leka med elden (Playing with Fire)	One-act
1893	Första varningen (The First Warning)	One-act
1898	Till Damaskus, första delen (To Damascus, I)	Seven scenes
1898	Till Damaskus, andra delen (To Damascus, II)	Four-act
1898	Advent: Ett mysterium (Advent)	Five-act
1899	Vid högre rätt (At a Higher Court) Advent: Ett mysterium Brott och brott (There Are Crimes and Crimes)	
1899	Gustav Vasa	Five-act
1899	Erik XIV	Four-act
1899	Folkungasagan (The Saga of the Folkungs)	Five-act
1900	Gustaf Adolf	Five-act
1900	Påsk (Easter)	Three-act
1901	Engelbrekt	Four-act
1901	Midsommar (Midsummer)	six tableaux
1901	Kristina	Four-act
1901	Dödsdansen (The Dance of Death)	Two-Act
1901	Kronbruden (The Bridal Crown)	Six-part
1901	Svanevit	Three-act
1901	Ett drömspel (A Dream Play)	Fourteen scenes
1901	Kaspers fet-tisdag (Casper's Shrove Tuesday)	One-act
1901	Carl XII	
1902	Gustav III	Four-act
1903	The World History Plays Näktergalen i Wittenberg (The Nightingale of Wittenberg), five-act Through Deserts to Ancestral Lands Hellas The Lamb and the Beast	
1904	Till Damaskus, tredje delen (To Damascus, III)	Four-act
1907	The Chamber Plays, 1907 Oväder (The Storm) or (Storm Weather) Brända tomten (The Burned Site) or (The Burned House) Spöksonaten (The Ghost Sonata) or (Spook Sonata) Pelikanen (The Pelican)	
1908	Abu Casems tofflor (Abu Casem's Slippers)	
1908	Sista riddaren (The Last of the Knights)	Five-act
1909	Bjälbo-Jarlen (Earl Birger of Bjälbo)	Five-act
1909	Riksföreståndaren (The Regents)	Five-act
1909	Stora landsvägen (The Great Highway)	Verse
1909	Svarta handsken (The Black Glove)	Five-act

=== Posthumous ===
- The growth of a soul, translated by Claud Field, 1913
- På gott och ont (Of Good and Evil), 1914
- Genom öknar till arvland; eller, Moses (Through the Wilderness to the Promised Land; or, Moses) (Through Deserts to Ancestral Lands ), twenty-one tableaux, 1918
- Hellas; eller, Sokrates (Hellas; or, Socrates) (Hellas ), nineteen tableaux, 1918
- Lammet och vilddjuret; eller, Kristus (The Lamb and the Wild Beast; or, Christ) (The Lamb and the Beast ), fifteen tableaux, 1918
- Toten-Insel (Isle of the Dead), one scene, 1918
- Han och hon: En själs utvecklingshistoria (He and She: A soul's development history), 1919
- Efterspelet (Epilogue), 1920
- Strindbergs brev till Harriet Bosse: Natur & Kultur, 1932
- August Strindbergs och Ola Hanssons brevvåxling, 1938
- Åttitalsnoveller (Stories of the eighties), 1959
- Det sjunkande Hellas (Greece in Decline), three-act verse, 1960
- Brev till min dotter Kerstin, letters, 1961
- Ur ockulta dagboken, journals, 1963, edited by Torsten Eklund
- Hövdingaminnen, illustrations by Otte Sköld, 1963

=== Translations and adaptions ===
- Den starkare (1906), translated by Francis J. Ziegler as The Stronger in Poet Lore (V.17, n.1)
- Svanevit (1909), translated by Francis J. Ziegler as Swanwhite
- Fordringsägare (1910), translated by Francis J. Ziegler as The Creditor
- Moderskärlek (1910), translated by Francis J. Ziegler as Mother Love
- Inför döden (1911), translated by Olive Johnson as Facing Death
- Fröken Julie (1912), translated by Charles Recht as Countess Julia
- Paria (1912), translated by Bjoerkman and published in Plays by August Strindberg: Creditors, Pariah
- Le Plaidoyer d'un fou (1912), translated by Ellie Schleussner as The Confession of a Fool
- Inferno (1912), translated by Claud Field as The Inferno
- Giftas (1913), translated by Ellie Schleussner as Married
- Tjänstekvinnans son (1913), translated by Claud Field as The Son of a Servant, intro by Henry Vacher-Burch
- I havsbandet (1913), translated by Elizabeth Clarke Westergren as On the Seaboard: A Novel of the Baltic Islands
- Historiska miniatyrer (1913), translated by Claud Field as Historical Miniatures
- I havsbandet (1913), translated by Ellie Schleussner as By the Open Sea
- En blå bok (1913), translated by Claud Field as Zones of the Spirit: A Book of Thoughts, intro by Arthur Babillotte
- Samum (1914), translated by Horace B. Samuel and published in Paria [and] Simoon
- Advent: Ett mysterium (1914), translated by Claud Field as Advent
- På gott och ont (1914), translated by Claud Field as The Martyr of Stockholm
- Sagor (1930), translated by L. J. Potts as Tales
- Erik XIV (1931), translated by Joan Bulman and published in Master Olof and Other Plays
- Fröken Julie (1950), translated by C. D. Locock as Lady Julie
- Kristina,Carl XII, and Gustav III (1955), translated by W. Johnson and published in Queen Christina, Charles XII, [and] Gustav III
- Gustav Adolf (1957), translated by Walter Johnson as Gustav Adolf
- Påsk (1957), translated by Elizabeth Sprigge as Easter
- Hemsöborna (1959), translated by Elspeth Harley Schubert as The People of Hemso
- Öppna brev till Intima Teatern (1959), translated by W. Johnson as Open Letters to the Intimate Theatre
- Strindbergs brev till Harriet Bosse: Natur & Kultur (1959), translated by Arvid Paulson as Letters of Strindberg to Harriet Bosse
- Fröken Julie (1961), translated by E. M. Sprinchorn as Miss Julie
- Inferno (1912), translated by Mary Sandbach as Inferno
- Leka med elden (1963), translated by Michael Meyer as Playing With Fire
- Fröken Julie (1965), adapted by Ned Rorem as Miss Julie (opera)
- Hemsöborna (1965), translated by Arvid Paulson as Natives of Hemsö
- Ur ockulta dagboken (1965), translated by Mary Sandbach as From an Occult Diary: Marriage with Harriet Bosse
- Dödsdansen (1966), translated by Norman Ginsbury as The Dance of Death
- Tjänstekvinnans son (1966) translated by E. M. Sprinchorn as The Son of a Servant: The Story of the Evolution of a Human Being (1849–1867)
- Le Plaidoyer d'un fou (1967), translated by E. M. Sprinchorn as A Madman's Defense
- Syndabocken (1967), translated by Arvid Paulson as The Scapegoat
- Le Plaidoyer d'un fou (1968), translated by Anthony Swerling as A Madman's Manifesto
- Dance of Death (film) (1969), film starring Laurence Olivier
- Klostret (1969), translated by Mary Sandbach as The Cloister
- Miss Julie (1971); this version starred Helen Mirren
- Ensam (1971), translated by Arvid Paulson as Days of Loneliness
- Giftas (1972), translated by Mary Sandbach as Getting Married
- Sömngångarnätter och vakna dagar (verse) (1978) adapted by Arvid Paulson as Sleepwalking Nights and Wide-Awake Days and Biographical
- Taklagsöl (1987), translated by David Mel Paul and Margareta Paul in The Roofing Ceremony and The Silver Lake (another short story by Strindberg)
- Motherly Love / Pariah / The First Warning (1987), translated by Eivor Martinus. Amber Lane Press.
- En häxa (1991), translated by Mary Sandbach as A Witch
- The Chamber Plays (2004), translated by Eivor Martinus. Amber Lane Press.
- Kaspers Fet-Tisdag – ett Fastlagspel (2011), translated by Jonathan Howard as Casper's Fat Tuesday
- Herr Bengts hustru (2011), translated by Laurence Carr and Malin Tybåhl as Mr. Bengt’s Wife
- Erik XIV (2011), Karl II (2012) and Gustav Adolf (2013), translated by Wendy Weckwerth

=== Poetry, fiction, other, autobiography and other ===
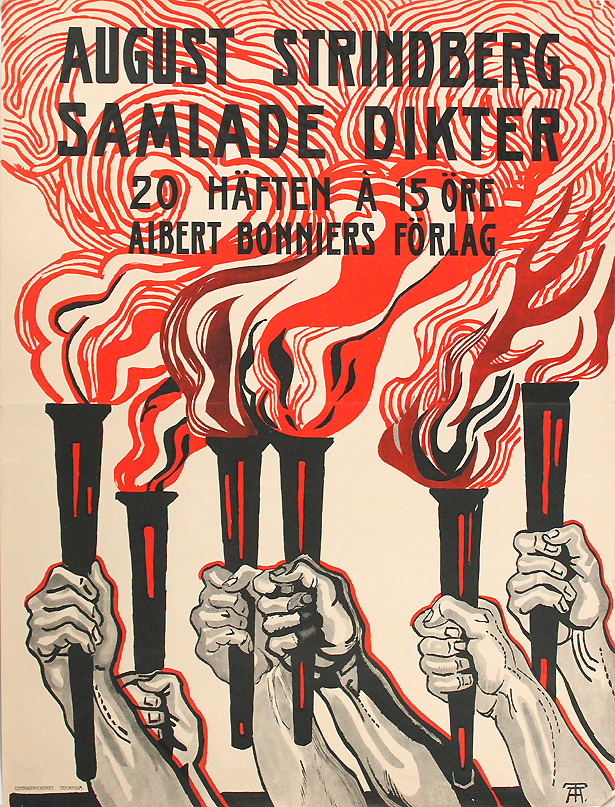
Poster by Axel Törneman for a 1911 poetry collection published by Albert Bonniers Förlag

- From Fjerdingen and Svartbäcken, short stories, 1877
- The Red Room, novel, 1879
- Gamla Stockholm (Old Stockholm), with Claes Lundin, cultural history, 1880
- I Vårbrytningen: Ungdomsarbeten, for children, Volumes I-VI, 1881
- Kulturhistoriska studier, 1881
- Dikter och verkligheter (Poems and Realities), verse and prose, 1881
- Svenska folket i helg och söcken, i krig och i fred, hemma och ute; eller, Ett tusen år av svenska bildningens och sedernas historia (The Swedish People on Holy Day and Everyday, in War and Peace, at Home and Abroad; or, A Thousand Years of the History of Swedish Culture and Manners), illustrations by Carl Larsson and C. E. Fritze, Volume I, 1881 and volume II, 1882
- Det nya riket (The New Kingdom), essay, 1882
- Svenska öden och äventyr (Swedish Destinies and Adventures), novel, 1883
- Dikter på vers och prosa (Poems in Verse and Prose), 1883
- Likt och olikt, 1884
- Sömngångarnätter och vakna dagar (verse), 1884
- August Strindbergs lilla katekes för underklassen, ≈1884
- Giftas (Married), two volumed short stories, Schleussner 1884–1886
- Kvarstadsresan (Journey into Detention), autobiography, 1885
- Utopier i verkligheten (Utopias in Reality), short stories, 1885
- Jäsningstiden (Time of Ferment), autobiographical novel, 1886
- Tjänstekvinnans son (The Son of a Servant), autobiography, 1886–1909
- Hemsöborna (The People of Hemsö), novel, 1887
- Vivisectioner, (Vivisections), essays includes On Psychic Murder, 1887
- Blomstermaalningar och djurstycken ungdomen tillaegnade (Flowers and Animals), popular science, 1888
- The Defence of a Fool (Le Plaidoyer d'un fou), 1888
- Tschandala, novel, 1888
- Skaerkarlslif: Beraettelser (Life in the Skerries), short story, 1888
- Bland franska boender (Among French Peasants), non-fiction, 1889
- Om modern drama och modern teater (On Modern Drama and the Modern Theatre), essay, 1889
- En haxa (A Witch), novel, 1890
- I havsbandet, novel, 1890
- Tryckt och otryckt (Printed and unprinted), plays, essays, and other writings, 1890–1897
- Les Relations de la France avec la Suede jusqu'a nos jours, 1891
- Antibarbarus, essays, 1892
- Jardin des plantes (Botanical Gardens), science, 1896
- Hortus Merlini: Lettres sur la chimie; Sylva sylvarum, 1897
- Inferno, novel/autobiography, 1897
- Svensk natur (Swedish Nature), 1897
- Legender (Legends: Autobiographical Sketches), 1898
- Klostret (Monastery), novel,1898
- Typer och prototyper inom mineralkemien: Festskrift till firandet af Berzelii femtioaarsminne, 1898
- Jakob brottas (Jacob Wrestling), journal, 1898
- Samvetsqval (Remorse), 1899
- Vaerldshistoriens mystik ((The Mysticism (or Mystique or Hidden Meaning) of World History)), essay, 1901
- Fagervik och Skamsund (Fair Haven and Foul Strand), 1902
- Ensam (Alone), novella, 1903
- Sagor (Fairy tales), stories, 1903
- Oeppna brev till Intima Teatern, essays, 1903
- Götiska rummen (Gothic Rooms), novel, 1904
- Historiska miniatyrer (Historical Thumbnails), fiction, 1905
- Ordalek och smaakonst (Word Play and Miniature Art), poems, 1905
- Taklagsoel, novella, 1907
- Syndabocken, novella, 1907
- Svarta fanor (Black Banners), novel, 1907
- Kammarspel, 1907
- En blaa bok (A Blue Book), essays and journal entries, four volumes, 1907–1912
- Fabler och smårre beråttelser (Fables and Minor Stories), 1909
- Shakespeares Macbeth, Othello, Romeo och Julia, Stormen, Kung Lear, Henrik VIII, En Midsommarnattsdröm (Shakespeare's Macbeth, Othello, Romeo and Juliet, The Tempest, King Lear, Henry VIII, A Midsummer Night's Dream), 1909
- Tal till Svenska Nationen om olust i landet, levernet, litteraturen och laerdomen ... Sjunde upplagan (Speeches to the Swedish Nation), 1910
- Författaren: En sjåls utvecklingshistoria (Author: A psychic development history), 1910
- Folkstaten: Studier till en stundande författningsrevision (People's State: Studies in a forthcoming Constitutional Court), 1910
- Modersmaalets anor (The Origins of Our Mother Tongue), essay,1910
- Vaerldspraakens roetter (The Roots of World Languages), 1910
- Religioes renaessans (Religious Renaissance), 1910
- Kina och Japan: Studier (China and Japan Studies), 1911
- Kinesiska språkets hårkomst (Chinese language descent), 1912
- Samlade skrifter (Collected Works), fifty-five volumes, edited by John Landquist

== See also ==
- List of paintings by August Strindberg

== Resources ==
- Nolin, Bertil (1999). Theatre Research International. New York City, New York: Cambridge University Press. ISSN 0307-8833.
- Contemporary Authors Online. Detroit: Gale. 2010. ISBN 978-0-7876-3995-2.
