= 1900 in literature =

This article contains information about the literary events and publications of 1900.

== Events ==
- March 5 – New York performances of the play Sapho are suspended for immorality; it is acquitted at a trial.
- March 15 – Sarah Bernhardt stars in the premiere of Edmond Rostand's l'Aiglon.
- May
  - Rainer Maria Rilke makes his second visit to the Russian Empire with Lou Andreas-Salomé and her husband.
  - The first film to feature the detective character Sherlock Holmes, Sherlock Holmes Baffled, is released by the American Mutoscope and Biograph Company.
- May 17 – L. Frank Baum's The Wonderful Wizard of Oz is published in Chicago, the first of Baum's books chronicling the fictional Land of Oz for children.
- June 24 – The Hanlin Academy in Peking, housing "the oldest and richest library in the world", catches fire and is destroyed during the Boxer Rebellion.
- June 25 – The Taoist monk Wang Yuanlu discovers the Dunhuang manuscripts in the Library Cave or Cave for Preserving Scriptures, No. 17 of the Mogao Caves in north-west China, where they have been sealed since the early 11th century.
- July 1 – The Net Book Agreement comes into force in the U.K: publishers will supply booksellers only on condition that they do not retail the supplied books at a discounted rate.
- October 15 – Mark Twain ends an absence from the United States of some nine years when he returns to New York aboard the Atlantic Transport Line steamship Minnehaha.
- November 1 – Ermete Novelli opens the "Casa di Goldoni", a new theatre in imitation of the Comédie Française, at Rome.
- November 19 – August Strindberg's To Damascus (Till Damaskus, first two parts) receives its premiere at the Royal Dramatic Theatre in Stockholm with August Palme and Harriet Bosse, Strindberg's future wife, in the leading rôles.
- unknown dates
  - In Austrian-Hungarian Bosnia, Osman Nuri Hadžić issues Behar, the first Bosnian Muslim literary journal, promoting liberal Islam within the Islamic revival movement.
  - The first film of Hamlet is an adaptation of the duel scene, with the French actress Sarah Bernhardt playing the title rôle.

== New books ==
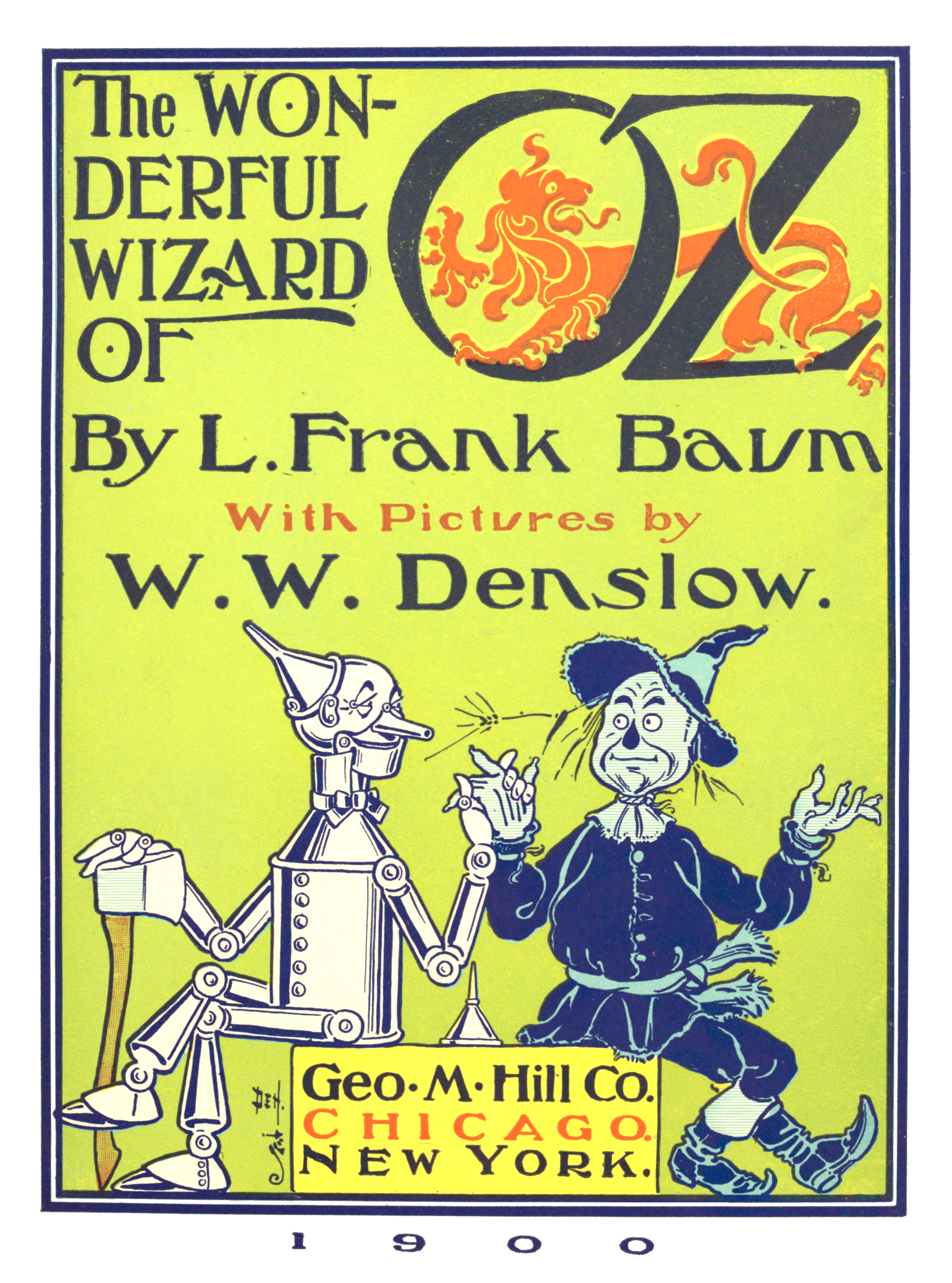
The first edition title page of one of the most prominent literary works of the year 1900, L. Frank Baum's The Wonderful Wizard of Oz.

=== Fiction ===
- F. Anstey – The Brass Bottle
- Pío Baroja – The House of Aizgorri (La casa de Aizgorri, first in trilogy The Basque Country (La Tierra Vasca)
- Mary Elizabeth Braddon – The Infidel
- Ernest Bramah – The Wallet of Kai Lung
- Colette – Claudine at School (Claudine à l'école)
- Joseph Conrad – Lord Jim
- Marie Corelli – The Master Christian
- Louis Couperus
  - Langs lijnen van geleidelijkheid
  - De stille kracht (The Hidden Force)
- Stephen Crane – Whilomville Stories
- Gabriele D'Annunzio – The Flame of Life (Il Fuoco)
- Theodore Dreiser – Sister Carrie
- Mary E. Wilkins Freeman – The Heart's Highway
- Robert Grant – Unleavened Bread
- Maurice Hewlett – The Life and Death of Richard Yea-and-Nay
- Jerome K. Jerome – Three Men on the Bummel
- Dmitry Merezhkovsky – The Romance of Leonardo da Vinci (Russian: Воскресшие боги. Леонардо да Винчи, literally Resurrected Gods: Leonardo da Vinci)
- Octave Mirbeau – The Diary of a Chambermaid (Le Journal d'une femme de chambre)
- F. D. J. Pangemanann – Tjerita Si Tjonat
- Bradford C. Peck – The World a Department Store
- I. L. Peretz – "Oyb Nisht Nokh Hekher" (If Not Higher; short story)
- Henryk Sienkiewicz – The Teutonic Knights (Krzyżacy)
- Flora Annie Steel
  - The Hosts of the Lord
  - Voices in the Night
- Booth Tarkington – Monsieur Beaucaire
- Frederik van Eeden – Van de koele meren des doods (From the Cool Lakes of Death)
- Jules Verne
  - The Will of an Eccentric
  - The Castaways of the Flag
- Mary Augusta Ward – Eleanor
- H. G. Wells – Love and Mr Lewisham
- Edith Wharton – The Touchstone
- W. W. Jacobs – "The Lady of the Barge"

=== Children and young people ===
- L. Frank Baum
  - A New Wonderland
  - The Wonderful Wizard of Oz
- Gelett Burgess – Goops, and How to Be Them (1st in the Goops series)
- Harriet Theresa Comstock – Molly, the Drummer Boy
- Andrew Lang – The Grey Fairy Book
- Emilio Salgari – The Tigers of Mompracem (Le Tigri di Mompracem)

=== Drama ===
- David Belasco – Madame Butterfly
- José Echegaray – El loco Dios (The Madman Divine)
- Sidney R. Ellis – The Watch on the Rhine
- Clyde Fitch – Captain Jinks of the Horse Marines
- Herman Heijermans – Op Hoop van Zegen
- James Herne – Sag Harbor
- Haralamb Lecca – Quarta. Jucătoriĭ de cărțĭ
- George Moore – The Bending of the Bough: a comedy in five acts
- Arthur Schnitzler – La Ronde (German: Reigen; privately printed)
- George Bernard Shaw – Captain Brassbound's Conversion
- August Strindberg
  - The Dance of Death (Dödsdansen)
  - Easter (Påsk)
  - To Damascus (Till Damaskus) opens in Sweden
- Hermann Sudermann – Fires of St. John

=== Musicals ===
- Owen Hall, Leslie Stuart – Florodora

=== Poetry ===
- G. K. Chesterton – The Wild Knight and Other Poems
- Arthur Quiller-Couch, ed. – The Oxford Book of English Verse 1250–1900
- Sir Walter Scott (died 1832; ed. by Andrew Lang) – The Poems and Ballads
- Ismail Hossain Shiraji – Anal Prabaha

=== Non-fiction ===
- Mirza Muhammad Yusuf Ali – Nur al-Iman
- William "Cocktail" Boothby – The World's Drinks And How To Mix Them
- Winston Churchill
  - Ian Hamilton's March
  - London to Ladysmith via Pretoria
- Arthur Conan Doyle – The Great Boer War
- Nicolae Iorga
  - Opinions sincères (Sincere Opinions)
  - Opinions pérnicieuses d'un mauvais patriote (Pernicious Opinions of a Poor Patriot)
- Gertrude Jekyll – Home and Garden
- Andrew Lang
  - A History of Scotland, vol. 1
  - Prince Charles Edward
- Guide Michelin (1st issue)
- Joaquim Nabuco – My Formation (Minha formação)
- The Nuttall Encyclopaedia (editor James Wood)
- José Enrique Rodó – Ariel
- Samuel Marinus Zwemer – Arabia: The Cradle of Islam

== Births ==
- January – Elisabeth Inglis-Jones, Welsh novelist and biographer (died 1994)
- January 9
  - Emmanuel D'Astier, French journalist (died 1969)
  - Eve Garnett, English children's writer and illustrator (died 1991)
- January 11 – Borden Chase, American writer (died 1971)
- January 15 – William Heinesen, Faroese writer (died 1991)
- January 21 – Jack Hilton, English writer (died 1983)
- January 31 – Clare Hoskyns-Abrahall, English biographer and children's writer (died 1990)
- February 4 – Jacques Prévert, French poet (died 1977)
- February 19 – Giorgos Seferis, Greek poet and diplomat, recipient of Nobel Prize in Literature in 1963 (died 1971)
- February 22 – Seán Ó Faoláin, Irish short story writer (died 1991)
- March 3 – Basil Bunting, Englsih modernist poet (died 1985)
- March 7 – Benn Levy, English playwright and politician (died 1973)
- March 15 – Gilberto Freyre, Brazilian author (died 1987)
- April 19 – Richard Hughes, English novelist (died 1976)
- April 20 – Constantin S. Nicolăescu-Plopșor, Romanian anthropologist, ethnographer and children's writer (died 1968)
- April 22 – Vyvyan Adams (Watchman), English writer and politician (died 1951)
- April 24 – Elizabeth Goudge, English novelist and children's author (died 1984)
- April 26 – Roberto Arlt, Argentine novelist, playwright and journalist (died 1942)
- April 28 – Antonieta Rivas Mercado, Mexican feminist writer and patron of the arts (died 1931)
- May 1 – Ignazio Silone, Italian author and politician (died 1978)
- May 6 – Garrett Mattingly, American historian (died 1962)
- May 24 – Eduardo De Filippo, Italian author (died 1984)
- May 28 – Nan Chauncy, English-born Australian children's writer (died 1970)
- June 7 – Jan Engelman, Dutch writer (died 1972)
- June 11 – Leopoldo Marechal, Argentine writer (died 1970)
- June 19 – Ștefan Voitec, Romanian politician and journalist (died 1984)
- June 25 – Gerald Drayson Adams, English screenwriter (died 1988)
- June 29 – Antoine de Saint-Exupéry, French novelist (died 1944)
- July 2 – Tyrone Guthrie, English theatrical director (died 1971)
- July 18 – Nathalie Sarraute, Russian-born Francophone lawyer and writer (died 1999)
- July 24 – Zelda Fitzgerald, American author (died 1948)
- August 10 – Charles Shaw, Australian writer (died 1955)
- August 17 – Mary Paik Lee, Korean-American writer (died 1995)
- August 20 – Salvatore Quasimodo, Italian poetm recipient of Nobel Prize for Literature in 1959 (died 1968)
- September 7 – Taylor Caldwell, Anglo-American novelist (died 1985)
- September 9 – James Hilton, English novelist (died 1954)
- September 17 – Martha Ostenso, Norwegian-born Canadian novelist and screenwriter (died 1963)
- September 23 – Jaroslav Seifert, Czech writer, poet and journalist, winner of Nobel Prize for Literature in 1984 (died 1986
- October 3 – Thomas Wolfe, American novelist (died 1938)
- October 16 – Edward Ardizzone, English children's writer and illustrator (died 1979)
- October 30 – Xia Yan (夏衍), Chinese playwright and screenwriter (died 1995)
- November 8 – Margaret Mitchell, American novelist (died 1949)
- November 19 – Anna Seghers, German writer (died 1983)
- December 8 – Ants Oras, Estonian writer (died 1982)
- December 16 – V. S. Pritchett, English short story writer (died 1997)

== Deaths ==
- January 4 – Stanisław Mieroszewski, Polish-born politician, historian and writer (born 1827)
- January 11 – James Martineau, English religious philosopher (born 1805)
- January 19 – William Larminie, Irish poet and folklorist (born 1849)
- January 20
  - R. D. Blackmore, English novelist (born 1825)
  - John Ruskin, English art critic, social thinker, artist and poet (born 1819)
- January 25 – Frederick H. Chapin, American author and explorer (born 1852)
- February 6 – Elijah Benamozegh, Italian spiritual writer and rabbi (born 1822)
- February 14 – Giovanni Canestrini, Italian scientist, essayist and translator (born 1835)
- February 18 – Eugenio Beltrami, Italian mathematician and theorist (born 1835)
- February 23 – Ernest Dowson, English poet and novelist (born 1867)
- March 11 – Joseph Louis François Bertrand, French mathematics writer (born 1822)
- March 30 – David Léon Cahun, French Orientalist and writer (born 1841)
- April 5 – Maria Louise Eve, American author (born 1842)
- April 12 – James Richard Cocke, American author and hypnotherapist (born 1863)
- April 21 – Charles Beecher, American composer, minister and writer (born 1815)
- April 23 – Charles Isaac Elton, English historian, politician and writer (born 1839)
- April 27 – Francišak Bahuševič, Belarusian poet, writer and lawyer (born 1840)
- April 30 – George Campbell, 8th Duke of Argyll, Scottish politician and writer (born 1823)
- May 4 – Hugo Badalić, Croatian writer and scholar (born 1851)
- May 20 – André Léo, French novelist and journalist (born 1824)
- May 28 – Sir George Grove, English writer and lexicographer on music (born 1820)
- June 2 – Clarence Cook, American author and art critic (born 1828)
- June 3 – Mary Kingsley, English travel writer and explorer (born 1862)
- June 4 – Edwards Amasa Park, American theologian, pastor and writer (born 1808)
- June 5 – Stephen Crane, American writer, journalist and poet (born 1871)
- June 12 – Lucretia Peabody Hale, American journalist and author (born 1820)
- June 19 – Salvador Camacho, Colombian economist, politician and writer (born 1827)
- July 3 – Fernand Brouez, Belgian editor and founder of La Société Nouvelle (born 1861)
- July 6 – Gustav Jacob Born, German medical author and histologist (born 1851)
- July 22 – Lucius E. Chittenden, American writer and politician (born 1824)
- July 29 – Henry Spencer Ashbee, English writer and bibliographer (born 1834)
- August 2 – Sydney Robert Bellingham, Irish-Canadian journalist and politician (born 1808)
- August 16 – José Maria de Eça de Queiroz, Portuguese novelist (born 1845)
- August 25 – Friedrich Nietzsche, German philosopher and philologist (born 1844)
- August 28 – Henry Sidgwick, English philosopher (born 1838)
- September 18 – Anne Beale, Welsh novelist and poet (born 1816)
- September 29 – Samuel Fenton Cary, American author and prohibitionist (born 1814)
- October 13 – Louis Adolphe Cochery, French journalist and politician (born 1819)
- October 20
  - Naim Frashëri, Albanian poet (born 1846)
  - Charles Dudley Warner, American writer (born 1829)
- October 27 – James Henry Bowker, South African naturalist (born 1822)
- November 12 – F. Burge Griswold, American poet and short story writer (born 1826)
- November 12 – Thomas Arnold the Younger, English literary scholar (born 1823)
- November 14 – Matthew J. Royal, Canadian novelist and playwright (born 1863)
- November 16 – Isidore Barthe, French-Canadian journalist and translator (born 1834)
- November 27 – David Carnegie, Australian travel writer (born 1871)
- November 30 – Oscar Wilde, Irish poet, dramatist and short story writer (born 1854)
- December 15 – Charles Cotesworth Beaman, American lawyer and author (born 1840)
- December 30 – Henry Ames Blood, American poet, dramatist and historian (born 1836)
- December 31 – Oscar Alin, Swedish historian, politician and author (born 1846)
- unknown date – Berdakh, Uzbek poet (born 1827)

== See also ==
- 1900 in poetry
- List of years in literature
