= Fahlstrøm =

Fahlstrøm or Fahlström or Fahlstrom is a surname. Notable people with the surname include:

- Öyvind Fahlström (1928–1976), Swedish Multimedia artist
- Alma Fahlstrøm (1863–1946), born in Denmark, Norwegian actress and theatre manager, wife of Johan Fahlstrøm
- Jacob Fahlström (1795–1859), the first Swede ever to settle in Minnesota
- Johan Fahlstrøm (1867–1938), Norwegian actor and theatre manager, husband of Alma Fahlstrøm
- Kristian Fahlstrøm (1917–2005), Norwegian newspaper editor
