= August Strindberg Repertory Theatre =

Resident company at the Gene Frankel Theatre in New York City

Coordinates: 40.726573°N 73.993708°W

The August Strindberg Repertory Theatre is the resident company at the Gene Frankel Theatre. The company is dedicated to bringing the plays of August Strindberg to an American audience.

== 2012–13 Season ==
The August Strindberg Repertory Theatre became the resident company at the Gene Frankel Theatre in New York City's East Village when it transferred its first production, Strindberg's Playing with Fire (co-produced by the Negro Ensemble Company), there in June 2012 after an initial run at the New School's theatre in the West Village. Playing with Fire received three Audelco Award nominations, for Outstanding Ensemble Performance, Best Revival and Best Costume Design. The cast consisted of Nathan James, Tocarra Cash, Elizabeth Flax, Jolie Garrett, Jaleesa Capri and James Edward Becton.

Its second production was a double bill of Casper's Fat Tuesday and The Stronger, and its third Easter. Casper's Fat Tuesday was co-produced by the Pink Pig Ballet and was an English-language premiere, translated by Jonathan Howard. In The Stronger Dina Rosenmeier played "Mrs X" and Albert Bendix " Mr Y". The Easter cast consisted of Chudney Sykes, Nathan James, DeSean Stokes, Carol Carter, Ley Smith, and Jolie Garrett. All first-season productions were directed by the company's artistic director, Robert Greer.

== 2013–14 Season ==
Mr. Bengt's Wife, a work never before translated, previewed on Friday, September 13, 2013, and opened two days later. Malin Tybåhl and Prof. Laurence Carr are the translators. This was the first production to employ a guest director, Craig Baldwin, associate artistic director of the Red Bull Theater. The cast were Kersti Bryan, Samm Todd, Victoria Blankenship, Matthew Hurley, Eric Percival and Shawn Fagan. (Note: A Strindberg Rarity -- Mr. Bengt's Wife -- An Answer to Ibsen's A Doll's House? by Melody Breyer-Grell, Huffington Post, September 19, 2013)

The spring production was To Damascus, part one (parts two and three are projected for performance in 2015, as is Kristina). The cast included DeSean Stokes, Kersti Bryan, Nathan James, Carol Carter, Victor Arnez, Victoria Blankenship and Allen Kennedy. The Deadly Dance, Fred Crecca's adaptation of The Dance of Death was presented as on three Wednesdays with Mary Keefe, Louis Vuolo and Dennis Davies.

== 2014–15 Season ==
Miss Julie featured a biracial cast and the previously unstaged ballet, for which Strindberg provided a scenario in the original script in October 2014. Ivette Dumeng performed the title role, Reginald L. Wilson that of John and Eboni Flowers as Christine in Edgar Chisholm's adaptation, set in Louisiana in 1888, the year the play was written. Ja' Malik made the dance.

Kristina was presented in March 2015 with Ms Dumeng again in the title role in a new translation by Wendy Weckwerth, directed by associate artistic director Whitney Gail Aronson. Eric C. Bailey, Martin Boersma, Sergio Castillo, Michael Sean Cirelli, Amy Fulgham, Al Foote III, Daniel Mian, David Mohr, Christine Nyland, Jonathan Olivera, Brent Shultz, Steve Shoup and Jacob Troy constituted the remainder of the cast. Mr Boersma was the fight director, Dara Swisher choreographer.

== 2015–16 Season ==
Strindberg's Chamber Plays, opus nos. 1 and 2, Storm and Burnt House were presented on alternate nights in the Fall.

Damascus II was performed in the Spring with a mixed-race cast.

== 2016–17 Season ==
Stig Dagerman's Marty's Shadow, translated by Lo Dagerman and Nancy Pick, was performed in rep' with Stig Dalager's Journey in Light and Shadow, translated by Robert Greer and adapted by Natlie Menna.

Strindberg's Motherlove was presented at the Lower East Side Festival at Theater for the New City.

== 2017–18 Season ==
Hrafnhildur Hagalin's Guilty was presented at the Dreamup Festival at Theater for the New City.

== Stage readings ==
The company also presented stage readings of Erik XIV, Gustav Adolf and Karl XII in new translations by Ms. Weckwerth on Wednesdays during the September 2013 run of Mr. Bengt's Wife, and were directed by Linda Nelson, Ms. Aronson, and Ms. Dumeng (artistic director of Nylon Fusion Collective), respectively.

== Staff ==
=== Resident playwrights ===
- Edgar Chisholm
- Natalie Menna

=== Dramaturgs ===
Prof. Eszter Szalczer and Janet Bentley are company dramaturgs.

=== Stage managers ===
Stage managers for "Easter" and "To Damascus I" were Michael Petre-Zumbrun and Karimah (Bill Johnson and Karimah for Playing with Fire and Sidney Branch and Michael Petre-Zumbrun for Casper's Fat Tuesday and The Stronger). Noelle Semodo and Nikeem Pearson were stage managers for "Miss Julie", and "Hannah Delmore was production stage manager and Robertson Tirado assistant stage manager on Kristina.

=== Designers and technicians ===
All productions through Miss Julie had lighting designed by Miriam Crowe.

Kate Noll designed the set for Kristina, Lance Harkins and Mikhail Poloskin the set and graphics for Miss Julie. Angelina Margolis was a scenic artist for Playing with Fire and Easter and designed the set for Mr Bengt's Wife, both set and costumes for Casper's Fat Tuesday and The Stronger.

Jessa-Raye Court designed costumes for Storm and Kristina, Niimar Felder for Miss Julie, Kate DaRocha for To Damascus part one, Aryeh Lappin for Mr Bengt's Wife, Caitlin Dixon for Easter and Lora Jackson for Playing with Fire.

You-Shin Chen designed props for Kristina and sets for Storm, Burnt House and Damascus II. Andy Evan Cohen designed sound on To Damascus parts I and II, Miss Julie and Kristina.

Benjamin Briones was a master carpenter on Playing with Fire and Casper's Fat Tuesday.
