= Reidar Otto =

Norwegian theater director

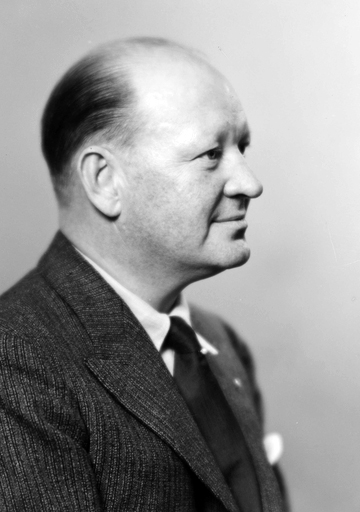
- Reidar Otto in 1934
- Born: December 9, 1890; Chicago
- Died: May 10, 1959 (aged 68); Oslo, Norway
- Occupation: Theater director
- Spouse: Sigrun Otto
- Parents: Harald Otto (father); Ignatzia Otto (mother)

Reidar Otto (December 9, 1890 – May 10, 1959) was a Norwegian theater director.

Otto was born in Chicago, the son of the actor and theater director Harald Otto and the actress Ignatzia Otto. He studied theater and signing at schools in Dresden, Rome, and Stockholm. He became the director of the Norwegian Students' Society Theater in 1916, and then the co-director of the Central Theater in 1919 together with his father Harald Otto, who took it over in 1902. Reidar Otto led the theater from 1928 to 1948 and then turned it over to his son Harald Ottho (1920–2001). The family's leadership of the theater ended in 1959, the year Reidar Otto died. After the Second World War, Otto was chairman of the Norwegian Theater Directors' Association. He also led the Private Theater Directors' Association and was a board member of the Christiania Theater History Museum. He was married to the actress Sigrun Otto.
