= Johan Fahlstrøm =

Norwegian actor

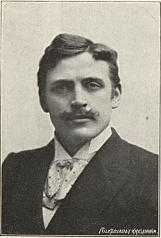
- Born: Johan Peter Broust Fahlstrøm; 30 August 1867; Trondheim, United Kingdoms of Sweden and Norway
- Died: 28 July 1938 (aged 70); Balestrand, Norway
- Occupation(s): Actor, theatre manager
- Known for: Co-founder of Oslo Centralteatret
- Spouse: Alma Bosse (m. 1889)
- Children: 1

Johan Peter Broust Fahlstrøm (30 August 1867 – 28 July 1938) was one of Norway's leading male actors before World War I.

Johan Fahlstrøm was born in Trondheim, Norway. He debuted as an actor at the Christiania Theatre in 1887 in the play Julius Caesar by William Shakespeare. Fahlstrøm was employed at the Christiania Theater from 1887 to 1897 and at the National Theatre from 1899 to 1903.

In 1889, Johan Fahlstrøm married the actress Alma Isabella Bosse, who was the sister of the actress Harriet Bosse and sociologist Ewald Bosse. In 1897, the couple opened the Central Theater in Christiania (now Oslo) with both concert and vaudeville venues. Fahlstrøm appeared in a variety of roles and his wife served as director. From 1902 onward, Harald Otto (1865–1928) was the theater manager and owner. Fahlstrøm featured a farewell performance of The Pillars of Society by Henrik Ibsen in 1911, after which he decided to retire from the stage.

The couple's only child, Arne Jonas Fahlstrøm, was born in 1893. He died in the Titanic disaster in 1912. Because they had no other children, they willed their fortune to the Norwegian Sea Rescue Society, which used the funds to purchase rescue boats that were named in honor of the couple's son.
