= The Road to Damascus =

The Road to Damascus may refer to:

- Conversion of Paul the Apostle, an event in the Christian Bible
- "The Road To Damascus", an episode of Carnivàle
- To Damascus, a trilogy of plays by the Swedish playwright August Strindberg
- The Road to Damascus (film), a 1952 French adventure film
