= Sigrun Otto =

Norwegian actress (1896–1980)

- Born: April 13, 1896; Kristiania, Norway
- Died: August 15, 1980 (aged 84); Oslo, Norway
- Occupation: Actress
- Spouse: Reidar Otto
- Parents: Otto Enersen (father); Thora Emilie Enersen (mother)

Sigrun Otto (a.k.a. Sigrun Enersen Otto, April 13, 1896 – August 15, 1980) was a Norwegian actress. She was married to the theater director Reidar Otto.

Otto was born in Kristiania (now Oslo), the daughter of Otto Enersen and Thora Emilie Enersen. She debuted in 1912 and was employed at the Central Theater from 1914 to 1959. She married Reidar Otto in 1919. In addition to theater roles, she also appeared in several Norwegian films, and she played roles in NRK's Television Theater and Radio Theater departments.

== Filmography ==
- 1942: Jeg drepte!, Miss Bull
- 1946: Vi vil leve
- 1946: To liv, Else Nordgaard, Ivar Nordgaard's wife
- 1947: Sankt Hans fest, Mrs. Christensen
- 1951: Kranes konditori, Mrs. Breien
- 1951: Skadeskutt, Else's mother
- 1952: Trine!, Mrs. Jahnfeldt, Jens's mother
- 1953: Brudebuketten, conscientious mother
- 1955: The Summer Wind Blows, Klaus's mother
- 1959: Støv på hjernen
- 1960: Ungen (TV), Lagerta
- 1961: Den evige ektemann (TV), Marja Syssojevna
- 1963: Elskere, Gudleik's mother
- 1964: Alle tiders kupp, Kari's mother
- 1964: Nydelige nelliker, milk woman
