= Haugtussa (Grieg) =

Song cycle composed by Edvard Grieg

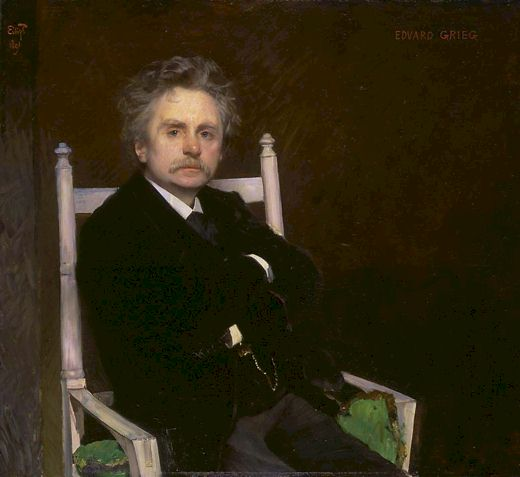
Composer Edvard Grieg, portrait by Eilif Peterssen (1891)

Haugtussa, Op. 67, or The Mountain Maid, is a song cycle for soprano and piano composed by Edvard Grieg in 1895 and published in 1898. Even though Grieg wrote a total of 181 songs, this is the only song cycle in his entire output. The text was written by the Norwegian writer Arne Garborg, an excerpt from his book of poetry Haugtussa. It tells the story of Haugtussa, a young herding girl, and her first love affair with a boy, her first heartache. Both the lyrics, which brim over with imagery of gurgling brooks and tasty blueberries, and the music that mimics this imagery, intertwine the main character’s personal story and the mystic spring-like landscape that surrounds her, which may even motivate it.

== Song cycle project ==
Edvard Grieg read Arne Garborg's Haugtussa in May 1895, and was so inspired that he composed twelve songs in a month, four of which he rejected. He then spent three years completing the project. He first conceived it as a larger work with orchestra, but in 1898 decided to set just a cycle of eight songs for voice and piano, and gave them a final polish before they were printed in September that year. Grieg wanted Haugtussa to reflect Garborg's poems, but by using only a few selected poems was able to give a true and complete new image to Haugtussa, thus creating a new whole. They were released in Nynorsk and Danish, translated by John Paulsen and Grieg and published by Wilhelm Hansen in Copenhagen, translated to German by Eugen von Enzberg, and in English, published by Edition Peters in Leipzig.

=== Songs ===
The cycle is of eight songs:

1. The Enticement (Det syng) – Haugtussa is dreaming
2. Young Maiden (Veslemøy) – A description of the slender Haugtussa
3. Blueberry Slope (Blåbærli) – Haugtussa is watching over her flock and sees a field of blueberries
4. The Tryst (Møte) – Haugtussa looks out upon the hill and sees the boy of her dreams
5. Love (Elsk) – Haugtussa declares her love for the boy
6. Kidlings' Dance (Killingdans) – Haugtussa dances with her flock of goats
7. Hurtful Day (Vond dag) – A rainy day; he promised he would come, but she sat there alone
8. At the Brook (Ved Gjætle-Bekken) – Haugtussa sits by the brook speaking to it of her sadness

F major functions as a default tonic in the cycle, serving as the main key figure in the first, third and fourth songs, leaving the fifth to be constructed in C major and the seventh in F minor. A major appears only once in the cycle, during the opening bars of the fourth song, which is strikingly noticeable within the tonal design of the entire song cycle.

=== Contents ===
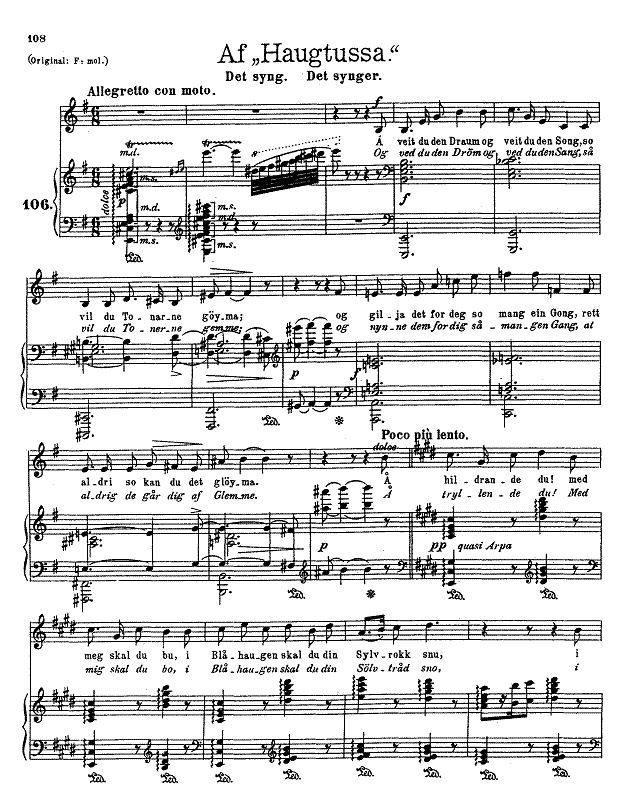
Music score of Haugtussa, The Mountain Maid, by Edvard Grieg, published in 1898

Haugtussa opens and ends with the nature mysticism of "The Enticement" and "At the Brook". The second extended stage includes the two melancholic portraits "Veslemøy" and "Hurtful Day". Between them the climax is reached in the central love songs "The Tryst" and "Love", which have a cheerful, pastoral approach, and approached and transitioned from in, respectively, "Blueberry Slope" and "Kidlings' Dance". The main character, the Veslemøy, is a shepherd girl who has abilities that others do not have and therefore can not find a place for her personality in rural communities. She turns to nature for answers to her desires and questions. During the course of the text she falls in love with the boy Jon, and "Hurtful Day" describes her feelings when she is deceived by him. In the last song, "At the Brook", which is often compared with the last song of Franz Schubert's Die schöne Müllerin or Robert Schumann's Dichterliebe, she seeks refuge by a mountain brook, musically represented by a rhythmic figure on the piano. From verse to verse, Grieg gradually changes this passage using different harmonizations.

=== Performances ===
The first to perform the complete cycle of songs in Christiania was Eva Nansen, wife of the Norwegian explorer Fridtjof Nansen, with Grieg's colleague and friend Agathe Backer-Grøndahl at the piano, on 2 November 1899. Grieg was not present at the recital, for he had a concert in Stockholm at the same time. Four of the Haugtussa songs were also performed on 22 October 1898 by the Norwegian-born Swedish singer Dagmar Möller, to whom the cycle was dedicated.

=== Selected recordings ===
- Kirsten Flagstad with Edwin McArthur, piano. Recorded three times: 27 August 1940 and 26 April 1950, both for RCA Victor; and 22–30 November 1956 for Decca.
- Aase Nordmo Løvberg with Robert Levin, piano. Recorded in Oslo around March 1956 for His Master's Voice. Released on the EP-disc 7EBN 1.
- Anne Sofie von Otter with Bengt Forsberg, piano. Recorded in 1992 for Deutsche Grammophon.
- Lise Davidsen with Leif Ove Andsnes, piano. Recorded in 2021 for Decca.

== Additional information ==
=== Sources ===
- Erling Dahl Jr.: Haugtussa, Opus 67, "The best songs I've written" at the Grieg Society.org (in Norwegian)
- Frode B. Bjerkevik: Edvard Grieg – Haugtussa at Hissig.no (in Norwegian)
- Debra Siebert, D.M.A.: Conflict and meaning in Edvard Grieg's "Haugtussa", University of Nevada, Las Vegas, 2010, AAT 3460100
