= Dagmar Möller =

Swedish singer (soprano) and vocal pedagogue

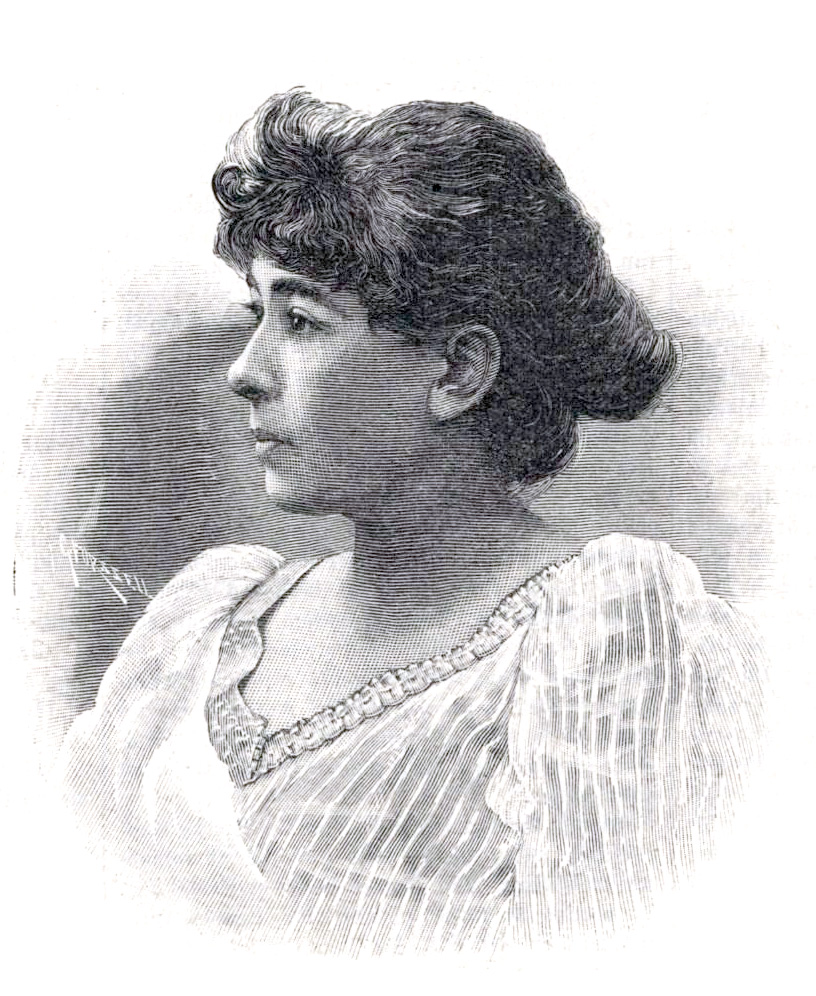
Dagmar Möller. Xylography 1893.

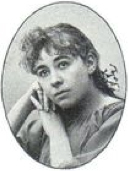
Portrait of Swedish singer Dagmar Möller.

Dagmar Möller (born Dagmar Henriette Bosse; 19 December 1866 – 13 January 1956), was a Swedish singer (soprano) and vocal pedagogue. She was the dedicatee of Edvard Grieg's song cycle Haugtussa and took past in many theatrical productions during her musical career.

== Life ==
Möller studied at the Stockholm Conservatory between 1882 and 1887, and was employed at the Royal Theatre from 1887 to 1894. Dagmar Möller studied with Désirée Artôt in Paris and made her debut at the Royal Swedish Opera in 1887. She had great success in comic roles in Stockholm and in Oslo between 1891 and 1893. She was a teacher of singing at the Music Conservatory from 1900 to 1926 and at the University College of Opera from 1903 to 1913, as well as in theatrical productions from 1900 to 1913. She was also of great significance for the spreading of Nordic novel songs and sang works by Grieg. He dedicated to her his Haugtussa songs, published in 1898. She also had songs by Emil Sjögren, Wilhelm Stenhammar, and Peterson-Berger in her repertoire.

Dagmar Möller was elected to the Royal Swedish Academy of Music as member 507 on 26 March 1903, and was awarded the Litteris et Artibus in 1911. Möller married in 1888 the musician Adolf Teodor Sterky and in 1896 the architect General Carl Möller. She was the sister of Harriet Bosse and Alma Fahlstrøm.
