= Haugtussa =

Epic poems by Arne Garborg

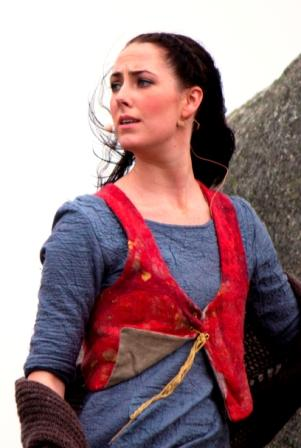
Gerd Elin Birkeland as Veslemøy at Knudaheio, 2011.

Haugtussa (edited 1895) is an epic circle of poems, written by the Norwegian author Arne Garborg. The poems are reckoned a classical example of Norwegian Neo-romanticism or Symbolism. The themes of the poems are closely related to Garborg's rural background, and a number of supernatural beings, like the draug, the hulderpeople and other creatures, are involved. A Haugtusse is originally a female subterrestrial (a Hulder), but in this story it is an eponym of the main character, a psychic young girl, usually called Veslemøy. In 1900 Garborg published a sequel, I Helheim ("In Hel").

== Plot ==
Veslemøy (or Gislaug), is the youngest of three sisters, living alone with her elderly mother in the area of Jæren. Her oldest sister is dead, and her other sister went to town, possibly falling into prostitution. The family is poor, and is sometimes harassed by the local land-owner.

Veslemøy is known to have great insight in local tradition and folklore, and the other youths often gather around her to hear her tell stories, or to conduct riddle-games. Veslemøy also shows skills in the art of making stories herself. One night, her dead sister visits her, telling her that she is appointed to "see" more than others, to be psychic, and to predict. This is a great burden to her, but she takes it on, rather willing to "see" than to be indifferent. From now on, visions haunt her, and the secondary world powers are after her. She is nearly abducted into the mountain. From now on, she is also called Haugtussa (Fairy maid). She has also the ability to see what animal each person around her has behind him or her, not all of them good. The owner of the greater farm is followed by a dragon (symbolizing greed).

Veslemøy experiences the pangs of any young girl, she falls in love, and almost gets betrothed to the boy on the neighbouring farm. In the end, he marries a richer girl, and this nearly breaks her. Veslemøy has to fight even harder with her demons, and is once again taken into the mountains. Here, she meets the remaining Norse trolls, lamenting their fate and how light has taken the land from them. She is offered the hand of the Haugkall (mountain king). She resists, and is found witless and brought home sick. At the end of the book, her sister consoles her once again, telling her to be of good faith, and to prepare for a descent into Hel, guarded by a völva, who will teach her "through fear, the work which will become your honour".

== Sequel ==
The following book, I Helheim ("In Hel"), tells of Veslemøy's descent through the realms of the dead. Garborg tells a story similar to the divina commedia, using the text to criticize on morals and the church at the time. The poetic structure in this book is simpler, with one metre almost all the way. Veslemøy also learns about the blessed realms, and eventually wakes up wiser and more consoled than ever before. The epilogue tells how she later lives alone, ending as the "wise woman" in the community.

== Music ==
The poems of the main Haugtussa song cycle are catchy, and inspired to music from early on. Some of the poems are sung to folk tunes, and Edvard Grieg worked with 20 of the poems from 1895. Eight of these were selected for publication as a song cycle (Opus 67) in Copenhagen in 1898, and simultaneously a German and English version was published in Leipzig. Later, newer composers have made their own cycles on the text. The poems remain some of the best-known Nynorsk poems in Norway.

== List of poems ==
The poems as listed from the 1909 edition of Garborg's Skriftir i Samling (Collected Works), divided into subsections.

- "Til deg, du Hei og bleike Myr"

Heime

- "Veslemøy ved rokken"
- "Kvelding"
- "I Omnskråi"
- "Sporven"
- "Det syng"
- "Fyrivarsl"
- "Sundagsro"

Veslemøy synsk

- "Gamlemor ventar"
- "Veslemøy"
- "Syne"
- "Haugtussa"

Jol

- "Ungdom"
- "Lage"

I Gjætlebakken

- "Vindtrolli
- "D'er kje greidt"
- "Fuglar"
- "Under Jonsok"

I Slaatten

- "I Slaatten"
- "Veslemøy undrast"

Dømd

- "Dømd"

Dei vil ta henne

- "Maaneskinsmøyane"
- "Heilagbrót"
- "Kravsmannen"
- "I Skodda"
- "Veslemøy sjuk"
- "Snøstorm"
- "Draken"
- "Hjelpi"

Det vaarar

- "Mot Soleglad"
- "Vaardag"

Sumar i Fjelle

- "Paa Fjellveg"
- "Den snilde Guten"
- "Paa Gjætleberg-Nut"
- "Dokka"
- "Veslemøy lengtar"
- "Blaabær-Lid"
- "Møte"
- "Killingdans"
- "Elsk"
- "Skog-glad"
- "Eit Spursmaal"
- "Ku-Lokk"
- "Vond Dag"
- "Ved Gjætle-Bekken"

Paa Skare-Kula

- "Det vaknar"
- "Dei hyller sin Herre"
- "Prøve"
- "Svarte-Katekisma"
- "Stjernefall"
- "Ein Søkjar"
- "Høg Gjest"
- "Troll-Dans"
- "Bergtroll"
- "Gnavlehól"
- "Gumlemaal"

Den store Strid

- "Haust"
- "Raadlaus"
- "Den som fekk gløyme"
- "Kor hev det seg?"
- "Vinter-Storm"
- "I Kyrkja"
- "Ein Bêle"
- "Uro"
- "Bøn"
- "Paa Vildring"
- "Ho vaknar"
- "Ei svær Stund"
- "I Blaahaug"

Fri

- "Fri"
