= Harriet Bosse =

Swedish–Norwegian actress (1878–1961)

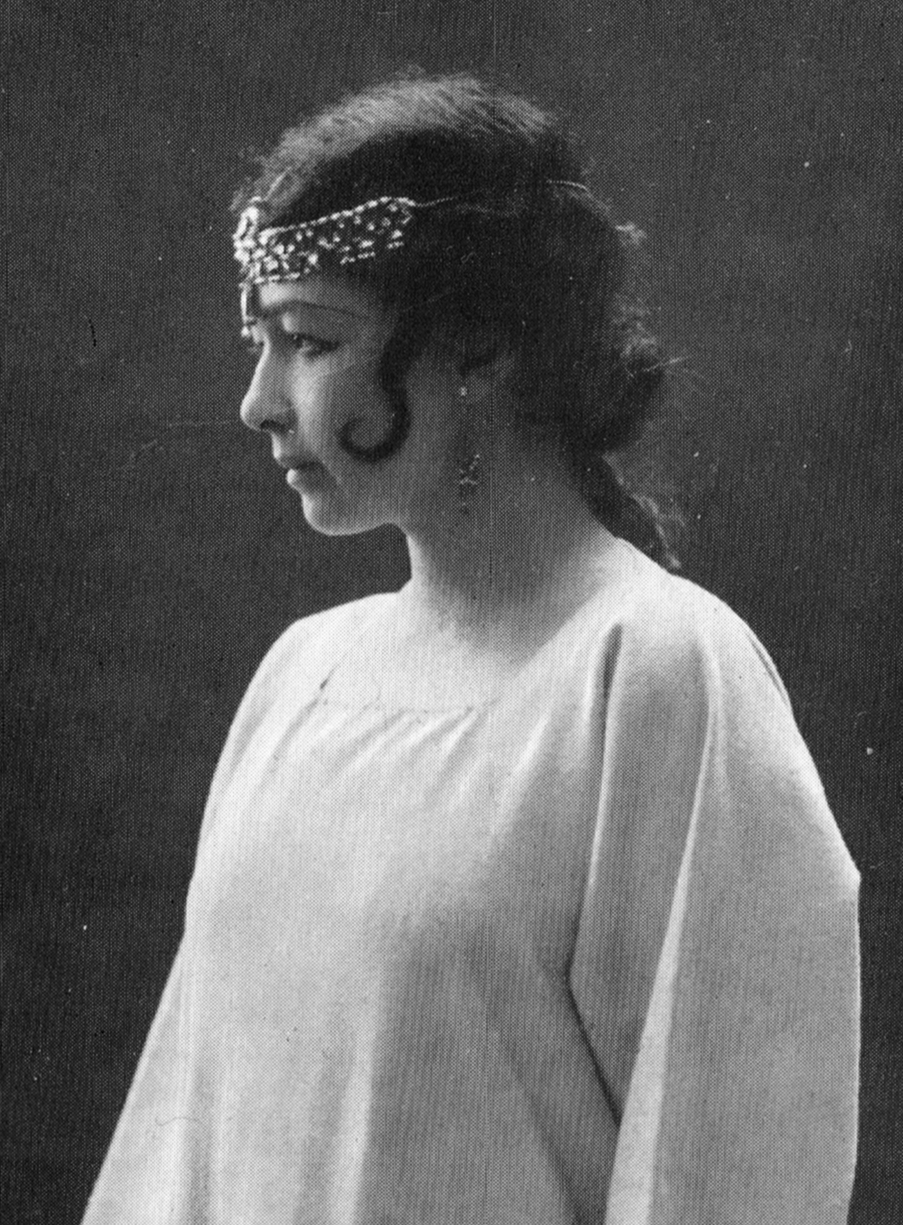
- Bosse as Indra's daughter at the 1907 première of A Dream Play
- Born: Harriet Sofie Bosse; 19 February 1878; Kristiania, United Kingdoms of Sweden and Norway
- Died: 2 November 1961 (aged 83); Oslo, Norway
- Occupation: Actress
- Spouses: August Strindberg (m. 1901; div. 1904); Gunnar Wingård (m. 1908; div. 1911); Edvin Adolphson (m. 1927; div. 1932)
- Children: 2
- Relatives: Alma Fahlstrøm (sister); Dagmar Möller (sister); Ewald Bosse (brother)

Harriet Sofie Bosse (19 February 1878 – 2 November 1961) was a Swedish–Norwegian actress. A celebrity in her day, Bosse is now most commonly remembered as the third wife of the playwright August Strindberg. Bosse began her career in a minor company run by her forceful older sister Alma Fahlstrøm in Kristiania (now Oslo, the capital of Norway). Having secured an engagement at the Royal Dramatic Theatre, the main drama venue of Sweden's capital Stockholm, Bosse caught the attention of Strindberg with her intelligent acting and exotic "oriental" appearance.

After a whirlwind courtship, which unfolds in detail in Strindberg's letters and diary, Strindberg and Bosse were married in 1901, when he was 52 and she 23. Strindberg wrote a number of major roles for Bosse during their short and stormy relationship, especially in 1900–01, a period of great creativity and productivity for him. Like his previous two marriages, the relationship failed as a result of Strindberg's jealousy, which some biographers have characterized as paranoid.

The spectrum of Strindberg's feelings about Bosse, ranging from worship to rage, is reflected in the roles he wrote for her to play, or as portraits of her. Despite her real-life role as muse to Strindberg, she remained an independent artist.

Bosse married Swedish actor Anders Gunnar Wingård in 1908, and Swedish screen actor, director, and matinee idol Edvin Adolphson in 1927. All three of her marriages ended in divorce after a few years, leaving her with a daughter by Strindberg and a son by Wingård. On retiring after a high-profile acting career based in Stockholm, she returned to her roots in Oslo.

== Early career ==
Bosse was born in Norway's capital Kristiania, today called Oslo, as the thirteenth of fourteen children of Anne-Marie (born Lehmann) and Johann Heinrich Bosse. Her German father was a publisher and bookseller, and his business led to the family's alternating residence in Kristiania and Stockholm, the capital of Sweden. Bosse was to experience some confusion of national identity throughout her life, and to take the 512 kilometres (318 mi) rail trip between the cities many times. A bold, independent child, she first made the journey alone when she was only six years old.

Two of Bosse's older sisters, Alma and Dagmar, were already successful performers when Harriet was a small child. Inspired by these role models, Harriet began her acting career in a Norwegian touring company run by her sister Alma and Alma's husband Johan Fahlstrøm (1867–1938). Invited to play Juliet in Romeo and Juliet, the eighteen-year-old Harriet reported in a letter to her sister Inez that she had been paralysed by stage-fright before the premiere, but had then taken delight in the performance, the curtain-calls, and the way people stared at her in the street the next day. Alma was Harriet's first and only—rather authoritarian—acting teacher. Their harmonious and sisterly teacher–pupil relationship became strained when Alma discovered that her husband Johan and Harriet were having an affair. Both Bosse parents were now dead, and Harriet, ordered by Alma to leave, used a modest legacy from her father to finance studies in Stockholm, Copenhagen, and Paris.

The Paris stage—at that time in dynamic conflict between traditional and experimental production styles—was inspirational for Bosse and convinced her that the low-key realistic acting style in which she was training herself was the right choice. Returning to Scandinavia, she was hesitant as to whether she should carve out a career in Stockholm, with its greater opportunities, or in Kristiania, to which she had closer emotional ties. In spite of the disadvantage of speaking Swedish with a Norwegian accent, Bosse let herself be persuaded by her opera-singer sister Dagmar to try her luck in Stockholm. She applied for a place at the Royal Dramatic Theatre, the main drama venue of Stockholm, governed by the conservative tastes of King Oscar II and his personal advisors. After working hard at elocution lessons to improve her Swedish, which was the Royal Dramatic Theatre's condition for employing her, Bosse was eventually to become famous on the Swedish stage for her beautiful speaking voice and precise articulation. Having trained her Swedish to a high level, she was engaged by the Royal Dramatic Theatre in 1899, where the sensation of the day was the innovative play Gustaf Vasa by August Strindberg.

== Marriage to August Strindberg ==
=== August Strindberg ===
Although Bosse was a successful professional, she is chiefly remembered as the third wife of Swedish dramatist August Strindberg. Strindberg had an important influence on the development of modern drama and became nationally known in the 1870s as a social reformist journalist and had risen to fame with his satire on the Swedish establishment, The Red Room (1879). In the 1890s, he had suffered a long and miserable psychotic interlude, known as the "Inferno Crisis", and, emerging from this ordeal, he remained marked by it. He turned from naturalism to symbolism in his prolific literary output, and his convictions and interests at the turn of the twentieth century focused less on politics and more on theosophy, mysticism, and the occult. When Bosse met him in 1899–1900, he was, at age 51, at the height of his creative powers, his name "red-hot" on the stage.

Strindberg had the reputation of a misogynist, something which all of his wives stoutly denied. Bosse wrote in an unpublished statement which she left to her daughter with Strindberg, Anne-Marie: "During the years I knew and was married to Strindberg I saw only a completely natural, kind, honorable, faithful man—a 'gentleman'". However, all of Strindberg's marriages were blighted by his jealousy and a sensitivity which has sometimes been considered paranoid and delusional.

=== Courtship ===
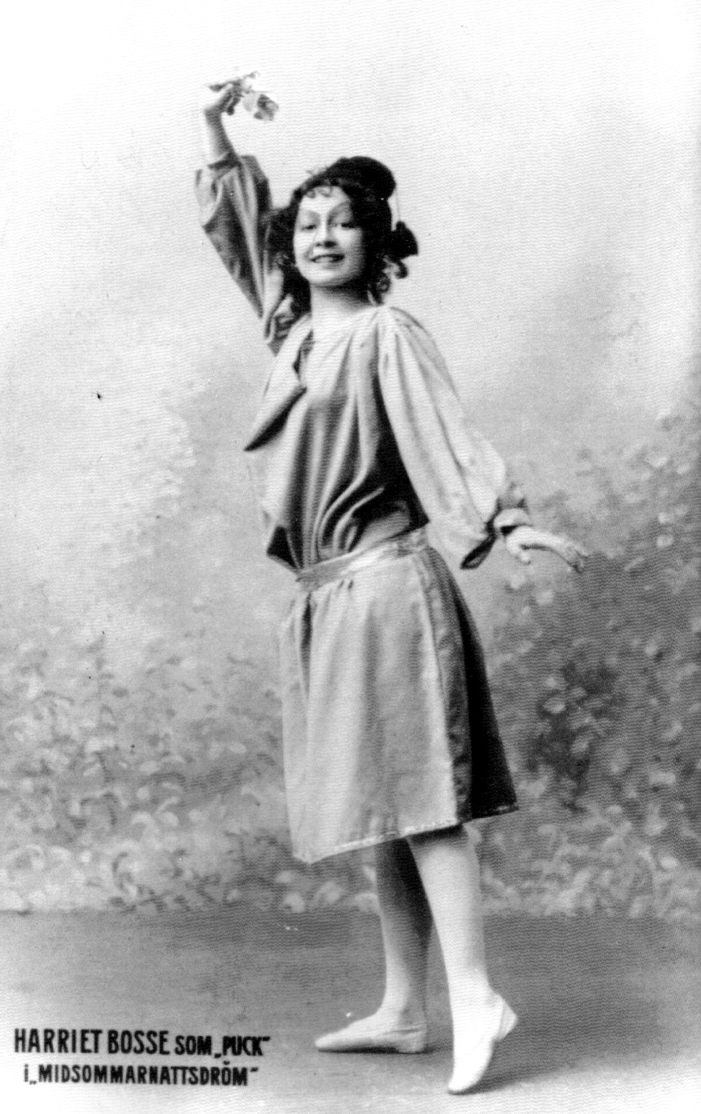
Bosse as Puck in A Midsummer Night's Dream. After the marriage was over, Strindberg kept a life-size copy of this photo mounted on a wall behind a drapery.

Bosse later published Strindberg's letters from their courtship and marriage. Incidents narrated in those letters and in Bosse's own interspersed comments have been analysed at length by biographers and psychiatrists, and have become part of the "Strindberg legend". Even before their first meeting, Bosse had been inspired by the newness and freshness of Strindberg's pioneering plays; an iconoclast and radical with two turbulent marriages already behind him presented an intriguing and irresistible mix to her.

Strindberg was susceptible to strong, independent career women, as well as to dainty, delicate-looking young girls; like his first and second wives—Siri von Essen and Frida Uhl—Bosse combined these qualities. He was entranced when he saw the dark, exotic-looking, petite twenty-two-year-old Bosse (who was often cast in sprite roles or what were conceptualized as "Oriental" roles) play her first major part, an impish Puck in A Midsummer Night's Dream. He immediately picked her out as a suitable actress for the part of The Lady in his coming play To Damascus, and invited her to his bachelor establishment to discuss the role. At this famous first meeting, Strindberg, according to Bosse's narrative of the event, met her at the door all smiles and charm. Offering her wine, flowers, and beautifully arranged fruit, he shared with her his fascination with alchemy, showing her a golden brown mixture he told her was gold he had made. When she got up to leave, Bosse claims Strindberg asked for the feather in her hat to use for writing his plays. Bosse gave it to him, and he used this feather, with a steel nib insert, to write all his dramas during their marriage. It is now in the Strindberg Museum in Stockholm.

Strindberg wooed Bosse by sending her books about theosophy and the occult, by attempting to mould her mind, and by furthering her career. Throwing himself into writing plays with central parts he considered suitable for her, he tried to persuade her to act them, and the Royal Dramatic Theatre management to cast her in them. Bosse asserts in her edition of the Letters that she tended to hang back, as did the management, being in agreement that she lacked the experience for major and complex roles. Strindberg, a power in the theatre, nevertheless often prevailed. The role of Eleonora in Easter (1901), which intimidated Bosse by its sensitivity and delicacy, but which she finally undertook to play, turned out to be Bosse's most successful and beloved role, and a turning-point in Bosse's and Strindberg's relationship. They became engaged in March 1901, during the rehearsals of Easter, in what in Bosse's narrative may be the best-known incident of the Strindberg legend. Bosse relates how she went to see Strindberg to ask him to give the part to a more experienced actress, but he assured her she would be perfect for it. "Then he placed his hands on my shoulders, looked at me long and ardently, and asked: 'Would you like to have a little child with me, Miss Bosse?' I made a curtsey and answered, as though hypnotized: 'Yes, thank you!'—and we were engaged."

=== Marriage and divorce ===
Bosse and Strindberg were married on 6 May 1901. Strindberg insisted that Bosse bring none of her possessions to the home he had furnished for her, creating a "setting in which to nurture and dominate her". In this setting, his taste in interior decoration was revealed to be Oscarian and old-fashioned, with pedestals, aspidistras, and dining-room furniture in hideous imitation of German renaissance, to Bosse's modern judgment.

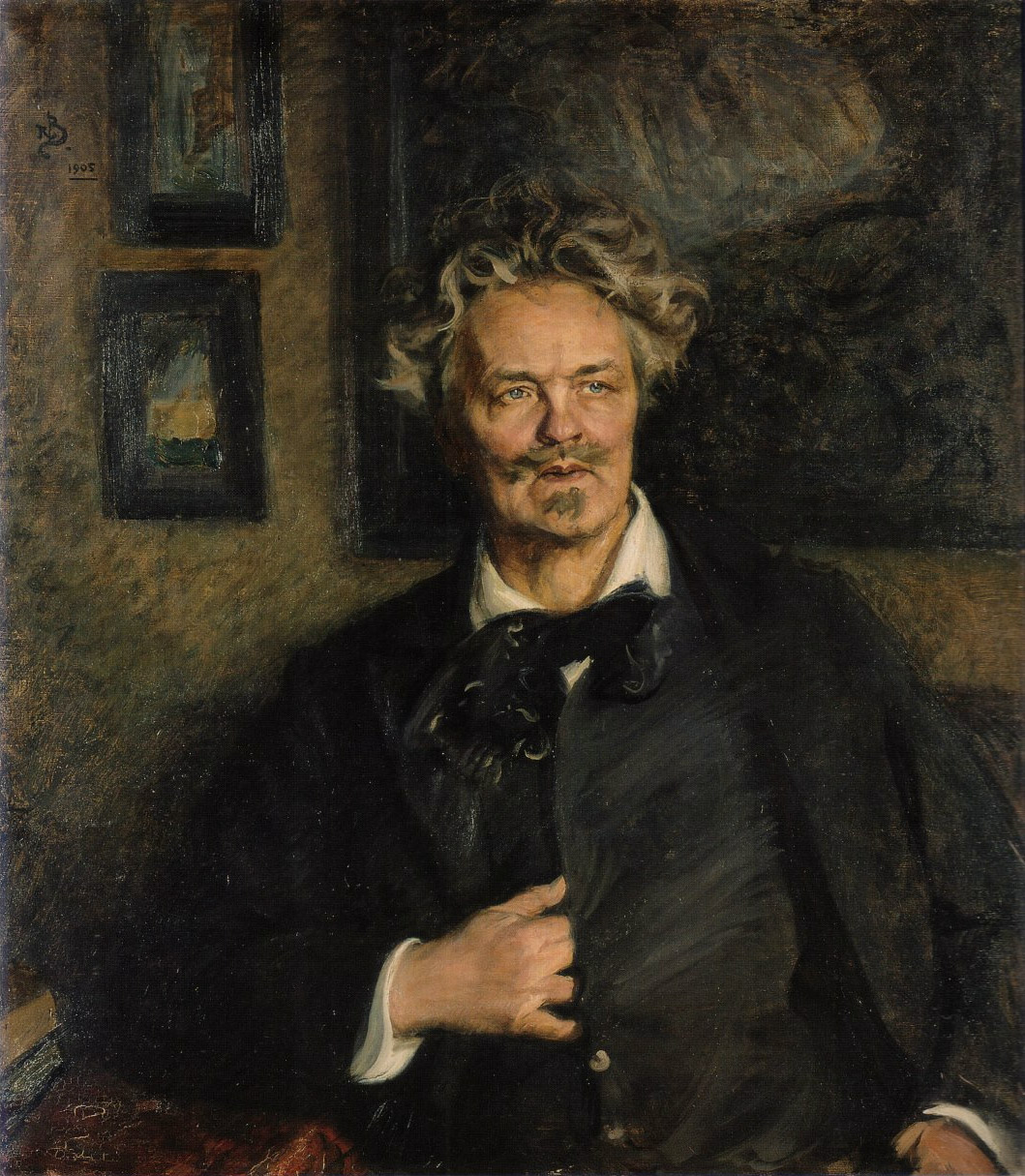
Portrait painting of Strindberg by Richard Bergh, 1905

Striving towards the life beyond, Strindberg explained, he could permit nothing in the apartment that would lead the thoughts towards the earthly and material. In her comments in the Letters, Bosse described with loyalty and affection Strindberg's protectiveness and his efforts to bring his young wife with him along his own spiritual paths; nevertheless, she chafed under these efforts, pointing out that she herself, at 22, was not even remotely finished with this world. Increasingly agoraphobic, Strindberg attempted to overcome his anxieties and allow his young wife the summer excursions she longed for. He planned sunny drives in hired victorias, but often the mystical "Powers" which governed him intervened. A crisis came as early as June 1901, when Strindberg arranged, and then at the last moment called off, a honeymoon trip to Germany and Switzerland. Bosse wrote in the Letters that she had nothing to do but stay at home and choke down the tears while Strindberg attempted consolation by giving her a Baedeker "to read a trip in".

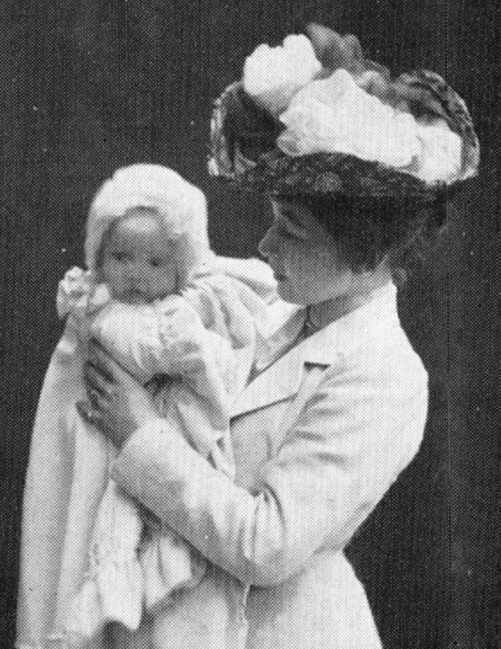
Bosse with Anne-Marie, aged six months

The cancelled journey was the beginning of the end. A crying, defiant Bosse went off by herself to the seaside resort Hornbæk in Denmark, a much shorter trip, but to her senses, a delightfully refreshing one. There, she was soon followed by Strindberg's letters, full of agonized remorse at having given her pain, and then by Strindberg himself, steeling himself to bear the social life Bosse relished. However, the relationship quickly foundered on jealousy and suspicion, as when Strindberg struck a photographer over the head with his stick, unable to endure any attention to Bosse. In August, when Bosse discovered that she was pregnant, even Strindberg's delight (he was a fond parent of the four children of his previous marriages) could not save a marriage full of distrust and accusation. This was illustrated in Strindberg's increasingly frantic letters to Bosse When their daughter Anne-Marie was born on 25 March 1902, they were already living apart. "For the sake of us both it is best that I do not return", wrote Bosse in a letter to Strindberg. "A continuation of life together with suspicion of every word, every act of mine, would be the end of me." At her insistence, Strindberg began divorce proceedings.

=== Strindberg's roles for Bosse ===
The relationship of Strindberg and Bosse was highly dramatic. Strindberg would lurch back and forth from adoration of Bosse as the regenerator of his creativity ("lovely, amiable, and kind") to a wild jealousy (calling her "a small, nasty woman", "evil", "stupid", "black", "arrogant", "venomous", and "whore"). His letters show that Bosse inspired several important characters in his plays, especially during the course of 1901, and that he manipulated her by promising to pull strings so that she could play them. During the brief, intense, creative 1901 period, the roles Strindberg wrote as artistic vehicles for Bosse, or that were based on their relationship, reflect this combination of adoration and "suspicion of every word, every act". Carla Waal counts eight minor and six major roles written for Bosse to act, or as portraits of her, several of them classics of Western theatre history. The major roles enumerated by Waal are The Lady in To Damascus (1900; mainly already written when Bosse and Strindberg met, but used between them to enhance their intimacy); Eleonora in Easter (1901; modelled on Strindberg's sister Elisabeth, but intended for Bosse to star in); Henriette in Crimes and Crimes (1901); Swan White in Swan White (1901); Christina in Queen Christina (1901); and Indra's daughter in A Dream Play (1902). The years refer to dates of publication; Bosse never played in Swan White, even though Strindberg kept proposing it, and though she was many years later to describe this play as Strindberg's wedding present to her.

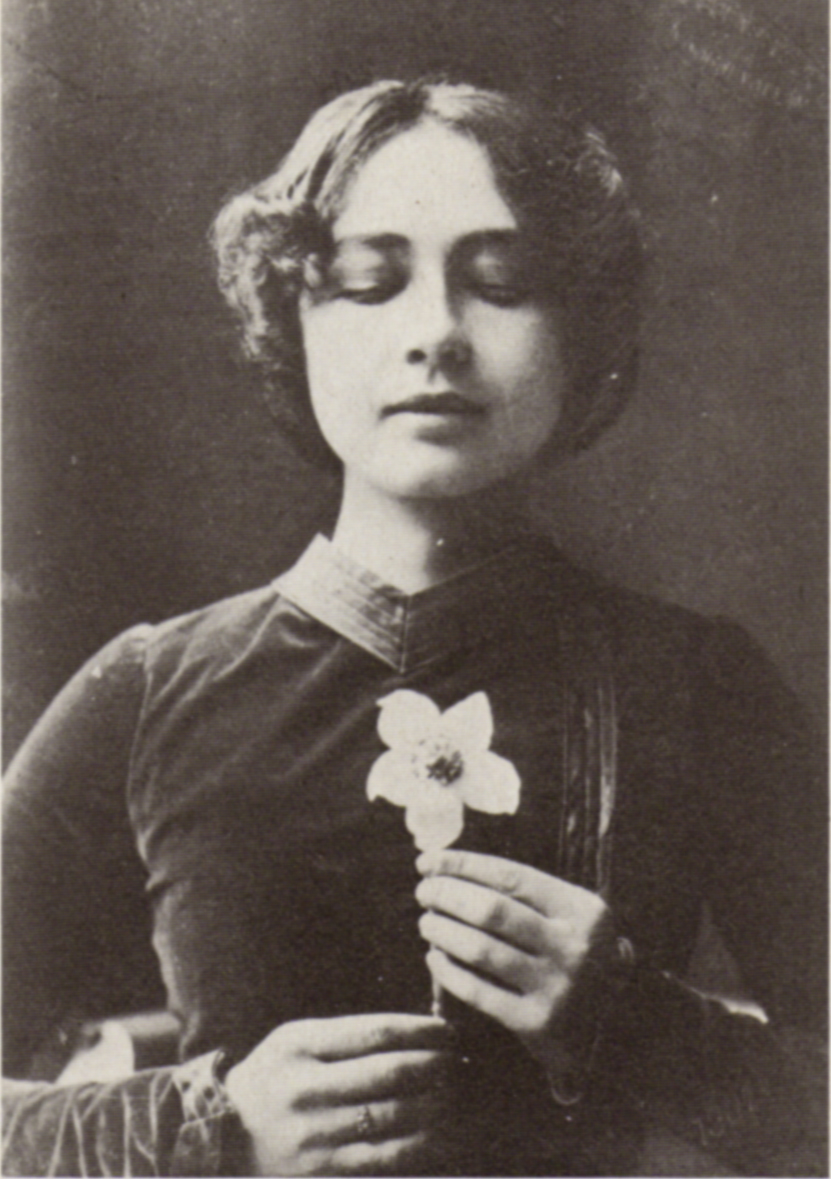
Bosse as the Lady in the première of To Damascus at the Royal Theatre in 1900

Strindberg claimed that Queen Christina was an "explanation" of Bosse's character as being that of an actress in real life, flirtatious and deceitful. In his influential Strindberg biography, Lagercrantz describes this play as a synopsis of the entire course of the Bosse–Strindberg marriage. He sees the courtiers as representing various stages of Strindberg's own emotions: Tott, in the first glow of love; de la Gardie, betrayed but loyal; Oxenstierna, who has rejected her. Each of the three men has words to speak which Strindberg himself had spoken to Bosse.

A Dream Play is positioned at the median of Strindberg's series of portrayals of his own marriage, the Bosse role imbued with both light and darkness. With its associative dream structure, this play is a milestone of modernist drama, described by Strindberg as a lawless reflection of The Dreamer's (Strindberg's) consciousness, limited only by his imagination which "spins and weaves new patterns… on an insignificant basis of reality". Agnes, played by and representing Bosse, is the daughter of the Vedic god Indra, descending to earth to observe human life and bring its disappointments to the attention of her divine father. The "Oriental" aspect of the play is based on Bosse's dark, exotic looks. Yet she is also drawn into mere humanity and into a claustrophobic marriage to The Lawyer, one of the versions of The Dreamer and, thereby, of Strindberg. Shut up indoors by a possessive husband, Agnes can not breathe; she despondently watches the servant working to exclude light and air from the house by pasting insulating strips of paper along the windows' edges. Recognizably, the "insignificant basis of reality" of Agnes' marriage to The Lawyer is the frustration of the newly married Bosse, yearning for fresh air, sunshine, and travel but fobbed off with a Baedeker.

== Independence ==
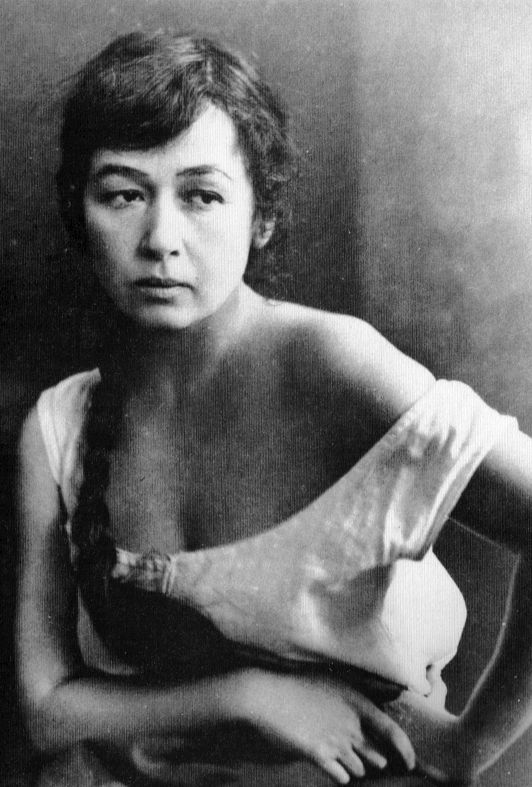
Bosse as Steinunn in Jóhann Sigurjónsson's The Wish, 1917

Both before and after the divorce from Strindberg, Bosse was a Stockholm celebrity in her own right. Her independence and self-supporting status gained her a reputation for being strong-willed and opinionated, insisting on, and receiving, high pay and significant roles. She left the Royal Dramatic Theatre with its conventional repertoire and began working at Albert Ranft's Swedish Theatre, where she and the skilful but more modest actor (Anders) Gunnar Wingård formed a popular co-star team. She travelled frequently, particularly for guest performances in Helsinki, leaving little Anne-Marie with Strindberg, a competent and affectionate father. In 1907, Bosse made theatrical history as Indra's daughter in Strindberg's epoch-making Dream Play. She and Strindberg met weekly for dinner at his house, and remained lovers until she severed connections in preparation for her marriage with Gunnar Wingård in 1908. In 1909 the Wingårds had a son, Bo. This marriage was also brief, ending in divorce in 1912. According to rumour, the cause of the divorce was Wingård's infidelity. However, Strindberg also heard gossip that Wingård's large debts threatened Bosse's finances.

In 1911, a divorced woman with two children to care for and support, Bosse returned to the Royal Dramatic Theatre. Strindberg was at that time fatally ill with cancer; he died on 14 May 1912. 1912 was altogether a year of death and disaster for the Bosse and Strindberg families: Alma Fahlstrøm's son Arne went down with the Titanic on 15 April; Strindberg's first wife Siri von Essen died later the same month; von Essen's and Strindberg's daughter Greta, a promising young actress, was killed in a train crash in June; and Bosse's divorced husband Gunnar Wingård shot himself on 7 October. Strindberg's funeral was a national event. Gunnar Wingård, a popular and charming actor, was also the subject of public grief. Throughout these shattering events, which left both her children fatherless, Bosse kept up her busy schedule, apart from a few days off, distraught and grief-stricken, after Wingård's suicide. For months after it, she received anonymous letters and threatening phone-calls, blaming her for Wingård's depression and death.

Bosse's third marriage, 1927–32, was to Edvin Adolphson, fifteen years her junior. Adolphson had abandoned his stage career in order to become instead a film director and one of the best-known Swedish film actors, a ruggedly handsome matinée idol whose screen persona Nils Beyer referred to as a combination of "apache, gangster and gigolo".

Bosse made two films, ambitiously shot and directed and based on novels by well-known writers. The artistic achievement of Sons of Ingmar (1919) has been highly praised. Directed by and co-starring Victor Sjöström, it was based on a novel by Swedish Nobel Prize winner Selma Lagerlöf; many years later, Ingmar Bergman referred to Sons of Ingmar as a "magnificent, remarkable film" and acknowledged his own debt to Sjöström. Bosse, who played the female lead Brita, called Sons of Ingmar "the only worthwhile Swedish film I was involved in." However, the film failed to give her career the kind of fresh start that the Swedish film industry had given Edvin Adolphson, and it was seventeen years before she made another film. This was Bombi Bitt and I (1936), her only talkie, based on Fritiof Nilsson Piraten's popular first novel with the same title and directed by Gösta Rodin. Bombi Bitt was a successful, though more lightweight, production with a smaller Bosse role ("Franskan").

== Retirement ==
After many years of ambitious and successful free-lance acting, Bosse found her options narrowing in the 1930s. The Great Depression brought her economic hardship, and, even though she looked younger than her age, most important women's roles were out of her age range. Her technique was still often praised, but also sometimes perceived as old-fashioned and mannered, in comparison with the more ensemble-oriented style of the times. Finding herself unneeded by any Swedish repertory theatre, she only managed to return as a member of the Royal Dramatic Theatre by means of skilful persuasion and pointed reminders of her long history there. A humble employee at a humble salary, she played only fifteen roles, all minor, during her last ten years at the Royal Dramatic Theatre, 1933–43.

Retiring from the stage during World War II, Bosse considered moving back to Norway's capital Oslo, the home of her childhood and youth. Both her children had settled there. The move was delayed for ten years, during which she travelled whenever possible, and when it took place in 1955, she perceived it to be a mistake. Her brother Ewald's death in 1956 left her the only survivor of the fourteen children of Anne-Marie and Johann Heinrich Bosse. "How I long desperately for Stockholm", she wrote to a friend in 1958. "My whole life is there." She became chronically melancholy, enduring failing health and bitter memories of the final phase of her career at the Royal Dramatic Theatre. She died on 2 November 1961 in Oslo.

Bosse always guarded her privacy, so much so that the memoir she wrote of her life with Strindberg was deemed to be too uninterestingly discreet to be publishable.
