= The Stronger =

1889 play written by August Strindberg

- Original language: Swedish
- Written by: August Strindberg
- Genre: Dramatic monologue

Premiere
- Date: 1889

The Stronger (Swedish: Den starkare) is an 1889 Swedish play by August Strindberg. The play consists of only one scene. The characters are two women of which only one speaks; an example of a dramatic monologue. The importance of the silent character in a situational plot is also described as a monodrama.

== Synopsis ==
Strindberg’s distinctive one-act play as proponent naturalism (theatre), embodies a theatrical style with psychological cause and effect. Moment to moment revelations reflect a power struggle between two characters of which only one speaks. The title; "The Stronger", suggests possible motivation and outcome.

== Characters ==
• Mme (or Mrs.) X.

• Mlle (or Miss) Y

• A Waitress (suggested but not needed in the playing)

== Plot ==
Two actresses, one married and one not, meet accidentally at a café. The audience witnesses many reactions and imply meaning through the verbal recitation of the married character combined with the silent reaction and physical activity of the unmarried character. The relationship between the two involves an unseen character; the husband. The play is semi-autobiographical.

== Productions and adaptations ==
The Stronger was first presented on a triple bill at the Dagmar Theatre, March 9, 1889 as part of Mr. Strindberg’s own company: The Scandinavian Experimental Theatre. The other two plays were Creditors (play) and Pariah. The characters: (Mrs. X) was portrayed by Strindberg’s first wife; Siri von Essen, with Nathalia Larsen (Miss Y).

The New York Broadway premiere was presented at the 48th Street Theatre on March 18, 1913 (1 performance).

The first Broadway Revival, was presented at the Frolic Theatre (New Amsterdam Theatre Roof) on May 6, 1927 with Norma Holzman (Mrs. X) and Margaret McCarty (Miss Y) (1 performance).

The play was presented on a double bill with Miss Julie, in a February/March 1956 production at the Phoenix Theatre with Ruth Ford (Mrs. X) and Viveca Lindfors (Miss Y). Both plays were adapted and directed by George Tabori.

An April/June 1977 production, on a double bill at the Newman/The Public Theater, New York Shakespeare Festival, in association with the Sanctuary Theater Workshop and the Hudson Guild Theater, presented the play with Creditors. It was directed by Rip Torn with Amy Wright (Mrs. X) and Geraldine Page (Miss Y). The translation was by Palaemona Morner and R. Spacek.

Cesear’s Forum, Cleveland’s minimalist theatre, presented the play on a double bill with Playing with Fire, at Kennedy’s Down Under, Playhouse Square. Translated by Michael Meyer and directed/adapted by Greg Cesear, the July/August 2002 production featured Sheila E. Maloney (Mrs. X) and Juliette Regnier (Miss Y).

The August Strindberg Repertory Theatre at the Gene Frankel Theatre presented the play on a double bill with Pariah in a November/December 2016 production. The Edwin Bjorkman translation was adapted and directed by Robert Greer with Chudney Sykes and Amber Crawford. The two actresses exchanged roles on a rotating nightly basis. The play was also produced in a translated/directed production by Mr. Greer in October/November 2012 on a double bill with Casper’s Fat Tuesday (the latter translated by Jonathan Howard and presented with Pink Pig Ballet) in association with Theater Resources Unlimited. (Mrs. X) Dina Rosenmeier (Miss Y, renamed Emil, a male counterpart) Albert Bendix.

The Jermyn Street Theatre, in association with Andy Jordan Productions and Elysium Theatre Company presented the play on a double bill with Storm. The production was also billed as Strindberg's Women, was translated by Michael Meyer, directed by Jake Murray with Sarah Griffiths (Mrs, X) and Alice Frankham (Miss Y) in a November 2016 run.

The Gamut Theatre Group in Harrisburg, Pennsylvania presented the play on a double bill with The Outcast under the title; 2 by Strindberg, in April 2022 productions. Abby Carroll and Erin Shellenberger alternated the roles nightly in alternating productions by directors Francesca Amendolia and Kim Greenawalt.

In 2023, the Mexican theatre company Arkhè Teatro presented a contemporary adaptation of the play titled ¿Quién es más fuerte? (Who's the Strongest?), created and directed by Mexican actor Augusto César Espinto. The production was performed several times across Mexico City and received positive reviews from specialized critic.

=== Music ===
The play was adapted into The Stronger (opera) in 1952 by composer Hugo Weisgall.

The play has also been expanded and adapted into a forty-minute English-language Spanish zarzuela (2010), with text by Christopher Webber and music by Derek Barnes.

=== Film ===
The play was first adapted for television in a production directed by Patrick Garland for the BBC in 1971. The film starred Marianne Faithfull as Madame X and was first broadcast on 1st May 1971. Principal cast: Marianne Faithfull and Britt Eckland.

The play, adapted and directed by Lee Grant for the 1974 American Film Institute (AFI) Directing Workshop for Women. The film was restored in 2022 by the Academy Film Archive and The Film Foundation. Principal cast: Susan Strasberg and Dolores Dorn.

The play was adapted by Frank McGuinness and directed by Lia Williams for Tightrope Pictures (2007) with Claire Higgins and Fiona O’Shaughnessy.

== Critical Response ==
Nasrullah Mambrol writes: Strindberg was; “a seminal figure in the first stage (1880-1920) of modern drama. Aside from the provocative autobiographical content of his work, Strindberg’s achievement rests on his perfection of the naturalistic form, his extension of that form into an imaginative forum for modern psychology, and his movement from dramatic realism to expressionism.”

Egil Törnqvist writes: “the respective strength of the two women in the play cannot easily be determined, because Strindberg could not make up his mind about the strength of the models for them. He saw some virtue, or at least some attraction, in each; hence the delicate balance between the characters representing these contrasting dispositions.”

Of The Public Theater production, Clive Barnes wrote: “ ‘The Stronger’ is a tour de force about the theatricality of silence. Ah! Miss Page is a model of silent reaction, and the chirpily pained wife is neatly played by Amy Wright. Mr. Torn directs here with resource.”

Kerrry Clawson wrote of the Cesear’s Forum work: “Maloney’s Mme X has an antagonizing yet somewhat desperate air, while Regnier beautifully shows Mlle Y’s cold contempt without speaking at all. With director Greg Cesear’s more modern interpretation of the play, no clear victor emerges.”
