= Harald Otto =

Norwegian actor and theater director

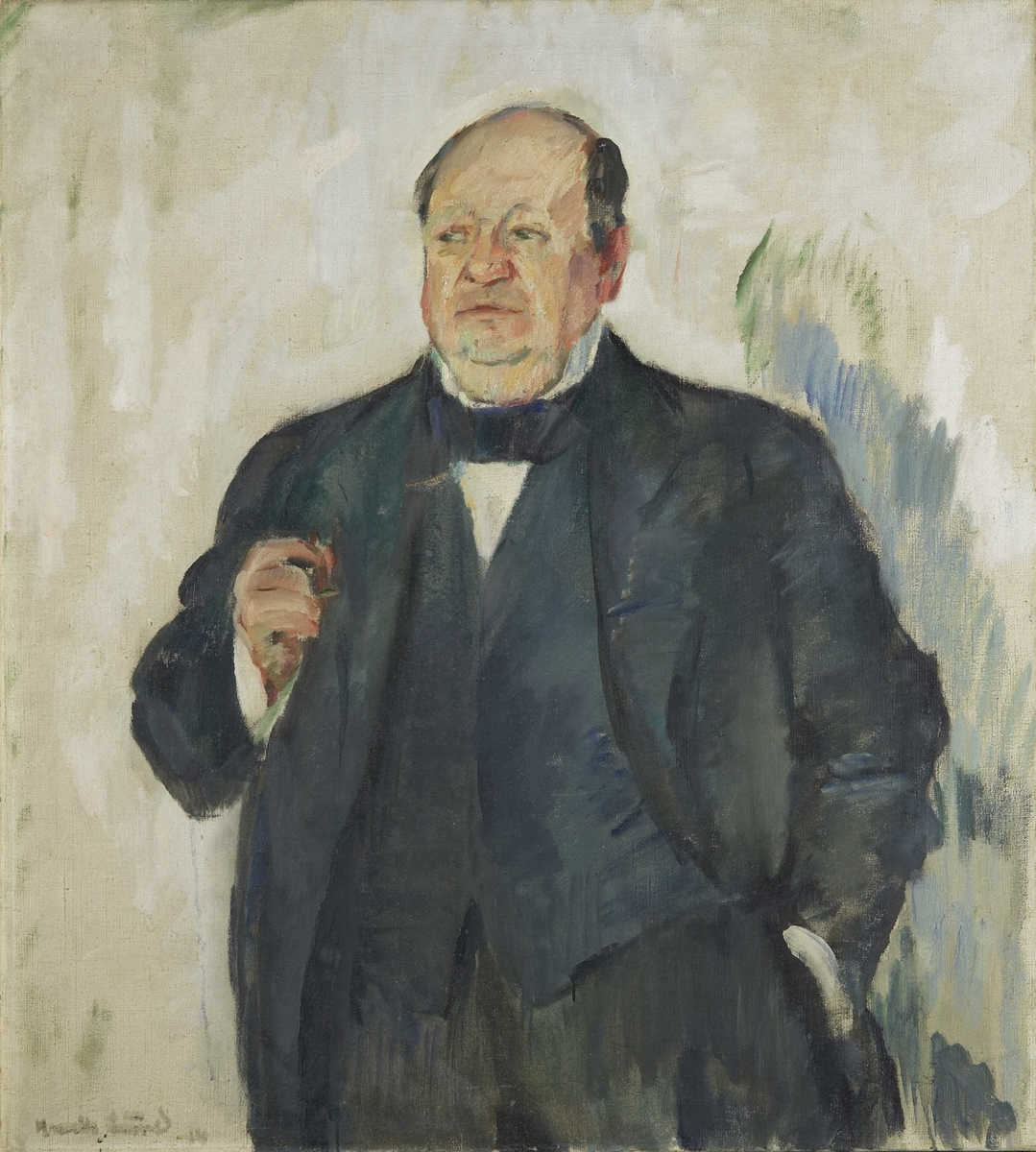
- Painting of Harald Otto by Henrik Lund, 1914
- Born: January 24, 1864; Nes, Norway
- Died: May 13, 1928 (aged 64); Oslo, Norway
- Occupation(s): Actor, theater director
- Spouse: Ignatzia Otto
- Children: Reidar Otto
- Parents: Hans Otto Hansen (father); Maren Paulsen (mother)

Harald Otto (January 24, 1865 – May 13, 1928) was a Norwegian actor and theater director.

Otto was born in Nes, Norway, the son of the stationmaster Hans Otto Hansen (1815–?) and Maren Paulsen (1832–?). He moved to the United States in 1886, and in 1890 he performed in the theater in Chicago, where he also married Ignatzia Johanna Osberg (1869–1945). He soon returned to Norway, where he worked in various theater groups from 1891 to 1900. He purchased the Central Theater in 1907 and he operated it until his death, with Torolf Voss serving as the theater's orchestra director. After Harald Otto's death, his son Reidar Otto took over the business. The theater remained in the Otto family until 1959.

Otto himself sang the song "Akerselva, du gamle, du grå" (The Old Gray Aker River) by Vilhelm Dybwad in 1906, when he staged Dybwad's play Verdens undergang (The End of the World).
