= Getting Married (collection) =

Collection of short stories by August Strindberg

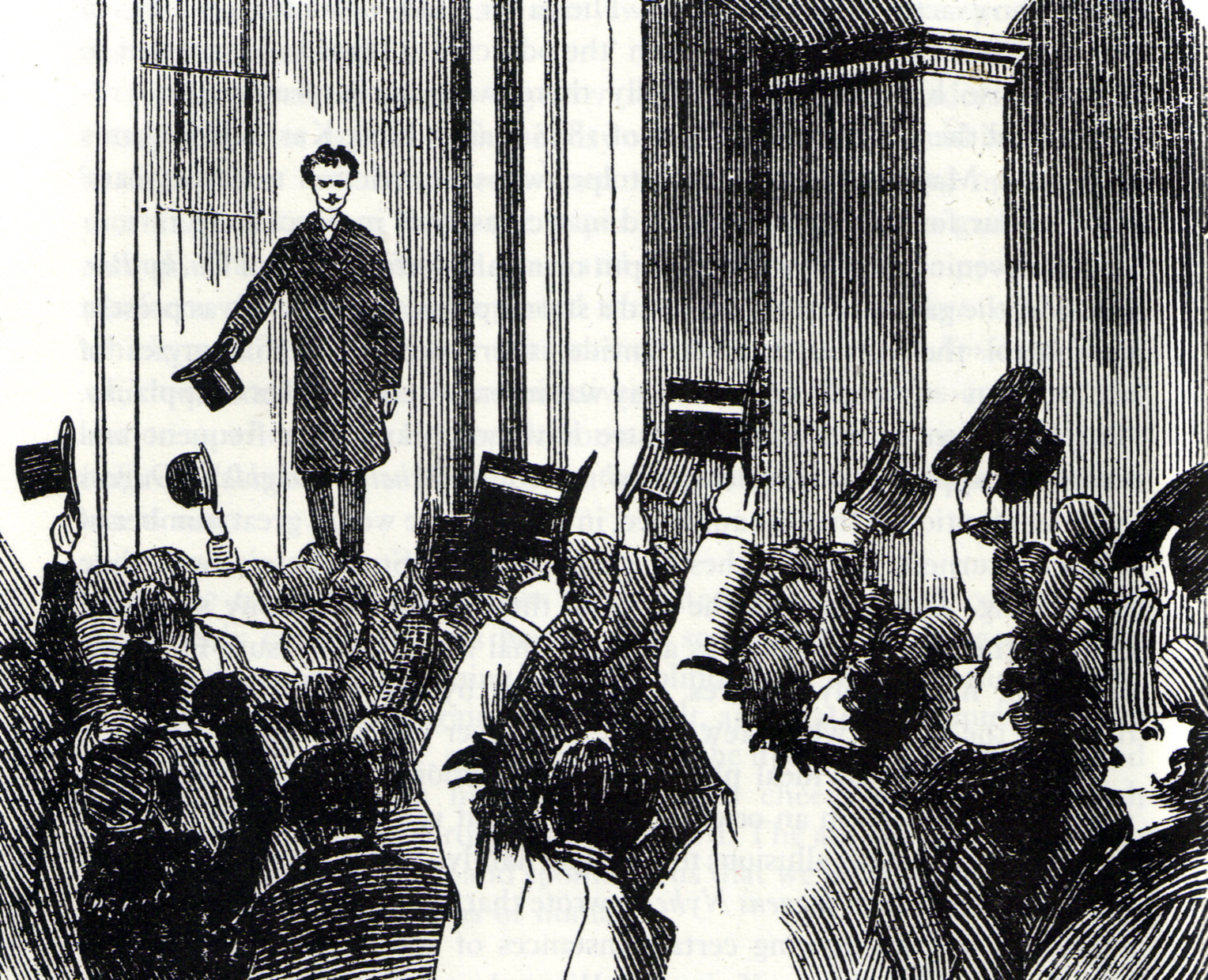
Newspaper illustration of Strindberg's reception on his return to Stockholm on 20 October 1884 to face charges of blasphemy arising from a story in the first volume of his collection Getting Married.

Getting Married (Swedish: Giftas) is a collection of short stories by the Swedish writer August Strindberg. The first volume was first published on 27 September 1884 and contained twelve stories depicting "twenty marriages of every variety," some of which present women in an egalitarian light. The volume also contained a long preface, in which, in addition to his support for women's rights, Strindberg offered criticisms of the campaign (such as its class bias), as well as of Henrik Ibsen's 1879 play A Doll's House (the collection contains a story entitled "A Doll's House"). Strindberg finished a second volume of stories, dealing in part with "all the less common forms of 'marriage'" such as "pederasty and lesbianism," in the summer of 1885. After a delay caused by the unwillingness of printers and distributors to handle such a controversial volume, it was published in October 1886. While the first two stories are as sympathetic to women as some of those in the first volume, many border on misogyny. Its preface blamed women for religious persecution, war, and all of history's other misfortunes. Both volumes were written at a time when Strindberg was still married to Siri von Essen, though the publication of the second volume had a disastrous effect on their marriage.

== Court case ==
One week after the publication of the first volume of Getting Married, Strindberg was prosecuted for "blasphemy against God or mockery of God's word or sacrament," the maximum penalty for which was two years penal labour. In "The Reward of Virtue" story, he criticised "the impudent deception practised with Högstedt's Piccadon ... and Lettström's wafers ... which the parson passed off as the body and blood of Jesus of Nazareth, the rabble-rouser who was executed over 1,800 years ago." Two groups "led by influential members of the upper classes, supported by the right-wing press" probably instigated the prosecution; at the time, most people in Stockholm thought that Queen Sophia was behind it. Strindberg returned to Sweden to face the charges, arriving on 20 October 1884 to a rapturous welcome. At a special performance of his Lucky Peter's Journey at the New Theatre that evening, he was crowned with a laurel wreath. He was acquitted of the charges on 17 November the same year.

== See also ==
- Sedlighetsdebatten

== Sources ==
- Lagercrantz, Olof. 1984. August Strindberg. Trans. Anselm Hollo. New York: Farrar Straus Giroux. ISBN 0-374-10685-1.
- Meyer, Michael. 1985. Strindberg: A Biography. Oxford Lives ser. Oxford: Oxford UP, 1987. ISBN 0-19-281995-X.
- Robinson, Michael, ed. 2009. The Cambridge Companion to August Strindberg. Cambridge Companions to Literature ser. Cambridge: Cambridge UP. ISBN 0-521-60852-X.
- Sandbach, Mary, trans. 1972. Getting Married Parts I and II. By August Strindberg. London: Victor Gollancz. ISBN 0-575-00629-3.
- Schleussner, Ellie, trans. 1917. Married. By August Strindberg. New York: Boni and Liveright. Available online.
