= Hrafnhildur Hagalín =

Icelandic playwright (born 1965)

Hrafnhildur Hagalín Guðmundsdóttir (born 1965) is an Icelandic playwright.

Born in Reykjavík, she studied classical guitar at the Reykjavík College of Music and literature and theatre at the Paris-Sorbonne University. Her first play Ég er Meistarinn ("I am the Maestro") was performed at the Reykjavík City Theatre; it was awarded the Icelandic Critics' Award and the Nordic Theatre Prize. In 2004, it was nominated Best Foreign Play in Italy. Her second play Hægan, Elektra ("Easy now, Electra") was performed at the National Theatre of Iceland in 2000. It was nominated for Best Icelandic Play in 2001. Hagalín lives in Reykjavík.

She has also written a radio play which was broadcast on the Icelandic State Broadcast Service and a television play.
