= Kristian Fahlstrøm =

Norwegian newspaper editor

Kristian Emil Fahlstrøm (27 January 1917 – 27 December 2005) was a Norwegian newspaper editor.

During the occupation of Norway by Nazi Germany he was an active resistance member; he was awarded the Defence Medal 1940 – 1945. He worked in Møre Dagblad from 1950 to 1953 and Adresseavisen from 1954 to 1959. He was then the editor-in-chief of Farsunds Avis from 1959 to 1983, except for the years 1964 to 1968, when he worked briefly as director of tourism in Kristiansand and as the editor-in-chief of Gjengangeren. He was also active in Rotary. He has published several books about local history.
