= Minha formação =

1900 book by Joaquim Nabuco

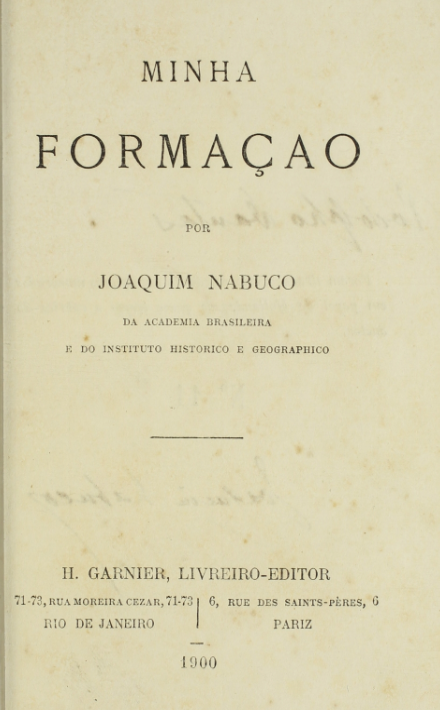
My Training by Joaquim Nabuco, 1st edition

Minha formação (My Formation or My Education) is the autobiography of Joaquim Nabuco, a Brazilian writer, diplomat and abolitionist. First published in 1900, it is often cited as a classic of Brazilian literature.

The autobiography includes an account of the slave-holding society in 19th-century Brazil and of the author's travels in Europe and America, as well as extensive digressions on philosophy, politics and abolitionism. It describes his encounters with Pope Leo XIII, George Sand and Ernest Renan.
