= Alma Fahlstrøm =

Norwegian stage actress, director and theatre manager

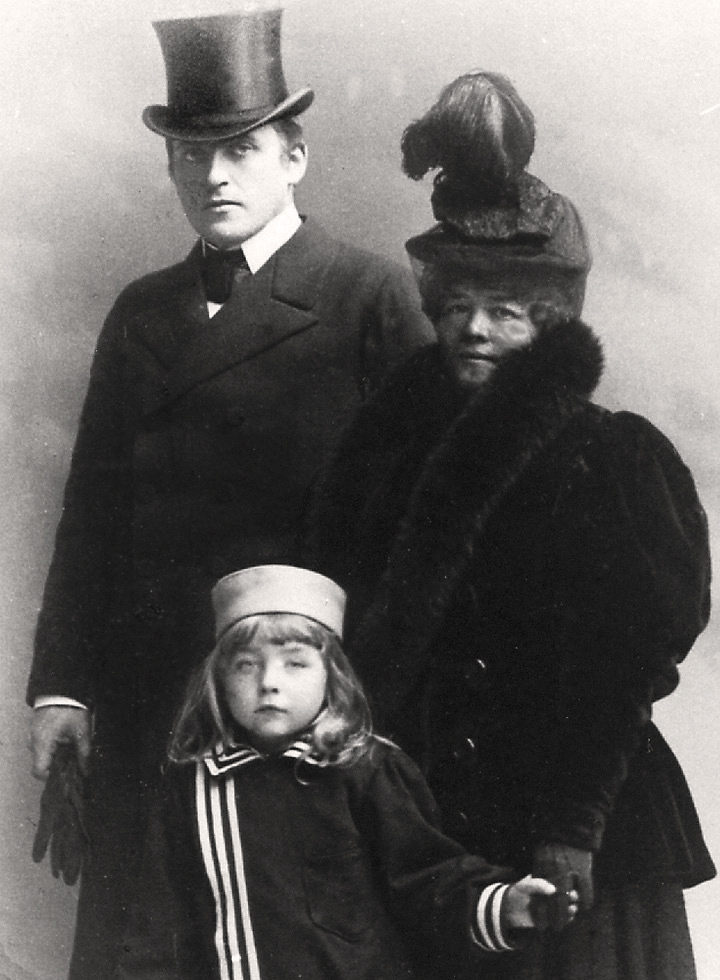
- Johan and Alma Fahlstrøm with their son, Arne.
- Born: Alma Isabella Bosse; 23 November 1863; Skanderborg, Denmark
- Died: 29 May 1946 (aged 82); Oslo, Norway
- Occupation(s): Actress, director, theatre manager
- Known for: Co-founder of the Oslo Centralteatret
- Spouse: Johan Fahlstrøm (m. 1889; died 1938)
- Children: 1
- Relatives: Harriet Bosse (sister); Dagmar Möller (sister); Ewald Bosse (brother)

Alma Isabella Fahlstrøm (née Bosse; 23 November 1863 – 29 May 1946) was a well known Norwegian stage actress, director and theatre manager.

Alma Isabella Bosse was born in Skanderborg, Denmark. She was the daughter of Johan Heinrich Bosse and Anne-Marie Lehmann. She was the sister of sociologist Ewald Bosse (1880–1956), singer Dagmar Möller and actress Harriet Bosse (1878–1961) who was married to playwright August Strindberg (1849–1912).

In 1889, she married fellow actor Johan Fahlstrøm (1867–1938). In 1897, she and her husband established the Centralteatret in Oslo. The theatre was especially known for a repertoire of light comedy, revues and operettas, as well as Norwegian drama. The couple subsequently operated the Fahlstrøm Theater on Torggata in Oslo from 1903 to 1911.

In 1912, the couple's only child, Arne Jonas Fahlstrøm (1893–1912) died in the Titanic disaster. To help avoiding further shipping disasters, they donated nearly all their fortune to the Norwegian Sea Rescue Society, which used it to purchase two rescue boats that were named in their son's honor.
