= Ewald Bosse =

Swedish-Norwegian sociologist and economist (1880–1956)

Ewald Theodor Alfred Bosse (4 April 1880 – 22 September 1956) was a Swedish-Norwegian sociologist and economist.

He was born in Stockholm as a son of bookseller and publisher Johan Heinrich Wilhelm Bosse (1836–1896) and Anne-Marie Lehmann (1834–1894). He was a brother of Alma Fahlstrøm and Harriet Bosse.

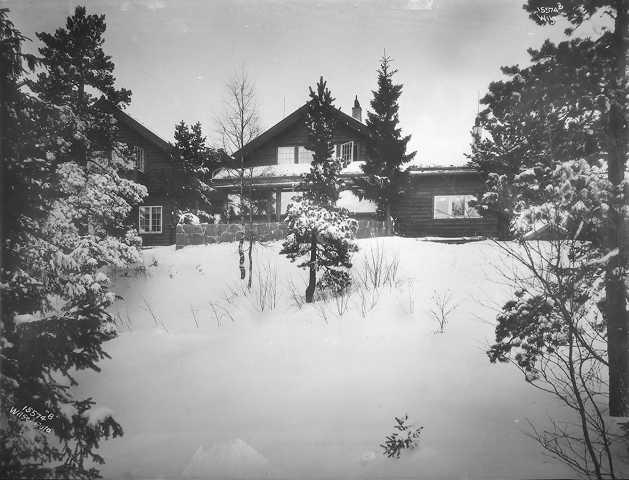
Bosse bought the villa "Solstuen" in Oslo in 1933.

He took the doctorate in Kiel in 1914 on the thesis Norwegens Stellung im internationalen Wirtschaftsleben vom 16. Jarhundert bis zur Gegenwart. He was a professor in Kiel from 1920 to 1926 and 1948 to his death. He died in September 1956 in Oslo.
