= Hugo Badalić =

Croatian writer

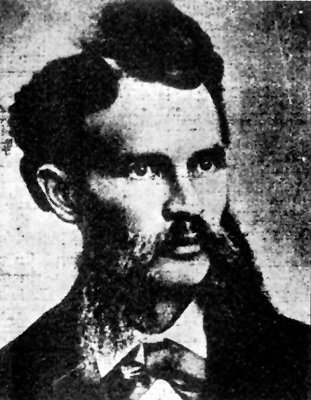
Hugo Badalić

Hugo Badalić (18 September 1851 – 4 May 1900) was a Croatian writer.

== Biography ==
Badalić attended primary school in his native city and Kostajnica, and the Classical Gymnasium in Zagreb. After finishing the gymnasium he went to university in Vienna where he graduated with a degree in Classical philology in 1874. The same year he was appointed as a teacher of the Grand Gymnasium in Zagreb. In 1879 he served as a professor at the Gymnasium in Rijeka, returning in 1882 to Zagreb where he worked at the gymnasium in Gornji Grad. From 1884, he served as the director of a female high school in Zagreb, and from 1896 as the first director of the newly established Grand Gymnasium in Zagreb's Donji Grad (today's building of the Classical Gymnasium). He published writings in Agramer Tagblatt, Napredak, Hrvatska vila, Velebit and many other periodicals. In 1884, he was elected to the committee of Matica hrvatska, where he edited a number of Matica's editions among which the collection of poetry Hrvatska antologija (Zagreb, 1892) can be singled out as the most notable. Badalić was the author of numerous literary discussions, recensions, pedagogic articles, and together with Ivan Broz, wrote the mandatory high-school handbook Poetika i stilistika za Hrvatsku čitanku za niže razrede srednje škole. He also published a collection of romantic songs: "Zlatno doba" (publisher Franz Bondy, Wien).

== Literary work ==
As a gymnasium student Badalić edited the periodical Ljiljan where he published his first poem in 1867 (Berba). He received literary recognition with the historic poem Panem et circenes (Vijenac, 1874). Badalić's poetry, published in his Izabrane pjesme ("Selected poems", 1896), quite popular at the time, and also set to music according to Illyrian customs (Hatze, Ja ne znam što je majka mi), is also represented in modern anthologies (Danica, 1973; Majka, 1973; Vječnotraž, 1975). His poetry encompasses various literary genres, including romantic (Bolna djevojka), odic (to Ljudevit Gaj), and elegies (U Jurjevcu), thematically mainly focussing to patriotic and occasional motifs.

Based on the drama Nikolas Graf von Zriny oder die Belagerung von Sigeth by German Romanticist Theodor Körner, which premièred the opening of the new theatre building at St. Mark's Square in 1834, Badalić wrote the libretto for the historical opera Nikola Šubić Zrinski by Ivan Zajc (published in Hrvatski dom, 1876). He was also a translator of theatrical pieces by Scribe and Deschamps, Shakespeare, Goethe, and other authors.
