= Centralteatret =

Theatre in Oslo, Norway

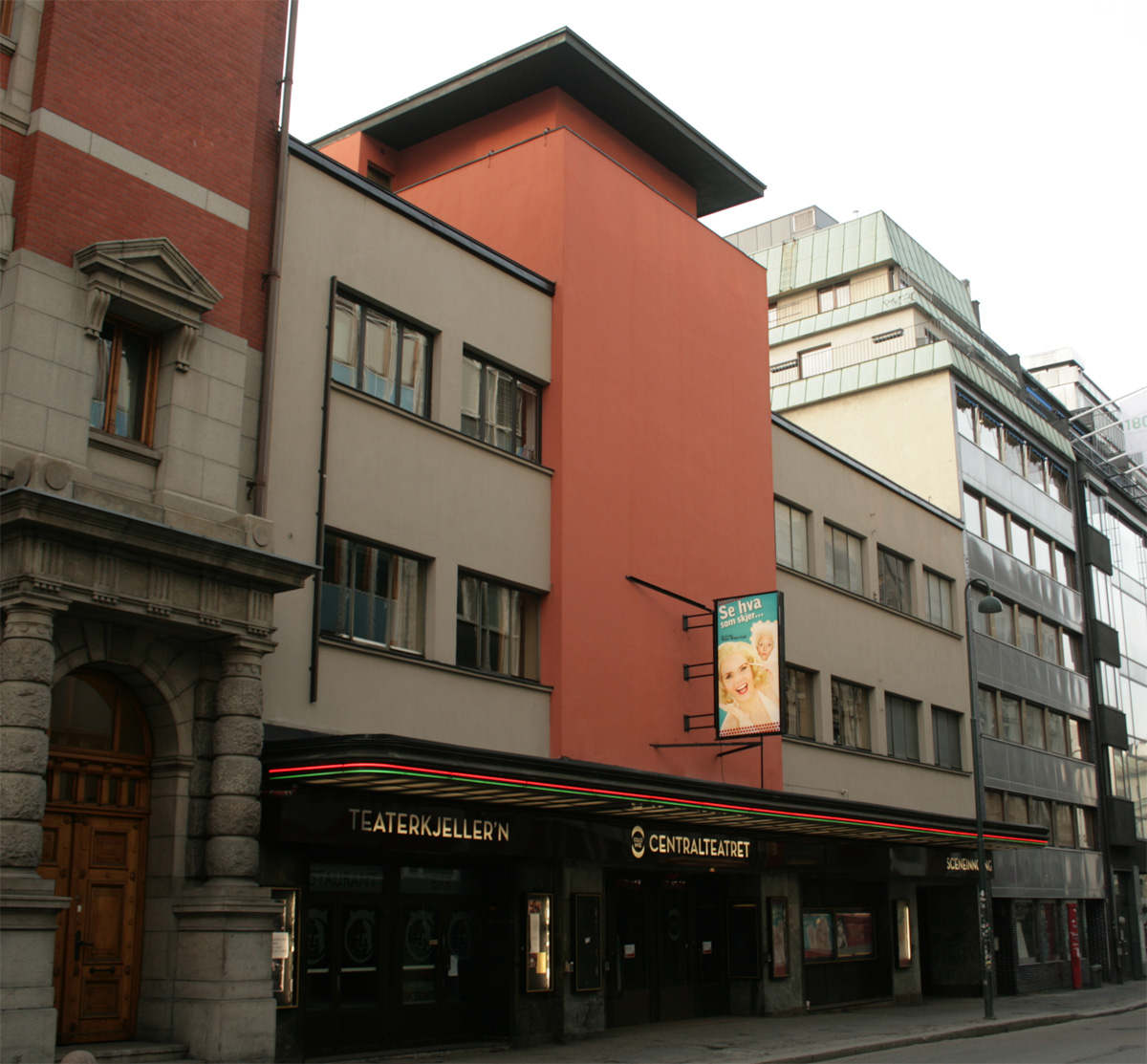
- Theatre entrance, 2009
- Interactive map of Centralteatret
- Full name: Oslo Nye Centralteatret
- Address: Akersgata 38; Oslo; Norway
- Coordinates: 59°54′52.5″N 10°44′36.2″E
- Operator: Oslo Nye Teater
- Type: Theatre

Construction
- Opened: 1897
- Years active: 1897–present

Website
- oslonye.no

Centralteatret (English: central theatre); (full name: Oslo Nye Centralteatret) is a theatre on Akersgata, in the city centre of Oslo, Norway.

Centralteatret was established by the husband-and-wife acting team of Johan Fahlstrøm and Alma Fahlstrøm, in 1897. The theatre was especially known for a repertoire of light genres, including comedy, revues, and operettas, but also classics and new Norwegian drama.

From 1902, Harald Otto (1865–1928) owned and managed the theatre. His son, Reidar Otto (1890–1959), subsequently ran it, while his son, Harald Otto, joined as manager in 1938. Members of the Otto family operated the venue until 1959.

As of 2026, Centralteatret is one of four stages that fall under Oslo Nye Teater.
