= Pariah (play) =

Pariah (Swedish: Paria) is a one-act play written by August Strindberg.

== Origins ==
Strindberg wrote Pariah along with his play Creditors in the town of Holte, Denmark during the winter of 1888–1889. He was in Denmark to create a theatre of his own, following the example he admired of the Théâtre Libre in Paris, which had been founded two years earlier. Strindberg's theatre would present naturalistic plays, and the artistic director would be his wife, Siri von Essen. It was to be called “The Scandinavian Experimental Theatre”, and then was renamed “Strindberg’s Experimental Theatre”. Beset with disasters, not the least of which was the censorship of his play, Miss Julie, the theatre had a tumultuous and extremely brief history. The theatre premiered in Holte on March 9, 1889, with a triple bill: Pariah, Creditors, and The Stronger. The evening was a success, with applause and curtain calls. Even harsh critics were won over, with the exception of a newspaper reviewer who demanded that Strindberg be deported. The performance was then repeated in the nearby Swedish town, Malmö.

In the audience at Malmö was Ola Hansson, who had just published a short story from which, Strindberg claimed in a program note, the title and theme of Pariah were taken. However, Hansson said he didn't recognize anything of his original theme. Hansson also reports that at this time he had lent Strindberg a book of mysteries by Edgar Allan Poe, and that Poe was a significant influence on Strindberg's writing at this time. A possible example of that influence, is that a scene of psychological detective work occurs in Poe's short story, "The Gold Bug", that appears to have inspired an episode in Pariah. Strindberg's original title for the play is “Paria”, with its Hindu etymology. Some English translations use the title, “The Outcast”, which, however, can be confused with an earlier play by Strindberg, “The Outlaw”.

Important to Strindberg with this and other plays, such as Miss Julie and The Father, was his desire to achieve the ideals of Naturalism in drama as described and analyzed by the French author and theorist, Emile Zola — the nouvelle formule. Strindberg modeled Pariah on the Les Quarts d’Heure (1888) plays of the French writers Gustave Guiches and Henri Lavedan, which, in his essay “On Modern Drama and Modern Theatre”, Strindberg describes as dramas reduced to a single scene.

Pariah carries on, in a veiled manner, a debate that Strindberg had been having through postal correspondence with the philosopher, Friedrich Nietzsche, who in Götzen-Dämmerung, portrays a criminal as a strong person, who is just misdirected in life. In Pariah the criminal, Mr. Y, is portrayed as weak and a criminal from birth. Strindberg in this play shows some influenced of his reading of the French translation of the l’uomo delinquente (1876) by Cesare Lombroso, an Italian criminologist, who promotes the idea that criminality can be discerned in a person's external self, as happens in the play, when Mr. X notices that Mr. Y is “terribly narrow between the ears.”

== Synopsis ==
The play involves a battle of brains between two men, “Mr. X and Mr. Y’’ in a Darwinian struggle for survival. The men are in a room in a farmhouse during a storm. A box of gold sits on the table, for which Mr. X is responsible. Both have committed crimes in their personal history. Mr. X, in his youth, murdered a man, but he was not caught, and he explains why it is right that he avoided punishment. As for Mr. Y, he forged a financial document, which secured a loan. For this he was caught and sent to prison, and he explains why it was unfair that he was punished. As both stories are shared during the play, it sets the men against one another. Which one is really the most guilty, and have either of them atoned for his sin? Mr. Y finally rationalizes that Mr. X. should pay Mr. Y a penalty or a bribe as a way of bringing "a little better balance into these unequal human conditions." Or it can be seen as Mr. X paying a bribe to keep Mr. Y quiet about Mr. X's crime. The atmosphere becomes tense and threatening, and the contest comes to a head when Y becomes armed with a knife, and X is armed with a stronger will, and can use his greater mental prowess to overpower Y.

== Characters ==
- Mr. X is a middle-age archeologist. He has been digging up and collecting treasures of antiquity.
- Mr. Y is a middle-age Swedish/American. He has arrived to collect insects for a small museum.
