= To Damascus =

Trilogy of plays by August Strindberg

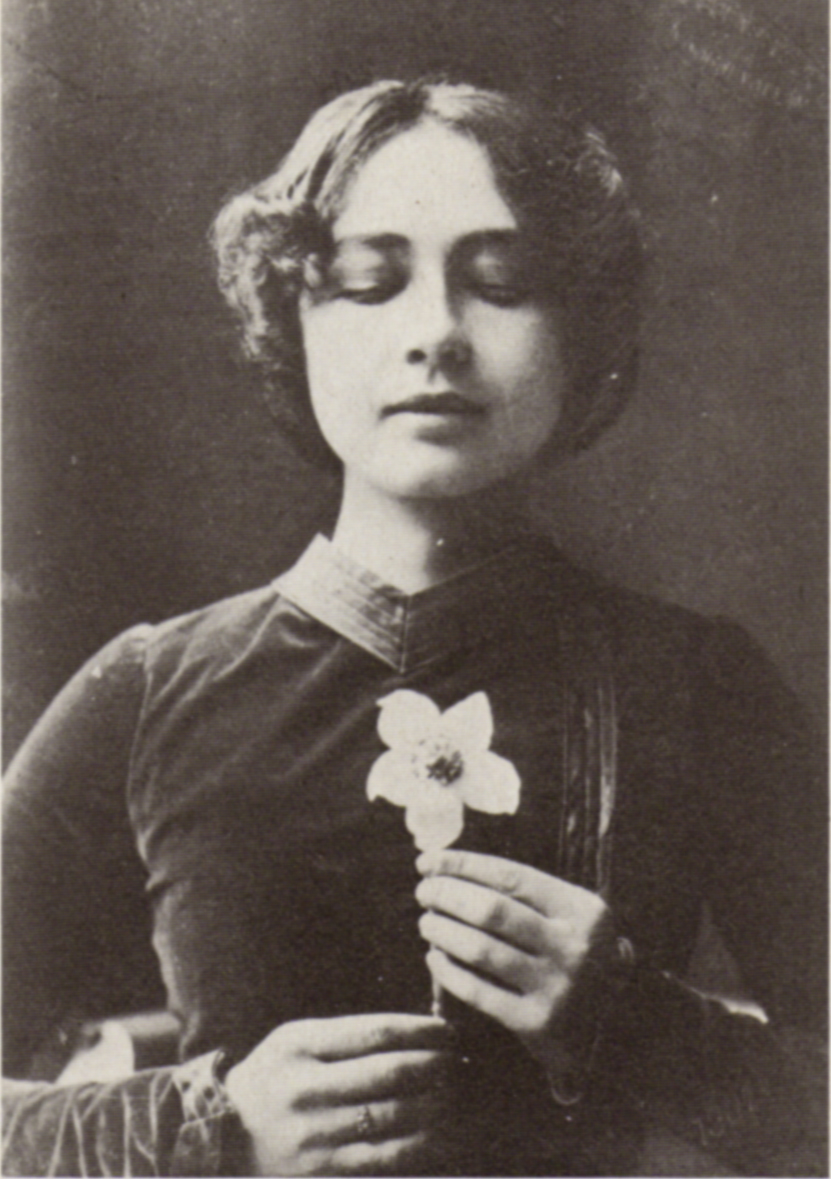
- Harriet Bosse as the Lady in the première production in 1900
- Original language: Swedish
- Written by: August Strindberg
- Genre: Station drama

Premiere
- Date: 19 November 1900
- Place: Royal Theatre, Stockholm

To Damascus (Swedish: Till Damaskus), also known as The Road to Damascus, is a trilogy of plays by the Swedish playwright August Strindberg. The first two parts were published in 1898, with the third following in 1904. It has been described as "Strindberg's most complex play" and as "his greatest play," due to its "synthesis of a wide variety of myths, symbols and ideas with a profound spiritual analysis in a new dramatic form."

== Writing process ==
Strindberg began writing Part 1 in January 1898 in France and by 8 March he had completed the manuscript. This marked the first time that Strindberg had written drama in five years. "If you find it good," he wrote to Gustaf af Geijerstam, "chuck it in at the theatre. If you find it impossible, hide it away." At this time, he considered the first part to be complete in itself; he did not originally intend to follow it with two sequels. He began writing Part 2 during the summer of 1898 in Lund and had completed it by the middle of July. The first two parts were published in a single volume in October 1898. Strindberg arranged for a copy to be sent to Henrik Ibsen, describing him as "the Master, from whom he learned much." Strindberg began to write Part 3 in January 1901. It was published in April 1904.

== Analysis and criticism ==
The dramatic structure of the first part utilises a circular, palindromic form of the Medieval "station drama". The protagonist, The Stranger, on his way to an asylum, passes through seven "stations"; having reached the asylum, he then returns to each in reverse order, before arriving at his starting-point on a street corner. Peter Szondi describes this form as a type of subjective theatre in which the classical "unity of action" is replaced with a "unity of the self":

In the "station drama," the hero, whose development is described, is separated in the clearest possible manner from the other figures he meets at the stations along his way. They appear only in terms of his encounters with them and only from his perspective. They are, thus, references to him.

This technique affects radically the way in which time operates in the drama, producing a static and episodic quality to the scenes. It belongs to what came to be known as "I-dramaturgy".

== Production history ==
To Damascus received its première at the Royal Dramatic Theatre in Stockholm on 19 November 1900, under the direction of Emil Grandinson. August Palme played the Stranger and Harriet Bosse played the Lady. The director hoped to utilise magic lanterns projected onto gauze as a means of tackling the many scene-changes that the play required, though he was forced to abandon the idea in the face of technical difficulties. The production ran for twenty performances.

August Falck directed a production of Part 1 at the Intimate Theatre in Stockholm, which opened on 18 November 1910. The theatre closed soon after under mounting debts. Another production was staged in Ystad in January 1912 as part of Strindberg's 63rd birthday celebrations.

Part 1 received its British première at the Westminster Theatre in London, in a production by the Stage Society that opened on 2 May 1937. It was directed by Carl H. Jaffé and starred Francis James and Wanda Rotha.

All three parts were performed at the Traverse Theatre in Edinburgh, in a production that opened on 3 April 1975. It was directed by Michael Ockrent and David Gothard and starred Roy Marsden and Katherine Schofield.

== Sources ==
- Meyer, Michael. 1985. Strindberg: A Biography. Oxford Lives ser. Oxford: Oxford UP, 1987. ISBN 0-19-281995-X.
- ---, trans. 1991a. To Damascus (Part 1). In Plays: Three. By August Strindberg. London: Methuen. 189-276. ISBN 0-413-64840-0.
- ---. 1991b. Introduction. In Plays: Three. By August Strindberg. London: Methuen. 179-188. ISBN 0-413-64840-0.
- Szondi, Peter. 1965. Theory of the Modern Drama: A Critical Edition. Ed. and trans. Michael Hays. Theory and History of Literature ser. vol. 29. Minneapolis: U of Minnesota P, 1987. ISBN 0-8166-1285-4.
- Ward, John. 1980. The Social and Religious Plays of Strindberg. London: Athlone. ISBN 0-485-11183-7.
- Williams, Raymond. 1952. Drama from Ibsen to Brecht. London: Hogarth, 1993. ISBN 0-7012-0793-0.
