= Easter (play) =

1901 religious drama

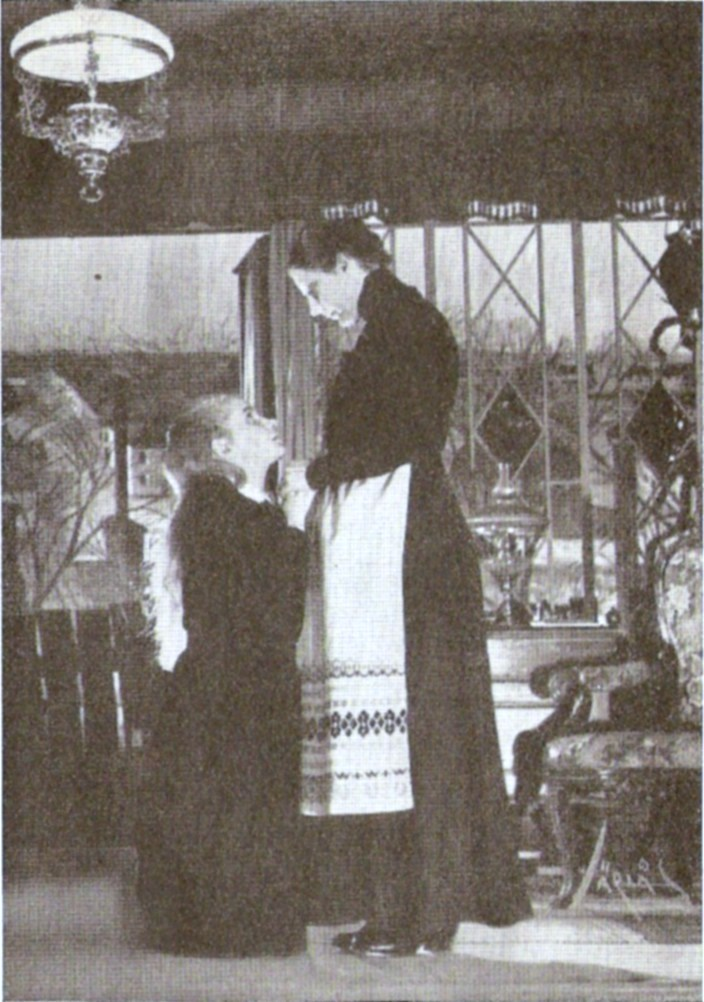
- Doris Svedlund as Eleonora and Dora Söderberg as Mother in a 1946 production
- Written by: August Strindberg
- Genre: Religious drama

Premiere
- Date premiered: 1901
- Place premiered: Intima Teatern

Easter (Swedish: Påsk) is a symbolic religious drama from 1901 by Swedish playwright August Strindberg.

The play was produced by the Stockholm ensemble Intima Teatern, which also toured other Scandinavian countries, including performances of Påsk in Kristiania. It was the first of Strindberg's plays that was staged in Bergen, premiering at Den Nationale Scene in September 1909.

A revival set in Harlem and performed with an African American cast was well received. That production closed on Easter Sunday, 2013.
