= Jolin =

Jolin may refer to:

== People ==
- Jolin Chien (born 1986), Taiwanese singer and actor
- Jolin Tsai (born 1980), Taiwanese singer-songwriter and actress
- Dominique Jolin (born 1964), French Canadian creator of the children's show Toopy and Binoo
- Einar Jolin (1890–1976), Swedish painter
- Ellen Jolin (1854–1939), Swedish writer and artist
- Johnny Jolin (born 1964), American country music artist
- Michele Jolin, American social entrepreneur and policymaker
- Simon Jolin-Barrette, Canadian lawyer and politician

== Other uses ==
- Jolin, Iran, also romanized as Jolleyn, a village in Razavi Khorasan Province

== See also ==
- Jolina, a 1999 album by Jolina Magdangal
