= GCY =

GCY can refer to:

- CHC Global Operations International, UK-based airline; see List of airline codes (C)
- &Gcy;, named character reference for Ge (Cyrillic)
- General Central Yup'ik, Yupik language of Alaska, U.S.
- Global Citizen Year, American nonprofit
- Greeneville–Greene County Municipal Airport, airport in Greeneville, Tennessee, U.S.
