= Office of Social Innovation and Civic Participation =

Office within the Obama presidency

Office overview
- Formed: December 14, 2009
- Headquarters: White House Office White House
- Annual budget: $50 million (FY 2010)
- Office executive: David Wilkinson, director
- Parent Office: United States Domestic Policy Council
- Key document: White House Council for Community Solutions Executive Order

The Office of Social Innovation and Civic Participation was an office new to the Obama Administration, created within the White House, to catalyze new and innovative ways of encouraging government to do business differently. Its first director was the economist Sonal Shah. The final director was David Wilkinson.

== History ==
In 2009, President Barack Obama created the White House Office of Social Innovation and Civic Participation (SICP) as part of his Domestic Policy Council within the Executive Office of the President, the office that coordinates White House domestic policy.

The idea for a White House Office for Social Entrepreneurship was first developed at the Center for American Progress by then-Senior Fellow and former Ashoka staffer Michele Jolin.

In the past, public monies have often been directed to social initiatives that are failing or that have only a limited impact. At the same time, non-profit organizations, even if readily able to obtain short-term startup financing, face difficulty securing capital to sustain and expand successful programs.

Building on ideas of past administrations, the Obama-Biden transition plans included the creation of an agency within the Corporation for National and Community Service dedicated to building the capacity and effectiveness of the nonprofit sector. The plans highlighted the potential of this sector – as of 2012, nonprofits generated $1.5 trillion within the US economy, employed 13.5 million Americans and contributed nearly 5.5% GDP, while struggling with a scarcity of resources, given the uncertainty of donations, and their lack of access to traditional incentives to growth enjoyed by for-profit businesses. (By statute, 501(c)(3) organizations are not eligible for Small Business Authority loans, nor can they obtain many commercial debt products designed for small and medium enterprises.) The transition plans also called for using federal seed money to leverage private sector funding, so as to improve local innovation, expand successful programs, and test the impact of new ideas.

Also significant as a background to the creation of the SCIP were the recent changes in the social sector, with the emergence of scalable, market-based models of social change as a driving force. Such models include social enterprises with earned income strategies; mission-driven businesses that focus on achieving a double-bottom line; impact investors that seek to earn a financial return while achieving social benefit; and multinational companies pursuing models of corporate responsibility. No administration had focused on these trends until the Obama Administration created the Office of Social Innovation to build a policy agenda in this realm.

== Definition ==
The term Social Innovation, as defined by Stanford Social Innovation Review (SSIR), refers to a methodology of solving societal problems through new mechanisms that harness human and financial capital, and often stand at the crossroads of non-profit, public, and private sectors. Specifically, SSIR frames social innovation as "a novel solution to a social problem that is more effective, efficient, sustainable, or just than existing solutions and for which the value created accrues primarily to society as a whole rather than private individuals".

Social innovation refers to invention and new problem solving methods not only in non-profits, but also more broadly in how social entrepreneurs seek to address human development challenges, how impact investors think about providing capital to organizations who maximize stakeholder value, and how mission-driven businesses and socially responsible corporations lever their comparative advantages to improve societal outcomes.

== Mission ==
The mission of the Office of Social Innovation and Civic Participation is to strengthen and support the social sector. This includes nonprofit organizations, foundations, and social entrepreneurs, non-governmental organizations, mission-driven business, and multinational developmental banks.

== Strategy ==
The White House Office of Social Innovation and Civic Participation seeks to facilitate social innovation by harnessing human capital and facilitating the flow of financial capital. Based on evidence that communities with higher degrees of civic health exhibit better economic resilience, lower jobless rates, and faster returns to the workforce, the administration believes that a strong social sector leads to better economic opportunity.

Tactically, the Office of Social Innovation seeks to unlock social innovation potential on two fronts: Unlocking human capital and unlocking financial capital.

== Policies and programs ==
=== Priorities within harnessing human capital ===
The Office of Social Innovation drives federal policy regarding national service and volunteering. This is based on research that indicates that communities with higher degrees of civic health have increased economic resilience and lower rates of unemployment. Such civic health can be measured by indicators such as the rates of volunteering, voting, and the density of per capita nonprofits that provide essential local services. It is consistent with scholarship that has shown that unemployed people who volunteer have a higher likelihood of finding work than those who do not volunteer.

The data also indicates that interest in volunteering has reached extraordinary levels with historic numbers of applications for public programs such as AmeriCorps and Peace Corps. The popularity of non-governmental service programs such as Code for America, DataKind, and Global Citizen Year also has grown in recent years. All seem to indicate that more Americans want to serve – and that such talent could be put to good use to contribute to national renewal and stronger communities.

==== National service ====
National service has been a part of the fabric of American society since the founding of the country. It encompasses various models of public service including military service, and civilian service, such as AmeriCorps. Typically it is characterized by dedicated service to a single year or multi-year commitment at a single nonprofit organization. Participants benefit from a stipend of some sort that is important due to the fact that national service can be a part-time or full-time commitment, but the nature of the commitment precludes the participant from other full-time work.

==== Serve America Act ====
In April 2009, President Barack Obama signed the Edward M. Kennedy Serve America Act reauthorizing and expanding national service programs. The law added the number of AmeriCorps positions from 75,000 to 250,000 and created four new service corps. It was the most significant piece of national service legislation since the 1993 The National and Community Service Trust Act signed into law by President Bill Clinton.

After laying out a plan for expanding AmeriCorps, the administration launched FEMA Corps, a new service corps that builds upon the long-standing partnership between NCCC and Federal Emergency Management Agency through the creation of 1600 new AmeriCorps positions focused on disaster preparedness and relief activities. Enabled by new federal funding, these incremental corps members will gain hands-on experience and new skills that will improve their own professional prospects for the rest of their lives while they are increasing national resilience. Since the announcement, FEMA Corps members have been on the ground, helping with the coordinated response to disasters such as Superstorm Sandy in New York and New Jersey and the 2013 Moore and El Reno tornado outbreaks in Oklahoma.

==== Presidential Memorandum on National Service ====
In July 2013, President Obama announced a Presidential Memorandum on expanding national service. The memorandum supports new partnerships between federal agencies and Corporation for National and Community Service (CNCS) to expand national service opportunities for Americans. The memorandum, which created a task force consisting of members of the cabinet, focused on expanding national service. Agencies are required to create a plan to utilize national service and volunteering. The task force is chaired by the CEO of CNCS and the director of the Domestic Policy Council.

=== Volunteering ===
==== Day of Service ====
In 1994, Congress designated Martin Luther King Jr. Day as a federal holiday as a national day of service, and in 2009 designated September 11 as a national day of service. Both designations are affiliated with President Obama's United We Serve campaign, a nationwide service call.

=== Community partnerships ===
==== White House Council on Community Solutions ====
In 2010, President Obama signed the executive order establishing White House Council for Community Solutions to engage cross sector leaders to identify initiatives that expanded civic participation, helped solve the nation's most serious problems and create new pathways for "Disconnected Youth", 16- to 24-year-olds who are out of school and work. First Lady Michelle Obama served as honorary chair of the Council. The Council was chaired on a daily basis by former Gates Foundation CEO Patty Stonesifer. Its membership included a cross-section of business, nonprofit and community leaders including rock musician Jon Bon Jovi, Starbucks executive Paula Boggs, and eBay CEO John Donahue.

The Council participated in a series of town hall meetings across the country and conducted considerable research to understand the issues facing this population. The Council delivered its Final Report and Recommendations to the president in June 2012. One of its recommendations was to reposition the conversation about "Disconnected Youth" to "Opportunity Youth" in order to more appropriately consider these young people as valuable assets who could contribute to economic growth and civic renewal. The Council also generated additional output, including the creation of toolkit for employers seeking to hire Opportunity Youth. It spawned other outcomes, including the launch of the Aspen Forum for Community Solutions headed up by former White House Domestic Policy Advisor Melody Barnes.

==== Summer Jobs + and Youth Jobs ====
The administration launched the Summer Jobs + initiative, which provided paid employment opportunities to low-income and disconnected youth and pathways to employment through resume writing workshops, mentorship programs and job shadow days. Through the initiative, over 300,000 employment opportunities were provided to youth in 2012, over 100,000 of which were paid.

In April 2013, the president launched the Youth Jobs + initiative. He challenged business, non-profits and government to work together to provide employment opportunities for low-income and disconnected youth that will also aim to reduce youth violence in local communities. In September, the White House hosted a convening that focused on youth employment, especially "opportunity youth", people between 18–24 years of age. The event recognized and honored employers and nonprofits for innovative work to develop the discipline and skills associated with the employment for the country's youth.

=== Priorities within harnessing financial capital ===
Based on the research, it is clear that the social sector lacks adequate capital to address the needs of Americans and maintain its role as a safety net and economic engine. To reverse this trend, the Office of Social Innovation has laid out a strategy to optimize the flow of scarce public dollars and to increase the flow of incremental private dollars. This dual track is enabled by a five-part framework:

- Better information
- New instruments
- Strong intermediaries
- Institutional capital
- Impact at scale

Harnessing better information, taking into account transparencies provided by technology, data and evidence can support what programs are working, and which are in need of iteration or reform. Better information can lead to evidence that a program is working, and can help the government better allocate grants to support successful programs. Consequently, the government can have a higher probability of "investing in what works," better optimize public spend, and serve as a more responsible fiduciary for taxpayers. New instruments can help government alloy public dollars with private dollars, leverage outside expertise for localization or diligence, and attract outside capital to address social problems. Through the use of strong intermediaries, public-private partnerships can tap local knowledge, and build a sustainable ecosystem that goes beyond government. Better information, new instruments and strong intermediaries that help build sustainable ecosystems to solve hard problems can attract and unlock institutional capital, and as a consequence, programs can achieve true impact at scale.

==== Information ====
===== Impact Data Initiative =====
The Office of Social Innovation created the Impact Data Initiative to create more transparency regarding information related to the social sector as a strategy to increase the flow of financial capital into the field. The Impact Data Initiative has been focused on opening federal databases as well as encouraging nonprofits to provide additional information. It has been supported by nonprofit organizations such as the Aspen Institute, Charity Navigator, Guidestar, and the Urban Institute.

The Impact Data Initiative has predicated on changes to the Form 990. This is an annual reporting return that certain federally tax-exempt organizations must file with the Internal Revenue Service. In 2008, the form was revised as a result of the passage of the Federal Pension Protection Act. All 501 (c) 3 private foundations regardless of income must file a Form 990. The form provides information on the organization's mission, programs and finances. The public is guaranteed access to this information, but the IRS has not published this information in a manner consistent with trends in open data: it not very accessible nor available in a machine-readable format.

President Obama has proposed to phase in a requirement that all nonprofit organizations file their annual tax returns electronically in order to facilitate improved access to this information in a manner consistent with the Open Government Initiative. In November 2013, Senate Finance Committee Chairman Max Baucus released a tax reform discussion draft with a proposal to mandate all tax-exempt organizations required to file a Form 990 electronically and requiring the IRS to make the information on the forms available to the public in a machine readable format as soon as practicable.

===== Evidence-based policy =====
As part of President Obama's management agenda, the Office of Social Innovation has helped to lead federal agencies to increasingly focus on the use of data and modeling to inform and improve what is called evidence-based policy.

Evidence-based policy is not new, but it is an important priority of the administration, as outlined explicitly in a Memorandum M-13-17 issued in July 2013 by the Office of Management and Budget (OMB), and signed by directors of the White House OMB, Domestic Policy Council (DPC), Office of Science and Technology Policy (OSTP), and Council of Economic Advisors (CEA). The memorandum provided guidance for fiscal year 2015 agency budget submissions and describes plans to prioritize budget requests that strengthen the use of evidence and innovation to inform and improve decision-making.

The memorandum gave explicit guidance in a number of key issues, such as:

- Harnessing data to improve agency results
- High-quality, low-cost evaluations for rapid, iterative experimentation
- Using innovative outcome-focused grant designs
- Strengthening agency capacity to use evidence

OMB, in partnership with DPC, CEA, and OSTP orchestrated workshops designed to help federal agencies interpret and apply the budget guidance, taking into account how to focus evaluation resources on the most important policy questions, how to use "administrative data sets" from multiple programs and agencies, how to conduct rigorous program evaluations and data analytics on a tight budget, how to use existing budgetary authority to turn traditional competitive grant programs into innovative, evidence-based programs, and how agencies could harness research findings from behavioral science to implement low-cost approaches to improving program efficacy.

While the administration's focus on evidence-based policy is notable, it is not entirely unique. In 2013, Elaine Kamarck at Brookings launched the Center for Effective Public Management, the World Bank Institute promotes what it calls, "Lean" in the Public Sector, building upon the concepts of "Lean Startup", and "Lean Analytics" from Silicon Valley, the other agencies such as USAID, Education, and Labor already have competitive grant programs such as Development Innovation Ventures that take into account staged or tiered venture capital style grant making, using evidence to support scale-up grants.

Programs that utilize better information to inform decision-making in grants that involve strong intermediaries and that enable greater scale and innovation by driving new private capital into the social sector are often labeled "Innovation Funds," a priority that enables human and financial capital. This work is highlighted in an April 2014 SSIR article.

==== Instruments ====
===== Social Innovation Fund =====
The Social Innovation Fund (SIF) founded in 2009 and administered by the Corporation for National and Community Service, is one of the flagship social innovation programs created by the Obama Administration.

The SIF is a public-private partnership designed by the Office of Social Innovation, that tests new approaches to major challenges, leverages private/philanthropic capital and other non federal funding to meet these needs, and grows evidence-based programs that demonstrate measurable outcomes. SIF's unique model leverages private and local resources by investing millions of dollars to experienced grant making "intermediaries" to identify programs and guide them towards greater impact and strong evidence of success. Grants from the SIF are awarded between $1 to $10 million per year for 5 years through a rigorous competitive process. Such intermediaries then must raise incremental funds 1:1 in order to amplify the power of the federal funds. These organizations – which include venture philanthropies, community development financial institutions (CDFIs), operating foundations, and social enterprises – then invest the aggregate capital into high-impact nonprofits that are delivering evidence-based results in one of three priority issue areas: economic opportunity, healthy futures, and youth development.

In its first three years, SIF has awarded $137 million to 20 intermediary grant-makers, which have selected 221 nonprofit sub-grantees working in 37 states and the District of Columbia. Some notable SIF investments include College Advising Corps, Chrysalis, Harlem Children's Zone, and YearUp. In 2014, the Federal Budget increased SIF, raising the program from $45 million to $70 million, which many interpreted as a strong validation of the administration's social innovation agenda. In 2017, the SIF awarded a grant worth $1.2 million to Friends of the Children, a nonprofit mentorship organization.

The SIF originally was headed up by former Bridgespan executive Paul Carttar. Its current director is Michael Smith, a former senior executive of the Case Foundation. During his tenure at Case, Smith was credited with helping lead A Billion+ Change and the Startup America Partnership.

===== Pay For Success =====
Pay for Success (PFS) is a signature strategy of social innovations. It was originally pioneered by the Ford Administration as "social impact bonds." PFS offers innovative ways for the government to build public-private partnerships can be bring capital to test promising practices and scale programs that work, significantly enhancing the return on taxpayer investments because government only pays for programs that achieve results. At the same time, PFS offers the prospect of attracting new investment capital to fund important social programs, thus potentially boosting the capital available to fund social programs while creating new return horizons for private investors.

The Office of Social Innovation prioritized PFS in 2011 by introducing PFS in the FY12 Budget and initiating a series of events designed to educate local, county and state lawmakers about the opportunity presented by PFS. Since then, the White House has hosted numerous workshops, panel discussions, and other events focused on PFS.

The administration also has prioritized grant programs to pilot the potential of PFS to tackle various challenges. The Department of Justice announced three awards in September 2012: an implementation award in Cuyahoga County, Ohio and a planning award in Lowell, Massachusetts under the Second Chance Act and an additional contract to develop a blueprint for governments to use Pay for Success to reduce recidivism.

The Department of Labor announced two awards totaling $24 million in September 2013: one to the New York Department of Labor in the amount of $12,000,000 and the other to the Massachusetts Executive Office of Labor and Workforce Development in the amount of $11,670,000. These grants will support programming that aims to increase employment and reduce recidivism among formerly incarcerated individuals.

One of the key proposals SICP made for FY 2014 was a new $300 million Pay for Success Incentive Fund at the Department of Treasury. The Fund is designed to help State and local governments implement Pay for Success programs with financial partners. It will provide credit enhancements for organizations that seek to introduce Pay for Success and offer direct grants to fund outcome payments for successful, money-saving services.

===== Program related investments =====
The regulations regarding Program Related Investments (PRIs) originally were drafted in 1972 as part of a broad effort on tax reform. These rules facilitate the ability of foundations to move beyond conventional grants and use other financial means to support nonprofits or businesses pursuing charitable purposes. However, PRIs have not been adopted widely by the nonprofit field because their complexity in part due to the outdated regulations created higher transactions costs for foundations who wanted to use them.

In 2012, the Treasury Department updated aspects of the regulations for the first time in 40 years since they were first drafted. By publishing a set of clarifying examples of how PRIs could be used, the Obama Administration tried to make it easier for foundations to see how they can adopt flexible approaches to the deployment of capital. The examples included scenarios including the use of credit enhancements, loan guarantees, lines of credit, even equity investments to achieve their philanthropic missions.

==== Impact investing ====
The Office of Social Innovation has been responsible for elevating impact investing inside the Federal government. It has defined impact investing as "the practice of channeling capital toward businesses that intentionally generate economic return and public benefit". Such businesses openly track and measure social, environmental, and governance (ESG) considerations alongside their financial returns.

The Office of Social Innovation has hosted large-scale meetings, including the White House Forum on Impact Economy executed in partnership with the Aspen Institute. It launched the National Impact Initiative, a new approach to coordinate federal policy on impact investing. This encompasses the work of multiple federal agencies focused on impact investing, including programs such as the SBIC Impact Fund launched by SBA; the Freshworks Fund created by the Treasury Department and US Department of Agriculture; the Accelerating Market Partnerships program of the US State Department; and the Global Development Innovation Ventures partnership managed by USAID.

The Office has coordinated the US Government's participation in the US's G8 Social Impact Investing Forum and the subsequent work of the Social Impact Investment Task Force chaired Ronald Cohen. The US representatives on the Task Force include Matt Bannick, CEO of the Omidyar Network and the Honorable Don Graves, Deputy Assistant Secretary of Treasury. The US Advisory Board to the Task Force includes a wide range of thought leaders and impact investors.

My Brother's Keeper

My Brother's Keeper is a program supported by the Office of Social Innovation and Civic Participation, and was created after the shooting of Trayvon Martin. President Obama, whose administration originated the Office of Social Innovation and Civic Participation, made it a top priority to focus on improving the life outcomes of black men and young boys. President Obama saw a gap in opportunity for young men of color and sought to close these gaps. Like other efforts by the office, My Brother’s Keeper aims to engage in cross-sector collaboration to achieve change as well as be able to maintain change. Primarily My Brother’s Keeper works at a more personal level with communities by discussing with leaders, members and other organizations within the community.

The efforts of the Office of Social Innovation and Civic Participation, and specifically the My Brother’s Keeper initiative, were carried on by the Obama Foundation after Barack Obama had served his two terms. Since transitioning to the Obama Foundation, the initiative has made efforts to reduce youth violence. Some of these efforts include strengthening mentorship programs within community as well as educating young men on their resources and tools. These efforts were aimed at 19 organizations across 10 different states and Puerto Rico to conquer the following challenges: poverty of Black, American Indian, and Hispanic children; discipline to encourage younger students to focus on their education; increase employment; and decrease crime.

The initiative uses six key milestones to gauge how, where and when their intervention will be most beneficial. Milestone 1 is entering school. This focuses on fostering an environment in schools and at home, that allows for young children to gain a positive foundational understanding that will carry as they advance in their educational journey. This milestone primarily aims to conquer the economic disparities that exist that often create difficulties of mobility as well as outside factors such as poverty that may impact a child’s ability to focus at school. Milestone 2 is evaluated at the end of third grade, with the hopes that they are reading at grade level. At this point in schooling, reading begins to become a more integrated part of the educational process and without this skill, some children may fall behind. These efforts are carried out at school, assuring that early educators are supported enough to facilitate children who may be behind. Efforts are also encouraged at home through family involvement in supporting child’s education. Milestone 3 is set as graduating from high school, understanding that this now means these children are able to advance on to their higher education or to enter the work force. Milestone 4 is them completing some type of post-secondary program, whether it be college or job training. This milestone is based on the understanding that 65% of jobs now require post-secondary education. Milestone 5 evaluates the ability of the youth to enter the workforce, hoping that anyone who wants a job is able to get one. This milestone aims to assure all youth have access to the proper training as well as the necessary resources to allow them the opportunity to work such as low cost child care and transportation. Milestone 6, the final milestone, evaluates the youths' involvement in violent crime as well as supporting those who have already been impacted by violent crime. This milestone aims to tackle the reality of the racial disproportionalities in the criminal justice system.

== Personnel ==
=== Staff ===
Special Assistant to the President and Director of SICP: Jonathan Greenblatt is Special Assistant to the President and Director of the Office of Social Innovation and Civic Participation. Greenblatt is a serial social entrepreneur who previously co-founded Ethos Water (sold to Starbucks); founded All for Good (acquired by Points of Light) served as CEO of GOOD Worldwide; taught at the Anderson School of Management at UCLA; and launched the Impact Economy Initiative at the Aspen Institute.

Policy Assistant: Noemie Levy is the Policy Assistant in the White House Office of Social Innovation and Civic Participation. She supports the Office's full portfolio of initiatives, including Pay for Success, national service, and innovation funds.

Senior Policy Advisor: Rafael López is a Senior Policy Advisor at the White House Office of Science and Technology Policy and the White House Office of Social Innovation and Civic Participation. His work focuses on identifying areas where the innovative application of technology-based options can improve collaboration between the Executive Office of the President and federal agencies to strengthen the relationship between the administration, nonprofit, philanthropic, and professional organizations to use advanced technologies in the development and implementation of domestic and social policies and programs.

Senior Policy Advisor: Dave Wilkinson serves as Senior Policy Advisor for Financial and Social Innovation. On assignment with the Council on Environmental Quality, he closely coordinates with the Office of Social Innovation and Civic Participation to work on a range of projects in the Office's portfolio. In this role, Mr. Wilkinson draws from an extensive background in community finance, capital markets and financial innovation.

Presidential Innovation Fellow: Scott Hartley focused on Evidence-based Policy, data driven decision making, and competitive grant programs, helping the Office of Social Innovation, OMB, and other agencies consider Silicon Valley methodologies such as "Lean Startup" philosophy to drive staged decision making, faster or more iterative feedback loops, and risk mitigation without stifling innovation. On leave from Mohr Davidow Ventures, and on assignment from USAID's Development Innovation Ventures, he managed agency workshops related to the President's Management Agenda.

=== Past staff ===
Sonal Shah: Founding director of the Office of Social Innovation. Shah is a fellow at the Case Foundation and a board member at Social Finance US.

Michele Jolin: Senior Policy Advisor. She is a managing partner of America Achieves and leads its Results for America initiative.

Carlos Monje: chief of staff to the Domestic Policy Council

Charles D. Anderson: Policy Assistant. Anderson is an adviser at the Council on Foreign Relations.

Howard W. Buffett, senior policy advisor. He is a faculty member Columbia University's School of International and Public Affairs, the executive director of the Howard G. Buffett Foundation and the co-author of 40 Chances.

Annie Donovan: Donovan was a Senior Policy Advisor working collaboratively with SICP and the Council on Environmental Quality. She formerly worked as the chief operating officer at NCB Capital Impact and now serves as the CEO of Coop Metrics.

Marta Urquilla: Senior Policy Advisor

== Other social innovation and civic participation offices ==
Although the Obama Administration pioneered the Office of Social Innovation, the model has been replicated by other governments in the US and around the world.

US cities:

- Boston: Office of New Urban Mechanics
- New York City: Mayor Bloomberg's Center for Economic Opportunity
- Philadelphia: Philadelphia Mayor Office of New Urban Mechanics

US states:

- Illinois: Illinois Task Force on Social Innovation, Entrepreneurship, and Enterprise

Countries:

- Canada: British Columbia – Ministry of Social Development and Social Innovation
- United Kingdom: Cabinet Office Social Investment and Finance Team - Centre for Social Impact Bonds
- Australia: Government of West Australia – Social Innovation Grants Program
