= Jonathan Greenblatt =

American entrepreneur and executive (born 1970)

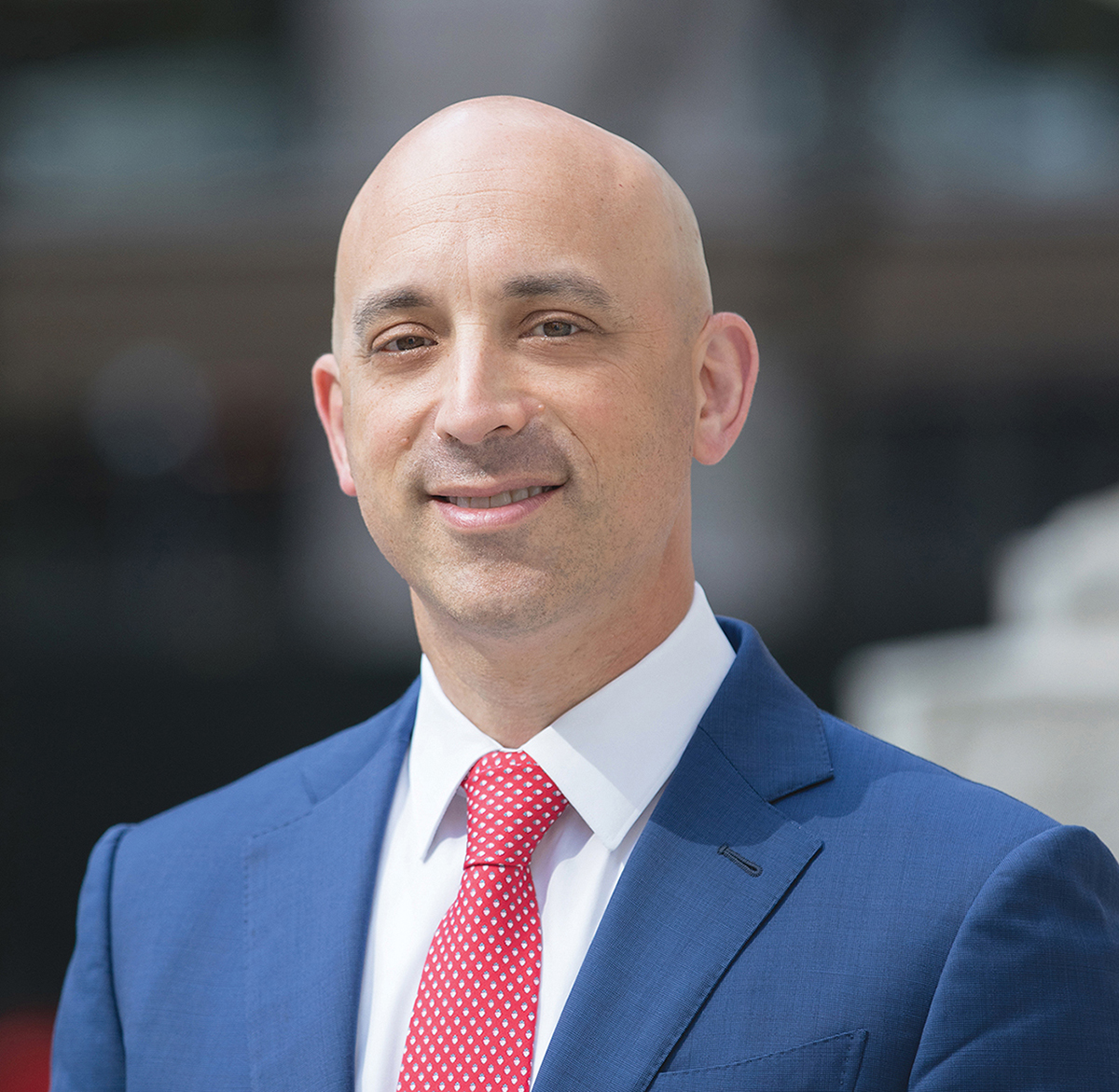
- Greenblatt in 2021

6th Director of the Anti-Defamation League
- Incumbent
- Assumed office July 20, 2015
- Preceded by: Abraham H. Foxman

Director of the White House Office of Social Innovation and Civic Participation
- In office 2011–2014
- President: Barack Obama
- Preceded by: Sonal Shah
- Succeeded by: David Wilkinson

Personal details
- Born: November 21, 1970 (age 55) Trumbull, Connecticut, U.S.
- Party: Democratic
- Spouse: Marjan Keypour
- Children: 3
- Education: Tufts University (BA); Northwestern University (MBA)

Jonathan Greenblatt (born November 21, 1970) is an American entrepreneur, corporate executive, and the sixth national director and CEO of the Anti-Defamation League (ADL). Prior to heading the ADL, Greenblatt served in the White House as Special Assistant to Barack Obama and Director of the Office of Social Innovation and Civic Participation. In 2025, Time magazine listed him as one of the world's 100 most influential people.

== Early life and education ==
Greenblatt was born on November 21, 1970, in Trumbull, Connecticut, to a Jewish family belonging to a Conservative synagogue. He graduated from Tufts University in 1992, earning a Bachelor of Arts. After college, Greenblatt worked on Bill Clinton's successful presidential campaign in 1992 in Little Rock, Arkansas. He went on to join the administration as an aide in the Clinton White House and later the United States Department of Commerce, where he developed international economic policy with a focus on emerging markets and post-conflict economies. Greenblatt also holds a master's in business administration from the Kellogg School of Management at Northwestern University.

== Career ==
=== Ethos Water ===
In 2002, Greenblatt and his business school roommate, Peter Thum, founded Ethos Water, a premium bottled water social enterprise. The company sought to help children around the world get access to free water by donating a portion of their profits to finance water programs in developing countries. In 2005, Starbucks acquired the company for $8 million. Following the acquisition, Greenblatt served as Starbucks Vice President of Global Consumer Products, scaling Ethos across the United States. Greenblatt also co-founded Ethos International, and served on the board of directors of the Starbucks Foundation, where he developed Ethos' global investment strategy that has invested millions of dollars to bring clean water to communities in need around the world, including Bangladesh, the Democratic Republic of Congo, Ethiopia, Honduras, India, and Kenya.

=== All for Good ===
Greenblatt also founded All for Good (AFG), the open source platform developed to enable more Americans to serve. AFG is the largest aggregation of volunteer opportunities on the Web, and is supported by a coalition of leading companies, non-profits, and government agencies, all of whom shared a vision of using open data to increase the number of Americans that participate in service and volunteerism. Craig Newmark, the founder of Craigslist, helped to sponsor the organization, and the open-source code was utilized by serve.gov. In 2011, AFG was acquired by the Points of Light Institute in a strategic partnership designed to help the organization scale.

=== Good Worldwide ===
Greenblatt was formerly the CEO of GOOD Worldwide, LLC. He led GOOD's transition from a publishing company to a diversified media company. Its products include the website GOOD.is and GOOD Magazine. As CEO, Greenblatt pushed a number of innovations at the company, including the launch of the GOOD Sheet, a broadsheet product distributed exclusively at Starbucks, and a name-your-own-pricing scheme that the company ran as an experiment. It is not clear whether this strategy was successful. Greenblatt said in 2008 that the broadsheets were intended to be ideologically neutral.

=== Impact Economy Initiative ===
Greenblatt founded the Impact Economy Initiative at the Aspen Institute to help policy makers create an enabling environment for the emerging market of social enterprise and impact investing. The Initiative worked with thought leaders across impact sectors, including co-convening the Impact Economy Summit at the White House in October 2011.

=== Other ventures ===
Greenblatt served as an operating partner at Satori Capital, a private equity firm focused on conscious capitalism, and was an active angel investor. He also served as a member of the faculty at the UCLA Anderson School of Management, where he developed and taught its coursework on social entrepreneurship. He also appears in the directory of Peter Thiel's Dialog organization.

=== Obama administration ===
In the fall of 2011, Greenblatt was appointed to serve as Special Assistant to the President for President Obama and Director of the Office of Social Innovation and Civic Participation (SICP) in the United States Domestic Policy Council. As Director, he led the Office's efforts to utilize human capital and financial capital to bring attention to community solutions. The Office focused on issues such as national service, civic engagement, impact investing, and social enterprise.

In his role as Director of SICP, Greenblatt took an active role in supporting AmeriCorps, supporting social entrepreneurs, and working with the G8 taskforce to support social impact investment. Greenblatt was involved in a number of administration priorities, including preventing gun violence and #GivingTuesday. Greenblatt left the administration in 2014 and was succeeded by David Wilkinson.

=== "Real Facebook Oversight Board" ===
On September 30, 2020, Greenblatt was named as one of the 25 members of the "Real Facebook Oversight Board", a group of academics, researchers and civil rights leaders created to counter the existing Facebook Oversight Board, an independent monitoring group over Facebook which they view as insufficient.

=== Anti-Defamation League ===
Greenblatt was named CEO of the Anti-Defamation League in 2014. Under his leadership, the organization placed less emphasis on civil liberties and more on advocacy for Israel and the interests of donors. Greenblatt's tenure has seen increased partnerships with law enforcement agencies and support for anti-BDS legislation such as the Israel Anti-Boycott Act. His support for the Department of Education's assistant secretary for civil rights Kenneth L. Marcus and president Trump's Executive Order on Combating Anti-Semitism drew criticism from employees of ADL's Civil Rights Division.

In a 2022 speech to ADL leaders, Greenblatt said that "anti-Zionism is antisemitism". The Times of Israel noted that the "speech marked a rare moment of the organization unequivocally" making that assertion. The remarks upset activists and Jewish groups critical of Israel, and also set off controversy within the ADL. Internal ADL messages seen by The Guardian included a senior manager at ADL's Center on Extremism writing in protest that: "There is no comparison between white supremacists and insurrectionists and those who espouse anti-Israel rhetoric, and to suggest otherwise is both intellectually dishonest and damaging to our reputation as experts in extremism." The newspaper reported that the speech, which "put opposition to Israel on a par with white supremacy as a source of antisemitism", had sparked controversy. The ADL told The Intercept that it did not consider the Gaza war protests antisemitic, but Greenblatt labelled the protesting groups as hate groups. Greenblatt accused groups including Jewish Voice for Peace and Students for Justice in Palestine of being "Iranian proxies" and compared the Palestinian keffiyeh to the swastika. These statements by Greenblatt were cited by editors of the online encyclopedia Wikipedia to support downgrading the ADL to a "generally unreliable" source on the topic of the Israeli–Palestinian conflict.

Following Elon Musk's announcement he was buying Twitter in 2022, Greenblatt praised Musk as an "amazing entrepreneur and extraordinary innovator" and "the Henry Ford of our time". Car manufacturer Henry Ford was one of the most prominent antisemites in the history of the United States. Greenblatt had previously criticized Donald Trump for praising Ford. Greenblatt apologized for the comparison, saying that "Admittedly, the Henry Ford reference was wrong even though he was an innovator in the automobile industry. I certainly was not trying to praise Ford and didn't intend to minimize his contemptible antisemitism in any way." In November 2023, Greenblatt again praised Musk, lauding his "leadership in fighting hate" after Musk said that X would suspend accounts which used the phrase "From the river to the sea, Palestine will be free." Greenblatt's praise of Musk came a day after Musk endorsed an antisemitic tweet which said "Jews push the exact kind of dialectical hatred against whites that they claim to want people to stop using against them." Musk had also supported "#BantheADL", a campaign driven by white nationalists. Greenblatt was criticized for his comments, including by employees of the ADL. Greenblatt later defended himself by noting he had criticized Musk's antisemitic post "right away", having called it "indisputably dangerous." Greenblatt said that "It's important that he made a good policy decision and announced that he was no longer going to tolerate language ... genocidal language that call to eradicate the state of Israel and annihilate the 7 million people who live there." Greenblatt further said "I'm not saying 'Oh, he's off the hook because he said this on Friday,' or 'Oh, he'll always be bad because he said this on Wednesday.'" When Musk gave a gesture resembling a Nazi salute in a speech following the second inauguration of Donald Trump, Greenblatt again defended Musk, saying "I think it was an awkward gesture. I don't think it was intended to be a fascist salute."

The Intercept reported in 2025 that Greenblatt has "shored up the ADL's role as little more than a fierce pro-Israel lobby group known for defending Israel by attacking its critics. With no sense of irony, much of this effort manifests as defamatory speech — at least in the everyday, if not the legal, sense — by Greenblatt." Greenblatt has expressed support for activist deportations in the second Trump presidency. In a June 2025 speech before Republican state attorneys general, Greenblatt said that the "real deal threat" to American Jews came from "this convergence of what I call the radical left and, like, Islamist groups here in the U.S.". Greenblatt compared pro-Palestinian student protesters to ISIS and al-Qaeda, and said regarding Mahmoud Khalil, "I am sure we're going to find out about his ties to groups overseas." In an appearance on Fox News, Greenblatt said that college graduates and social media influencers who criticized the Gaza genocide were responsible for the Boulder fire attack, and falsely accused graduating MIT class president Megha Vemuri, who had criticized MIT's ties to Israel, of spreading "blood libels".

In 2025, Yehuda Cohen, the father of a hostage held by Hamas in Gaza, criticized Greenblatt for falsely stating in a speech in France that his other son wanted to join the IDF and fight in the war in Gaza. Cohen said that his family supported a negotiated end to the war, and accused Greenblatt of promoting "cheap patriotism". Cohen said he had sought to meet with Greenblatt several times to explain his perspective, but had only met with Greenblatt's subordinates.

== Personal life ==
Greenblatt is the grandson of a Holocaust survivor. He is married to Marjan Keypour Greenblatt, an Iranian Jewish political refugee to the United States whose family fled Iran following the 1979 revolution. She is the founder and director of the Alliance for Rights of All Minorities (ARAM), a non-profit. They have three children.
