= Einar Nerman =

Swedish visual artist (1888–1983)

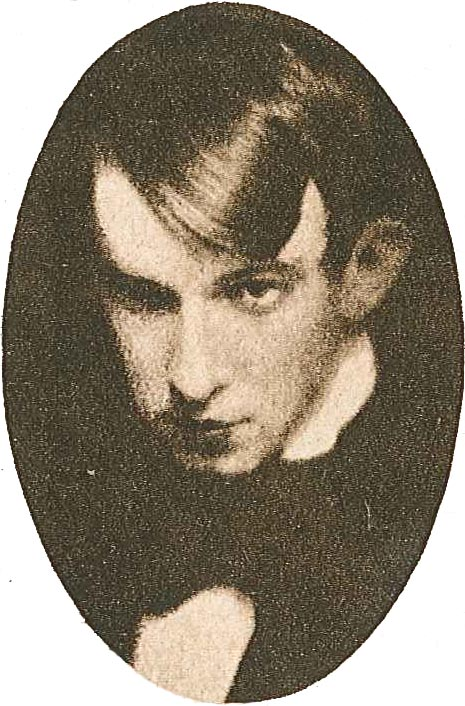
- Born: 6 October 1888; Norrköping, Sweden
- Died: 30 March 1983 (aged 94); Lidingö, Sweden
- Education: Konstnärsförbundets skola, Académie Matisse, Académie Colarossi
- Known for: Caricatures, paintings
- Relatives: Birger Nerman (twin brother); Ture Nerman (older brother)

Einar Nerman (6 October 1888 – 30 March 1983) was a Swedish visual artist known for his portraits, book and magazine illustrations and theatrical designs.

== Early life and education ==
He grew up in a middle-class family in Norrköping with his twin brother, archeologist Birger Nerman, and older brother, Swedish Communist leader Ture Nerman. (Note: The father of author and journalist Bengt Nerman) Their parents were Janne Emanuel Nerman and Ida Anna Adéle Nordberg.

In 1905 Nerman dropped out of Norrköping Gymnasium High School (Note: In 1906 he published "Gymnastics: Short tutorial for gymnastic exercises. The book of sports" Björck & Börjesson, Stockholm) and enrolled into the Konstnärsförbundets skola in Stockholm. In 1908 he went to Paris to study with Henri Matisse (Note: The best Matisse ever said of Nerman's creations was "pas mal".) at the Académie Matisse and at the Académie Colarossi. In 1910 he published Artists (Note: Editors Aktiebolaget Ljus) which contained cartoons and caricatures. In 1912 he returned to Sweden to study music and dance at the drama school of Elin Svensson. (Note: Swedish actress (1860–1947))

The young artist exhibited with the male-only Avant-garde group "De unga" (1907–1911), an association that defied the Royal Swedish Academy of Fine Arts. During the 1911 exhibition Nerman's drawings were shown alongside sculptures by Ivar Johnsson, graphics by Artur Sahlén, and miniatures by Fanny Falkner. (Note: The only woman who ever joined the exhibition.)

He provided illustrations for "The Swineherd" (1912) by Hans Christian Andersen and "Gösta Berlings: pictures" (1916). (Note: The novel saga by Swedish author Selma Lagerlöf) He also illustrated the children's picture books Crow's Dream (1911), Stars (1913), and illustrations for the novel Short Cavalier stories (1918) by Selma Lagerlöf.

In 1918 he met Ivor Novello in a night-club in Stockholm who suggested Nerman should draw the stars of the West End of London.

In 1919 he visited London as a ballet dancer, performing in a variety at the London Coliseum. When he discovered that they were to tour the provincial music halls as well, he broke his contract and returned to Sweden.

== Career ==
In 1921 Nerman moved to London to work on a weekly page of theatrical caricatures for The Tatler. He also submitted caricatures of musicians performing at the Royal Albert Hall and elsewhere to the fashionable magazine Eve: The Lady's Pictorial. When his friend Ivor Novello opened the "Fifty-fifty" club for theater people, Nerman was asked to decorate the walls.

In 1923 he published the children's book Knight Finn Komfusenfej.

In 1925 he collaborated with Christine Doorman (Note: Also known as Christina Doorman (Utrecht, 31 May 1858 – The Hague, 18 November 1941), she was a Dutch writer and translator who sometimes wrote under the pseudonyms Alma and Christine.) on Selma Lagerlöf: her life and works in Mårbacka.

He made the illustrations for the 1928 edition of Thumbelina, (Note: New York: The Macmillan Company) by Hans Christian Andersen.

In 1929 he published Darlings of the gods: in music hall, revue, and musical comedy to compile his caricatures of theater stars featured in The Tatler since 1922. The same year his caricatures were in The second minuet by English composer Maurice Besly, with foreword by British novelist Alec Waugh.

In 1930, Nerman returned to Sweden and bought Hersbyholm, an 18th-century house in Lidingö. By then, he and his wife Kajsa Susanne had three children.

During World War II the family relocated to New York City where Nerman was hired by the New York Journal-American to draw Hollywood stars like Joan Crawford and Alfred Hitchcock, among them Swedish friends Greta Garbo and Ingrid Bergman. (Note: One of which was used on a postage stamp in 2005, to commemorate the centenary of the actor's birth.) In 1939 he published A trip to gingerbread land.

In 1944 Nerman published Portraits by Nerman. In 1946 he published Caricature and illustrated Fairy Tales from the North, a collection of fairy tales from Denmark, Sweden and Norway by Peter Christen Asbjørnsen.

In 1950 Nerman returned to Lidingö where he became a member of the Association of Swedish Professional Illustrators and Graphic Designers. In 1964 he illustrated "The Goose Girl" (Note: Doubleday (publisher), New York City) by the Brothers Grimm. In 1969 he published The wedding in Valpköping and other animal tales. (Note: Editors were B. Wahlström in Stockholm.) He died in 1983.

== Legacy ==
Nerman acknowledged he was influenced during his youth by oriental artists, Norwegian artist Olaf Gulbransson, (Note: In "Caricatures" Nerman praises his drawings for the satirical German magazine "Simplicissimus"(p. 15)) and Henri Matisse; later on also by Aubrey Beardsley and Ralph Barton.

He made the illustrations for many of the books of Swedish Nobel Prize in Literature Selma Lagerlöf and earned a name in his country for designing all images behind the Solstickan matchbox. (Note: In 1936 Nerman was commissioned to design the label for the box. He draw his own son above the text "For the benefit of children and the old". The idea was to contribute a few pennies to the Solstickan Foundation which helps disabled or chronically ill children.) He also made many of the artistic book covers for his brother Birger's published writings and wrote songs and composed music to many of his brother Ture's poems.

In 2020 his portraits (Note: Coal, chalk and watercolor on paper laid on panel) of Einar Jolin (1908), Isaac Grünewald (1907), Hanna Maria Sahlström in an interior (1911) were sold at auction.

== Gallery ==
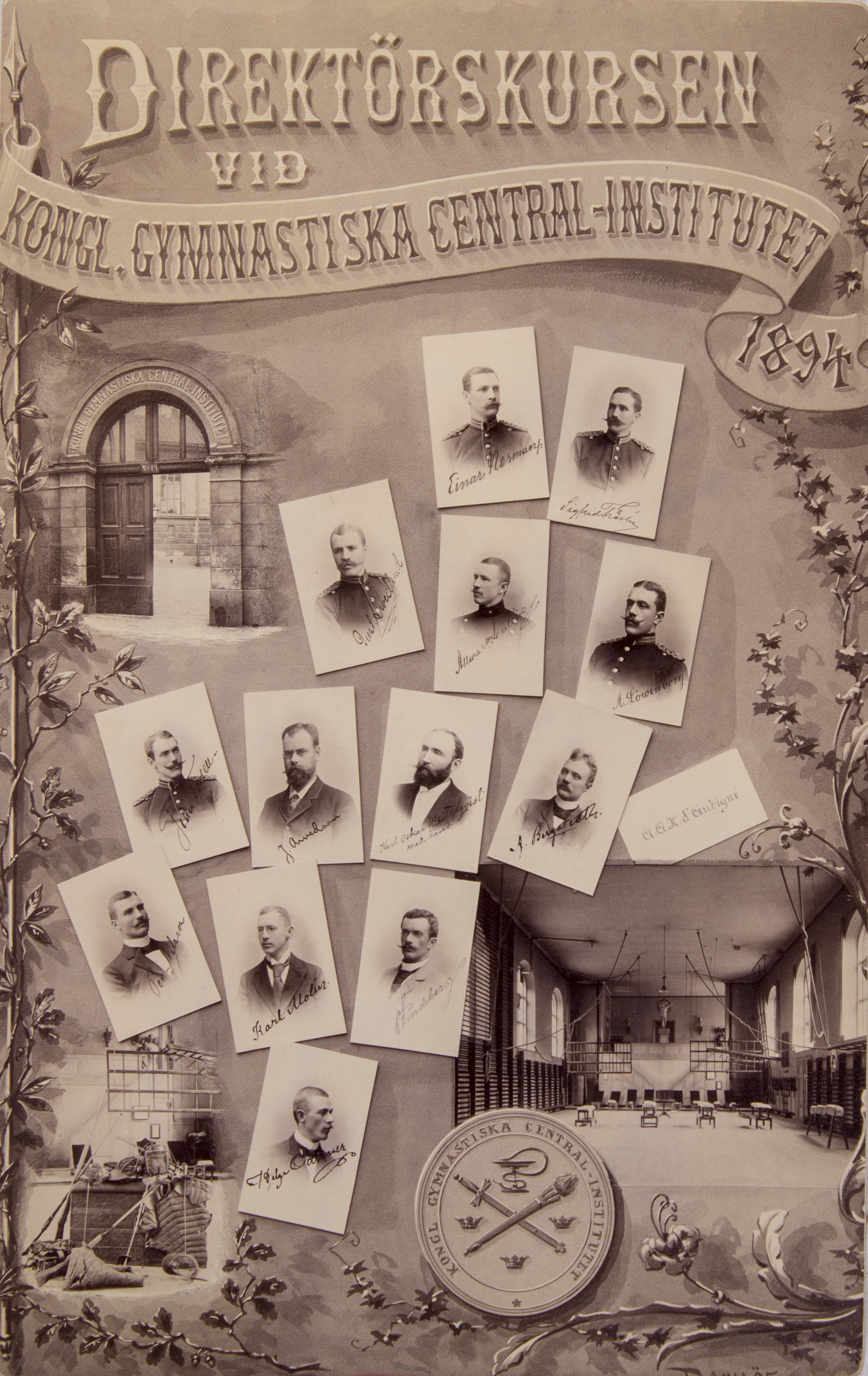
Norrköping Gymnasium High School 1894

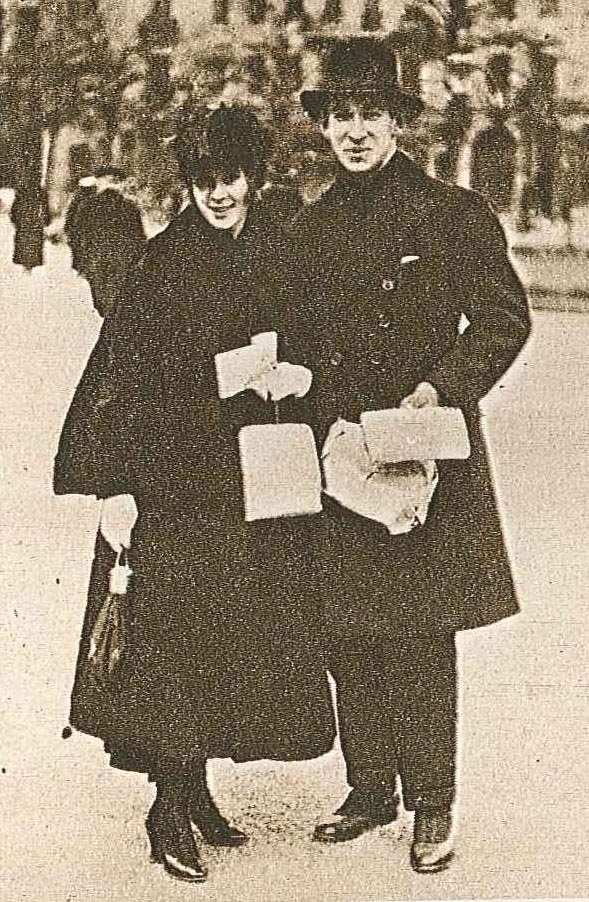
Einar and Kajsa on their wedding day

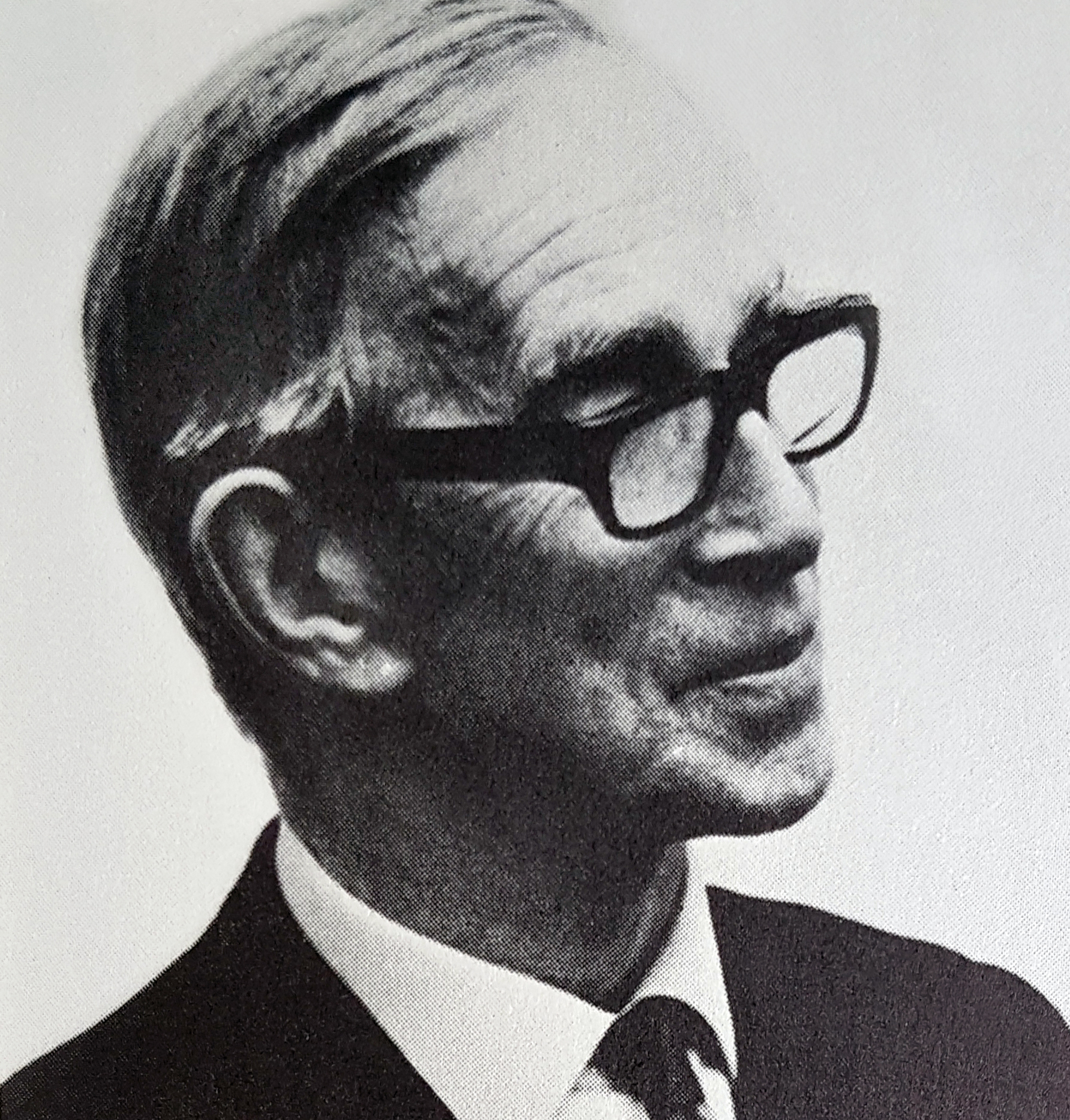
Einar Nerman

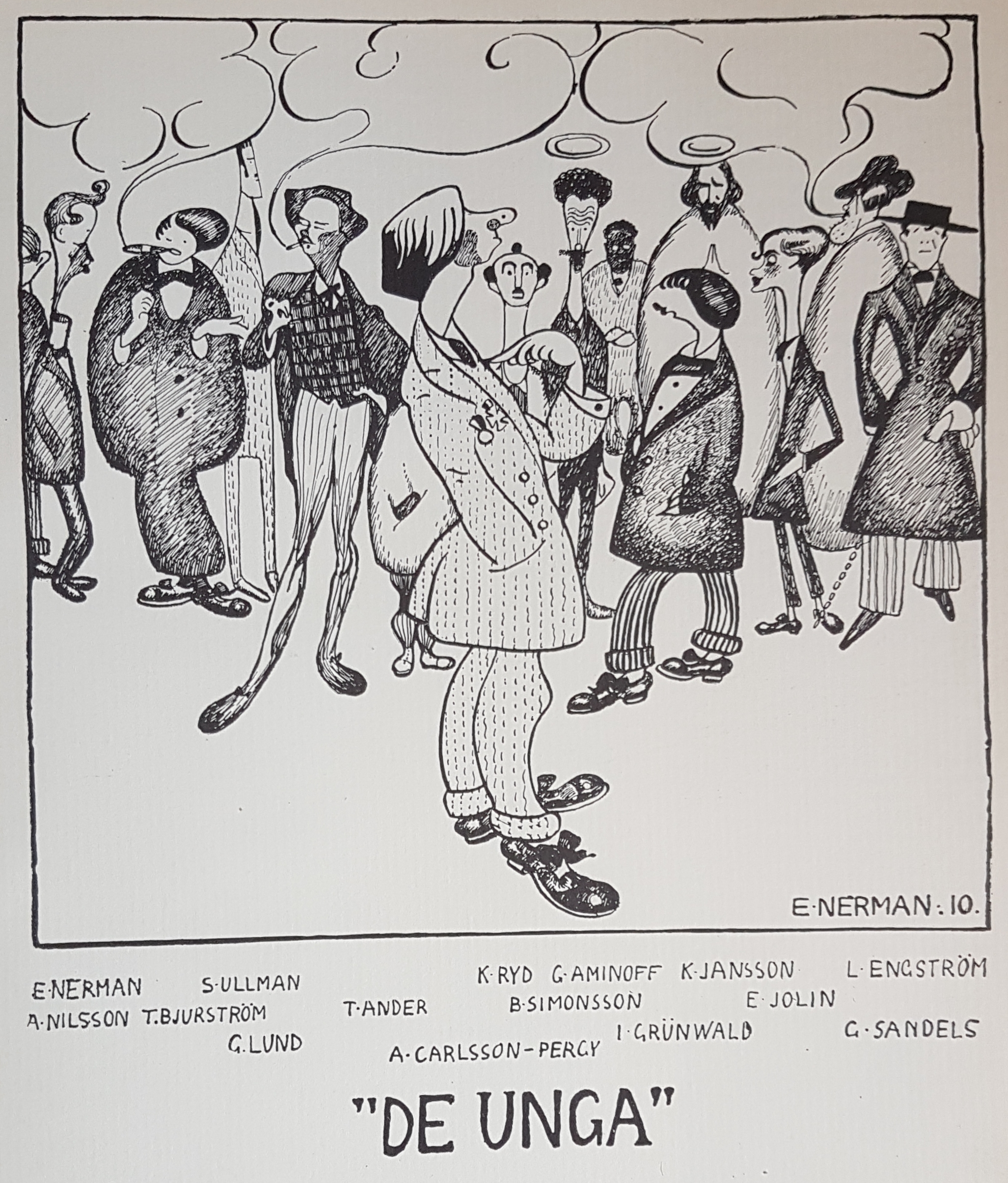
Young artists

== Sources ==
- Einar Nerman: "Caricature", Holme Press Incorporated, 1946.
- Sandy Wilson: "Caught in the act", George G. Harrap & Co. Ltd, Great Britain 1976.
- Maria Nikolajeva, Carole Scott: "How picturebooks work", Psychology Press, 2001, p. 60.
- Elina Druker, Bettina Kümmerling-Meibauer: "Childrens books in the avant-garde", John Benjamins Publishing Company, 2015, pp. 45, 49, 62 & 63.
