= Isaac Grünewald =

Swedish artist (1889–1946)

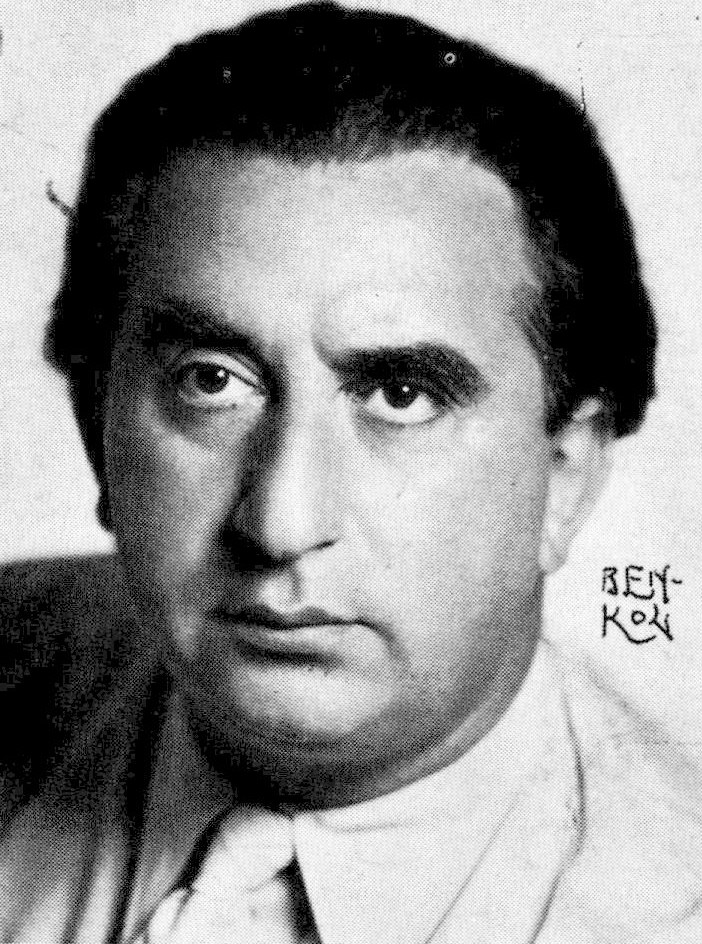
- Isaac Grünewald
- Born: 2 September 1889; Stockholm, Sweden
- Died: 22 May 1946 (aged 56); Oslo, Norway
- Known for: Painting; Scenography
- Movement: Modernism; Expressionism

Isaac Grünewald (2 September 1889 – 22 May 1946) was a Swedish-Jewish expressionist painter born in Stockholm. He was the leading and central name in the first generation of Swedish modernists from 1910 up until his death in 1946, in other words during almost his entire career spanning four decades. He was a highly productive painter as well as a writer and public speaker.

== Biography ==
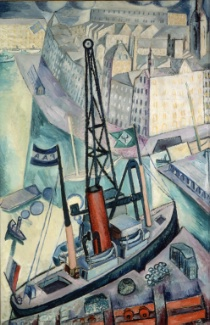
The Crane (1915) by Isaac Grünewald

Having studied at an influential Swedish art school for three years, at age 19 Grünewald travelled with his friends Einar Jolin and Einar Nerman to Paris where they soon began studies at Henri Matisse's academy. In 1909 he gained recognition in his homeland when he exhibited his work with a group of Scandinavian artists known as The Young Ones.

He met his future wife Sigrid Hjertén in 1909 and encouraged her to study painting with him in Paris. Having married in 1911, Grünewald and Hjertén from 1912 on regularly exhibited together at home and abroad. Art historians nowadays often cite them as being responsible for introducing modernism to Sweden. At a time in history when antisemitism was both widespread and politically correct and women artists were frowned upon, their works were often the subject of ridicule in the press. In fact, recent research has shown that Grünewald who became the center of public controversy numerous times was the primary target of antisemitism in the Swedish press between 1910 and 1926.

Despite, or because of, his role as a leading and controversial pioneer in Swedish modernism, he is still sometimes portrayed as the embodiment of a classic Jewish caricature in Swedish journalism and literature due to insinuations that he did not earn his success fairly, being an insignificant Matisse imitator as an artist but a better businessman.

In the 1920s, Grünewald began reaping major commercial successes. He created stage designs for the Royal Swedish Opera and other theaters. In 1925-26, he decorated the walls and ceiling in the minor hall (since renamed Grünewald Hall) at the Stockholm Concert Hall, site of the Nobel Prize ceremony, and in 1928 the walls of the Matchstick Palace. His work was part of the painting event in the art competition at the 1932 Summer Olympics.

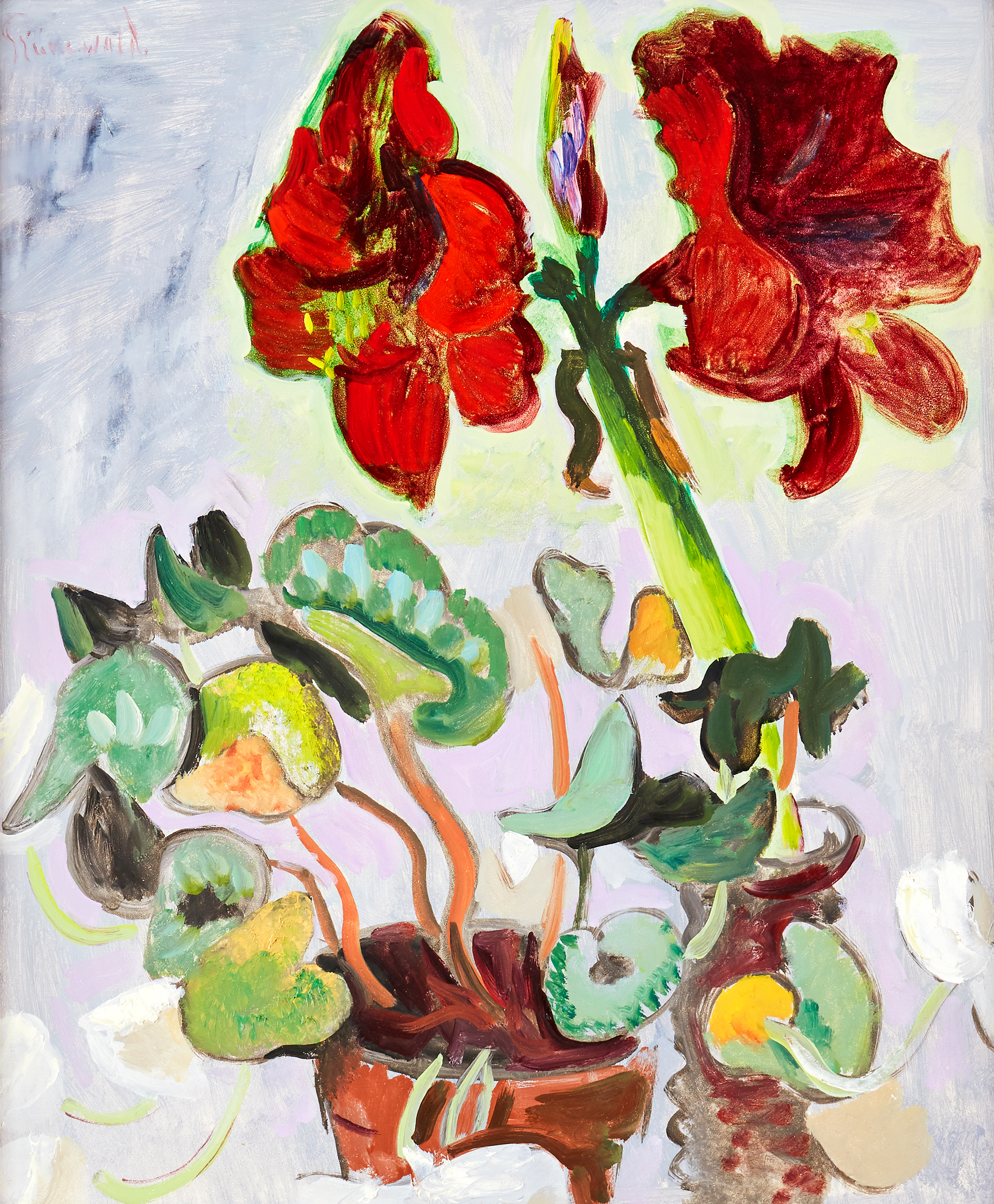
Still life with Amaryllis

Grünewald was a professor at the Royal Swedish Academy of Arts between 1932 and 1942 and in 1941 he opened his own art school (Emil Clahr student). During the Second World War Grünewald worked at the renowned Rörstrand porcelain factory. He was awarded the Prince Eugen Medal in 1945.

His wife Sigrid Hjertén suffered from lifelong mental health problems that resulted in her being hospitalized for extended periods in the 1930s. Grünewald divorced Hjertén, who was then hospitalized permanently, in 1937 and remarried. In 1946 he and his second wife Märta Grundell were killed in an airplane crash. Grünewald was the father of three sons born in 1910, 1911 and 1940.

== Manifesto ==
The author of numerous essays on art, during his influential 1918 exhibit at Stockholm's Liljevalchs Konsthall Isaac Grünewald published his manifesto The New Renaissance.

== Commercial value ==
According to the Swedish copyright organization BUS, Grünewald is still the single artist whose sales bring the highest yearly income to Swedish art dealers among the modernists. At Stockholm auctionist Bukowski's spring auction in 2009, one of Grünewald's lesser known paintings was sold for 2.65 million crowns - about 340,000 US dollars.
