= Friends of the Children =

American nonprofit

- Formation: 1993; 33 years ago
- Founder: Duncan Campbell
- Type: Non-profit
- Tax ID no.: 93-1300690
- Headquarters: Portland, Oregon, U.S.
- Region served: United States
- Website: friendsofthechildren.org

Friends of the Children is an American nonprofit organization that provides professional mentorship to at-risk youth, beginning in kindergarten and through the completion of its program at high school graduation. It was founded in 1993 by Duncan Campbell.

== History ==
Friends of the Children was founded in 1993 by Duncan Campbell to provide professional mentorship for at-risk youth. He was inspired by his own difficult childhood, having been raised in Portland, Oregon, by parents who struggled with alcoholism. Additionally, his father served two separate sentences in prison. Funding for Friends of the Children was created through the sale of Campbell’s timber investment fund in 1989. The organization grew out of the Campbell Institute for Children, an early iteration of Friends of the Children, founded in 1992. Early benefactors of the nonprofit included the Meyer Memorial Trust, U.S. Bank, and Hasbro Children’s Foundation.

In 1998, Public/Private Ventures, a research organization, conducted a preliminary assessment of the effectiveness and replication potential of Friends of the Children’s program, deeming it to be “worthy of further investigation”. In 1999, a new chapter was approved to open, which preceded a wave of expansion for the nonprofit. A new nonprofit was created to oversee the expansion of Friends of the Children in 2000.

In 2002, Friends of the Children received a $1.5 million grant from the Edna McConnell Clark Foundation. The grant was gifted shortly after the appointment of Catherine Milton, founder of the Haas Center for Public Service, as the president of the national nonprofit. Approximately $500,000 of that grant went towards a $6 million study into Friends of the Children’s programs, determining their effectiveness. By 2004, Friends of the Children began seeking funding along the East Coast of the United States, and in that year, it was serving 600 children through 11 local chapters. Following this, in 2005, Friends of the Children for King County was a recipient of a $100,000 grant from the Fordham Street Foundation, founded by Julie Bigelow, who at one time was a partner in the Preston Gates & Ellis law firm and one of the owners of the Seattle Mariners.

In 2011, Friends of the Children was operating in six cities, including New York and Boston.

Through 2014, Friends of the Children operated 5 chapters. The organization received a $4 million grant from the Corporation for National and Community Service in 2016, with the purpose of studying the nonprofit’s programs and allowing it to expand. It would receive an additional $1.2 million grant from the Social Innovation Fund in 2017, allowing the nonprofit to create programs in the San Francisco-based neighborhoods of Bayview and Hunters Point. Friends of the Children partnered with HOPE SF, an initiative created by the mayor’s office, to renovate distressed public housing sites.

In 2018, Friends of the Children received support from Michael Jordan, who donated all proceeds from the creation of The Last Dance to the organization, totaling millions of dollars to help Friends of the Children reach a $25 million fundraising goal.

By 2019, Friends of the Children operated in 15 cities in the United States, including Los Angeles, Seattle, Chicago, Charlotte, and Austin. The organization received support from the Why Not You Foundation, a philanthropic organization run by Russell Wilson.

In 2021, Simone Biles became an ambassador for Friends of the Children, speaking about her experiences in foster care and the support the nonprofit provides to children in foster care. During her Gold Over America tour, Biles donated $50,000 towards the opening of a Houston chapter for the organization. Biles would later highlight Friends of the Children through her appearance on a 2023 Wheaties box.

In 2022, MacKenzie Scott donated $44 million to the Friends of the Children, giving $15 million to the organization’s national headquarters and splitting $29 million across 12 of the organization’s chapters, including Tampa Bay, Detroit, and Los Angeles. Prior to the donation, Friends of the Children’s national budget was $50 million for the year. Through that same year, the organization had expanded to 26 chapters, including an expansion into Colorado and Rapid City, South Dakota, where Friends of the Children opened its He Sapa chapter, focusing on supporting Indigenous youth from the Pine Ridge Indian Reservation.

In 2023, Friends of the Children received a $33 million donation from philanthropists Gary and Christine Rood. A portion of the donation was used to fund the Duncan and Cindy Campbell National Center of Excellence, a "learning hub for long-term mentoring" in Portland, Oregon. Through that year, Friends of the Children operated 26 chapters in 36 sites across 19 states and Tribal sovereign nations.

In December 2025, Friends of the Children’s network received a $200,000 grant from the National Football League. The nonprofit had previously received support from the Chicago Bears, and was represented by New England Patriots wide receiver DeMario Douglas, who wore cleats depicting Friends of the Children branding for the league’s My Cleats Initiative. By the end of 2025, Friends of the Children had expanded to 44 locations.

At the end of September 2026, Friends of the Children opened the Duncan and Cindy Campbell National Center of Excellence for Professional Youth Mentoring, a campus for the nonprofit located in the Albina neighborhood of Portland, Oregon.

== Program ==
Friends of the Children’s mentorship program hires and pays professional mentors, known as "Friends", who are then responsible for eight children individually. Before a Friend is paired with a family, they undergo specialized training and experience working with individuals suffering from trauma. The children are selected while they are in kindergarten, and the program operates until the child graduates from high school. The Friend spends four hours with each of their students each week, two of which are in a classroom setting, and the other two helping the student with extracurricular activities. Children selected for the program include those who have been in foster care, have families that are on welfare, or have parents who have been incarcerated. Friends of the Children seeks to support both the children participating in the program and their parents or guardians through its "2gen" approach.

While Friends of the Children is a national organization, it operates via local chapters. In starting a local chapter, the nonprofit requires a new chapter to raise approximately three years of operating income in advance, totaling around $1.5 million, where no more than 40% of the funding can come from one individual source. Previous donors to local chapters include Michael Jordan (Chicago and Charlotte, North Carolina), Steve and Connie Ballmer (Seattle and Los Angeles), and Rachel Arnold, then a partner at Vista Equity Partners (Austin, Texas).

=== Outcomes ===
Through internal studies, Friends of the Children recorded "that the intensive interaction helped build trust, increased the children’s positive social behavior and was more likely to keep the children out of trouble." Additionally, children paired with a mentor often improved their relationship with their parent or caregiver.

A study from researchers at the University of Washington and Washington State University showed that pairing a child with a mentor "provided children and their caregivers with a consistency and continuity that was critical to the program’s success." Additionally, a study into the mentors and their interactions with families by the Annie E. Casey Foundation found that Friends of the Children connected "the entire family to resources such as counseling, transportation assistance and material resources such as food and clothing", empowered "caregiver participation in school-related activities, such as supporting special needs and navigating individualized education planning", and supported "youth to self-regulate and build positive relationships while also helping caregivers to navigate behavioral challenges."

According to statistics found in a 2023 Philadelphia Citizen article, "83% of Friends participants earn a high school degree, and 92% of those individuals enroll in post-secondary education, enter the military or join the workforce, and 93% avoid the juvenile justice system. Nearly 100% hold off on having children until after their teen years".

A study conducted by the Harvard Business School Association of Oregon into Friends of the Children mentees found that for every dollar invested, "the community benefits by $7 in saved social costs and that each child who completes the program saves the local community $900,000 in justice system, health care and teen parenting costs."

In a 2017 study, it was determined that children who had participated in a Friends of the Children program exhibited higher "emotional strength" and were less disruptive in school.

== Recognition ==
Friends of the Children has received praise from the Annie E. Casey Foundation and researchers from Stanford University and the University of Washington.

Kim Starkey Jonker, lecturer at Stanford Business School, wrote about Friends of the Children in her book Engine of Impact, praising the organization for its ratio of mentors to students, allowing for replicable results.

In 2012, Friends of the Children founder Duncan Campbell was honored at the 84th Annual Portland First Citizen Award Banquet. Then-House representative Earl Blumenauer, who could not attend the event, praised Friends of the Children in a speech on the House floor.

In 2022, Friends of the Children appeared on a segment of The Ellen DeGeneres Show, guest-hosted by Ciara, where it was praised for its mentorship work.
