= Solstickan =

Swedish foundation for aiding children in need

Solstickan is a Swedish charity foundation founded in 1936 for aiding children in need. Its ruling board is appointed by the Swedish government. The money for the foundation is gathered through the sales of the Solstickan matchbox or lighter which over the years have become the most well known and purchased matchbox in Sweden. The art work of the matchbox was made in 1936 by the artist Einar Nerman and is a painting of his own son.

Today, the money from the Solstickan foundation goes mostly to science and research in child diseases.
