= Hersbyholm =

Coordinates: 59.3658°N 18.1550°E

Hersbyholm is known as the oldest and biggest farm in Lidingö, Sweden. The farm includes a manor, and is situated near the neighbourhood of Hersby. The farm has had several different owners through its lifetime and has been inhabited by different powerful landowners.

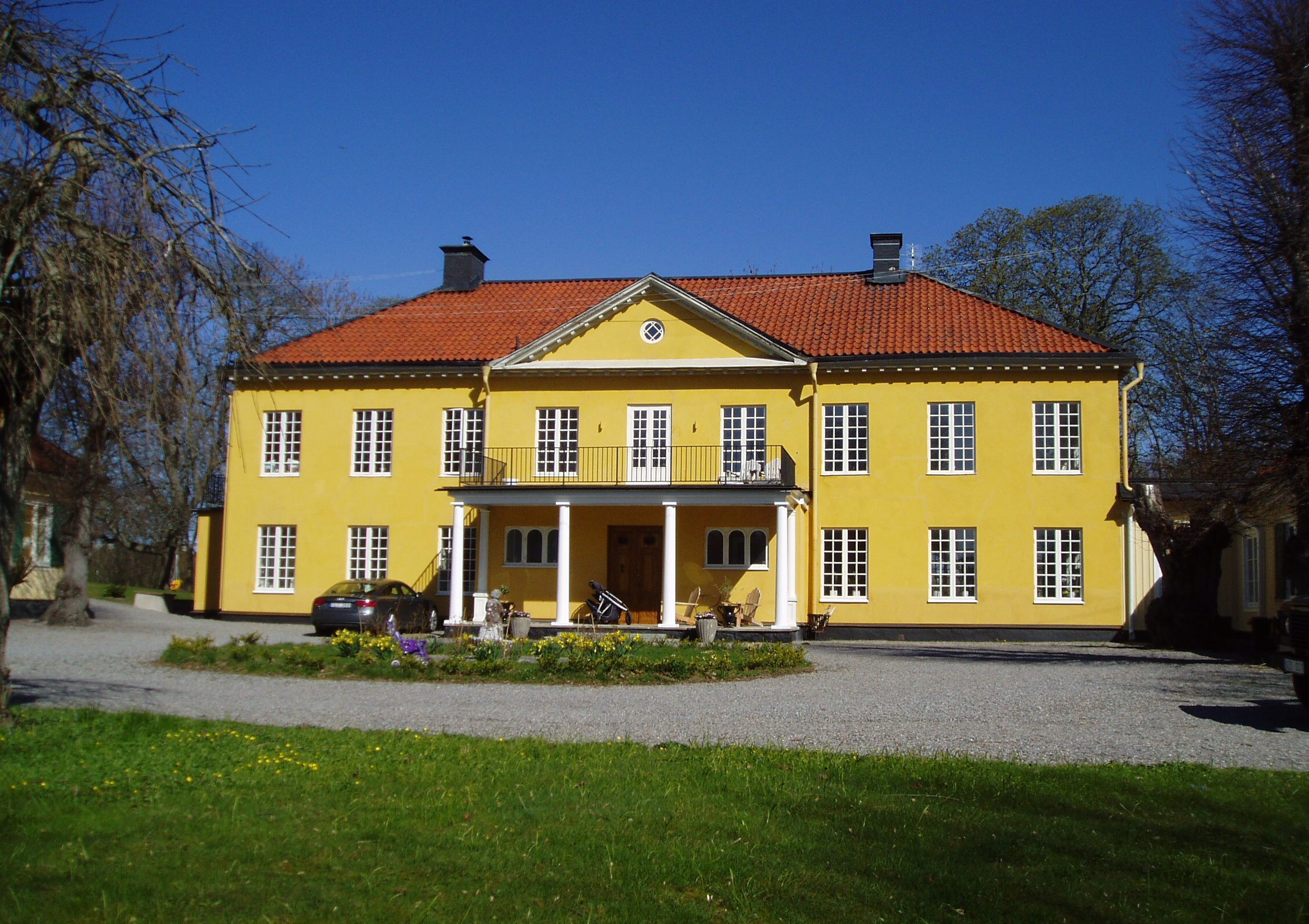
Hersbyholm manor in 2012.

The farm dates back to the 1400s. The farm was long known as one of the biggest agriculture farms in Lidingö. In the 13th century owned by Bo Jonsson who obtained the farm through an exchange with the son of Bridget of Sweden.

Hersbyholm was taken over and owned by the Banérs family from Djursholm Castle at the end of the 14th century. When they eventually started to sell parts of Lidingö in 1774, the farm was bought by the auditor Johan Falkson who earlier had leased the farm from the Banérs.

In 1920, Hersbyholm was bought by the farmer Karl Lindbom (1787–1849), one of the first men who had gotten the epithet "King of Lidingö". The country state was rebuilt by the then "King of Lidingö" Jan Zetterberg (1810–1878) who also named the farm Hersbyholm. The farm was inherited by his children, while the agriculture region was rented out. Great areas of the land were sold out in the early 19th century to AB Lidingö Villastad which were divided and sold it as plots of land.

Hersbyholm was bought by Carl von Heidenstam in 1921, and was nine years later bought by the artist Einar Nerman (1888–1983).

== Sources ==
- https://web.archive.org/web/20081206044556/http://lidingo-hembygdsforening.org.loopiadns.com/
