= Sigrid Hjertén =

Swedish modernist painter (1885–1948)

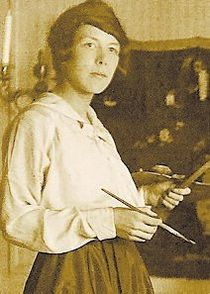
- Sigrid Hjertén at work
- Born: 27 October 1885; Sundsvall, Sweden
- Died: 24 March 1948 (aged 62); Stockholm, Sweden
- Known for: Painting
- Movement: Modernism

Sigrid Maria Hjertén (27 October 1885 – 24 March 1948) was a Swedish modernist painter. Hjertén is considered a major figure in Swedish modernism. Periodically she was highly productive and participated in 106 exhibitions. She worked as an artist for thirty years before dying of complications from a lobotomy, after having been diagnosed with schizophrenia in 1932.

== Biography ==
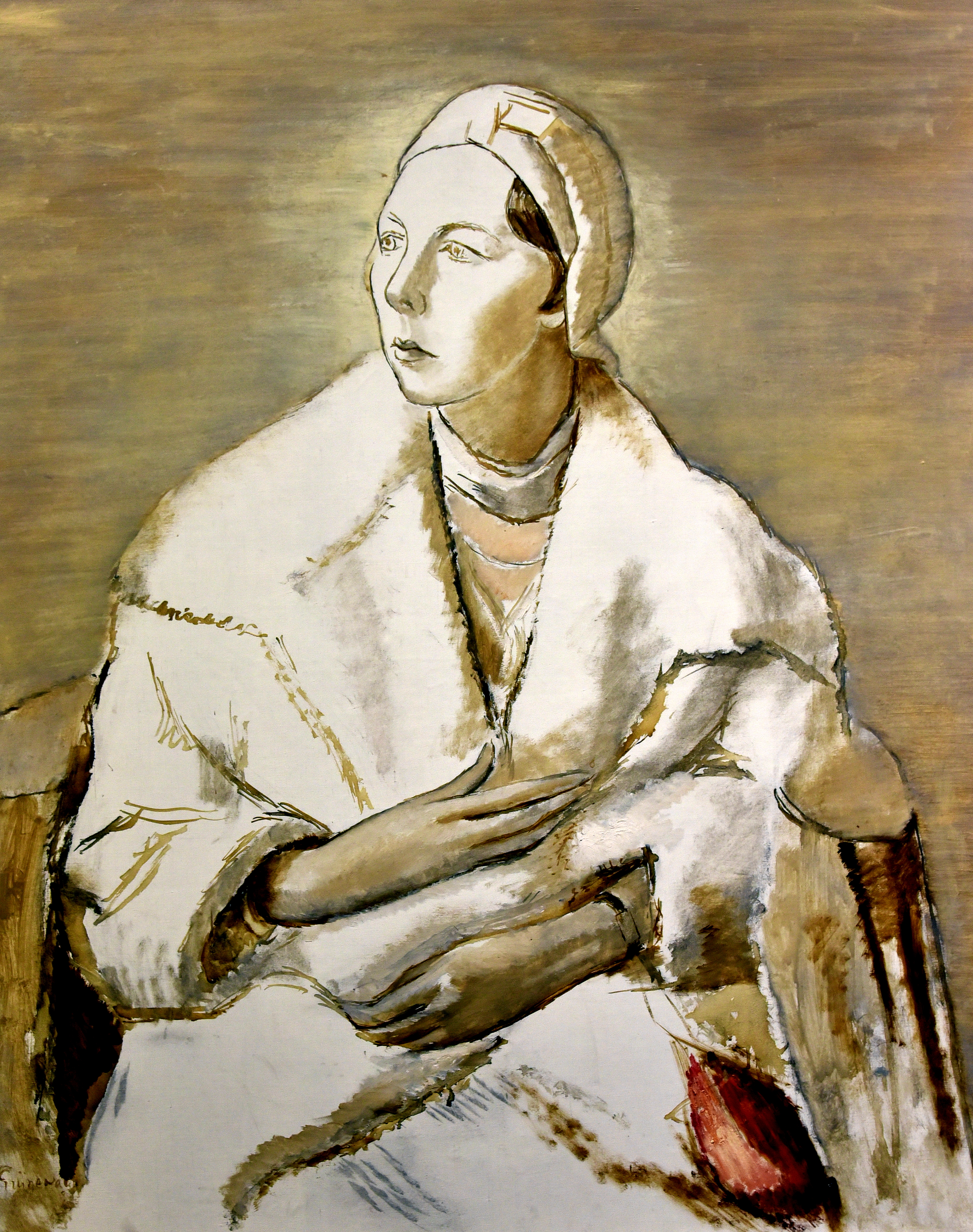
Sigrid Hjertén, by Isaac Grünewald. Nationalmuseum, Stockholm, Sweden

Sigrid Hjertén was born the 27th of October 1885 in Sundsvall. Her mother, Maria Hjertén (born Rahm) died in May 1888, when Hjertén was two and half years old. Her father, Svante Hjertén, remarried and the family moved to Stockholm in November 1897. She studied at the University College of Arts, Crafts and Design in Stockholm and graduated as a drawing teacher and textile artist. At a studio party in 1909, Hjertén met her future husband, twenty-year-old Isaac Grünewald, who had already studied one year with Henri Matisse in Paris. Grünewald convinced her that she would do herself more justice as a painter after having seen her textile works at the Art Industry Exhibition (Konstindustriutställningen) in Stockholm. Later that year she went to Matisse's art school as well. She was "said to have been Matisse's favorite pupil because of her fine sense of color."

=== 1910s ===
As Hjertén studied under Henri Matisse in Paris, she was impressed with the way he and Paul Cézanne dealt with colour. She developed a style of contrasting colour fields and simplified contours. Her aesthetic intentions had primarily to do with colour, and in her later works from the 1930s she spoke of colours in terms such as cold yellow. Hjertén strove to find forms and colours that could convey her emotions. In that respect her work is more closely related to the German Expressionists, such as Ernst Ludwig Kirchner, than to the French painters, with their graceful play of lines.

During her time in Paris, Hjertén developed a closer relationship with Isaac Grünewald, and the couple lived together in the late spring of 1911. In the summer of the same year Hjertén discovered she was pregnant, which ultimately led to a marriage between her and Isaac in November 1911. Their son Iván Grünewald was born just a few weeks later. In 1912 Hjertén participated in a group show in Stockholm. It was her debut exhibition as a painter. In the following ten years she took part in many exhibitions both in Sweden and abroad, among other places in Berlin in 1915, where she was well received. Hjertén was also represented at the Expressionist Exhibition at the Liljevalch's konsthall in Stockholm in 1918, together with two other artists. However, the contemporary critics were not enthusiastic about her art.

In Hjertén's art, where she greatly exposes herself, one notices different stages of development. The influence of Matisse is perhaps mostly discernible in the 1910s. During this decade, Hjertén created many paintings with indoor pictures and views from her home, first at Kornhamnstorg Square in Gamla Stan, and later at Katarinavägen Street on Södermalm, in Stockholm. Her husband Isaac Grünewald and her son Iván, as well as Sigrid herself, are often depicted in scenes that embrace various sorts of conflicts. At this time Hjertén got acquainted with and inspired by the art made by Ernst Josephson during his illness.

=== Ateljéinteriör ===
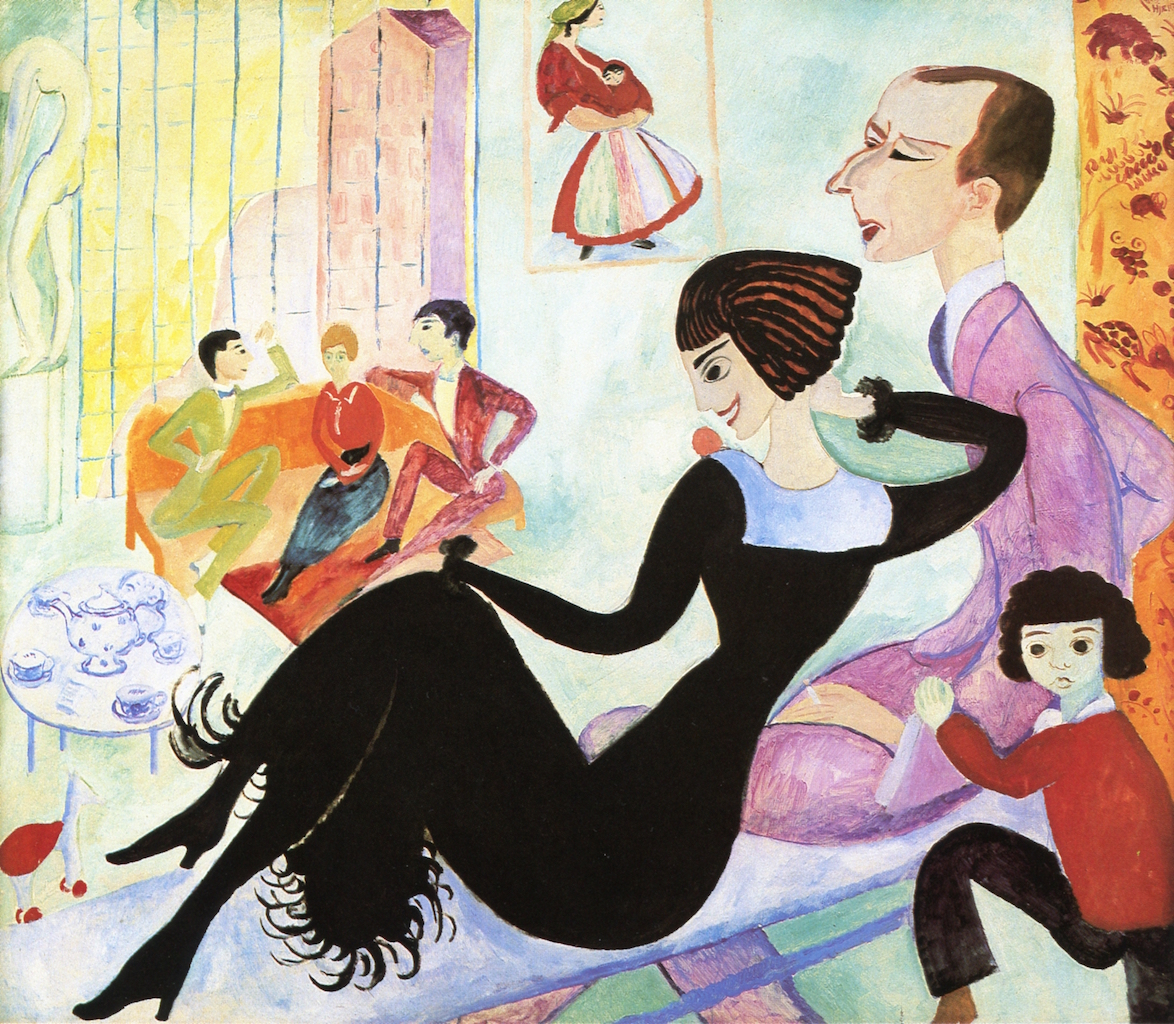
Ateljéinteriör 1916 - One of Hjerténs most iconic works.

Ateljéinteriör (Studio interior) from 1916 shows how radical Hjertén was for her time. The painting describes the roles she played as artist, woman, and mother: different identities in different worlds. Hjertén sits on the sofa between two artists – her husband, Isaac Grünewald, and, perhaps, Einar Jolin – who talk to each other over her head. Her large blue eyes stare into the distance. In the foreground a woman dressed in black – a sophisticated alter ego – leans against a male figure who might be the artist Nils Dardel. Her son Iván crawls out of the right-hand corner. In the background we glimpse one of Hjertén's paintings of the period, Zigenarkvinna (Gypsy woman).

Ateljéinteriör and Den röda rullgardinen (The Red Blind), from 1916, are daring paintings that have given rise in recent years to new interpretations based on contemporary gender studies and reveal information about the artist's private life.

=== 1920s ===
Between 1920 and 1932, Hjertén and her family lived in Paris, and made many excursions to the French countryside and the Italian Riviera for painting. This was a relatively harmonious era in Hjertén's art, but her exhibits were very limited in this period. Her husband often visited Stockholm where he had a brilliant career, for example designing sets and costumes for the Royal Swedish Opera.

As time passed, an increasing tension can be seen in her art. In the late 1920s, while she was very isolated in France, colder and darker colours began to appear in her paintings. Recurring diagonal strokes helped to give the paintings a tense impression.

In the late 1920s Hjertén increasingly had various psychosomatic ailments, and she complained of loneliness.

=== 1930s ===
In 1932 the family moved back to Stockholm, as Isaac had acquired a position as professor at the Royal Swedish Academy of fine arts. Due to this, Hjertén had was left alone with the move from Paris. Due to her already fragile mental and physical health, she ended up collapsing, and was shortly after flown back home to Sweden. Once in Sweden, she was diagnosed with schizophrenia and stayed at several different private health institutions and psychiatric hospitals where she recovered periodically. In the following two years (1932–1934) Hjertén's artistry culminated in a crescendo, where, like one possessed, she made pictures that expressed strongly loaded feelings. She devoted herself to intensive painting, creating one picture a day, the picture-book of her life, according to an interview in the Swedish art magazine Paletten. Hjertén's paintings of this period are often characterized by menacing tones, growing storm clouds, and feelings of abandonment. Some paintings radiate horror while others give a warm and harmonious impression.

During 1934, she traveled with her family in the south of Europe, where she painted. Hjertén eventually made her name as an artist among the critics in 1935, when she exhibited with her husband and son in Gothenburg. She was given the most space in the exhibition, and was also praised by multiple critics.

She fully won public recognition in 1936, when she had a well-received solo exhibition at the Royal Swedish Academy of fine Arts in Stockholm. "After viewing the nearly 500 works in her 1936 retrospective, the critics were unanimous: the exhibition was hailed as one of the most remarkable of the season and Hjerten was honored as one of Sweden's greatest and most original modern artists. Thus, she gained recognition—but too late."

In 1936, Hjertén was admitted to Beckomberga Psychiatric Hospital where she would remain for the last twelve years of her life. Isaac, who had many mistresses over the years, divorced Hjertén and remarried in 1937. That same year, Hjertén stopped painting for good. Both Isaac and his new wife later died in a plane accident in 1946.

Following a botched lobotomy, Hjertén died in Stockholm in 1948.

=== Legacy ===
Hjertén's total production amounted to slightly more than 500 paintings, together with sketches, water-colours and drawings. Hjertén had to fight the prejudices of her time throughout her career. Her paintings seem extremely personal for the era in which they were made, when issues of colour and form were uppermost in artists' minds. Her interest in humankind was often manifested in dramatic, even theatrical compositions, while her approach to colour was emotional as well as theoretical.
