= Sonal Shah (economist) =

American economist

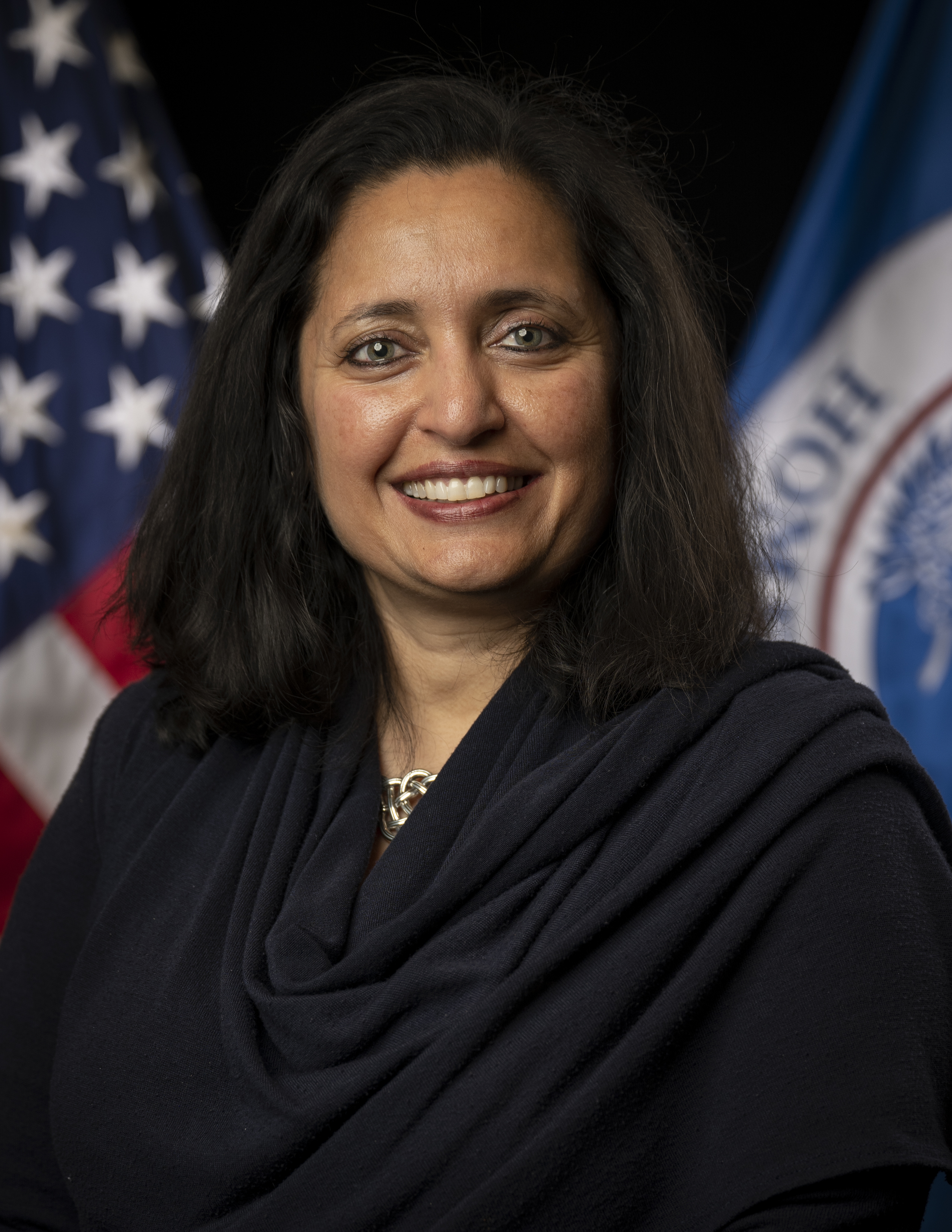

Personal details
- Born: May 20, 1968 (age 57) Mumbai, India
- Party: Democratic
- Education: University of Chicago (BA); Duke University (MA)

Sonal Ramesh Shah (Gujarati: સોનલ રમેશ શાહ; born May 20, 1968) is an American economist and public official. She was the CEO of The Texas Tribune, a politics and public policy-specific nonprofit news organization headquartered in Austin, Texas from January 2023 until December 2025. Shah served as the National Policy Director for Mayor Pete Buttigieg's run in the 2020 United States presidential election. From April 2009 to August 2011, she served as the director of the Office of Social Innovation and Civic Participation in the White House.

Shah was the founding executive director of the Beeck Center for Social Impact & Innovation at Georgetown University. Previously, Shah was a member of the Obama presidential transition team and was the head of Global Development Initiatives, a philanthropic arm of Google.org.

== Early life ==
Sonal Shah was born in Mumbai, India to Gujarati parents. Her father Ramesh Shah, is originally from Gabat, in the Sabarkanatha district of Gujarat. She moved to the US in 1972 at the age of four, and grew up in Houston, Texas. She graduated from the University of Chicago with a B.A. in economics in 1990 and received a master's degree in economics from Duke University.

== Career ==
=== Public service ===
Shah held a variety of U.S. Department of Treasury positions from 1995 until 2001. She was the director of the office overseeing strategy and programs for sub-Saharan Africa, which included debt relief, development programs and World Bank/International Monetary Fund strategies. She worked with the Ministries of Finance in Bosnia and Kosovo to design the post-war banking system. During the Asian financial crisis, she served as a senior adviser to U.S. Treasury officials who were coordinating the U.S. response.

In November 2008, Shah was appointed a member of the Obama-Biden Transition Project to prepare President-elect Obama to assume the presidency on January 20, 2009. After her appointment to Obama's team, Shah rejected reports that linked her to Hindu nationalist groups.

In April 2009, Shah was appointed director of the newly created White House Office of Social Innovation and Civic Participation. The objective of this office is to coordinate governmental efforts to aid innovative nonprofit groups and social entrepreneurs to address pressing social problems. Shah is also working with the National Security Council to bring a global perspective to these efforts.

In July 2019, Shah joined the presidential campaign of South Bend Mayor, Pete Buttigieg as national policy director.

After Joe Biden secured the nomination in the 2020 Democratic Party presidential primaries, Shah served on the Biden-Sanders Unity Task Force.

In February 2022, Shah was sworn in as Chief Commissioner of the newly created President's Advisory Commission on Asian Americans, Native Hawaiians and Pacific Islanders (PACAANHPI). In March 2022, Shah was appointed as a member of the Homeland Security Advisory Council.

=== Private and nonprofit sector ===
From 2001 to 2003, Shah served at the Center for Global Development as Director of Operations and Programs, helping set up all aspects of the strategy, infrastructure and operations. In 2001, with her siblings Roopal and Anand, Shah founded the nonprofit Indicorps, which, akin to the Peace Corps, is a service fellowship for young Indians in the diaspora to perform grassroots and community volunteer work in India.

From 2003 to 2004, she worked at the Center for American Progress as an associate director, advising current and former congressional and government executives on a wide variety of issues including trade, outsourcing and post-conflict reconstruction.

In 2004, Shah joined Goldman Sachs as a vice president, where she worked on green initiatives, which included informing clients and bankers on alternative energy opportunities and advising them on how to implement environmental, social and governance criteria for all investments.

In 2007, Shah joined Google.org as the head of Global Development Initiatives, and worked closely with Executive Director Larry Brilliant in guiding global economic development efforts. She also worked extensively on the growth of small and medium sized enterprises in partnership with the Omidyar Network and the Soros Foundation.

In 2021, Shah became the founding president of The Asian American Foundation (TAAF).

On January 1, 2023, Shah became the CEO of the nonprofit newsroom The Texas Tribune. . She announced in April of 2025 that she would step down in December, after completing three years as CEO.

== Board Memberships ==
Shah is a board member of The Century Foundation, Consumer Reports, and Internews.

== Awards and recognition ==
- 2003: India Abroad Person of the Year
- 2006: Henry Crown Fellowship, Aspen Institute
- 2007: Next Generation Fellow, American Assembly, Columbia University
- 2012: Fall Fellow, Harvard Kennedy School Institute of Politics

== Papers and articles ==
- Guiding Principles and Design of the MCA
- Trading Views
- Served on Commission for Weak States and National Security, Center for Global Development.
- Social Finance: A Primer, Center for American Progress
