= Michele Jolin =

American social entrepreneur

- Born: America
- Education: University of Wisconsin, Madison (BA); London School of Economics (MS); University of Virginia (JD)

Michele Jolin is an American social entrepreneur and policymaker. She is the CEO and co-founder of Results for America. She is a senior fellow at the Center for American Progress focusing on building a policy environment to support social entrepreneurship. She was appointed by President Obama in December 2010 to be a member of the White House Council for Community Solutions. In 2016, Jolin was elected as a fellow of the National Academy of Public Administration.

== Career ==
Jolin was at the White House as a senior advisor for social innovation, in the newly created Office of Social Innovation and Civic Participation. In that role, she designed the Social Innovation Fund and other policy tools to drive investment toward more innovative and effective solutions for critical social problems. Jolin also served on President Obama's Presidential Transition Team, as chair of the "Innovation in Society" policy working group.

Before serving in the White House, Jolin was a senior fellow at the Center for American Progress, where she headed CAP's presidential transition project and co-edited with Mark Green the book Change for America: A Progressive Blueprint for the 44th President. As a senior fellow, she also authored a number of articles and reports on policy tools to promote innovation and impact in the nonprofit sector, including a Stanford Social Innovation Review (SSIR) piece arguing for a White House Office of Social Innovation.

Through her role with Results for America, Jolin has helped launch and lead initiatives such as the Moneyball for Government campaign and the What Works Cities campaign.

Jolin is the author of numerous policy proposals that provide ideas for policymakers to support social entrepreneurship, including a proposal to create a White House Office of Social Innovation and Civic Participation. In November 2014, she co-authored the national best-seller Moneyball for Government book.

Prior to her tenure at the Center for American Progress and the White House, Jolin was a senior vice president at Ashoka: Innovators for the Public, the largest global network of social entrepreneurs. At Ashoka, she was responsible for launching and managing several global initiatives. Ashoka founder and CEO Bill Drayton is credited with coining the term "social entrepreneur" to describe individuals who combine the pragmatic and results-oriented methods of a business entrepreneur with the goal of social change.

Jolin has also served as the chief of staff for President Clinton's Council of Economic Advisers, where she worked for both Nobel Prize-winning economist Joseph Stiglitz and Janet Yellen, former Chair of the Board of Governors of the Federal Reserve System. She has also worked for Senator Boxer on the Senate Banking, Housing and Urban Affairs Committee.
