= Fanny Falkner =

Swedish actress and miniaturist (1890–1963)

Fanny Johanna Maria Falkner
- Fanny Falkner in the title role in Svanevit at Intima Teatern 1909.
- Born: 1890; Karlshamn, Sweden
- Died: 1963 (aged 72–73); Copenhagen, Denmark
- Occupations: actress, miniaturist

Fanny Johanna Maria Falkner (1890 - 1963) was a Swedish actress and miniaturist.

== Background ==
Falkner grew up in Stockholm, where she studied at the Technical School in Stockholm. In 1907, she went to Copenhagen to study painting. Upon her return to Stockholm, she met Manda Björling, who arranged walk-ons and small rôles for her at Strindberg's Intimate Theatre. She attracted the attention of Strindberg, who considered her rôle of Eleonora in the play Easter.

She did not get the part, but the contact between Falkner and Strindberg resulted in his renting part of her parents' apartment on Drottninggatan, Blå tornet. Falkner was engaged at the Intimate Theatre for some years, moving back to Copenhagen when rumors of marriage between her and Strindberg came into circulation. As an artist, she drew the program covers for Strindberg's Abu Casem's Slippers and The Great Highway (1908–09).

She was the daughter of Frans Nilsson Falkner and Anna Meta Hansen and cousin of artist Tage Falkner.
