= Ellen Jolin =

Swedish artist (1854–1939)

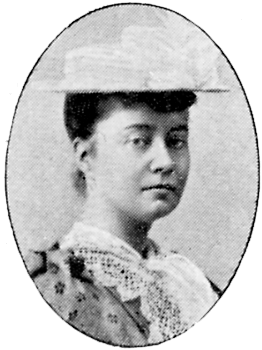
- Born: Maria Helena Jolin; 16 June 1854; Stockholm, Sweden
- Died: 25 May 1939 (aged 84); Stockholm, Sweden
- Known for: Painting

(Maria Helena) Ellen Jolin (16 June 1854 – 25 May 1939) was a Swedish writer, painter and graphic artist.

== Biography ==
Jolin was born in Stockholm, Sweden. She attended the Royal Swedish Academy of Fine Arts in Stockholm and the Académie Julian in Paris. Her instructors included Fredrik Wilhelm Scholander, Kerstin Cardon, Carl Hansen, and Jules Joseph Lefebvre.

Jolin exhibited her paintings in Paris, Vienna, and Berlin. In 1893 she exhibited her work at the Palace of Fine Arts at the World's Columbian Exposition in Chicago, Illinois.

She was the aunt of the painter Einar Jolin (1890-1976). Jolin died in 1939 and was buried at Solna Cemetery in Stockholm.
