= Global Citizen Year =

Non-profit organization based in San Francisco

- Abbreviation: GCY
- Formation: 2009; 17 years ago
- Founder: Abby Falik
- Tax ID no.: 26-3161342
- Legal status: 501(c)(3) non-profit organization
- Headquarters: Oakland, California, United States
- CEO: Erin Lewellen
- Revenue: $21,412,648 (2022)
- Website: www.globalcitizenyear.org

Global Citizen Year (renamed Tilting Futures in 2024) is a non-profit organization based in Oakland which runs several programs that aim to help young people develop intellectual and emotional skills pertaining to empathy, cross-cultural communication and connection, personal agency, and the addressing of global issues.

The organization was founded by Harvard Business School graduate Abby Falik in 2009, based on a pitch she presented and won first place for in the 2008 Pitch for Change. Since 2010, the organization has had over 2700 graduates from over 100 countries.

== Activities and recognition ==
Global Citizen Year launched its pilot program in the 2009-10 academic year, as part of which U.S. and United World College students who had finished high school and not yet enrolled in college could participate in the organization's intensive service learning and leadership program. The program provided training and mentorship through individualized apprenticeships with Global Citizen Year field staff and local partners in countries that varied each semester. The organization, partnering with colleges such as Tufts University and Claremont McKenna, hosted its programs in several countries, including (but not limited to) Brazil, Ecuador, India, and Senegal.

Due to the global lockdowns that were implemented during the COVID-19 pandemic, Global Citizen Year launched an online gap year program called Global Citizen Year Academy. The program was designed in partnership with Minerva Project and offered online courses accredited through Minerva Schools at KGI. These courses aimed to help students develop college study and career skills through a mix of academic and experiential learning, collaboration with international peers, and workshops led by professionals working in business, philanthropy, government, and social change. As part of a diversity and equity initiative, Global Citizen Year partnered with the Shawn Mendes Foundation to provide $250,000 in financial aid to students of the program.

In 2023, Global Citizen Year launched their 12-week program Take Action Lab (TAL). Students in the program complete a four-week virtual curriculum before living with a global cohort and learning how to create meaningful impact on human rights while apprenticing at non-governmental organizations in Cape Town, South Africa.

=== Recognition ===
In 2018, Outside named Global Citizen Year one of the best places to work in the United States. At the 2019 Builders + Innovators Summit, founder and then-CEO Abby Falik was named one of the 100 most intriguing entrepreneurs by Goldman Sachs for the third consecutive year. In 2023, the Gap Year Association awarded Global Citizen Year with the Karl Haigler Excellence in Research Award for their research on the positive impact the Academy had on its participants in a variety of competencies related to success in careers, further education, and life.

== Vision and goals ==
Global Citizen Year allocated a $50 Million New Leaders Fund towards its five-year mission, which aims to:

- Involve 10,000 new students in their gap year program;
- Supply grants and scholarships to people from low-income backgrounds and people of colour, to address the under-representation of these demographics in leadership positions;
- Create an alumni network that makes a significant impact on society;
- Promote modes of leadership that prioritise addressing social and environmental concerns over personal gain.
