= 1893 in literature =

This article contains information about the literary events and publications of 1893.

== Events ==
Act IV: Mrs Arbuthnot strikes Lord Illingworth in A Woman of No Importance

- January 14 – Kate Chopin's short stories "Désirée's Baby" and "A Visit to Avoyelles" appear in Vogue magazine in the United States.
- February/March – The 22-year-old Stephen Crane pays for publication of his first book, the Bowery novella Maggie: A Girl of the Streets, under the pseudonym "Johnston Smith", in New York City. Later considered a pioneering example of American literary realism, its first trade edition (rewritten) comes out in 1896 after Crane has attained fame with The Red Badge of Courage.
- April 19 – Oscar Wilde's social comedy A Woman of No Importance receives its first performance at the Haymarket Theatre, London, with Herbert Beerbohm Tree, Mrs. Bernard Beere and Julia Neilson.
- May 2 – Swedish dramatist August Strindberg, 44, begins a brief marriage with Austrian writer Frida Uhl, 21.
- May 17 – Maurice Maeterlinck's symbolist play Pelléas and Mélisande is first performed.
- May 27 – Arthur Wing Pinero's problem play The Second Mrs Tanqueray is first performed, at the St. James Theatre, London, with Mrs. Patrick Campbell in the title rôle.
- June 14 – The Shelley Memorial is inaugurated at University College, Oxford, from which the poet was expelled in 1811. It is designed by Basil Champneys, with a reclining nude marble statue of Percy Bysshe Shelley by Edward Onslow Ford.
- July – Bangiya Sahitya Parishad is established as "The Bengal Academy of Literature".
- July 1 – The first issue of L'Ère Nouvelle is published in Paris by the Romanian George Diamandy. It will have contributions from Marxist theoreticians, including Friedrich Engels, Paul Lafargue, Constantin Dobrogeanu-Gherea, Georgi Plekhanov, and Georges Sorel. In literature, L'Ère Nouvelle promotes a blend of naturalism as embodied by Émile Zola and historical materialism.
- October – André Gide begins his travels in North Africa, where he comes to accept his homosexuality.
- October 7 – Finley Peter Dunne introduces the fictional character Mr. Dooley in the Chicago Evening Post.
- November 11 – Jerome K. Jerome founds To-Day, "A weekly magazine-journal", in London.
- November 26 – Arthur Conan Doyle surprises the reading public by revealing in the story "The Adventure of the Final Problem", published in The Strand Magazine dated December, that his private detective character Sherlock Holmes had apparently died at the Reichenbach Falls on 4 May 1891. Doyle has stayed in Switzerland for a time this year.
- November 28 – The Raimund Theater opens in Vienna, Austria.
- December – W. B. Yeats publishes The Celtic Twilight, giving a popular name to the Irish Literary Revival.
- December 16 – Establishment, in Yorkshire (England), of the Brontë Society, possibly the oldest literary society of this nature, dedicated to establishing what will become the Brontë Parsonage Museum.
- December 20 – The first story featuring the private detective character Sexton Blake, "The Missing Millionaire", appears in Alfred Harmsworth's new boys' story paper The Halfpenny Marvel (London), written by Harry Blyth under the pen-name Hal Meredeth.

== New books ==
=== Fiction ===
- E. F. Benson – Dodo
- Mary Elizabeth Braddon – The Venetians
- Byron A. Brooks – Earth Revisited
- Rhoda Broughton – A Beginner
- Hall Caine
  - Cap'n Davey's Honeymoon (novella)
  - The Last Confession (novella)
  - The Blind Mother (novella)
- Anton Chekhov – "The Story of an Unknown Man"
- Mary Cholmondeley – Diana Tempest
- Marie Corelli – Barabbas
- Stephen Crane – Maggie: A Girl of the Streets
- Walter Crane – Columbia's Courtship
- Arthur Conan Doyle – The Refugees
- 'George Egerton' (Mary Dunne) – Keynotes (short stories)
- Edith Escombe – A Tale that is Told
- Mary E. Wilkins Freeman – Jane Field
- André Gide
  - La tentative amoureuse
  - Le voyage d'Urien
- George Gissing – The Odd Women
- Sarah Grand – The Heavenly Twins
- H. Rider Haggard – Montezuma's Daughter
- Beatrice Harraden – Ships That Pass in the Night
- "Two Women of the West" (Alice Ilgenfritz Jones and Ella Merchant) – Unveiling a Parallel
- Josef Svatopluk Machar – Magdalena
- Henry Olerich – A Cityless and Countryless World
- Bolesław Prus – The New Woman (Emancypantki; serialization completed)
- Addison Peale Russell – Sub-Coelum
- Flora Annie Steel
  - From the Five Rivers (short stories)
  - Miss Stuart's Legacy
- August Strindberg – The Defence of a Fool (Le Plaidoyer d'un fou)
- Jules Verne
  - Claudius Bombarnac
  - Foundling Mick (P'tit-Bonhomme)
- Lew Wallace – The Prince of India or Why Constantinople Fell
- Stanley J. Weyman – A Gentleman of France
- Émile Zola – Le Docteur Pascal

=== Children and young people ===
- Margaret Marshall Saunders – Beautiful Joe
- Robert Louis Stevenson
  - Catriona
  - Island Nights' Entertainments (three stories)

=== Drama ===
- Rosario de Acuña – La voz de la patria (Pregnant Woman)
- Alexandre Bisson and Albert Carré – Le Veglione (le Bal masqué)
- H. Grattan Donnelly and Sidney R. Ellis – Darkest Russia
- Gerhart Hauptmann
  - The Beaver Coat (Der Biberpelz)
  - The Assumption of Hannele (Hanneles Himmelfahrt)
- Herman Heijermans – Dora Kremer
- Maurice Maeterlinck – Pelléas et Mélisande
- George Moore – The Strike at Arlingford
- Arthur Wing Pinero – The Second Mrs Tanqueray
- Arthur Schnitzler – Anatol (published)
- George Bernard Shaw – Mrs. Warren's Profession (written)
- Oscar Wilde
  - Salome (first published, in French)
  - A Woman of No Importance

=== Poetry ===
- Gabriele D'Annunzio – Odi Navali
- Maryana Marrash – Bint fikr
- Alice Meynell – Poems
- Eric Stenbock – The Shadow of Death: poems, songs, and sonnets
- Francis Thompson – Poems, including "The Hound of Heaven"

=== Non-fiction ===
- Hart's Rules for Compositors and Readers at the University Press, Oxford (1st edition)
- Henry James – Essays in London and Elsewhere
- George Panu – Portrete și tipuri parlamentare (Parliamentary Portraits and Types)
- Alois Riegl – Stilfragen: Grundlegungen zu einer Geschichte der Ornamentik
- William Wynn Westcott – Collectanea Hermetica (start of publication)

== Births ==
- January 3
  - W. N. Hodgson (Edward Melbourne), English war poet (killed in action 1916)
  - Pierre Drieu La Rochelle, French novelist (died 1945)
- January 10 – Vicente Huidobro, Chilean Creacionismo poet and editor (died 1948)
- January 12 – Maria Jolas, born Maria McDonald, American-born French literary publisher (died 1987)
- January 13 – Clark Ashton Smith, American poet and short-story writer (died 1961)
- February 11 – Nan Shepherd, Scottish novelist and poet (died 1981)
- February 26 – Dorothy Whipple, English writer of fiction and children's books (died 1966)
- March 11 – Wanda Gág, American children's author and artist (died 1946)
- March 18 – Wilfred Owen, English war poet (killed in action 1918)
- April 9
  - Victor Gollancz, English publisher (died 1967)
  - Mahapandit Rahul Sankrityayan, Indian historian, writer, scholar (died 1963)
- April 16 – Germaine Guèvremont, Canadian journalist and author (died 1968)
- May 6 – Margaret Cole (Margaret Postgate), English political writer, biographer and activist (died 1980)
- May 14 – Louis Verneuil, born Louis Jacques Marie Collin du Bocage, French playwright (suicide 1952)
- May 19 – H. Bonciu, Romanian novelist, poet and translator (died 1950)
- June 13 – Dorothy L. Sayers, English writer of detective fiction and translator (died 1957)
- July 3 – Luca Caragiale, Romanian poet, novelist and translator (died 1921)
- July 5 – Anthony Berkeley Cox, English crime writer (died 1971)
- July 19 – Vladimir Mayakovsky, Russian and Soviet poet and playwright (suicide 1930)
- July 21 – Hans Fallada (Rudolf Wilhelm Friedrich Ditzen), German novelist (died 1947)
- August 1 – Mihail Celarianu, Romanian poet and novelist (died 1985)
- August 14 – Francis Dvornik, Czech historian (died 1975)
- August 22 – Dorothy Parker, American poet, journalist and wit (died 1967)
- September 18
  - William March, American writer and soldier (died 1954)
  - Reidar Rye Haugan, American newspaper editor and publisher (died 1972)
- September 28 – Giannis Skarimpas, Greek writer, dramatist, and poet (died 1984)
- October 9 – Mário de Andrade, Brazilian writer and photographer (died 1945)
- October 14
  - May Wedderburn Cannan, English poet (died 1973)
  - Lois Lenski, American author and illustrator (died 1974)
- October 15 – Saunders Lewis, English-born Welsh poet, dramatist and critic (died 1985)
- October 16 – Harry Donenfeld, American pulp fiction publisher (died 1965)
- October 26 – Miloš Crnjanski, Serbian poet and novelist (died 1977)
- November 10 – John P. Marquand, American novelist (died 1960)
- November 14 – Carlo Emilio Gadda, Italian author (died 1973)
- December 6 – Sylvia Townsend Warner, English novelist and poet (died 1978)
- December 29 – Vera Brittain, English memoirist, novelist, feminist and pacifist (died 1970)
- Unknown date – Samuel Roth, Galician-born American writer and publisher (died 1974)

== Deaths ==
- January 7 – Jožef Stefan, Slovenian physicist, mathematician and poet (born 1835)
- January 15 – Fanny Kemble, English actress (born 1809)
- January 22 – Kawatake Mokuami (河竹黙阿弥), Japanese dramatist (born 1816)
- January 23 – José Zorrilla, Spanish dramatist and poet (born 1817)
- February 10
  - Henry Churchill de Mille, American playwright (born 1853)
  - Alphonse Jolly, French dramatist and librarian (born 1810)
- February 13 – Ignacio Manuel Altamirano, first modern Mexican novelist (Clemencia) and (El Zarco) (born 1834)
- April 6 – Charlotte Anley, English didactic novelist and religious writer (born 1796)
- April 17 – Lucy Larcom, American teacher and author (born 1824)
- April 19 – John Addington Symonds, English poet and essayist (born 1840)
- May 10 – Julius Dresser, American writer of the "New Thought" movement (born 1838)
- June 11 – H. B. Goodwin, American novelist, poet and educator (born 1827)
- June 14 – Jakob Frohschammer, German theologian and philosopher (born 1821)
- July 6 – Guy de Maupassant, French novelist and short story writer (born 1850)
- August 12 – Edward Bruce Hamley, English military writer, general and politician (born 1824)
- August 31 – Lucy Hamilton Hooper, American poet, journalist, editor, playwright, and translator (born 1835)
- September 4 – Francis Adams, Maltese-born English political writer, poet and novelist (born 1862)
- October 7 – William Smith, English lexicographer (born 1813)
- November 12 – Jemima von Tautphoeus, English-born novelist (born 1807)
- December 2 – Charlotte Maria Tucker, English children's writer (born 1821)
- December 25
  - Ivan Broz, Croatian linguist and literary historian (born 1852)
  - Emily Sarah Holt, English novelist (born 1836)

== Awards ==
- Newdigate Prize - John Burland Harris-Burland
