= Olerich =

Olerich is a surname. Notable people with the surname include:

- Dave Olerich (born 1944), American football player
- Henry Olerich (1851–1927), American writer
