= Heavenly Twins (disambiguation) =

The Heavenly Twins are Castor and Pollux, twin half-brothers in Greek and Roman mythology, who became the two brightest stars in the constellation Gemini.

Heavenly Twins may also refer to:

- Heavenly Twins (Sumner and Cunliffe), two British diplomats (Lord Sumner and Lord Cunliffe) during the 1919 Treaty of Versailles negotiations
- Heavenly Twins (Montana), a double mountain summit in the United States
- The Heavenly Twins, an 1893 novel by Sarah Grand
- Les Pavés du Ciel, English title The Heavenly Twins, a 1953 play by Albert Husson
