= Haldane MacFall =

British Army officer, art critic (1860–1926)

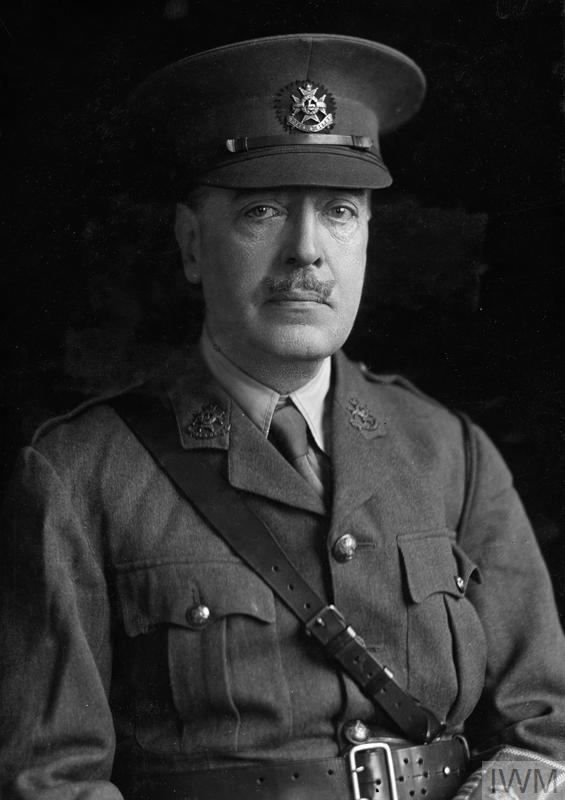
- Major Haldane MacFall c.1917 (IWM)
- Born: Chambers Haldane Cooke McFall; 24 July 1860; Bengal, India
- Died: 25 July 1928 (aged 68); London
- Resting place: Highgate Cemetery
- Occupations: Military officer, art critic, novelist, essayist and artist.

Haldane MacFall (24 July 1860 – 25 July 1928) was a British Army officer who became an authoritative art critic, the author of several works of art history, an essayist and a novelist. He illustrated many of his own works, as well as bookplates and cover art for others, and exhibited at the Royal Academy.

== Early life ==
Chambers Haldane Cooke MacFall was born in Roy Bareilli, Bengal, (now Raebareli, Uttar Pradesh), India on 24 July 1860. His father, David Chambers McFall (1833–1898) was an army surgeon attached to the Indian border regiment. His mother, Abigail Crawford, died while Haldane and his younger brother Albert William Crawford McFall (1862–1923) were young children. The family returned to England in the late 1860s and in 1870 Haldane's father remarried a sixteen year old, Frances Elizabeth Bellenden Clarke, later to become a successful novelist under the pseudonym Sarah Grand. Like his father and grandfather Thomas, Haldane chose a career in the army and undertook officer training at the Royal Military College, Sandhurst.

== Career ==
He graduated from Sandhurst as a Second Lieutenant and in 1885 joined the West India Regiment in Jamaica. After service in the West Indies he fought with the Regiment in the West Africa campaign, which was where he began his literary and artistic career, writing about his experiences for The Graphic and also contributing illustrations to the magazine. However, a tropical disease he contracted during his posting in West Africa forced his retirement from the army in 1890 with the rank of Lieutenant. Wishing to pursue his interest in art, he lived in Paris in the early 1890s, before returning to England to earn his livelihood mainly as a writer.

In 1898, he moved in with his stepmother, Sarah Grand, who was then living in Tunbridge Wells. She had left Haldane's father, and their son David, in 1890, after an unhappy marriage and was successfully pursuing her own writing career. Haldane set his first novel The Wooings of Jezebel Pettyfer in Jamaica and, unusually for the time, it had a West Indian hero. It was published the year he moved into Sarah's house. His next novel, The Masterfolk, was a witty portrait of bohemian life in London and Paris in the 1890s. Published in 1903, it was also the year he married Mabel Anne Plumridge (1861–1931), daughter of Admiral Sir James Hanway Plumridge and his third wife Georgina Skinner, whose brother was another army officer, Thomas Skinner. He continued to write for periodicals, combining his interest in art with critiques of exhibitions; writings which are said to have drawn the attention of Whistler. But it was his books on art, particularly his biographies of artists which became his primary source of income. Between 1903 and 1909 he wrote biographies of Henrik Ibsen, Whistler, Henry Irving, François Boucher, Jean-Honoré Fragonard and Élisabeth Vigée Le Brun, as well as several histories of art movements, numerous illustrations and book covers. During this period Haldane also collaborated with several artists, including Henri Gaudier-Brzeska, who sculpted his bust and Claud Lovat Fraser, who with Edward Gordon Craig, provided illustrations for his essay on art and aesthetics, The Splendid Wayfaring (1913). He was fluent in French.

== Later life ==
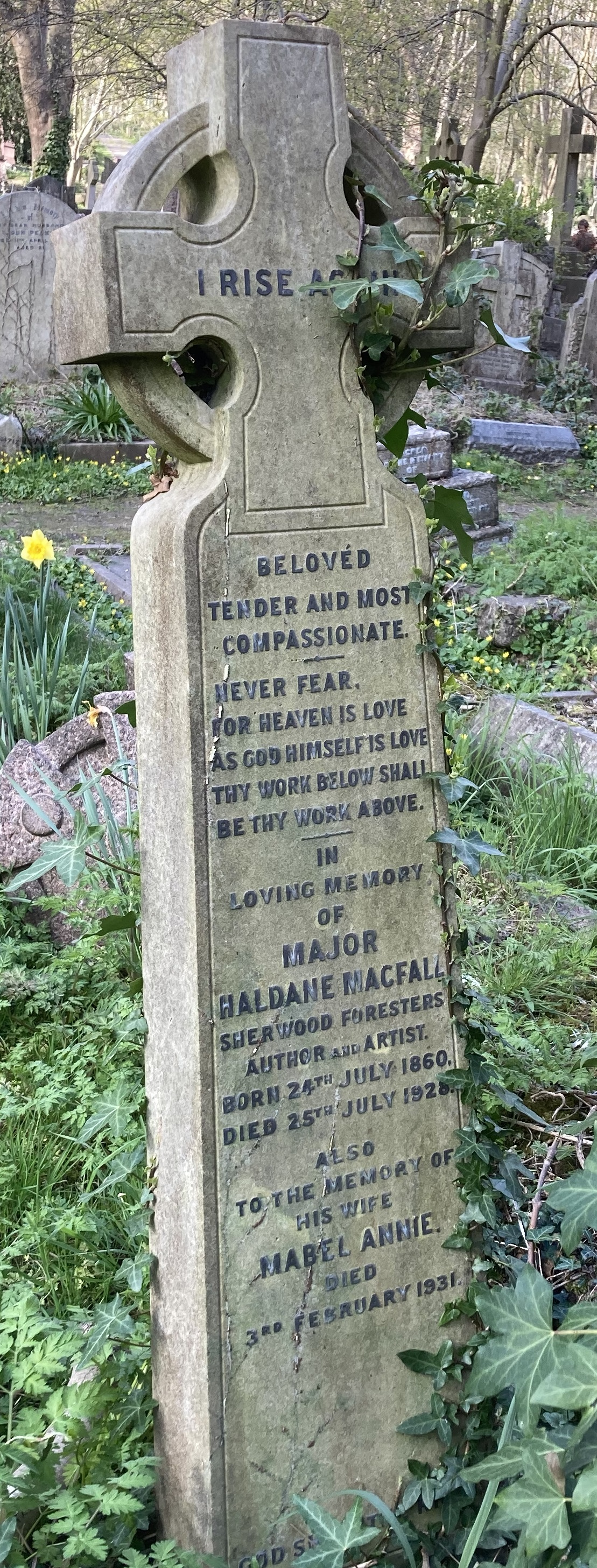
Grave of Haldane Macfall in Highgate Cemetery

He was 54 years old at the outbreak of the Great War in 1914, but he returned to the army and, although he was not sent to the front, he proved to be an efficient officer and was promoted rapidly to end the war with the rank of Major. Throughout the War he continued to write, publishing several books and essays on military topics.

His final work was a spirited defence of his friend Aubrey Beardsley, published in 1928, the year of his death.

He is buried with his wife Mabel on the eastern side of Highgate Cemetery.

== Novels ==
- The Wooings of Jezebel Pettyfer (1898)
- The Masterfolk (1903)
- Rouge (1906)
- The Three Students (1926)
