= Sylva Macharová =

- 1927
- Born: 23 June 1893; Vienna, Austro-Hungarian Empire
- Died: 19 January 1968 (aged 74); Czechoslovakia
- Occupation: nurse
- Years active: 1915–1957
- Known for: Developing nursing programs in Prague
- Spouse: Alfons Nováček

Sylva Macharová (23 June 1893 – 19 January 1968) was a Czech nurse who was one of the first trained nurses in Prague. She headed the first nursing school in the country between 1923 and 1931. She was one of the inaugural recipients of the Florence Nightingale Medal. After a break to raise her family, Macharová returned to nursing after World War II, working at a military hospital until 1949. Thereafter, she was appointed Head of the Rehabilitation Department in the clinic headed by Professor Arnold Jirásek.

== Early life ==
Sylva Macharová was born on 23 June 1893 in Vienna, which was part of the Austro-Hungarian Empire at that time. Her father was the Czech poet Josef Svatopluk Machar, who at the time of her birth was working as a bank clerk. After attending the Lyceum in Hradec Králové for her secondary schooling, Macharová enrolled in 1913 in the Rudolfinerhaus Hospital School of Nursing in Vienna. She graduated in 1915 and went to Prague, becoming one of the first licensed nurses of the city.

== Career ==
Macharová, who spoke Czech, English, and German, began working in a sanatorium in Podolí. Soon thereafter, she became a scrub nurse in the clinic of Professor Otakar Kukula. Around 1918, Macharová went to Zlín at the request of Tomáš Baťa, founder of Baťa Shoes, who was the mayor of Zlín at that time. He wanted her to investigate why he had cases of wound suppuration and she was able to discover the cause. In 1920, the International Committee of the Red Cross awarded the Florence Nightingale Medal for the first time, and Macharová was one of two Czech recipients, the other being Irene Metekickova. The award was designed to recognize those who exhibited exemplary performance of nursing duties.

In 1923, Macharová became the first headmistress of the Czech School of Nursing, taking over from the three American Red Cross nurses who had initially developed the theoretical and practical training for the school. Simultaneously, she became the director of the German School of Nursing in the city. During her tenure, the school expanded rapidly, but maintained its dedication to professionalism. Macharová developed internship opportunities and workshops to improve skill and she sought to integrate languages in both schools.

In 1931, Macharová married Alfons Nováček, a veterinarian. They moved to Moravské Budějovice, where Macharová raised two sons, until 1938. At that time, the family returned to Prague because Marcharová's father was ill. In 1946, she returned to nursing, working at the Central Military Hospital. She worked in the neurosurgery unit until 1949, when for political reasons she was forced to resign. That same year, she was hired as the head of the rehabilitation department in the university clinic headed by Professor Arnold Jirásek, where she worked until her retirement in 1957.

Macharová died after a lengthy bout with cancer on 19 January 1968.
