= The Defence of a Fool =

1893 novel by August Strindberg

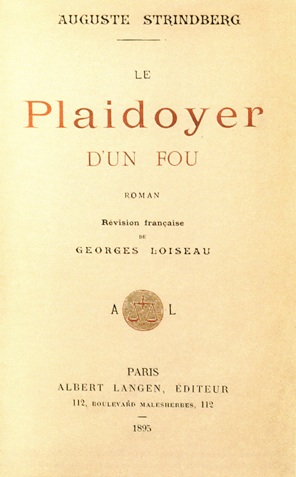
- First French edition title page
- Author: August Strindberg
- Original title: Le Plaidoyer d'un Fou
- Translator: Ellie Schleussner (English-language edition)
- Language: French
- Publisher: Albert Langen (French edition)
- Publication date: 1893 (German edition); 1895 (French edition)
- Publication place: France
- English publication date: 1912
- Pages: 336

The Defence of a Fool (French: Le Plaidoyer d'un fou) is an autobiographical novel by the Swedish writer August Strindberg. The narrative is a lightly fictionalized account of his life from 1874 to 1887, and especially of his first marriage to Siri von Essen (called Maria in the novel). The book was written in French in 1887–1888. It was first published in a German translation in 1893, and then in French as Le Plaidoyer d’un Fou in 1895. However, the French editor had made radical alterations to Strindberg's text — how radical was not discovered until 1973, when the original manuscript, which had been considered lost, came to light. It was discovered in a safe in Oslo among papers belonging to Strindberg's friend, the Norwegian painter Edvard Munch. Based on it a new Swedish translation appeared in 1976. It has also been published in English as The Confession of a Fool, A Madman's Defence, A Fool's Apology and A Madman's Manifesto.

== Writing process ==
As his stormy marriage to Siri von Essen was coming to an end, August Strindberg feared there was a secret conspiracy between the women of Europe, and they were planning to silence him by conducting a campaign to make people believe he was insane. Strindberg therefore decided to hurriedly write a book revealing the truths about the marriage. He began to write The Defence of a Fool in the autumn 1887 and it was finished the following spring. It was written in French.

== Publication ==
The book was first published in 1893 through Bibliographisches Bureau, in a German translation, with the title Die Beichte eines Toren. Because of this version Strindberg was prosecuted on obscenity charges a year later in Berlin, but he was eventually acquitted. The Swedish magazine Budkaflen pirated a Swedish translation from the German edition, publishing the novel in instalments between 1893 and 1894, despite the writer's protests. The original French version was published by Albert Langen in 1895. The first English translation was called The Confession of a Fool and published in 1912 (translated by Ellie Schleussner d.1944); in his book The Novels of August Strindberg, Strindberg researcher Eric O. Johannesson describes it as "a poor translation from Schering's 1910 German version which gives a totally misleading impression of the nature of the book". The first Swedish edition (translated by John Landquist) was published in 1914, after Strindberg's death, as En dåres försvarstal.

== See also ==
- 1893 in literature
- Swedish literature
