= Sarah Grand =

English feminist writer (1854–1943)

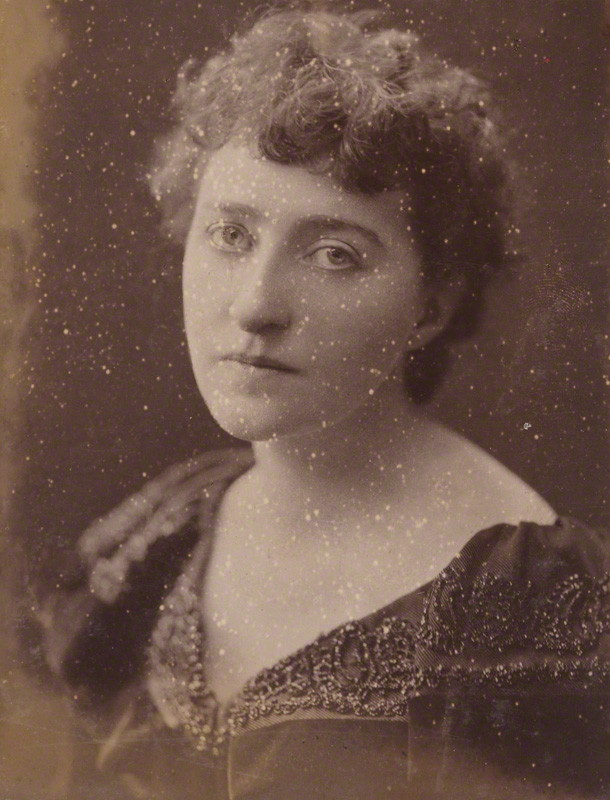
- Sarah Grand, 1894, by H.S. Mendelssohn
- Born: Frances Elizabeth Bellenden Clarke; 10 June 1854; Rosebank House, Donaghadee, County Down, Ireland
- Died: 12 May 1943 (aged 88); Calne, Wiltshire, England, UK
- Spouse(s): David Chambers McFall (m. 1870–1898; his death)
- Children: 1
- Writing career
- Pen name: Sarah Grand
- Years active: 1873–1922
- Genres: Fiction, treatises
- Subject: Feminism (New Woman ideal)
- Notable work: The Heavenly Twins

Signature
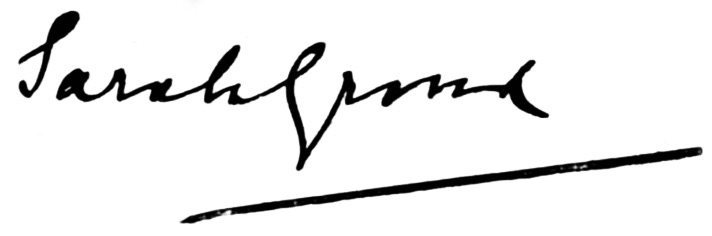

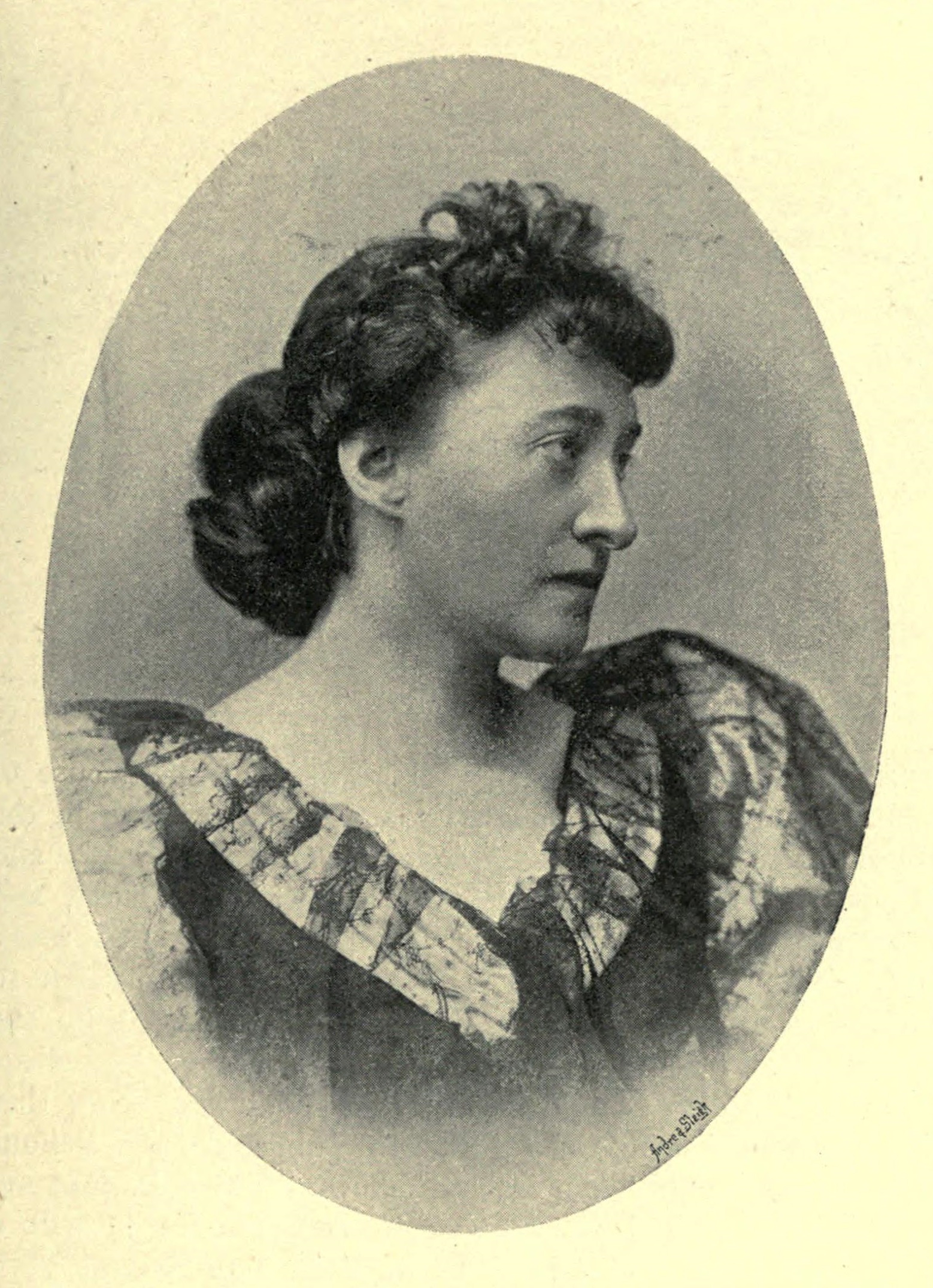
Sarah Grand, 1895, by Elliot & Fry

Sarah Grand (10 June 1854 – 12 May 1943) was an Irish-English feminist writer active from 1873 to 1922. Her work revolved around the New Woman ideal.

== Early life and influences ==
Sarah Grand was born Frances Elizabeth Bellenden Clarke in Rosebank House, Donaghadee, County Down, Ireland, of English parents. Her father was Edward John Bellenden Clarke (1813–1862) and her mother was Margaret Bell Sherwood (1813–1874). When her father died, her mother took her five children to Yorkshire, England. They lived in Bridlington, to be near the Bell Sherwood family who lived at Rysome Garth near Holmpton in the East Riding of Yorkshire.

Grand's education was very sporadic, yet she managed with perseverance to make a career for herself as an activist and writer, drawing on her travels and life experiences.

In 1868 Grand was sent to the Royal Naval School, Twickenham, but was soon expelled for organizing groups that supported Josephine Butler's protests against the Contagious Diseases Act, which persecuted prostitutes as infected women, as the sole cause of the spread of sexually transmitted diseases, subjecting them to indignities such as inspection of their genitals and enclosure in locked hospital wards.

Grand was then sent to a finishing school in Kensington, London.

In August 1870, at the age of sixteen, she married widowed Army surgeon David Chambers McFall. He was 23 years her senior and had two sons from his previous marriage: Chambers Haldane Cooke McFall and Albert William Crawford McFall. Grand and McFall's only child, David Archibald Edward McFall, was born in Sandgate, Kent, on 7 October 1871. He became an actor and took the name Archie Carlow Grand.

From 1873 to 1878 the family travelled in the Far East, providing Grand with more material for her fiction. In 1879 they moved to Norwich, and in 1881 to Warrington, Lancashire where her husband retired.

Upon returning to England, it has been suggested that Grand felt constrained by her marriage, with writer Stephanie Forward suggesting that Grande was “increasingly disgusted by her husband’s sexual advance, and by coarse aspects of his behaviour generally". She turned to writing, but her first novel, Ideala, self-published in 1888, enjoyed limited success and some negative reviews. George Gissing who read the novel in April 1889 wrote in his diary that he found it 'on the whole an interesting book but crude in parts and without much style'. Nevertheless, she trusted in her new career to support her in her decision to leave her husband in 1890 and move to London. Recently enacted laws that allowed women to retain their personal property after marriage were an encouraging factor in her decision.

She used her experience of suffocation in marriage and the joy of consequent liberation in her fictional depictions of pre-suffrage women with few political rights and options, trapped in oppressive marriages. Later works would have a more sympathetic stance to males, such as Babs the Impossible in which the single noble women would feel resurgence in their worth encouraged by an idealistic self-made man.

Through her husband's work as an army surgeon, Grand learned of the anatomical physiology of the nature of sexually transmitted diseases. She used this knowledge in her 1893 novel The Heavenly Twins, warning of the dangers of syphilis, advocating sensitivity rather than condemnation for the young women infected with this disease.

== Rebirth as Sarah Grand and her later life and death ==
Clarke renamed herself Sarah Grand in 1893 with the publication by Heinemann of her novel The Heavenly Twins. This feminine pen name represented the archetype of the "New Woman" developed by her and her female colleagues. Grand established the phrase "New Woman" in a debate with Ouida in 1894.

She lived briefly in London, then, after her husband's sudden death in February 1898, moved to Tunbridge Wells, Kent, where her stepson writer and illustrator, Haldane MacFall came to lodge for several years with her. During her stay in Tunbridge Wells she took an active part in the local women's suffrage societies, as well as travelling extensively, particularly to the United States on a lecture tour in the wake of the notoriety of her novel The Heavenly Twins. Although it gained her mixed and often angry criticism, her work was well received by notable authors as George Bernard Shaw. In 1920 she moved to Crowe Hall at Widcombe in Bath, Somerset where she served from 1922 to 1929 as Mayoress alongside Mayor Cedric Chivers. When her home was bombed in 1942, Grand was persuaded to move to Calne in Wiltshire, where she died the following year on 12 May 1943, at age 88. She is buried in Lansdown Cemetery, Bath, Somerset, alongside her sister, Nellie. Her son Archie outlived her by only a year, dying in a London air raid in 1944.

== Writing ==
Her work dealt with the New Woman in fiction and also in fact; Grand wrote treatises on the subject of the failures of many marriages. Grand holds out the hope of marriage as the holiest and perfect state of union between a man and woman, but deplores the inequality and disadvantages intended to keep young women ignorant, and insists that women should rebel against entrapment in a loveless marriage.

The New Woman novel was a development of the late 19th century. New Woman novelists and characters encouraged and supported several types of political action in Britain. For some women, the New Woman movement provided support for women who wanted to work and learn for themselves, and who started to question the inequality of women and sometimes even the idea of marriage. For other women, especially Sarah Grand, the New Woman movement allowed women to speak out not only about the inequality of women, but about middle-class women's responsibilities to the nation. In The Heavenly Twins Grand demonstrates the dangers of the moral double standard which overlooked men's promiscuity while punishing women for the same acts. However, another central message of the work is that in order for the British nation to grow stronger, middle-class women must choose mates with whom they might produce strong, well-educated children.

== Criticism ==
The Berg Collection of the New York Public Library keeps Mark Twain's copy of The Heavenly Twins. Twain filled the margins of the book with increasingly critical comments, writing after one chapter, "A cat could do better literature than this."

== Works ==
- Two Dear Little Feet, 1873
- Ideala, 1888
- A Domestic Experiment, 1891
- The Heavenly Twins, 1893
- Our Manifold Nature, 1894
- The Beth Book, 1897
- Babs the Impossible,1901
- Adnam's Orchard, 1912
- The Winged Victory, 1916
- Variety, 1922
