= John Burland Harris-Burland =

UK author (1870–1926)

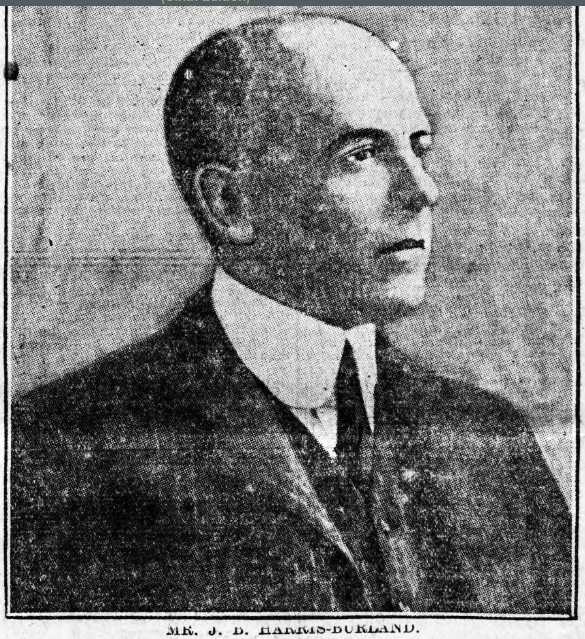

John Burland Harris-Burland (1870-1926) was a British writer, known for his early fantasy stories.

He was born on 1 November 1870 at Aldershot, Hampshire, son of Major General William Burland Harris-Burland (1835-1890), decorated for his part in the Crimean War, and Eleanor Harding Bennitt (1841-1897). His siblings were William Malcom Harris-Burland (1873-1956), an electrical and mechanical engineer, and Ione Mary Harris-Burland (1879-1959) who married the journalist and author Francis (Frank) William Henry Giolma (1878-1968) and lived at James Bay, Victoria, British Columbia.

He attended F. Brackenbury's Prep School, and from 1884 to 1888 he was a pupil at Sherborne School where he held two scholarships, was secretary of the Debating Society, and won the Fifth Form Competition Prize for Latin Elegiacs (1886) and the Plumptre Prize for Mathematics (1886 & 1888).

Due to his health (as a child he contracted rheumatic fever and whooping cough) he was unable to enter a military career like his father, and studied for two years at theological college with the intention of joining the Church. Despite winning a theological scholarship at Durham University he decided to go to Exeter College, where he matriculated on 18 October 1892.

In 1893 he won the Newdigate Prize for English Verse at Oxford University with his poem "Amy Robsart", about the first wife of Robert Dudley, earl of Leicester. While at Oxford he edited the "Isis" magazine and in 1894 was Honorary Secretary of the Oxford Union.

After leaving Oxford he went on the stage for a year before becoming a secretary of public companies, later using the financial knowledge he acquired in his novel "The Financier."

In 1902 his first novel "Dacobra" appeared serially in England, America, and Australia, and was published in 1903 by R.A. Everett & Co. Its success led to him becoming a writer.

In 1906 he was married at Clacton-on-Sea to Florence Caroline Gough, daughter of the late Albert Marley. They lived at The Lyons Close, Pevensey, Sussex, and at Holly Tree Cottage, Stanton, Broadway, Worcestershire.

He died on 22 July 1926 at The Lyons Close, Pevensey, Sussex, aged 55. His wife Florence died on 27 January 1951.

== Bibliography ==
- Dacobra, or the White Priests of Ahriman (1903)
- Princess Thora (1904), re-released in 1905 in Britain as Dr. Silex
- The Black Motor-Car (1906)
- The Broken Law (1906)
- The Financier (1906)
- The Gold Worshippers (1907)
- Love, the Criminal (1907)
- Workers in Darkness (1908)
- The House of the Soul (1909)
- The Disc (1909)
- The Secret of Enoch Seal (1910)
- The Torhaven Mystery (1910)
- Sunk Island (1910)
- The Shadow of Malreward (1911)
- Lord of Irongrey (1912)
- Life's Golden Web (1912)
- The Grey Cat (1913)
- A Mayfair Mystery (1913)
- The Curse of Cloud (1914)
- Baldragon (1914)
- The White Rook (1917)
- Gabrielle Janhry (1919)
- The Golden Sword (1919)
- Greed of Conquest (1919)
- The Spy (1919)
- The White Yawl (1919)
- The Builder (1919)
- The Avalanche (1919)
- The Lion's Claws (1919)
- The Watchman (1919)
- Temple of Lies (1919)
- The Dark Inheritance (1926)
- The Tower of Silence (published posthumously 1927)
- The Middle Bridge Mystery (published posthumously 1929)
