= Alphonse Jolly =

French dramatist and librarian

Alphonse Jolly (1810 – 10 February 1893), born Louis-Alphonse Leveaux, was a French dramatist and librarian.
