= Josef Svatopluk Machar =

Czech poet and essayist (1864-1942)

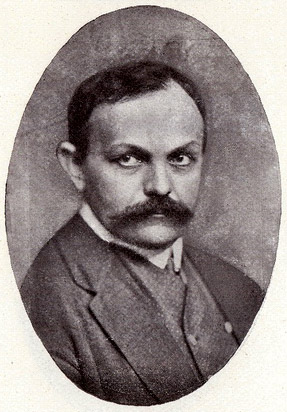
- Josef Svatopluk Machar before 1923
- Born: 29 February 1864; Kolín, Kingdom of Bohemia, Austrian Empire
- Died: 17 March 1942 (aged 78); Prague, Protectorate of Bohemia and Moravia
- Resting place: Brandýs nad Labem
- Occupations: Writer, journalist

Josef Svatopluk Machar (Czech pronunciation: [ˈjozɛf ˈsvatopluk ˈmaxar]; 1864 – 1942) was a Czech poet and essayist. A leader of the realist movement in Czech poetry and a master of colloquial Czech, Machar was active in anti-Austrian political circles in Vienna. Many of his poems were satires of political and social conditions. In the poetic cycle The Conscience of the Ages (1901–1921), of which Golgotha was the initial volume, he contrasted antique with Christian civilization, favoring the former. His Magdalena (1893, translated into English by Leo Wiener, 1916), a satirical novel in verse, concerns the treatment of women. Both Machar's use of colloquial diction and his skepticism greatly influenced Czech literature and public opinion. He was the father of Sylva Macharová, one of the first Czech nurses and first head of the Czech School of Nursing.

He cooperated with T. G. Masaryk resistance organization Maffie from December 1914. Machar and Masaryk were collaborators and close friends. After the creation of the Czechoslovak republic in 1918, Masaryk was acclamated as a president of the new state, Machar became a chief inspector of the Czechoslovak army. He also wrote a book of memories on his service. However in mid 1920's the relations between Masaryk and Machar worsened gradually. As a result Machar lost his position within the army and the friendship with Masaryk has ended.
