= Columbia's Courtship =

1893 book by Walter Crane

Columbia's Courtship: A Picture History of the United States in Twelve Emblematic Designs in Color with Accompanying Verses
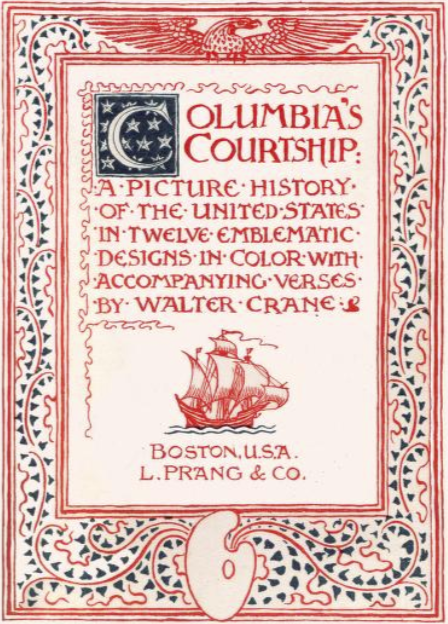
- Cover for Columbia's Courtship: A Picture History of the United States in Twelve Emblematic Designs in Color with Accompanying Verses (1893)
- Author: Walter Crane
- Publisher: Louis Prang
- Publication date: 1893

Columbia's Courtship: A Picture History of the United States in Twelve Emblematic Designs in Color with Accompanying Verses is an 1893 illustrated book by Walter Crane, who made both the illustrations and the text. The twelve colored lithographs present a romantic overview of American history in verse, illustrated in a Pre-Raphaelite style. The lithographs are numbered with Roman numerals above text. The book was prepared for the World's Columbian Exposition and was published by Louis Prang.

The Norseman lithograph refers to Erik the Red and his journey to the New World. The Dutchman features a banner with Leo Belgicus and emphasizes Dutch commercial penetration of North America. The Englishman lithograph presents a visual and narrative reference to the Jamestown Colony. The Frenchman lithograph reflects Crane's strong support of Irish Home Rule movement, although it's unclear whether that symbolism was intentional. The lithograph featuring other nations depicts an Irishman with harp and shamrock, the Russian, the German, the Chinese, and the African. Each is referenced by a shield on borders.

== Illustrations ==
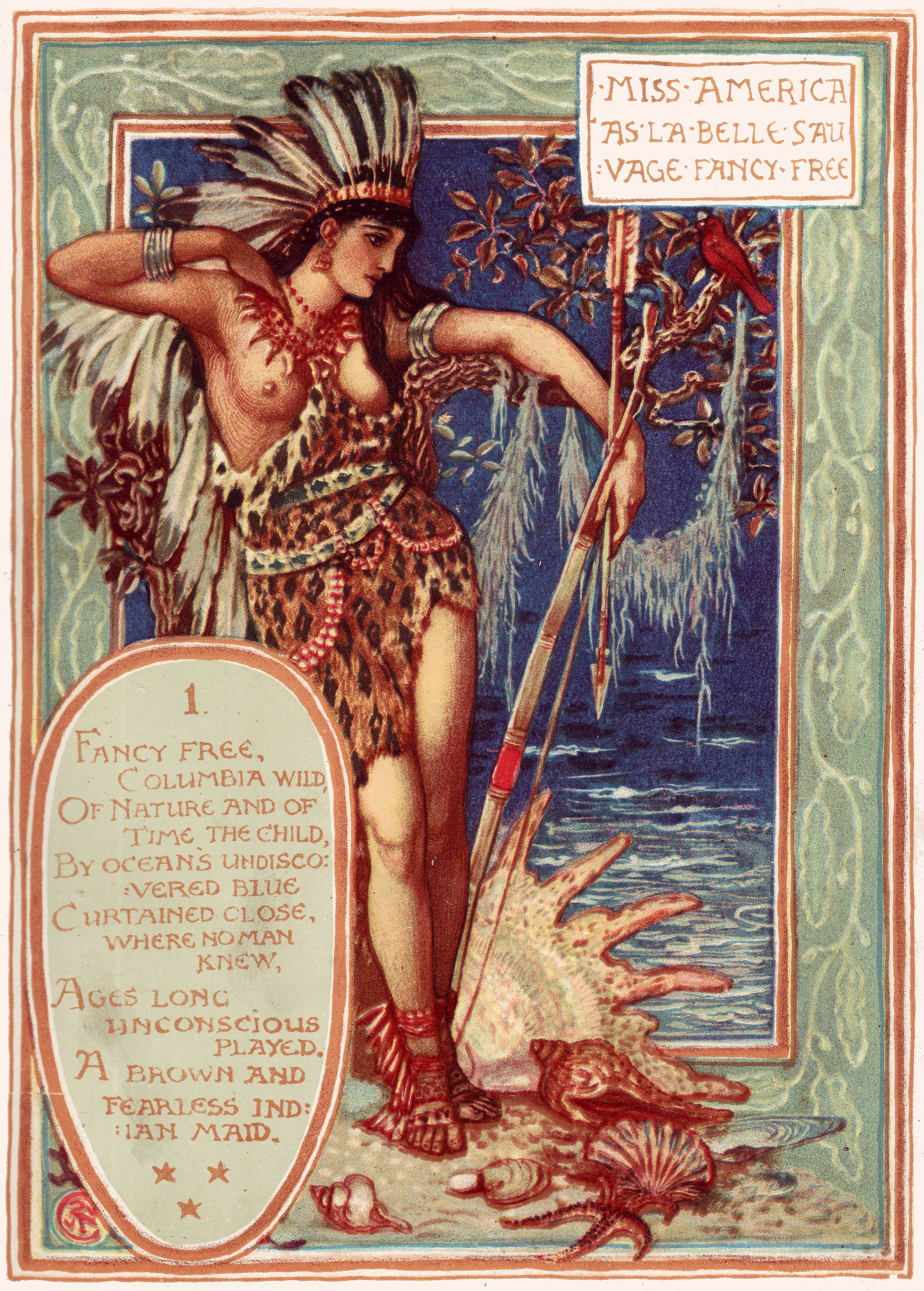
I (Miss America)

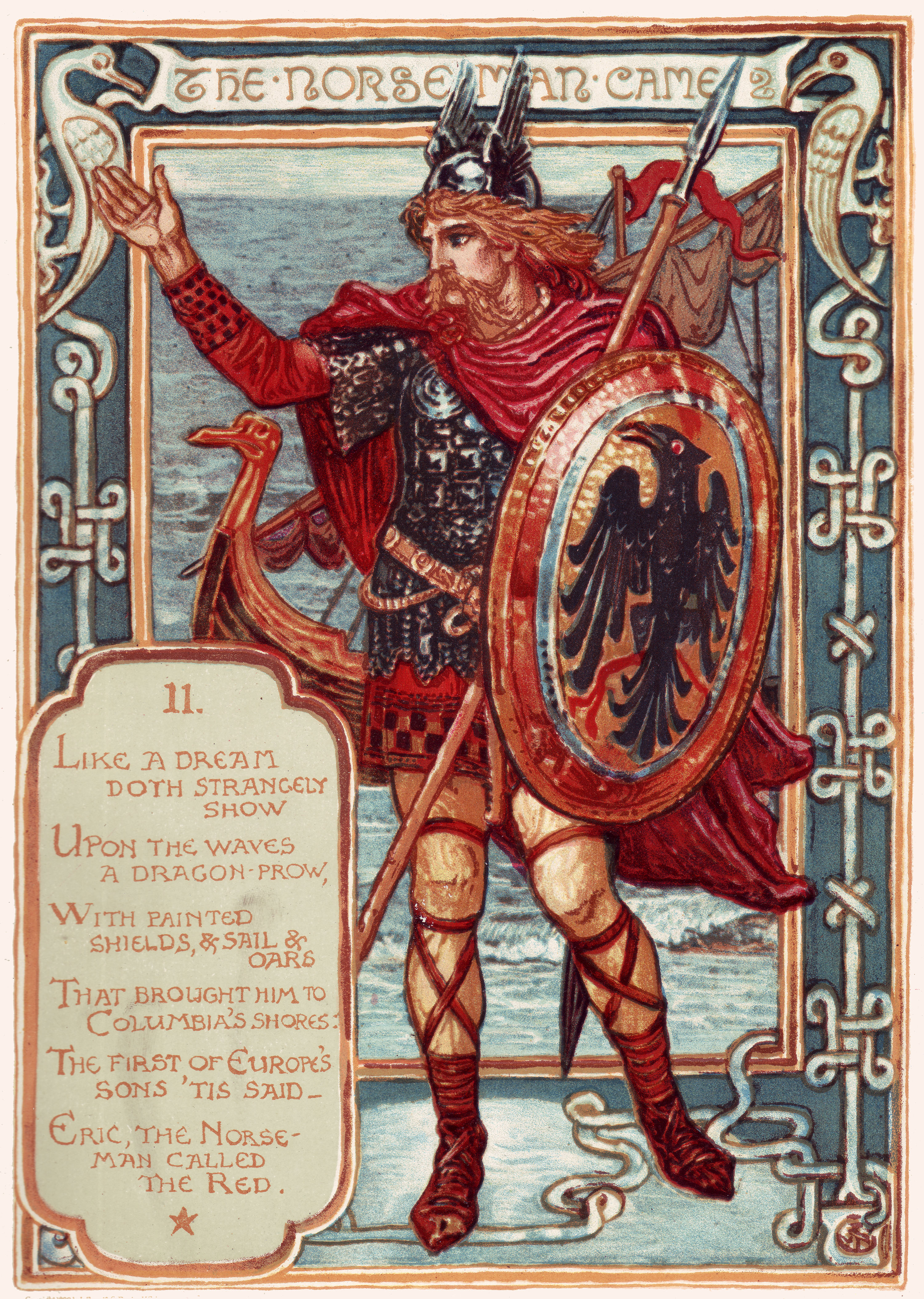
II (The Norseman)

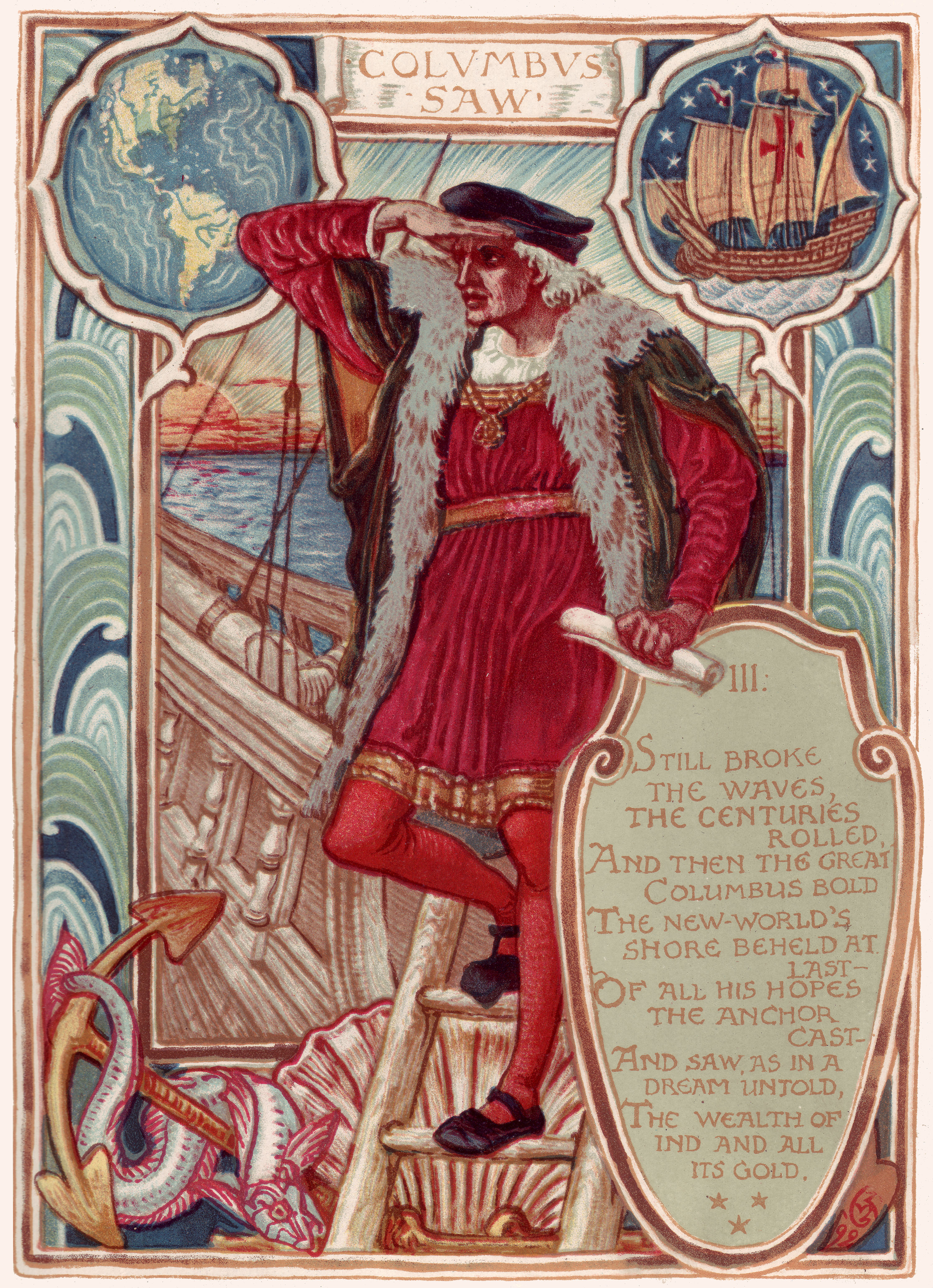
III (Christopher Columbus)

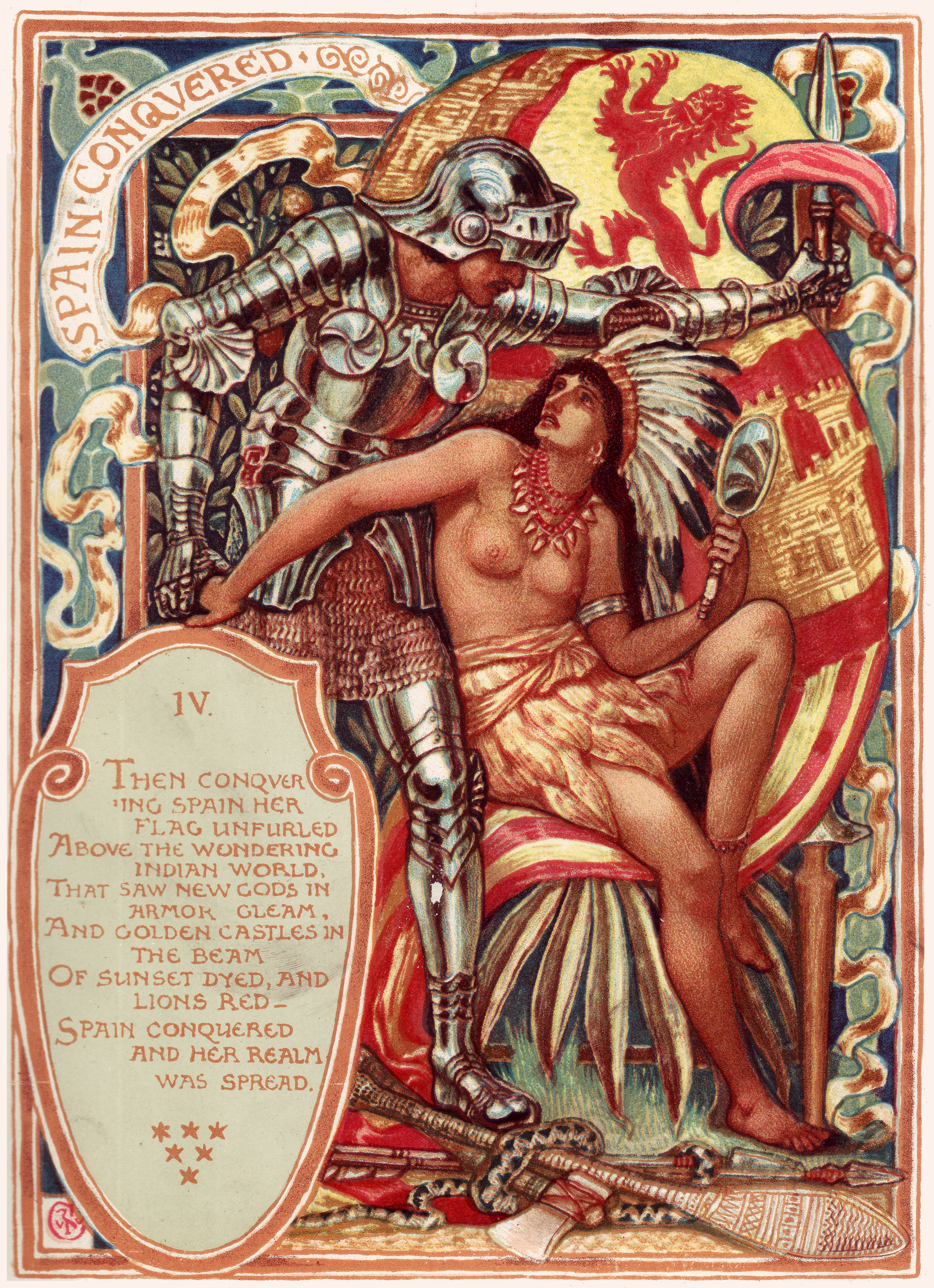
IV (Spain Conquered)

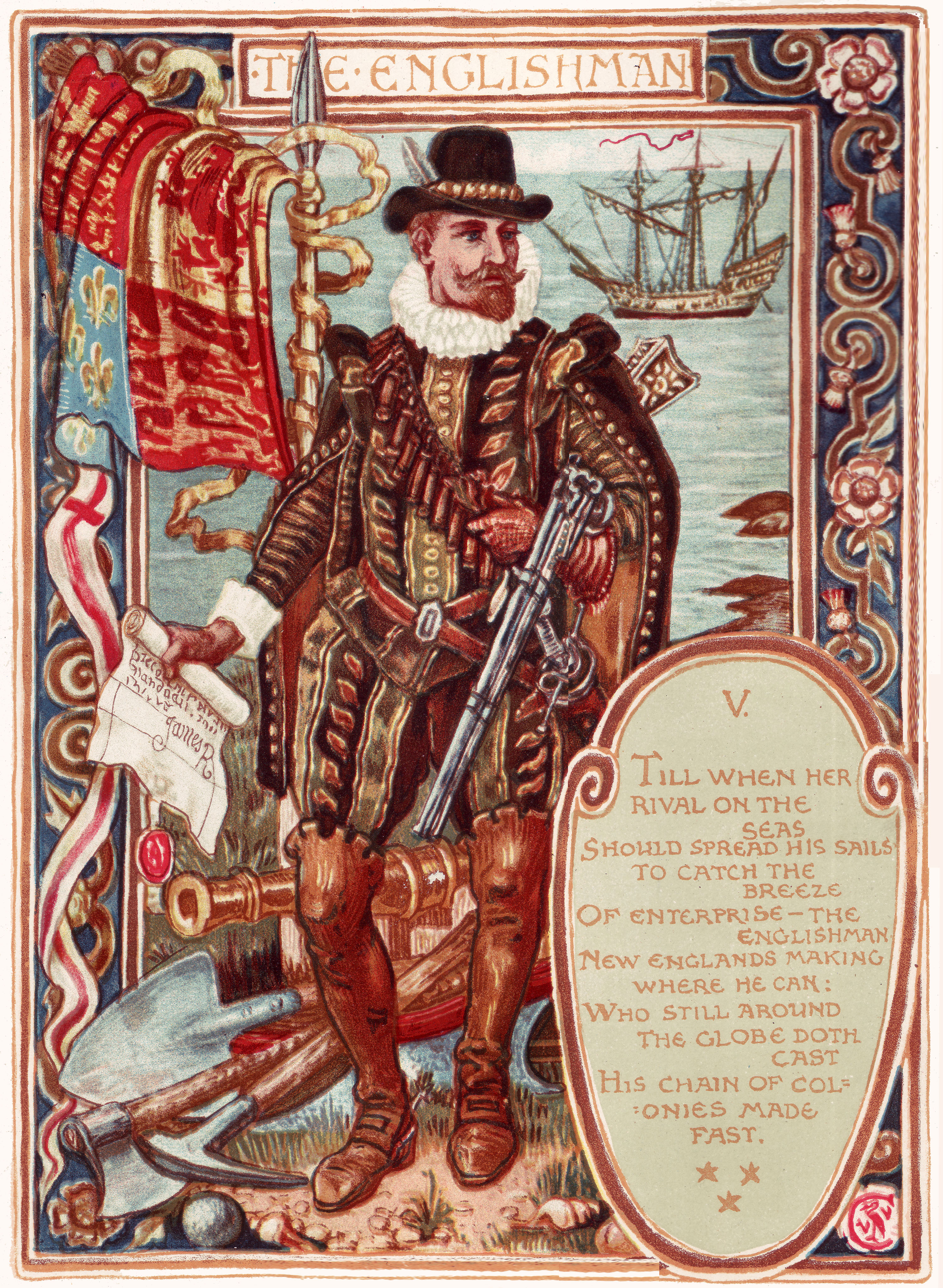
V (The Englishman)

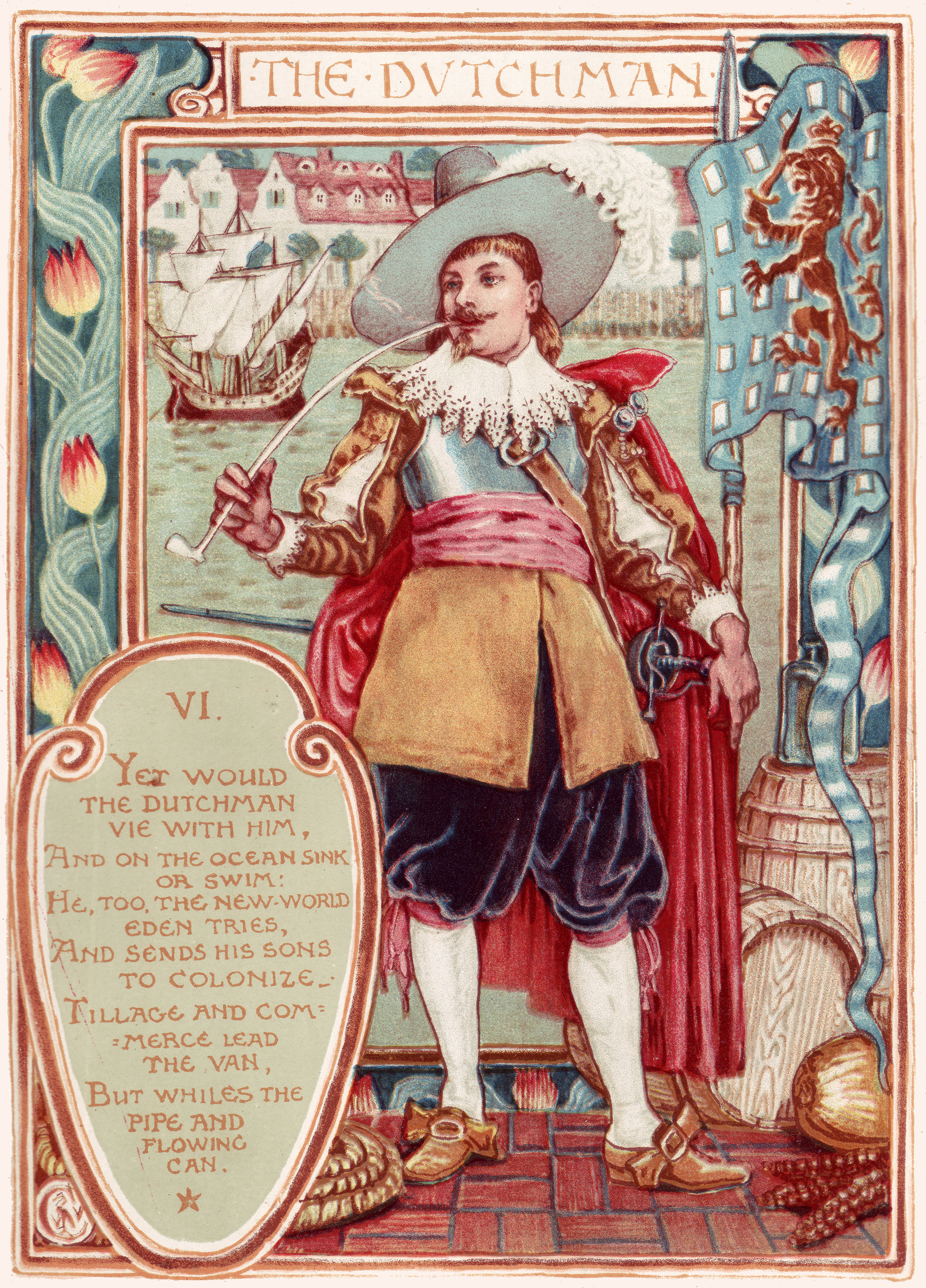
VI (The Dutchman)

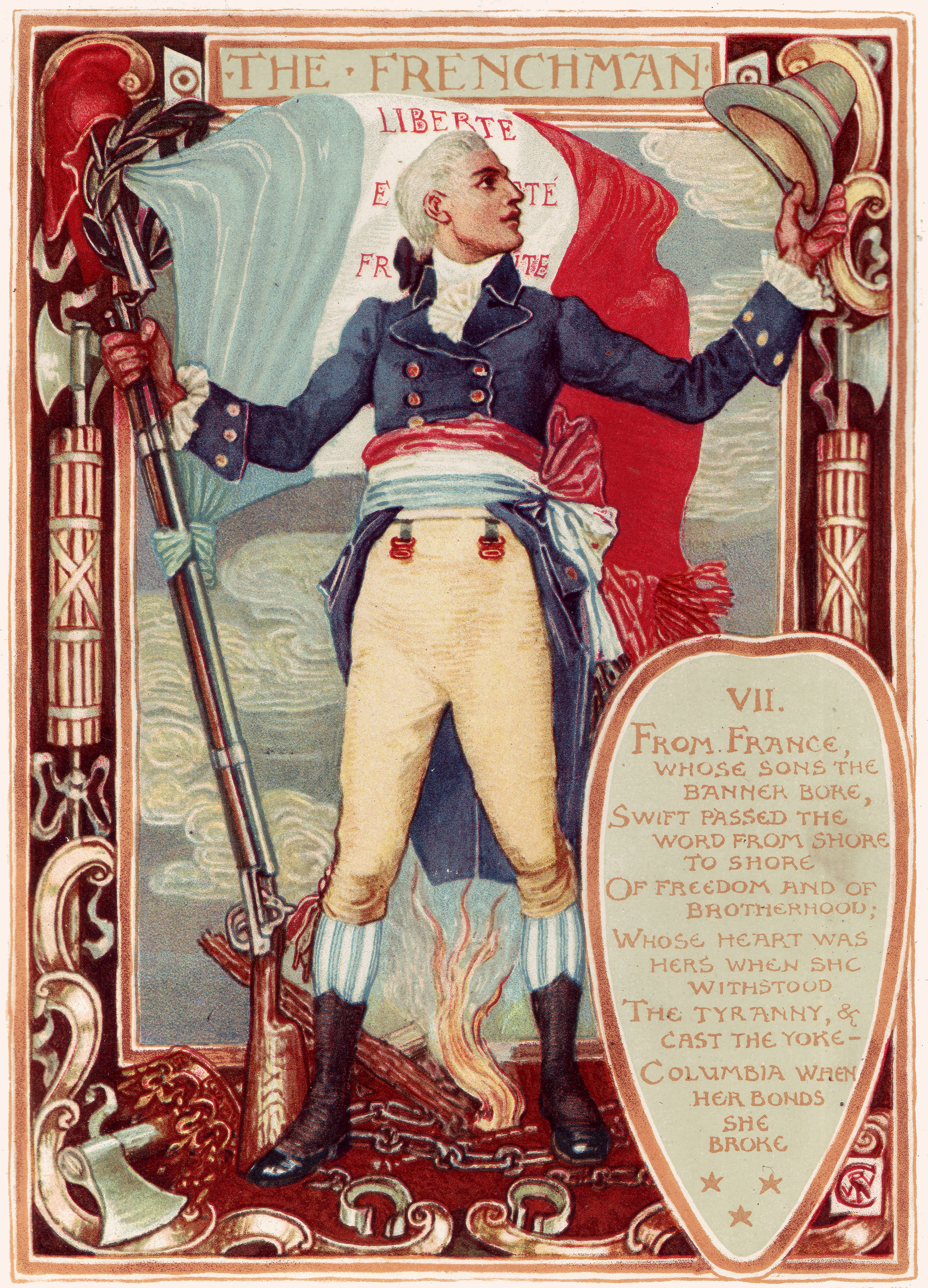
VII (The Frenchman)

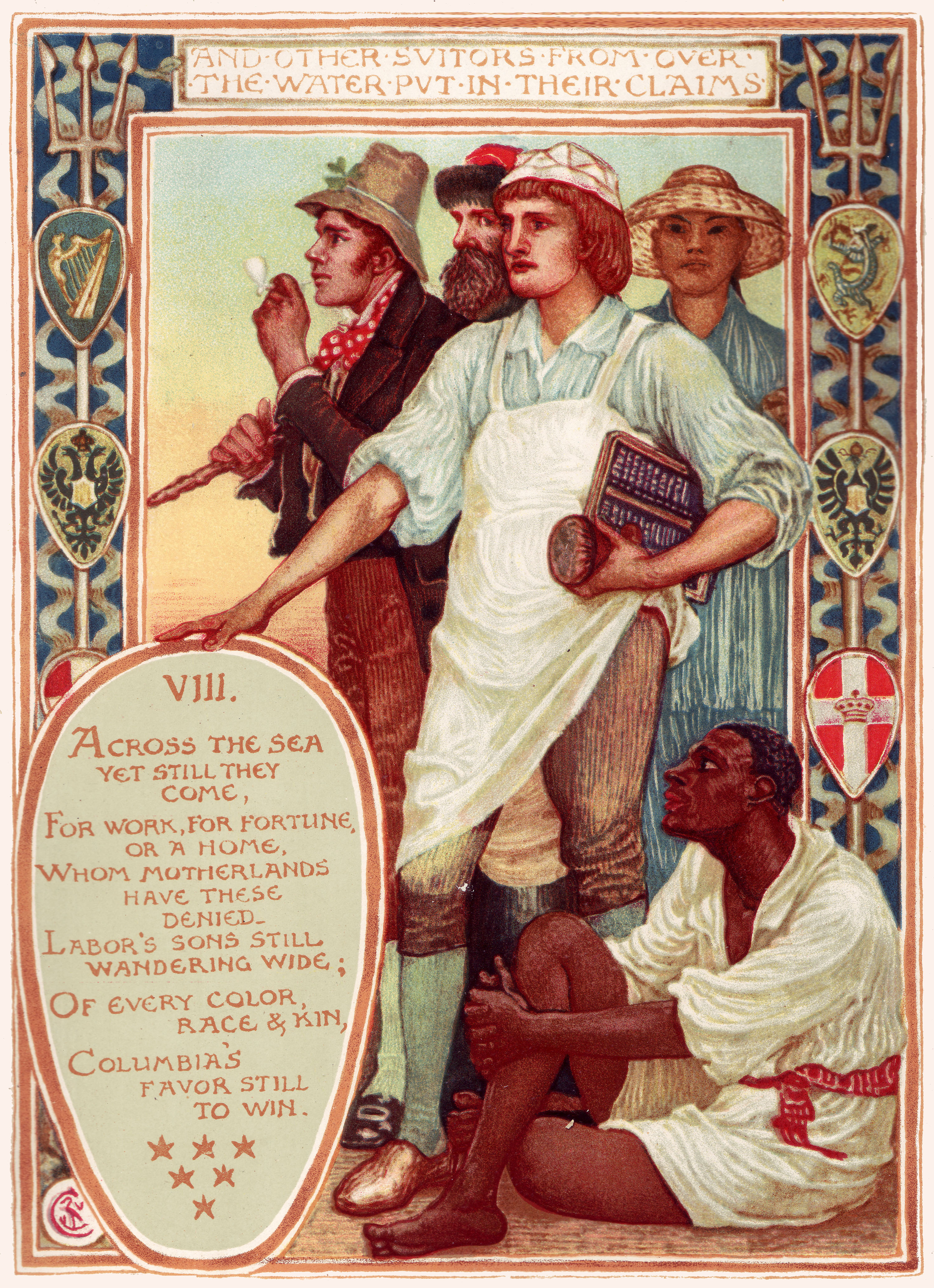
VIII (Other nations)

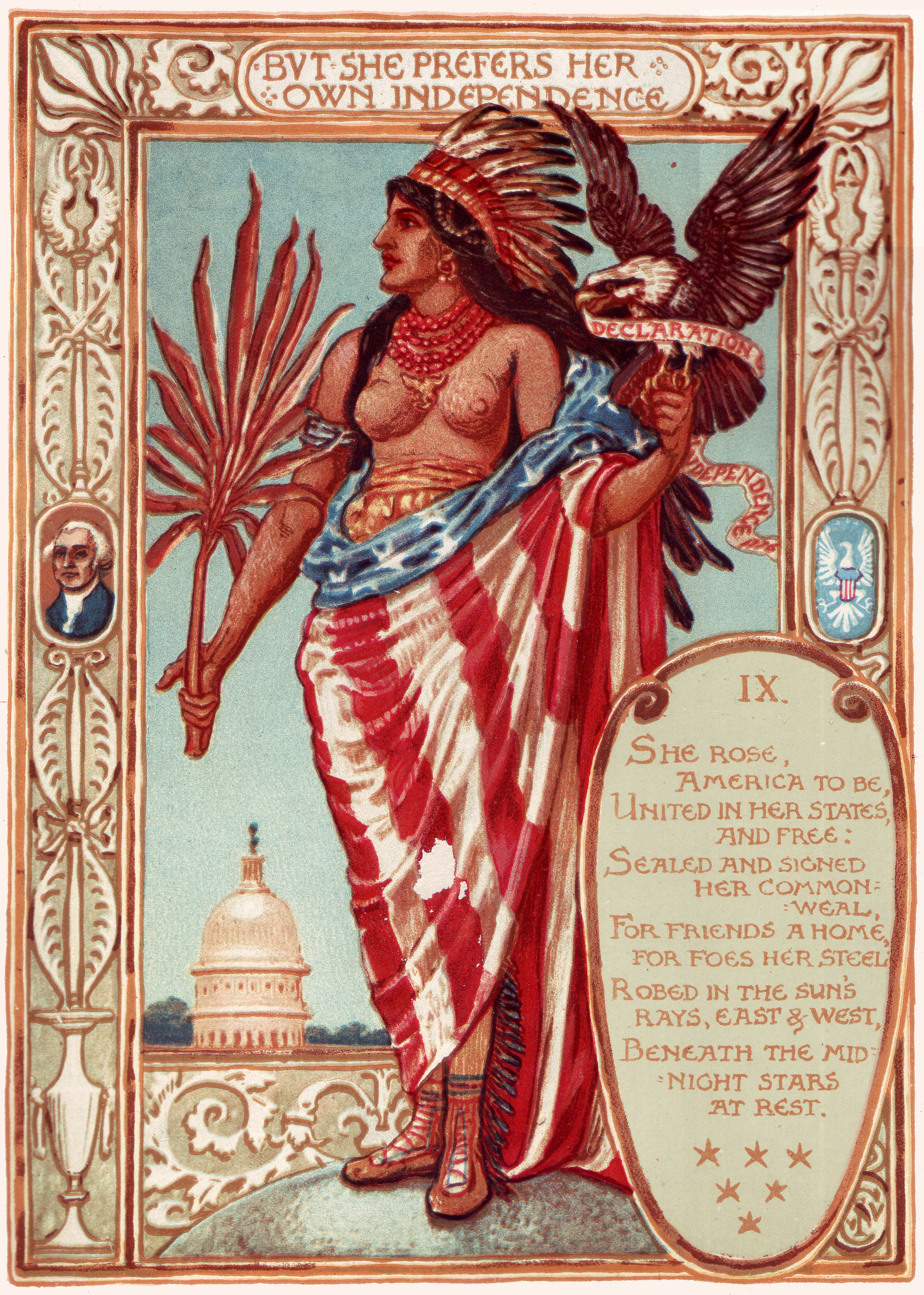
IX (Declaration of Independence)

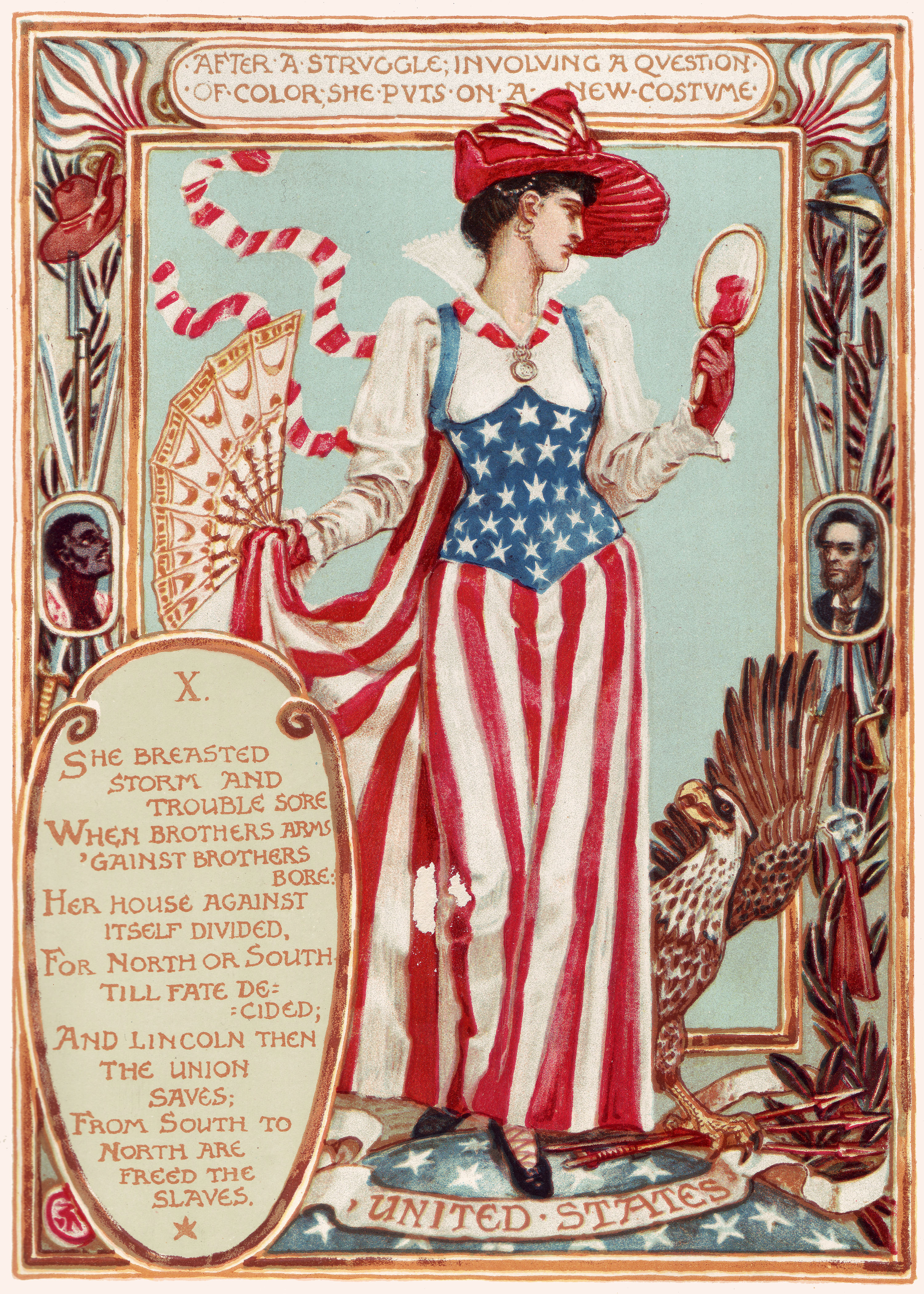
X (Personification of the United States)

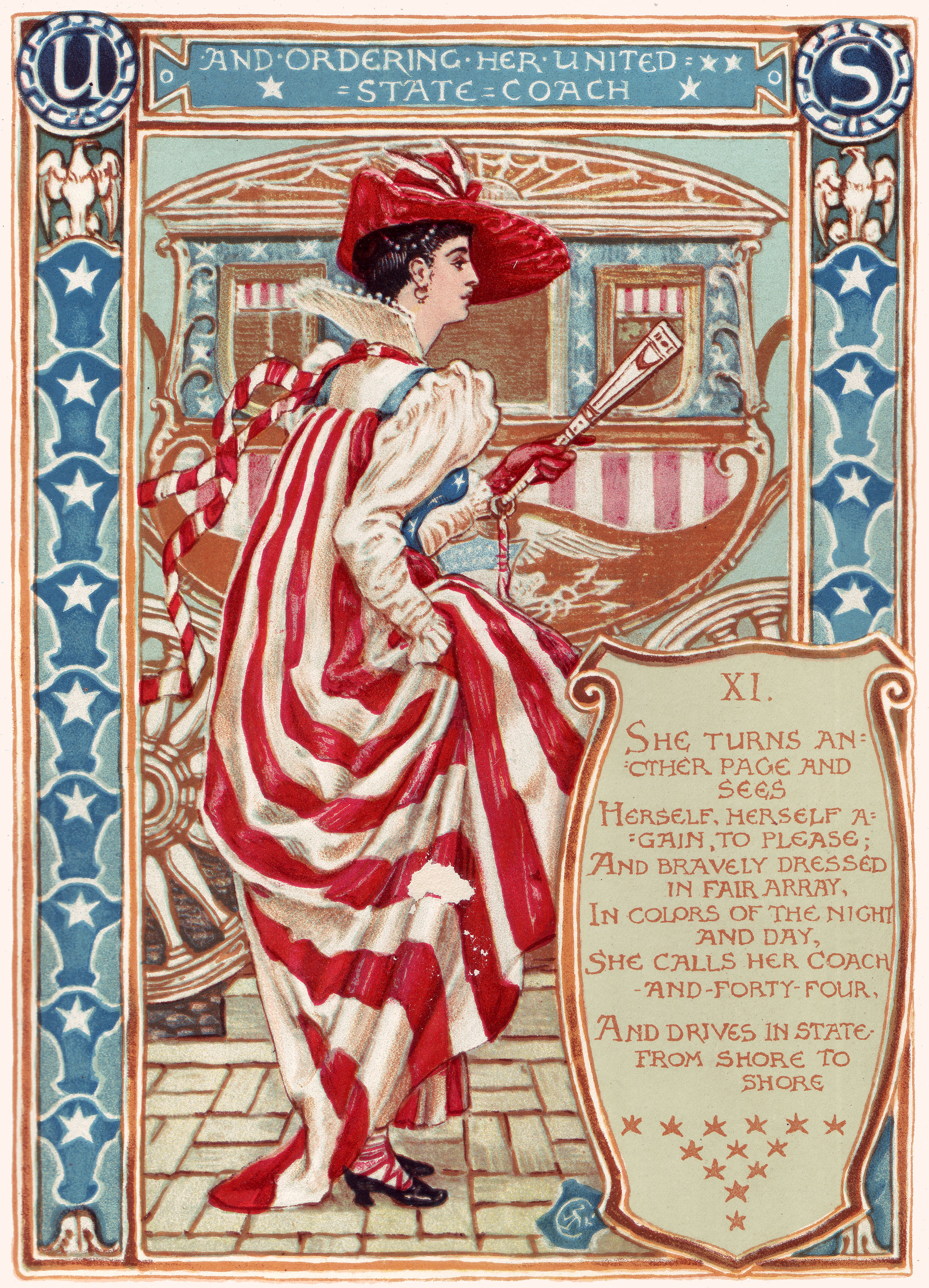
XI (Personification of the United States ordering a coach)

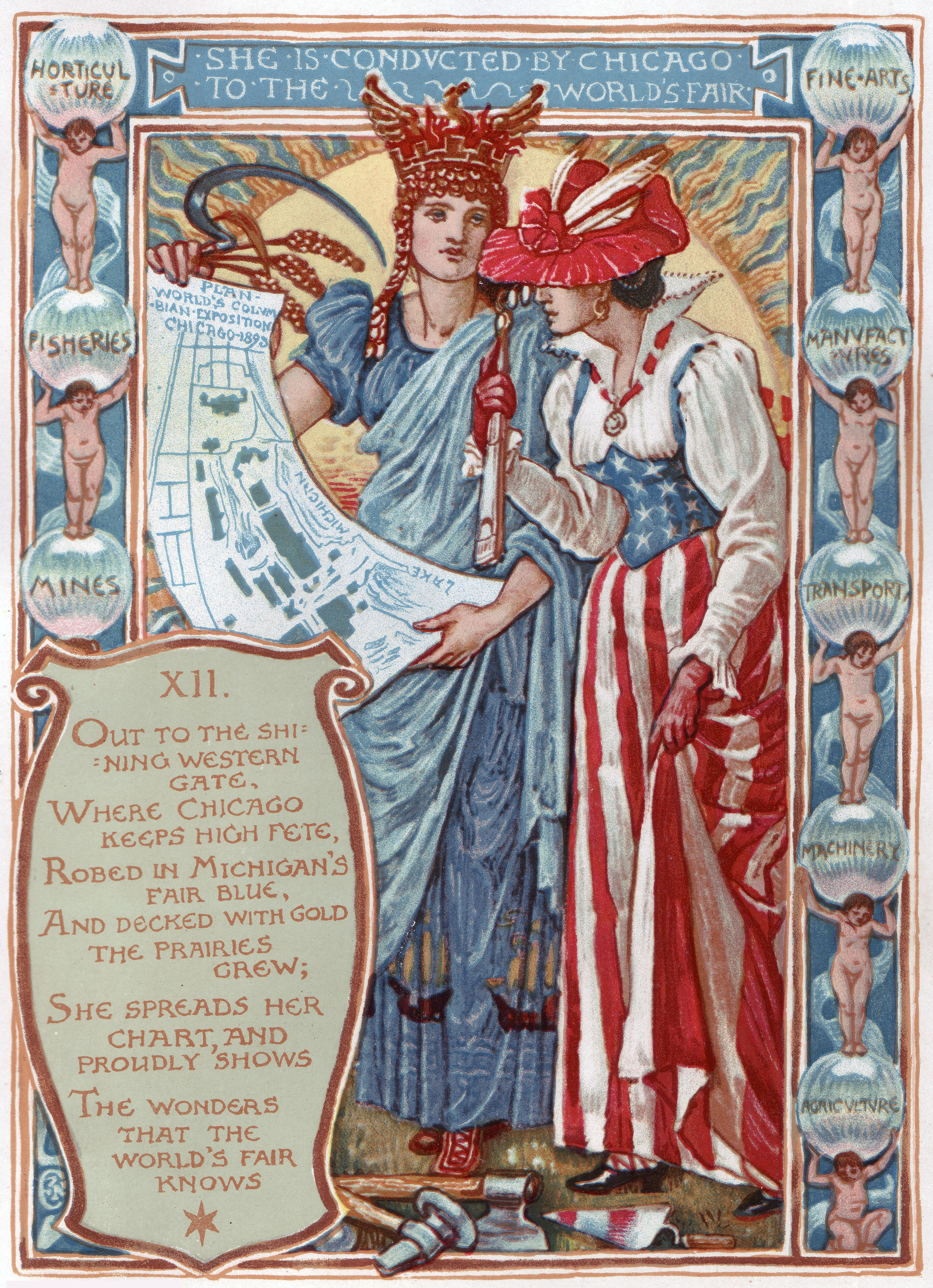
XII (Presentation of the plan for World's Columbian Exposition)
