= Essays in London and Elsewhere =

1893 book by Henry James

- First UK edition
- Author: Henry James
- Language: English
- Genre: Literary criticism
- Publisher: James R. Osgood, McIlvane & Co., London; Harper & Brothers, New York City
- Publication date: Osgood: 17-Jun-1893; Harper: 12-Sept-1893
- Publication place: United Kingdom, United States
- Media type: Print
- Pages: Osgood: 320; Harper: 305

Essays in London and Elsewhere is a book of literary criticism by Henry James published in 1893. The book collected essays that James had written over the preceding several years on a wide range of writers including James Russell Lowell, Gustave Flaubert, Robert Browning and Henrik Ibsen. The book also included an interesting general essay on the role of the critic in literature and a piece of travel writing about London.

== Summary and themes ==
James wrote many of these essays while he was busy with his ultimately disastrous effort to become a successful playwright. So it's not surprising that two of the essays deal with the theater. One of them is a graceful eulogy for his friend, the great actress Frances Anne Kemble, with "her fine, anxious humanity, the generosity of her sympathies, and the grand line and mass of her personality." The other is a surprisingly emphatic defense of Henrik Ibsen, whose work caused London audiences to "sweep the whole keyboard of emotion, from frantic enjoyment to ineffable disgust."

James shows his usual interest in French writers with three essays including a perceptive appreciation of Pierre Loti, who "speaks better than anything else of the ocean, the thing in the world that, after the human race, has most intensity and variety of life." James also writes generously of his old friend James Russell Lowell: "He had his trammels and his sorrows, but he drank deep of the tonic draught, and he will long count as an erect fighting figure on the side of optimism and beauty."

The book closes with an amusing dialogue called An Animated Conversation. The characters talk long and wittily of the literary relationship between Britain and America. The wisest speaker finally concludes:

"A body of English people crossed the Atlantic and sat down in a new climate on a new soil, amid new circumstances. It was a new heaven and a new earth. They invented new institutions, they encountered different needs. They developed a particular physique, as people do in a particular medium, and they began to speak in a new voice. They went in for democracy, and that alone would affect--it has affected--the tone immensely. C'est bien le moins (do you follow?) that that tone should have had its range and that the language they brought over with them should have become different to express different things. A language is a very sensitive organism. It must be convenient--it must be handy. It serves, it obeys, it accommodates itself."

=== Table of contents ===
London; James Russell Lowell; Frances Anne Kemble; Gustave Flaubert; Pierre Loti; The Journal of the Brothers Goncourt	Browning in Westminster Abbey; Henrik Ibsen; Mrs. Humphry Ward; Criticism; An Animated Conversation

== Critical evaluation ==
James' ability to understand and appreciate writers very different from himself shines through this book's essays on Ibsen and Loti. He brings to each a deep appreciation of their outlook on life and their harsh but effective techniques for presenting it. James is never afraid to point out what he considers faults or omissions in the writers he discusses. But his criticism is never captious, never a wish that a writer was somebody he is not.

The essay on Ibsen has biographical relevance and poignant to James, as he had experienced a public failure in the theater a few years after this book was published. The respect James pays to the renowned playwright betrays how much he wanted to succeed in the theater himself, and how bitter his eventual defeat would be.
