= Magdalena (novel) =

1893 novel by Josef Svatopluk Machar

Magdalena is a Czech novel, written by Josef Svatopluk Machar. It was first published in 1893.
