= Henry Olerich =

American novelist

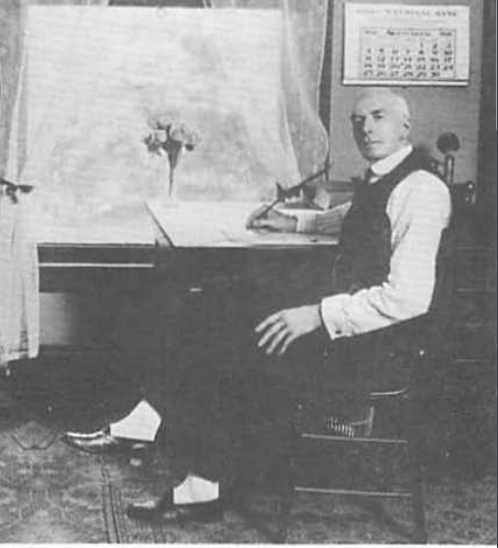
- Born: February 1851; Hazel Green, WI
- Died: May 10, 1927 (aged 76); Butte, Nebraska
- Occupation: Author
- Writing career
- Genre: Utopian fiction

Henry Olerich (1851–1927) was a utopian author from Nebraska. In his best known novel, A Cityless and Countryless World (1893), a Martian lands on earth to teach humans how to create paradise. The method was to build houses that could hold 1,000 people, who would collectively farm and work.

Olerich continued his utopian projections in two subsequent books, Modern Paradise (1915) and The Story of the World a Thousand Years Hence (1923).

Olerich was also a lawyer, farmer, teacher, and machinist; he once earned a patent for an improved tractor. He wrote a range of other works as well, including one titled "Viola Olerich, the Famous Baby Scholar: An Experiment in Education," about his adopted daughter who was for a short time a celebrated child prodigy.

Olerich died by suicide, prompted in part by declining health. Yet he left an abundant supply of autobiographical writings that "reveal a persistent desire for the public recognition that always eluded him....The overall impression...is one of desperation on Olerich's part."

The full texts of A Cityless and Countryless World and his other two books have been scanned and can be found online here, whilst two of the books have been transcribed on Project Gutenberg.

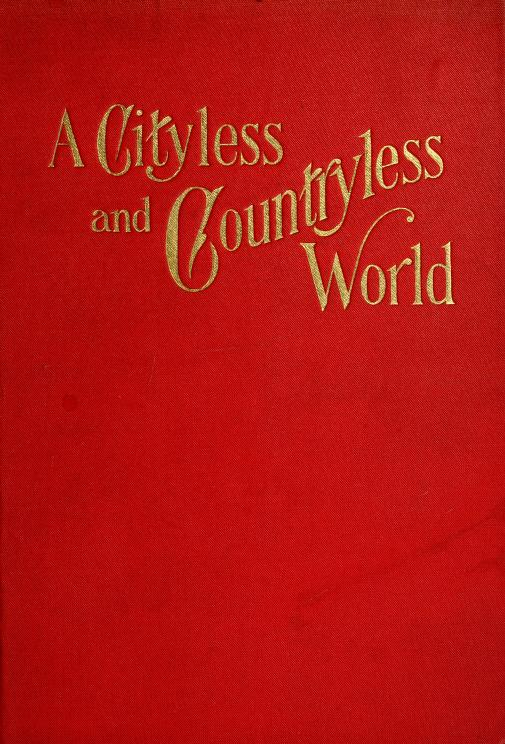
First edition cover of A Cityless and Countryless World (1893)
