= The Heavenly Twins =

The Heavenly Twins is a novel by Sarah Grand. Published in 1893 by William Heinemann, the novel was built around the New Woman ideal and was critical of the sexual double standard between men and women within marriage. It dealt frankly with the dangers of sexually transmitted diseases like syphilis. It was the first novel to seriously examine men's sexuality in relation to venereal disease. Grand's knowledge on diseases of this type were largely derived from her husband's work as surgeon. He had treated many men and women for venereal disease as a hospital and army physician. The novel is viewed as a feminist work with compelling arguments in favor of sex education for women in order to protect women from sexual and spousal abuse.

The Heavenly Twins was an overnight success, and became a best seller. By 1923 the novel was in its 10th edition.
