= Wisting =

Wisting may refer to:

- Wisting (TV series), Norwegian television series
- William Wisting, fictional detective created by Jørn Lier Horst
- Oscar Wisting (1871–1936), Norwegian polar explorer
- Mount Wisting, summit in Antarctica
