= Hedda Award =

Norwegian theatre award

- Native name: Heddaprisen
- Description: Excellence in Norwegian theatre
- Country: Norway
- Presented by: Association of Norwegian Theatres and Orchestras
- Website: www.heddaprisen.no

The Hedda Award (Heddaprisen) is a Norwegian theatre award, first presented in 1998. It is named after the character "Hedda" from Henrik Ibsen's play Hedda Gabler. Among its categories, which have varied over the years, are: Best Theatre Production, Best Direction, Best Stage Performance, and occasionally an honorary prize. The prize is administered by the Association of Norwegian Theatres and Orchestras (Norsk teater- og orkesterforening) in collaboration with the Norwegian Theater Leaders' Forum (Norsk teaterlederforum).

Recipients of the honorary prize have included Wenche Foss (in 2002), Jon Fosse (2003), and Toralv Maurstad and Espen Skjønberg (both in 2005). Else Nordvang in 2008, Edith Roger in 2010 and Bjørn Sundquist in 2017.

== Awards ==
Prismottaker	Award	Year	for...
Nina Ellen Ødegård	Best Actress	2017	
Jan Sælid	Best Actor	2017	
Hildegunn Eggen	Best Supporting Actress	2017	
Toralv Maurstad	Best Supporting Actor	2017	
Sigrid Strøm Reibo	Best Direction	2017	
Orlando	Production of the year	2017	
Brune	Best production for children	2017	
We come from far, far away	Best production for youth	2017	
Robert Wilson	Best Stage/Costume Design	2017	
Ove Alexander Jamt Dahl, Morten Halle, Christine Lohre and Olav Nordhagen	Best Audiovisual Design	2017	
Arne Lygre	Best Stage Text	2017	
Ensemble «Edda»	Honorable Artistic Achievement	2017	
Bjørn Sundquist	Hedda Honorary Award	2017	
Ane Dahl Torp	Best Actress	2016	
Kåre Conradi	Best Actor	2016	
Mari Hauge Einbu	Best Supporting Actress	2016	
Per Schaanning	Best Supporting Actor	2016	
Tore Vagn Lid	Best Direction	2016	
Solaris korrigert	Production of the year	2016	
Den sommeren pappa ble homo	Best production for children and youth	2016	
Sjur Miljeteig	Best Audiovisual Design	2016	
Tore Vagn Lid and Cecilie Løveid	Best Stage Text	2016	
Olav Myrtvedt	Best Stage/Costume Design	2016	
Beaivváš Sámi Našunálateáhter	Honorable Artistic Achievement	2016	
Marie Blokhus	Best Actress	2015	
Torbjørn Eriksen	Best Actor	2015	
Lena Kristin Ellingsen	Best Supporting Actress	2015	
Espen Skjønberg	Best Supporting Actor	2015	
Hanne Tømta	Best Direction	2015	
Hamlet	Production of the year	2015	
Wizard of Oz	Best production for children and youth	2015	
Bård Lie Thorbjørnsen	Best Stage/Costume Design	2015	
Verdensteatret	Best Audiovisual Design	2015	
Alexander Mørk-Eidem	Best Stage Text	2015	
Hundre hemmeligheter	Best production for children and youth	2015	
Lisa Lie and PONR	Honorable Artistic Achievement	2015	
Mariann Hole	Best Actress	2014	
Vidar Magnussen	Best Actor	2014	
Renate Reinsve	Best Supporting Actress	2014	
Sigmund Sæverud	Best Supporting Actor	2014	
Tyra Tønnessen	Best Direction	2014	
Perpleks	Production of the year	2014	
Bård Lie Thorbjørnsen	Best Stage/Costume Design	2014	
Eirik Hegdal, Asle Karstad and Trondheim Voices	Best Audiovisual Design	2014	
Alan Øyen and Andrew Wale	Best Stage Text	2014	
Verdensteatret	Hedda Honorary Award	2014	
Gisken Armand	Best Actress	2013	
Ingar Helge Gimle	Best Actor	2013	
Kine Bendixen	Best Supporting Actress	2013	
Espen Klouman Høiner	Best Supporting Actor	2013	
Oskaras Koršunovas	Best Direction	2013	
Stalker	Production of the year	2013	
Eg – Ik, Ich, I	Best production for children and youth	2013	
Lawrence Malstaf	Best Stage/Costume Design	2013	
Roger Gihlemoen	Best Audiovisual Design	2013	
De utvalgte	Honorable Artistic Achievement	2013	
Ane Dahl Torp	Best Actress	2012	
Mattis Herman Nyquist	Best Actor	2012	
Gjertrud Jynge	Best Supporting Actress	2012	
Torbjørn Eriksen	Best Supporting Actor	2012	
Sigrid Strøm Reibo	Best Direction	2012	
Abrahams barn	Production of the year	2012	
Veggen	Best production for children and youth	2012	
Boya Bøckman	Best Visual Design	2012	
Thorbjørn Harr, Mariann Hole and Jan Gunnar Røise	Honorable Artistic Achievement	2012	
Heidi Gjermundsen Broch	Best Actress	2011	
Henrik Mestad	Best Actor	2011	
Liv Bernhoft Osa	Best Supporting Actress	2011	
Herman Bernhoft	Best Supporting Actor	2011	
Peer Perez Øian	Best Direction	2011	
John-Kristian Alsaker, Torbjørn Ljunggren and Øyvind Wangensteen	Best Visual Design	2011	
Det eviga leendet	Production of the year	2011	
Oslo Internasjonale Teater	Honorable Artistic Achievement	2011	
Trine Wiggen	Best Actress	2010	
Anders Mordal	Best Actor	2010	
Valborg Frøysnes	Best Supporting Actress	2010	
Christian Skolmen	Best Supporting Actor	2010	
Victoria Meirik	Best Direction	2010	
Vi som er hundre	Production of the year	2010	
Før det ringer	Best production for children and youth	2010	
Milja Salovaara	Best Visual Design	2010	
Sogn og Fjordane Teater director of the Theatre Terje Lyngstad	Honorable Artistic Achievement	2010	
Edith Roger	Hedda Honorary Award	2010	
Birgitta Victoria Svendsen	Best Actress	2009	
Mads Ousdal	Best Actor	2009	
Kirsti Stubø	Best Supporting Actress	2009	
Pål Rønning	Best Supporting Actor	2009	
Eirik Stubø	Best Direction	2009	
En vanlig dag i helvete	Production of the year	2009	
Operasjon Almenrausch	Theatre project of the year	2009	
Ellen Ruge	Best Stage/Costume/Lighting Design	2009	
Jungle Book	Best production for children and youth	2009	
Kjersti Sandal	Best Actress	2008	
Anders Baasmo Christiansen	Best Actor	2008	
Mari Maurstad	Best Supporting Actress	2008	
Morten Espeland	Best Supporting Actor	2008	
Anne-Karen Hytten	Best Direction	2008	
Mann = Mann	Most Notable Theater Project	2008	
Ingrid Tønder	Best Stage/Costume/Lighting Design	2008	
Vinterdvale	Best production for children and youth	2008	
Christopher Nielsen	Most Promising Newcomer	2008	
Tormod Lindgren	Honorable Achievement	2008	
Elsa Nordvang	Hedda Honorary Award	2008	
Birgitte Larsen	Best Actress	2007	
Sven Nordin	Best Actor	2007	
Hildegunn Eggen	Best Supporting Actress	2007	
Pål Sverre Valheim Hagen	Best Supporting Actor	2007	
Øyvind Osmo Eriksen	Best Direction	2007	
Growth of the Soil [Markens Grøde]	Most Notable Theater Project	2007	
Nora Furuholmen and Joakim Moe Røisland	Best Stage/Costume/Lighting Design	2007	
Betre utan ball	Best production for children and youth	2007	
Alexander Rybak	Most Promising Newcomer	2007	
Per Chr. Revholt and Ket Iren Lødemel	Honorable Achievement	2007	
Ingunn Beate Øyen	Best Actress	2006	
Øystein Røger	Best Actor	2006	
Lise Fjeldstad	Best Supporting Actress	2006	
Nils Ole Oftebro	Best Supporting Actor	2006	
Sophia Jupiter	Best Direction	2006	
Bollywood Ibsen - Fruen fra Det indiske hav	Most Notable Theater Project	2006	
Jūratė Paulėkaitė	Best Stage/Costume/Lighting Design	2006	
Trollprinsen	Best production for children and youth	2006	
Erlend Sandem	Most Promising Newcomer	2006	
Sogn og Fjordane Teater	Honorable Achievement	2006	
Nina Ellen Ødegård	Honorable Artistic Achievement	2005	
Grusomhetens Teater	Performing Arts Hub Norway's Award	2005	
Sebastian Hartmann	Best Direction	2005	
Staff at Rogaland Teater	Honorable Achievement	2005	
Ingrid Bolsø Berdal	Most Promising Newcomer (and Hedda grant)	2005	
Peer Gynt	Production of the year	2005	
Christian Friedländer	Best Stage/Costume/Lighting Design	2005	
Espen Skjønberg and Toralv Maurstad	Hedda Honorary Award	2005	
Jan Grønli	Particularly excellent performance	2004	
Purpur og gull	Production of the year	2004	
Gábor Zsámbéki	Best Direction	2004	
Ingrid Nylander	Best Stage/Costume/Lighting Design	2004	
Jesper Halle	(Open category)	2004	
Lasse Kolsrud	Most Promising Newcomer (and Hedda grant)	2004	
Baktruppen	Performing Arts Hub Norway's Award	2004	
Marianne Westby	Simen's Grant	2004	
Laila Goody	Particularly excellent performance	2003	
Who's Afraid of Virginia Woolf?	Production of the year	2003	
Kjetil Bang-Hansen	Best Direction	2003	
Tre mødre - ex auditorio	Best production for children and youth	2003	
Kari Gravklev	Best Stage/Costume Design	2003	
Bjørnar Teigen	Most Promising Newcomer (and Hedda grant)	2003	
Oddvar Nilsen	Simen's Grant	2003	
Arlene Wilkes	Particularly excellent performance	2002	
There	Production of the year	2002	
Tamas Ascher	Best Direction	2002	
John-Kristian Alsaker	Best Stage/Costume/Lighting Design	2002	
Lisbeth Narud	(Open category)	2002	
Wenche Foss	Hedda Honorary Award	2002	
Terje Strømdahl	Particularly excellent performance	2001	
Runar Hodne	Best Direction	2001	
Amadeus	Production of the year	2001	
Gerd Zoe Christiansen	Best Stage/Costume Design	2001	
Marit Moum Aune	(Open category)	2001	
Trond Espen Seim	Particularly excellent performance	2000	
Alexander Mørk-Eidem	Best Direction	2000	
Personkrins 3:1	Production of the year	2000	
Aage Gaup and Berit Marit Hætta	Best Stage/Costume Design	2000	
Teater Ibsen	(Open category)	2000	
Anne Krigsvoll	Particularly excellent performance	1999	
Stein Winge	Best Direction	1999	
Sult	Production of the year	1999	
Jo Strømgren	(Open category)	1999	
Iben Sandemose	Best Stage/Costume Design	1999	
Even Stormoen	Particularly excellent performance	1998	
Yngve Sundvor	Best Direction	1998	
Skjønnhetsdronninga	Production of the year	1998	
Kristin Bredal	(Open category)	1998	
Unni Walstad	Best Stage/Costume Design	1998	
