= Arnljot Strømme Svendsen =

Norwegian economist and politician (1921–2022)

Arnljot Ole Strømme-Svendsen (5 December 1921 – 5 January 2022) was a Norwegian economist and Conservative politician.

== Biography ==
Born in Kristiania, he was the son of Ole A. Strømm-Svendsen (Sweden and Norway, 1883–1975) and wife Dagmar Bærem (Sweden and Norway, 1886–1976). He graduated with the cand.oecon. degree in 1946, having finished his secondary education five years previously. In 1948 he was hired as a research fellow at the Norwegian School of Economics and Business Administration. He was promoted to docent in 1956, and to professor ten years later. He managed the Institute of Economics from 1957 to 1967 and the Institute of Shipping Economics from 1958 to his retirement in 1991. In 1953 he married Bertha I. Nygaard.

Having been a member of Bergen city council from 1956 to 1967, he chaired the local Conservative Party chapter from 1967 to 1970. In 1972 he led the county chapter of Ja til EF, the organization campaigning for "Yes" in the 1972 Norwegian European Communities membership referendum. Svendsen also chaired the board of the theatre Den Nationale Scene from 1960 to 1991, the Norwegian Theatres Association from 1970 to 1992, and the board of Den norske Creditbank's department in Bergen. He helped found the Rafto Foundation for Human Rights, chairing its board for ten years. He was also a board member of the Bergen International Festival, and an ordinary member of the National Wages Board.

He authored biographies on Vebjørn Tandberg (together with Helmer Dahl), Rolf Berntzen and Lothar Lindtner (with Alf H. Madsen), and Hilmar Reksten. Other important books are Sea Transport and Shipping Economics (1958), Industriens historie i Norge (1969, with Gunnar Christie Wasberg) and I fartens, kraftens og velstandens epoke (1977). His academic publications count approximately 120, and he was a member of the Selskapet til Vitenskapenes Fremme from 1967. Svendsen also won an Hedda Award and was a Knight, First Class of the Royal Norwegian Order of St. Olav.

Svendsen turned 100 in December 2021, and died on 5 January 2022.
