= Milja =

In Finland, girls named Milja has name day (Nimipäivä) on the 19th of May.

Milja is a given name. Notable people with the name include:

- Milja Hellsten (born 1990), Finnish curler
- Milja Salovaara (born 1972), Finnish costume designer, scenographer and set designer
- Milja Simonsen (born 1997), Faroese football forward
