= Hildegunn =

Hildegunn is a given name. Notable people with the given name include:

- Hildegunn Eggen (born 1953), Norwegian actress
- Hildegunn Gjertrud Hovdenak (born 1985), Norwegian racing cyclist
- Hildegunn Mikkelsplass (born 1969), Norwegian biathlete
- Hildegunn Øiseth (born 1966), Norwegian jazz musician
