= Lisbeth Bodd =

Norwegian performance artist

- Born: 28 January 1958
- Died: 28 September 2014 (aged 56); Oslo, Norway
- Occupation: Theatre leader
- Known for: Verdensteatret
- Awards: Hedda Honorary Award (2014)

Lisbeth Bodd (28 January 1958 – 28 September 2014) was a Norwegian performance artist and theatre leader.

She established the performance art group Verdensteatret in 1986, and was artistic director for the company until her death. Verdensteatret received the Hedda Honorary Award in 2014.

Bodd died in Oslo on 28 September 2014.
