= Kjersti Sandal =

Norwegian actress (born 1978)

- Born: 11 April 1978
- Awards: The Hedda Award for Best Actress (2008)

Kjersti Botn Sandal (born 11 April 1978) is a Norwegian actress. For her stage work she has won one Hedda Award.

== Career ==
Sandal was born in Ålesund, but grew up in Førde Municipality. She graduated from the National Academy of Theatre in 2001. She made her debut in Henrik Ibsen's En folkefiende at Den Nationale Scene in 2001.

Her role in Leonhard Frank's Karl and Anna, which premiered in 2007 at Rogaland Teater, earned her the Hedda Award for best female lead in 2008. Sandal also played in A Doll's House at Hålogaland Teater in 2008 before being employed at Nationaltheatret in 2010.

Sandal's film roles include Ballen i øyet (2000), Falling Sky (2002) and Føniks (2018), whereas her television credits include Kampen for tilværelsen (2014–2015) and Wisting (2019).

== Personal life ==
She is married to Kristian Lykkeslet Strømskag, who in 2019 became director of Teatret Vårt in Molde. The couple subsequently moved to Molde.

Awards
Preceded by Birgitte Larsen	Hedda Award for Best Actress; 2008	Succeeded by Birgitte Victoria Svendsen
