= Wisting (TV series) =

Norwegian police procedural television series

- Genre: Scandinavian noir; police procedural; thriller
- Created by: Trygve Allister Diesen; Kathrine Valen Zeiner
- Based on: The Caveman; The Hunting Dogs; The Inner Darkness; The Night Man by Jørn Lier Horst
- Written by: Vegard Steiro Amundsen<; Anne Elvedal; Kjersti Ugelstad; Trygve Allister Diesen; Kathrine Valen Zeiner; Jadranko Mehic
- Directed by: Trygve Allister Diesen; Katarina Launing; Henrik Georgsson
- Starring: Sven Nordin; Carrie-Anne Moss; Mads Ousdal; Thea Green Lundberg; Lars Berge
- Composers: Ole Bo; Jacob Groth; Sören Möller
- Country of origin: Norway
- Original languages: Norwegian; English
- No. of seasons: 5
- No. of episodes: 26

Production
- Executive producers: Julia Angelin<; Alexander Eik; Silje Hopland Eik; Anni Faurbye Fernandez; Jørn Lier Horst; Fredrik Ljungberg; Nanna Mailand-Mercado; Jakob Mejlhede; Matilde Nørgaard
- Producer: Terez Hollo-Klausen
- Cinematography: Linus Eklund; Jørgen Johansson; Ian N. Tomkins; Håvar Karlsen
- Editor: Sofia Lindgren
- Running time: 45 minutes
- Production companies: Cinenord; Good Company
- Budget: €12 million (Season 1)

Original release
- Network: Viaplay; TV3
- Release: April 11, 2019 – March 24, 2024

Wisting is a Norwegian police procedural television series, broadcast by Viaplay and TV3 starring Sven Nordin as William Wisting, a senior police detective in Larvik, Thea Green Lundberg as his daughter, crime journalist Line Wisting, and (until the third season) Carrie-Anne Moss as visiting FBI Special Agent Maggie Griffin.

== Production ==
The first series of ten episodes is based on two novels by Jørn Lier Horst, The Caveman (2013) and The Hunting Dogs (2012). Horst is a best-selling author in Norway, and his books have been translated into more than thirty languages. Filming started in January 2018 on a 150-day schedule. The adaptations were written by Trygve Allister Diesen and Kathrine Valen Zeiner. Diesen also directed episodes along with Katarina Launing. The show's first series had a budget of NOK 110 million (€11.4 million). This sum incorporated a €1 million grant from Creative Europe as well as a grant of NOK 26.05 million (€2.7 million) from the Norwegian Film Institute. This makes the show the most expensive drama ever produced in Norway.

The Scandinavian broadcast of the first series commenced in April 2019. In the US, the series was launched on December 18, 2019 via the Sundance Now streaming service. In the United Kingdom the series was acquired by BBC Four from Banijay Rights and commenced broadcasting on December 28, 2019, with two episodes being shown back-to-back each week for five weeks. The first series was issued on DVD and Blu-ray on April 27, 2021.

In late 2020 Wisting was renewed for a second series of eight episodes. For transmission, these were split into two four episode runs, sometimes referred to as Seasons 2 and 3. However some international broadcasters list both as Season 2. This series is based upon the novels The Inner Darkness (2019) and The Night Man (2009), broadcast in Scandinavia from December 26, 2021 and April 2022 respectively. Nordin, Ouadal, Berge and Lundberg reprise their roles across all eight episodes, with Moss providing off-screen voice in the first four episodes and returning in full for the second four. The series was broadcast on BBC4 in the UK from October 15, 2022 and Australia via SBS on Demand from February 24 and June 23, 2022 respectively.

Two further series were confirmed in 2023, with the third production/fourth broadcast series being an original story inspired by Horst's characters, and the fourth production/fifth broadcast to be based on Horst's novel Sak 1569 (A Question of Guilt). The fourth series started broadcasting in Norway on March 24, 2024 and in the UK on April 13, 2024. Season 5 followed on September 24 of that year.

== Reception ==
The Nordic press viewed the series favourably. Stavanger Aftenblad commented that it was "intricate and riveting", Jyllands-Posten called it "a sure winner" and Aftenposten praised its "nonstop momentum".

Writing in The Wall Street Journal, Dorothy Rabinowitz found the series "seamlessly woven" and "superbly layered".

Writing in The Guardian, Euan Ferguson described the series as "... the best Nord-noir ever. Since the last one. What did Scandinavian film-makers think they were ever doing, 80 years of existential angst and Death playing nihilist chess, before remembering: we have crime. Coal. Snow. Blood. Fire. Cheekbones. Let’s do that."

== Cast ==
Credits:

- Sven Nordin as William Wisting; Larvik police lead investigator
- Carrie-Anne Moss as Maggie Griffin; FBI Special Agent, seconded to William's team (Seasons 1—3)
- Thea Green Lundberg as Line Wisting: William's daughter, Verdens Gang journalist
- Jonas Strand Gravli/Fredrik Stenberg Ditlev-Simonsen as Thomas Wisting; William's son and Line's twin brother
- Mads Ousdal as Nils Hammer; police senior detective
- Lars Berge as Benjamin Fjeld; police detective
- Irina Eidsvold Tøien as Andrea Vetti; police chief (Season 1)
- Maria Bock as Agnes Kiil; police chief (Season 2—present)
- Evelyn Rasmussen Osazuwa as Veronica Rambøl; Agnes's assistant, who joins William's team (Season 2―present)
- Kjersti Sandal as Torunn Borg; William's deputy and temporary lead investigator (Seasons 1—2)
- Mads Sjøgård Pettersen as Tommy Kvanter; Line's ex-boyfriend
- Mariann Hole as Sissel; Nils's wife, a former drug addict
- Cato Skimten Storengen as Ruben Borg; Torunn's husband, Atle's father (Seasons 1—3)
- Heidi Goldmann as Bjørg Karin; policewoman (Seasons 1—3)

=== Season 1 ===
- Richie Campbell as John Bantham: FBI Special Agent, seconded to William's team, has one-night stand with Line
- Ulrikke Hansen Døvigen as Christine Thiis: police prosecutor
- Gard B. Eidsvold as Frank Robekk: retired police detective, Ellen's uncle
- Fridtjov Såheim as Philip Henden: lawyer; represents Vidar and, later, William
- Christoffer Staib as Vidar Haglund: convicted murderer, released after serving sentence
- Daniel Frikstad as Joachim Andresen: Dagbladet news reporter
- Ellen Dorrit Petersen as Hanne Kaupang: Linnea's over-protective mother
- Thea Sofie Loch Næss as Linnea Kaupang: wannabe model, Internet blogger
- Lasse Vermeli as Erik: VG photographer
- Jon Øigarden as Terje Nordbo: Chief Inspector, Independent Office for Police Conduct; investigates police role in Cecilia's case
- Amy Black Ndiaye as Maren: police detective
- Henrik Plau as Fredrik: Line's associate at VG
- Lars Bonnevie Hjort as Morten By: VG senior investigative journalist
- Lars Sørbø as Knut Frost: VG editor, Line's boss
- Sarah Francesca Brænne as Synnøve Brunvall: Line's school friend
- Kari Onstad Winge as Annie Nyhus: one of Viggo's correspondents
- Nils Jørgen Kaalstad as Magnus Kaupang: Linnea's father, construction worker
- Vidar Sandem as Fred Iversen: Viggo's contemporary, relocated to Denmark
- Helge Sveen as Finn Haber: former police crime scene investigator
- Sigurd Myhre as Danny Flom: photographer, Cecilia's ex-boyfriend
- Ola Otnes as Ole Linge p.k.a. Robert Godwin: American serial killer, posing as Viggo's contemporary
- Dagny Backer Johnsen as Cecilia Linde: model, murdered by Vidar
- Kirsti Eline Torhaug as Madelen Torell: Swedish woman, Jonas's ex-girlfriend
- Trond Høvik as Torgeir Roxrud: Jonas's friend
- Helene Angell as Isabell: Linnea's school friend
- Anders Rogg as Kåre: dockworker, Jonas's former friend
- Jakob Fort as Lars Petter Myhre: Linnea's fellow student

=== Season 2 (2A) / 3 (2B) ===
- Kyrre Hellum as Adrian Stiller: National Criminal Investigation Service (Kripos) agent; hunts Tom
- Hallvard Holmen as Idar Semmelmann: Oslo Vice squad, leads search for "The Other"
- Odin Waage as Tom Kerr: convicted killer, assisted by an accomplice ("The Other")
- Eindride Eidsvold as Claes Thancke ("The Other", Theo Dermann): Tom's lawyer, serial killer
- Rudy Claes as Nina Gullow: television producer, Line's new boss
- Ingeborg Raustøl as Suzanne Bjerke: asylum centre co-ordinator, Jens' ex-wife, Ingrid's best friend
- Sagal Saleh as Hanan: asylum centre resident, Layla's friend
- Adam Mamadou Bizokunda as Sammy Kibo: asylum centre resident, ex-child soldier
- Kjærsti Odden Skjeldal as Mona Mellberg: Tom's girlfriend, claims he's innocent
- Edvald Bang-Johansen as Atle Borg: Torunn's son
- Hedda Styrmoe Silberg as Jeanette: Mona's daughter
- Anderz Eide as Fredrik Molander: prison guard, Tom's liaison officer
- Gaute Boris Skjegstad as Floyd Thue: Red Cross worker, visited Tom in prison
- Stig Henrik Hoff as Johannes Norum: father of Tarjei (Tom's victim), welder
- Oddgeir Thune as Cato Dalen: neo-Nazi farmer, Tommy's friend
- Knut M. Damm as Peder Salomonsen: shopkeeper
- Luke Elliot as Alek Begi: America ex-soldier, deserter, drug and human trafficking mastermind
- Marika Vesce as Sunniva: Sissel's daughter, Sissel wants to regain custody
- Karine Dybvik as Frida Kvastmo: uniformed policewoman
- Assad Siddique as Hussain
- Louise Tofte Røiri as Melina: Cato's live-in girlfriend
- Martin Furulund as Johan Eskedal: farmer, Islamophobe
- Serhat Yildirim as Khaled Athari a.k.a. Noor Alem: former asylum centre resident, Sammy's friend, drug courier, later lives in Karlstad, Sweden
- Jesper Malm as Lennart Melander: Karlstad police inspector, liaises with William's team
- Eeman Hashmi as Layla Hassimi: 14-year-old asylum centre resident, drug courier, decapitated with her head left on a pole
- Herman Karlsen as Marvin: Johan's older son
- Haakon Karlsen as Erlend: Johan's younger son

=== Season 4 (3A) / 5 (3B) ===
- Rupert Evans as Andrew Greenwood, Clifford's father
- Andrea Bræin Hovig as Mai Greenwood, Clifford's mother
- Svein Sturla Hungnes as Olav Engdahl
- Smylie Bradwell as Clifford Greenwood
- Teddie Allen as Charlotte Greenwood
- Ellen Bendu as Rebekka Skjevik
- Emil Johnsen Vavik as Lukas
- Harald Ottesen Nødtvedt as Joakim Backer
- Shana Mathai as Rosa Garcia Backer
- Morten Svartveit as Stein Kvammen
- Shelley Conn as Harriet Dunn
- Ingjerd Egeberg as Kate Ulstrup
- Kristian Repshus as Daniel Momrak
- Ada Aure Albæk as Tone Vaterland
- Kristian Repshus as Daniel Momrak
- Lea Meyer as Agnete Kronborg
- William Gundersen as Peder Kronborg
- Øyvind Brandtzæg as Terje Kronorg
- Kikki Stormo as Mona Kronborg
- Jan Sælid as Bjørn Momrak
- Arthur Berning as Sivert
- Arnt Egil Andreassen as Christian Bohrmann
- Aleksander Varadian as Jarle Gulliksen
- Pekka Stang as Lennart Hök
- Cathrine Frost Andersen as Prison Andersen
- Nina Andreassen as Esther Momrak
- Olivija Eva Viliüné as Greta Valotka
- Arjan Nilsen as Erik Olsen
- Arvid Ones as Finn Haber: William's former colleague (n.b.: previously portrayed by Helge Sveen)
- Even Stormoen as Rune Kolseth
- Sebastian DeMots as David Kolseth

== Episodes ==
=== Season 1 (2019) ===
No. overall	No. in season	Title	Directed by	Written by	Based on	Original release date
1	1	"Episode 1"	Trygve Allister Diesen	Trygve Allister Diesen, Jørn Lier Horst, Kathrine Valen Zeiner	Hulemannen (The Caveman)	April 11, 2019
In mid-winter, Wisting's team recovers a corpse from beneath a tree on a farm. They collect hairs held in the corpse's hand and a ship’s brochure from his inside pocket. Wisting's daughter, Line, a journalist asks her editor whether she can write a story about the death of her father's neighbour Viggo, whose body was not discovered for several months. While Line is at the police station talking to her father a former policeman barges in, asking if the body is that of his niece Ellen. Wisting tells him it's a man. The police provide Line with Viggo's file and his door key. She visits his home and takes photos. She asks a colleague to draw up a list of Fredrik Viggo's contemporaries. The coroner performs an autopsy on the body. Wisting is notified that fingerprints on the brochure found in the dead man's pocket match those of a US serial killer Robert Godwin. Andrea warns the team: no information leaks about Robert's case. William searches the dead man's leased house; his belongings include newspaper clippings about Robert Godwin's killings. Line collects Viggo's postcards. William and Andrea welcome FBI investigators Maggie Griffin and John Bantham. DNA confirms the corpse is an American named Peter Crabb. Bantham explains Robert Godwin's Norwegian ancestry. Maggie describes Godwin as a "caveman" modus operandi: he gets close to someone and takes over their life after killing them. Godwin was a serial rapist and killer of mostly young blonde women, whose bodies he then hid in wells. Maggie agrees to add Ellen, the missing niece of an ex-policeman, as a possible Godwin victim. Meanwhile, Viggo's classmate identifies fellow members from a school photo for Line. Elsewhere, a young blonde named Sissel bangs on a locked door pleading to be let out.
2	2	"Episode 2"	Trygve Allister Diesen	Trygve Allister Diesen, Jørn Lier Horst, Kathrine Valen Zeiner	Hulemannen (The Caveman)	April 11, 2019
William's team sifts through missing persons' files for Robert's potential victims. Sissel wakes on her mattress; she screams to be let out. Synnøve recalls that Viggo died in late August; he was a loner. Maggie, Nils and Ben visit a potential suspect; however, Maggie discounts him. William asks John to first delve into Ellen's file. Maggie and Nils have fractious interactions. Annie describes Viggo's friends: Odd, Fred and Ole. Knut asks Line to check why local police ordered an autopsy. William ignores Line's calls. William consults Finn, who recognises the well location from Peter's photo. William shuns both Joachim and Line. Ole confirms Viggo's lonesomeness to Line. Line deduces that Viggo's corpse was not in his regular armchair. She asks Fredrik to recover a copy of the last TV show that Viggo watched. Nils feigns being ill and stays home. William is unconvinced by Line's hypothesis of Viggo's murder; insufficient evidence for an investigation. On the way to work, Nils berates a youth for smoking marijuana. William's team waits to access the well. William picks up Thomas from the airport. Nils looks for his phone. William confirms that Maggie can access the well; she finds no human remains. Nils views a live transmission of Sissel, who is locked in a room.
3	3	"Episode 3"	Trygve Allister Diesen	Trygve Allister Diesen, Jørn Lier Horst, Kathrine Valen Zeiner	Hulemannen (The Caveman)	April 18, 2019
Nils delivers Sissel's meal. William, Line and Thomas share breakfast. John lists 12 likely victims. When Vidar's released Frank waits outside. Line and Thomas visit their mother's grave. Benjamin points out that Robert could have Swedish victims. Line attends Viggo's funeral; fellow mourner Irene brushes off Line. Vidar reports Frank's stalking. William explains that Vidar was found guilty of Cecilia's murder but could not be linked to Ellen's disappearance. William warns Frank to leave Vidar alone. Line learns that Viggo wanted his locks changed. Sissel confirms that she wants to be locked up. Irene relates how Viggo had psychiatric care for delusion: he could no longer recognise a childhood friend. Joachim photographs Frank approaching Vidar. Joachim asks for William's confirmation of Peter's murder in exchange for not publishing Frank's photo. Maggie recalls that she released Robert due to insufficient evidence. Line meets Fred at a bar. Fred's friendship with Viggo ebbed out. Line rebuffs Fred's unwanted advances. John introduces himself to Line. Torunn finds Robert's ancestral property; Nils confirms Peter photographed its well. Nils admits he's helping Sissel through drug rehabilitation. Line takes Thomas into Viggo's home. William and Torunn ask new owners about their well. William's team remove the well's lid.
4	4	"Episode 4"	Trygve Allister Diesen	Trygve Allister Diesen, Jørn Lier Horst, Kathrine Valen Zeiner	Hulemannen (The Caveman)	April 25, 2019
William believes the skeleton is Robert's first Norwegian victim. Linnea fears someone's trailing her. Pathologist: the man's skeleton was 45 to 60 years old. Viggo visited the library; he ripped a 1971 photo of himself with Odd, Cato and Ole. Against William's orders, Maggie asks Benjamin to wear a body camera so Maggie can vet suspects. Odd refuses to answer when Line visits. Finn tells William that Philip revisited Cecilia's case. William determines property with Peter's corpse also has a well. Its lid was blocked by a large rock. Benjamin asks Linnea to return with a photo or licence plate number of her stalker. Line tells Annie she thinks someone murdered Viggo. Thomas has left. Line and William argue about William prioritising his work above his family. Line and John have sex. William joins Nils, Maggie and Benjamin at the well. Line sends John's FBI identity card photo to Knut. Torunn, John and Swedish policeman Bergquist view footage of the forensic team removing about 16 skeletons. VG publishes John's photo. Line's car breaks down. William stops Benjamin filming suspects. Synnøve tells William that she saw Viggo and Peter together. Line is subdued and kidnapped. John discovers that Line is William's daughter. Bjørg alerts William about Line's abandoned car.
5	5	"Episode 5"	Trygve Allister Diesen	Trygve Allister Diesen, Jørn Lier Horst, Kathrine Valen Zeiner	Hulemannen (The Caveman)	May 2, 2019
Ole drives the car with Line in the boot. William studies Line's investigation. Bergquist identifies a Swedish victim. Torunn describes Viggo's mental delusion. The investigative team sorts through Viggo's friends. William and Nils question Odd. Odd's fingerprints do not match Robert. Nils uses Line's phone, confirming she met John. Maggie rails at John for alerting Robert to the FBI presence. John identifies Fred. Fred runs off when he sees police at the ferry. Fred denies knowing Line. Annie recognises Fred: he's not Robert. Annie remembers Line spoke to Ole. Andrea confirms the search for Robert to press. Ole's car stalls, he walks off. Line escapes with hands tied; stumbles into the barn. She cuts off the cable ties and lights a kerosene lamp. Ole discovers Line is gone, and follows her trail. Maggie sees Ole's photo of cabin in Skåpafors, Sweden. William, Maggie and Bergquist travel by helicopter. Inside, Line sets the barn alight and climbs wall. Ole scales ladder near Line. William spots the barn afire. Line on barn roof with Ole peering out. Line slides down the roof to the ground. William jumps down. Ole picks up unconscious Line, and walks towards the well as William tackles Ole. Maggie shoots Ole. William throws Ole into well. William farewells Maggie. Thomas briefly returns to see Line.
6	6	"Episode 6"	Trygve Allister Diesen, Katarina Launing	Vegard Steiro Amundsen, Trygve Allister Diesen, Jørn Lier Horst	Jakthundene (The Hunting Dogs)	May 9, 2019
William us ambushed on a TV show by Philip's claim of evidence tampering during Vidar's investigation. Jonas walks his dog into Frogner Park, where he's struck and killed. Fredrik shows Line VG's front page story on William. Knut explains that William has the opportunity to defend himself. Knut directs Line to cover Jonas's murder. William updates Christine on Cecilia's case. Her corpse was found 12 days after she disappeared. Vidar is identified by a witness on Cecilia's running route; Vidar's DNA evidence on a cigarette found at the scene. Line asks a local vet about Jonas's dog. He checks the microchip for Jonas's address. Line approaches Jonas's door but a man injures Line, then runs off. Line writes about Jonas. A policeman takes Line to the hospital. Flashback: Cecilia runs along and passes a white car, then she is attacked. Present: Frank reiterates that Vidar is guilty of murder. Line is disappointed when Knut puts her article on page five. Philip addresses the media and reinforces the claims. Christine announces Terje's investigation is due. Andrea suspends William: Vidar's cigarette butt was planted. Linnea updates her blog; Hanne cautions her to remove provocative poses. Line's caught accessing Morten's computer. William makes copies of the archive files. Andrea promotes Torunn. William castigates Andrea for releasing Cecilia's audiotape, which provoked the kidnapper to kill Cecilia.
7	7	"Episode 7"	Trygve Allister Diesen	Vegard Steiro Amundsen, Trygve Allister Diesen, Jørn Lier Horst	Jakthundene (The Hunting Dogs)	May 16, 2019
Hanne discovers Linnea's gone. Journalists ask William why witnesses were ignored. Knut catches Line berating Morten for his story. Knut orders Line to focus on Jonas's murder. Torunn provides Torje with an office. William confirms that Cecilia's case was his first as lead investigator. Torje wants to find who tampered with the evidence. Erik photographs Jonas's phone log from the police file during a press conference. Torunn tries to allay Kaupang's concern for Linnea; she hands them over to Benjamin. William relocates to the family's cabin. Torunn's ovaries are checked for ovum production. William uses the cabin to reinvestigate Ceclia's case. Torgeir recalls Jonas's love of dogs and motorcycles; he had a former girlfriend. Sissel encourages Nils to help William where possible. William listens to Cecilia's audiotape. Line and Tommy update each other. William tells Nils about Aksel providing Vidar's alibi. Karsten, a farmer, who had identified Vidar from photos, was not told the suspect might not be present. Karen texts Benjamin the location of Linnea's friends. Nils becomes annoyed when William researches whether Nils made mistakes. Line invites Tommy to stay overnight. Isabell shows Benjamin: Linnea's social media message, implying she suicided. Nils recognises Farris lake. Nils and Benjamin find an abandoned boat with Linnea's sweater neatly folded.
8	8	"Episode 8"	Trygve Allister Diesen	Vegard Steiro Amundsen, Trygve Allister Diesen, Jørn Lier Horst	Jakthundene (The Hunting Dogs)	May 23, 2019
Police search the lake for Linnea's corpse. Hanne picks up Linnea's sweater. William returns home to recharge his laptop. He warns Tommy off. Line sees Tommy departing and scolds William for interfering. Kaupangs confirm police have Linnea's phone. Line updates Knut on research into Jonas, who had worked at Larvik's docks. Hanne tells Benjamin that Linnea did not fold clothing nor commit suicide. Frank believes Vidar took Linnea. Linnea's friends confirm she was messy. Dockworker Kåre describes Jonas's motorcycles and how Jonas transferred after Madelen left him. Linnea's counsellor describes her struggles with Hanne. William asks Torunn whether they checked Vidar regarding Linnea's disappearance. Terje infers that Nils ignored evidence tampering. Hanne's insulted when Benjamin asks about her arguments with Linnea. William is unable to search for Linnea on behalf of Kaupangs. William and Frank surveil Vidar. Andrea asks Torunn to rectify the situation after Kaupangs complain to the media. Vidar visits his father Karl, then leaves. Frank searches Karl's home for Linnea. William and Frank separate. Torunn and Nils apologise to Kaupangs. Knut puts Line on leave due to a poor report. Line reconciles with Tommy. Vidar suggests that William scrutinise his pre-trial visitors. Danny injures himself while viewing Linnea's picture.
9	9	"Episode 9"	Trygve Allister Diesen	Vegard Steiro Amundsen, Trygve Allister Diesen, Jørn Lier Horst	Jakthundene (The Hunting Dogs)	May 30, 2019
Police join Kaupangs' search. William asks Bjørg about archival visitor logs. Terje interviews Bjørg, who admits William contacted her. Danny claims not knowing Linnea. William confronts Frank over his photos of Line. Lars Petter recalls accompanying Linnea due to her fear of the stalker. William notices Terje's team scouring his cabin. Frank burns his files. Danny hides Linnea's professional portrait. William sneaks into police archives. Benjamin points out that Linnea's blog photos are all personalised, except the lake one. Nils ignores footage of William exiting the archives. Kåre informs Line of Madelen's surname. William finds that Jonas was interviewed about Ellen. William asks for Line's help to learn about Jonas. Jonas owned a red car of the same model as one used in Ellen's abduction. Madelen provided Jonas's alibi. Andrea announces that William was conducting unauthorised investigations. Line reveals to Madelen that Jonas was murdered. Hanne argued with Linnea over her provocative photos. Nils notices Danny took those photos. Danny lied to avoid scrutiny. Linnea wanted photos for her modelling agency. Nils has Benjamin tail Danny. Line and William find Torgeir's corpse. Attending police arrest William for interfering in police investigations. Benjamin prevents Magnus from attacking Danny. Linnea is imprisoned in a cell-like room.
10	10	"Episode 10"	Trygve Allister Diesen	Vegard Steiro Amundsen, Trygve Allister Diesen, Jørn Lier Horst	Jakthundene (The Hunting Dogs)	June 6, 2019
Linnea tries the locked door's lever. William is remanded; Philip gets him released on bail. Bjørg hands William an archive copy of Vidar's visitors. Madelen gives Jonas's envelope to Line. William has an evidence bag tested for fingerprints. Benjamin follows Danny to a factory. Line and William view Jonas' VHS recording of Cecilia imprisoned in a cell-like room. Flashback Cecilia scratches her name on the wall, it already has Ellen's name. Present: Danny knocks out Benjamin. Madelen recalls Jonas purchased an ex-military bunker to store motorbikes. Maren and Nils find Benjamin's car's GPS. Line confesses that Tommy took the blame for her amphetamine. Benjamin collects his gun and enters the building. Benjamin prevents Danny's hanging attempt until Nils and Maren arrive. Danny claims he only took photos. William and Line enter the bunker; Frank follows with his rifle. Frank opens a red car's boot; inside are Ellen's clothes. A corridor leads to a locked room where they find Linnea. Frank then reads Ellen's name on the wall. Vidar picks up Frank's gun and shoots him before running off. William then pursues Vidar and fights him until he is subdued. Meanwhile, Line calls the emergency services. William returns home. Andrea confirms Linnea's rescue and the investigation into Cecilia's case is ongoing. William records Andrea's admission of evidence tampering. The forensic team later finds Ellen's teeth.

=== Season 2/2A (2021) ===
No. overall	No. in season	Title	Directed by	Written by	Based on	Original release date
11	1	"Episode 1"	Trygve Allister Diesen	Vegard Steiro Amundsen, Trygve Allister Diesen, Jørn Lier Horst	Illvilje (The Inner Darkness)	December 26, 2021
Adrian supervises as Line films Tom, shackled, leaving his cell with two guards. Claes is present. Tom leads people towards Tarjei's remains. Claes requests his shackles be removed when crossing uneven terrain. Tom, suddenly free, runs downhill with Torunn and Benjamin closely pursuing. An explosion tears through the group. Line is knocked down while filming; Tom escapes. Injured Torunn and Benjamin are evacuated by ambulance. Adrian placed a tracker in Tom's boot, which shows Tom's location. Line films Adrian advising William and Nils to capture the accomplice when collecting Tom. Line updates Nina on Tom's escape and explosion. William asks Line to upload the film. William's strike force approaches Tom's cabin. Line reviews the footage, and sees Tom's handcuff key. Adrian describes how Tom's site visitation was organised via Claes's schedule. Tom's visitors included Mona. Idar provides evidence of the accomplice's victims. Benjamin updates William on Torunn's induced coma. Mona's surveillance shows her driving a van. William announces Tom's escape. Ruben and Atle visit Torunn. Agnes confirms two police officers were injured. Line leaves the press conference highly distressed. Tom's tracker is still inside cabin; Mona arrives nearby. The strike force enters the cabin. Police stop Mona; her dog lies inside. The cabin is empty except Tom's boots atop the cleaning robot. Line miscarries her foetus. Torunn dies.
12	2	"Episode 2"	Trygve Allister Diesen	Vegard Steiro Amundsen, Trygve Allister Diesen, Jørn Lier Horst	Illvilje (The Inner Darkness)	December 26, 2021
Benjamin notifies William of Torunn's death. Nils reports that Tom left by boat. The police team mourns Torunn. Agnes and Veronica describe Tom's local connections. Tom used a military stun grenade. Benjamin assaults Adrian over Torunn's death as Adrian knew of Tom's possible escape. Adrian does not press charges. Line returns to Tommy but she's restless. Adrian convinces Mona to provide addressee (Theo Dermann) of envelopes sent by Tom. Veronica reports that the name and address are faked. Fredrik describes Tom's behaviour. He advises William to check Claes. Veronica leads Mona out of the police station. Nina, despite Line's distress, wants to release Line's clips to news channels. William and Adrian interview Floyd, who claims he helped Tom better make use of his imprisonment. Benjamin reviews Line's film; Claes confers with Tom prior to leaving. Maggie sends her condolences to William. Claes showed information on Tom's house insurance claim. Claes met Theo, who threatened his niece; Claes handed Theo's envelope to Tom. Nils and Veronica question motorcyclist Jørgen about the grenades. Line reviews her footage where Tom offers to find Tarjei. Jørgen names a junkie, Aslak. Nils and Veronica discover Aslak's corpse. Line meets Mona who still defends Tom. Theo's envelopes contain blank paper. Tom visits Mona.
13	3	"Episode 3"	Trygve Allister Diesen	Vegard Steiro Amundsen, Trygve Allister Diesen, Jørn Lier Horst	Illvilje (The Inner Darkness)	December 26, 2021
Johannes complains about police ineptitude. Benjamin and Veronica surveil Mona's home. Nils checks Aslak's phone; he was killed last week. Jeanette, dressed as Mona, cycles away with Benjamin following. Mona's gone. Nils opens the grenade case: three of four are missing. Jeanette initially denies seeing Tom. Jeanette tells William they drove a white van. Line interviews a psychiatrist about Tom's accomplice. When Line returns home, Tommy is drunk. Line is shocked when her footage appears on TV. Nils discovers that Aslak contacted Johannes. Ruben accuses William of letting Tom escape to lure Tom's accomplice. Adrian denies leaking Line's film; he confirms Mona left with Tom. Johannes denies contacting Aslak. Veronica describes Johannes as quick to anger. Two white vans are reported: Benjamin and Veronica head to warehouse while William, Nils and Adrian go to Floyd's home. Veronica finds the padlock cut off, and they enter. Nils breaks into Floyd's home. Benjamin and Veronica discover the van, which is booby-trapped with a grenade; both are hospitalised and recover. William's team find Floyd practising bondage. Line films Tom's burned down home. She sees recent tyre tracks and a freshly dug grave. Agnes orders William and Nils home to sleep; Idar is appointed lead investigator. William recovers Tom's head from the grave.
14	4	"Episode 4"	Trygve Allister Diesen	Vegard Steiro Amundsen, Trygve Allister Diesen, Jørn Lier Horst	Illvilje (The Inner Darkness)	December 26, 2021
Line films Tom's body parts, which were dumped about 12 hours earlier. Forensics finds another corpse's hand wearing Mona's ring. William and Nils realise both Line and Claes are targets. Tommy arrives with Line's batteries and memory cards. Idar confiscates Line's camera due to previous material being leaked. Tommy had already palmed its memory card. William finds a welding glove, which Benjamin recognises as similar to Johannes's. William learns of Line's miscarriage. Johannes's boss tells police Johannes was fired for a loaded gun. Idar finds a grenade in Johannes's kitchen. Nina admits her assistant leaked footage. Nils discovers prison inmates' phones were used at Tom's burned home. During Mona's interview, she describes Tom divulging details to Claes. Idar arrested both inmates. William wants to check with Claes about Idar. Idar and Benjamin interrogate Johannes. Line and Tommy arrive at Claes's first home. They are followed by both Nils and Veronica. William talks with Claes at his second home. Nils and Veronica search the first home, where they discover chemicals and weaponry. Line warns William about Claes. Claes tasers William and drags him inside. William revives, now strapped to a chair. Claes places a plastic bag over William's head but William fights back and arrests Claes. Line completes her documentary.

=== Season 3/2B (2022) ===
No. overall	No. in season	Title	Directed by	Written by	Based on	Original release date
15	1	"Episode 1"	Trygve Allister Diesen	Vegard Steiro Amundsen, Trygve Allister Diesen, Jørn Lier Horst	Nattmannen (The Night Man)	April 22, 2022
Bookseller Vera rides her bicycle through the fog; she passes shopkeeper Peder in a wheelchair. Vera stops when she sees Layla's head on a pole. William has Torunn's effects, and sees Ruben and Atle leave home. William joins Nils and Benjamin at the crime scene. Layla is a west Asian teen female; no one with her description was reported missing. The forensic examiner places the head into an evidence bag. Tommy looks for accommodation while Line goes to Heyerdahl museum. Layla was killed hours before the impalement. Nina asks Line to investigate Layla's case. Benjamin views CCTV of Cato's car near the scene. William and Nils question Cato; Melina provides an alibi. Frida tells Line that Layla is a teen girl. Line sees Hanan trying to view the crime scene. Line visits Suzanne, who explains there is no one reported missing. Suzanne asks Hanan where Layla went. Maggie arrives in Larvik; she has been investigating unsolved decapitations in Europe. Line alerts William to Layla's absence. Benjamin and Veronica take Johan's statement about the stolen pole. Suzanne sobs over Layla's photo. Sammy explains to Line how people go missing from the centre. Layla's psychologist was Jens; he's also missing. Tommy introduces Line to Cato. Line describes her next documentary to Nina: missing under-age asylum seekers. Sissel meets Sunniva. A fisherman nets Jens's corpse. Layla's diary has "Night Man" erased.
16	2	"Episode 2"	Trygve Allister Diesen	Vegard Steiro Amundsen, Trygve Allister Diesen, Jørn Lier Horst	Nattmannen (The Night Man)	April 22, 2022
Suzanne identifies Jens's corpse. Suzanne does not know Layla's boyfriend and dismisses accusations of Jens's pedophilia. Line tells Tommy of her asylum centre project. Sissel wants to regain custody of Sunniva. Benjamin points out Layla's "Night Man" drawing depicting a severed head. Cato begs Peder to hide him but Peder refuses. Sammy gets an SMS: a buyer wants cannabis. Line learns that Khaled was taken from the centre. Line asks Suzanne if she could film interviews with residents. Suzanne explains Khaled was deported. Wisting and police ask to see Sammy. When police enter, Sammy brandishes his knife. Maggie disarms him; Nils handcuffs him while Line films them. Sissel watches Sunniva playing. Thomas explains to Line that Sammy was a child soldier. Sammy describes how Jens abused Layla; Sammy followed Jens to another house. Inside is Layla's corpse with two sets of boot prints and Jens's dog Ottar. William visits Line's new apartment. Nils tells Sissel that it may take years to get Sunniva back. Nils takes Ottar for a walk to the railway station. Thomas believes William and Suzanne had an affair. Maggie kisses William. Nils calls them to view CCTV of Layla's suitcase being stolen and discarded. William, Maggie and Nils discover drug packages.
17	3	"Episode 3"	Trygve Allister Diesen	Vegard Steiro Amundsen, Trygve Allister Diesen, Jørn Lier Horst	Nattmannen (The Night Man)	April 22, 2022
Marvin takes a handgun from a box, brandishing it at Erlend. Marvin accidentally shoots Johan. Johan blames a "Muslim" but William asks Marvin and locates the handgun. Benjamin confirms Cato stole a similar gun. Line asks Suzanne why Ingrid left but is referred to William. William and Nils find Layla's backpack at Cato's. Tommy surprises Cato who initially chokes Tommy. Cato asks Tommy for his gun. Hanan describes how Khaled brought drugs from Sweden. Line berates William for his affair with Suzanne. Tommy teaches Line how to shoot. William discovers Alek's file in Maggie's office. Maggie details Alek's background but asks William not to inform his team. Veronica discovers Cato's corpse; made to look like an overdose. Sissel takes Sunniva home after seeing her bullied by other children. Melina admits that Cato stole guns and he overslept when he should have collected Layla's suitcase. Tommy informs Line of Cato's death. She asks whether Cato was dealing drugs. Maggie reveals Khaled lives in Karlstad. Line interviews Sammy about Cato. William and Maggie liaise with Lennart, and bring Suzanne to meet Khaled. Alek hijacks Line's car when she drives Sammy. Alek wants Sammy as a hostage in return for his impounded drugs. Line shoots Alek.
18	4	"Episode 4"	Trygve Allister Diesen	Vegard Steiro Amundsen, Trygve Allister Diesen, Jørn Lier Horst	Nattmannen (The Night Man)	April 22, 2022
Line escapes with Sammy. Nils informs William that Alek attacked Line. Nils explains to Line that Ingrid had an affair with Jens. Veronica determines that Cato's boss was Peder. Forensics find no evidence of Jens and Layla's sexual activity. William surmises that Layla hid with Jens. Khaled seeks Norwegian residency. After Maggie shows photos of Layla's beheading, Khaled agrees to take them to a Gothenburg apartment, where Alek gave him a suitcase to deliver. Khaled recognises the apartment's owner but it's already empty. Maggie prevents the gunmen from killing Khaled. William and others return to Larvik. Nils updates them on Peder. Maggie surmises he's Alek's local contact. William and Line reconcile. Peder arrives at the police station, claiming he's not a drug dealer. William notices that Suzanne and Peder use similar language about narcotics. Line confesses to Tommy that she's afraid to have children. Khaled does not recognise Peder. Line films Layla's funeral. Nils and Veronica take confiscated drugs towards Oslo. Alek and Man stop them but armed police surround them. Man surrenders but Alek raises his rifle at Maggie and is killed by a police sniper. Suzanne had worked for Peder to provide drug mules. Tommy leaves Line. William returns Torunn's effects to Ruben.

=== Season 4/3A (2024) ===
In some international broadcasts, season 4 was screened as season 3, and seasons 2-3 were shown together as season 2.

No. overall	No. in season	Title	Directed by	Written by	Based on	Original release date
19	1	"Episode 1"	Henrik Georgsson	Vegard Steiro Amundsen, Jørn Lier Horst, Tomas Solli	Jørn Lier Horst's characters	March 24, 2024
20	2	"Episode 2"	Henrik Georgsson	Vegard Steiro Amundsen, Jørn Lier Horst, Tomas Solli	Jørn Lier Horst's characters	March 24, 2024
21	3	"Episode 3"	Henrik Georgsson	Vegard Steiro Amundsen, Jørn Lier Horst, Tomas Solli	Jørn Lier Horst's characters	March 24, 2024
22	4	"Episode 4"	Henrik Georgsson	Vegard Steiro Amundsen, Jørn Lier Horst, Tomas Solli	Jørn Lier Horst's characters	March 24, 2024

=== Season 5/3B (2024) ===
Season 5 of four episodes was screened in some markets as the last four episodes of Season 3.
