= Plau =

Plau may refer to:

- Urokinase
- Plau am See, Germany
  - Plau am See (Amt)
- Pław, Poland
- Henrik Plau (born 1988), Norwegian actor

== See also ==
- Plaus
