= Verdensteatret =

- Formation: 1986
- Type: Theatre group
- Location: Norway
- Website: www.verdensteatret.com

Verdensteatret is a hybrid performance art company based in Norway.

In 1986 Lisbeth Bodd and Asle Nilsen founded Verdensteatret, a collective of artists from different fields who collaborate to stage pieces which combine performance, installation, shadow-play, sound and animation. Using mostly found and repurposed material (they use the word "flotsam") like driftwood, wire, bicycle parts and bones, they use both computers and live actors to create audiovisual concerts. For example, their 2008 show Louder combined robotics, videography, music and shadow-play to create a dreamlike journey through the Mekong Delta. In 2006 Concert for Greenland won a Bessie Award in the category Performance, Installation, and New Media "for building exquisite links between seemingly incompatible technologies and materials-robots, video, piano, driftwood, and computers; for sharing their succinctly visualized yet beautifully ambivalent relationship to hidden landscapes; and for offering a poetically and emotionally evocative soundscape of a far-off place...," according to the jury statement. Concert for Greenland was performed at P.S. 122 (Performance Space 122) in New York.

Verdensteatret was awarded the Hedda Award Honorary Award in 2014. They were awarded the Hedda Award for Best Audiovisual Design in 2015 for their production "Broen over gjørme" ("Bridge Over Mud"). They received the 2014-2015 Norwegian Critics' Association Award for "Broen over gjørme" ("Bridge Over Mud") as well.

== Production history ==
- Hannah (2017)
- Broen over Gjørme (2014)
- And All the Questionmarks Started to Sing (2010)
- Louder (2008)
- Fortellerorkestret (2005/06)
- Concert for Greenland (2003/05)
- Tsalal (2001/02)
- Régla (2000/01)
- Faust/Massnamhe (1998)
- Philoktetes (1996/97)
- Orfeo (1995)
