= Lagerkvist =

Lagerkvist, Lagerqvist or Lagerquist is a Swedish surname. Notable people with the surname include:

- Pär Lagerkvist (1891–1974), Swedish author
- Claes-Ingvar Lagerkvist (born 1944), Swedish astronomer
- Margareta Sofia Lagerqvist (1771–1800), Swedish opera singer and stage actress
- Anna Lagerquist (born 1993), Swedish handball player
- David Lagerquist, editor-in-chief of CLOAD Magazine

== Fictional characters ==
- Petra Johanna Lagerkvist, a fictional character from the video game series Arcana Heart

== See also ==
- 2875 Lagerkvist, a main-belt asteroid
