= Chromasette =

Computer Magazine

Chromasette was the first cassette-based TRS-80 Color Computer magazine produced by David Lagerquist and was an offshoot of CLOAD magazine. The first issue was published July 1981 and the last issue was published in July 1984. Issues were published monthly. It was headquartered in Santa Barbara, California.

While some references cite the price as having been US$3.50 an issue, it was advertised in Creative Computing magazine in May 1983 as $45 a year for 12 issues, $25 for 6 issues, or $5 each. The first issue contained 5 Basic programs and the "cover" of the electronic magazine (which had to be loaded onto a TRS-80 Color Computer and then run) was dynamic. Included with each cassette was a 5-6 page newsletter explaining the programs included on the cassette, including their PMODE and PCLEAR values (if needed), their locations on tape, and several paragraphs of documentation about each (sometimes suggesting program alterations that change or improve the results). The newsletter contained tips, rumors (for example whether the TRS-80 Color Computer would soon support 5 1/4" floppy diskette drives in addition to cassettes for loading and recording software programs), along with other insights. They contained a variety of information about the Color Computer and some of the hardware and software available for it. In addition, they included advertisements. Dave signed only his first name to the CLOAD and Chromasette letters.

== How cassettes were produced ==
(from comment from David Lagerquist in the April 1983 issue)

"How do we duplicate the 6000 or so cassettes we send out each month? Rose just doesn't sleep! Really, the programs are read off a disk and sent through a line amplifier to 30 cassette recorders hooked up in parallel. The recorders are controlled by a Color Computer through the microphone jack. The 'random' clicking of 30 buttons lets us know that the tapes are done and that it's time to put in some more blank ones. A heck of a way to make a living..."

== Issues ==
The following is an incomplete listing of files included in Chromasette issues.

=== July 1981 ===
- COVER BAS 0 B 3
- HOWFAR BAS 0 B 4
- BLOCKADE BAS 0 B 3
- ACUMEN BAS 0 B 3
- DISRTATN BAS 0 B 3
- BLAST BAS 0 B 3

=== August 1981 ===
- HORNCOV BAS 0 B 2
- DRAWINST BAS 0 B 3
- DRAWER BAS 0 B 3
- WORDS BAS 0 B 3
- JERUSADV BAS 0 B 4
- LANDER BAS 0 B 3
- TWODATES BAS 0 B 2

=== September 1981 ===
- NERVES BAS 0 B 2
- SPELLIT BAS 0 B 3
- BASEGUES BAS 0 B 3
- HICALC BAS 0 B 3
- MUSICPAT BAS 0 B 2
- SEEKCOVR BAS 0 B 3

=== October 1981 ===
- COVER124 BAS 0 B 2
- MAGICSQR BAS 0 B 2
- MCJUMP BAS 0 B 3
- COEFF BAS 0 B 2
- TOWERINS BAS 0 B 1
- TOWER BAS 0 B 2
- PHONEWRD BAS 0 B 1

=== November 1981 ===
- TURKCOV BAS 0 B 3
- STAREATR BAS 0 B 2
- UFOMATH BAS 0 B 2
- MORSINST BAS 0 B 1
- MORSQUIZ BAS 0 B 4
- REVERSI BAS 0 B 2

=== December 1981 ===
- GRAPHCOV BAS 0 B 3
- DOGSTARS BAS 0 B 2
- BASECONV BAS 0 B 2
- AMORT BAS 0 B 2
- POUNCE BAS 0 B 1
- ROTATE BAS 0 B 1
- FIGURE DAT 1 A 3
- WORLDMAP BAS 0 B 4

=== January 1982 ===
- LINESCOV BAS 0 B 2
- BLOCK BAS 0 B 2
- TYPING BAS 0 B 2
- MANSION BAS 0 B 4
- POWER BAS 0 B 3
- WORLD3D BAS 0 B 4

=== February 1982 ===
- MOIRECOV BAS 0 B 1
- BLEEP BAS 0 B 2
- DUMPALL BAS 0 B 3
- ABM BAS 0 B 3
- DISASSEM BAS 0 B 3
- SHRINK BIN 2 B 1
- CHECKREG BAS 0 B 4
- SPIRAL BAS 0 B 2
- MINMUSIC BAS 0 B 1
- AMAZING BAS 0 B 2
- ADDRESS BAS 0 B 3
- OLDHOUSE BAS 0 B 5
- CKMON BIN 2 B 1

=== March 1982 ===
- POLYCOV BAS 0 B 2
- RUBIC BAS 0 B 5
- BOBO BAS 0 B 3
- SPACE BAS 0 B 2
- FINANCE BAS 0 B 3
- LAZKEY BIN 2 B 1
- MANYBODY BAS 0 B 1
- BLOTCH BAS 0 B 2
- RADAR BAS 0 B 3
- NOTEBOOK BAS 0 B 1
- NOTEDESC BIN 2 B 5
- ULTIMATE BAS 0 B 5
- APPEND BAS 0 B 2

=== April 1982 ===
- POLYCOV BAS 0 B 2
- RUBIC BAS 0 B 5
- BOBO BAS 0 B 3
- SPACE BAS 0 B 2
- FINANCE BAS 0 B 3
- LAZKEY BIN 2 B 1
- MANYBODY BAS 0 B 1

=== May 1982 ===
- BLOTCH BAS 0 B 2
- RADAR BAS 0 B 3
- HELLO BAS 0 B 2
- NOTEBOOK BAS 0 B 1
- NOTEDESC BIN 2 B 5
- ULTIMATE BAS 0 B 5
- APPEND BAS 0 B 2

=== June 1982 ===
- FIRECOV BAS 0 B 2
- MARTIAN BAS 0 B 2
- FINDIT BAS 0 B 3
- STRING BAS 0 B 1
- SCRAMBLE BAS 0 B 5
- DISKEDIT BAS 0 B 4
- SPACEACE BIN 2 B 2

=== July 1982 ===
- GEOCOV BAS 0 B 3
- STARMAP BAS 0 B 3
- TICKER BAS 0 B 3
- ROCKS BAS 0 B 3
- NOTES BAS 0 B 3
- MUSICK BAS 0 B 1
- MENU BAS 0 B 2

=== August 1982 ===
- MUSICCOV BAS 0 B 3
- CHICKEN BAS 0 B 2
- EQUATION BAS 0 B 2
- NAUGAINS BAS 0 B 3 (Realm of Nauga instructions)
- NAUGA BAS 0 B 4 (Realm of Nauga)
- MAXIMUM BAS 0 B 4
- DISDEMO BAS 0 B 3
- CLOCK BAS 0 B 1

=== September 1982 ===
- BOXCOV BAS 0 B 2
- PICKEM BAS 0 B 3
- WILLADV BAS 0 B 5
- TYPETUTR BAS 0 B 4
- TAPEINV BAS 0 B 3
- BASICMAP BAS 0 B 3
- GERM BIN 2 B 1

=== October 1982 ===
- CLASSCOV BAS 0 B 4
- ASTROINS BAS 0 B 2
- ASTROMIN BAS 0 B 3
- ROLL BAS 0 B 3
- BEAMS BAS 0 B 4
- CATALOG BAS 0 B 2
- SAY&PLAY BAS 0 B 6
- PONG BIN 2 B 1

=== November 1982 ===
- TEXCOV BAS 0 B 2
- MORAINE BAS 0 B 3
- LIFE BAS 0 B 3
- DIGGEM BAS 0 B 3
- CRAZMAZE BAS 0 B 2
- SMALTEXT BAS 0 B 3
- GRAFTEXT BAS 0 B 4
- PIANO BIN 2 B 1

=== December 1982 ===
- XMASCOV BAS 0 B 3
- MRMUNCH BAS 0 B 4
- ROBOTRUN BAS 0 B 3
- KALIEDOS BAS 0 B 2
- CURVEINS BAS 0 B 4
- CURVEFIT BAS 0 B 4
- HISCORE BAS 0 B 2
- BOXSHOOT BIN 2 B 2

=== January 1983 ===
- PLANCOV - Planner Cover
- LEAKYTAP - Leaky Tap
- HOUSEADV - House Adventure
- KEEPTEXT - Keep Text
- INST1 - Instructions Part 1
- INST2 - Instructions Part 2
- ROWBOAT - Rowboat
- LISTMOD - ListMod

=== February 1983 ===
- FLAGCOV - Flag Cover
- STELLINS - Stellar Instructions
- STELLEMP - Stellar Empire
- SORTS - Sorts
- BAR - Bar Chart
- XY - XY Graph
- DISKAID - Disk Aid (disk only)
- FLYBY - Flyby

=== March 1983 ===
- BIRDCOV BAS 0 B 3
- MICROBE BAS 0 B 3
- UTOPIAN BAS 0 B 4
- TAX BAS 0 B 6
- PIE BAS 0 B 3
- LANGINS BAS 0 B 2
- LANGDRL BAS 0 B 3
- SPANISH DAT 1 A 1
- FLYBY BIN 2 B 2

=== April 1983 ===
- TARTCOV BAS 0 B 2
- FOOL BAS 0 B 1
- RESCUINS BAS 0 B 2
- RESCUE BAS 0 B 4
- FILES BAS 0 B 4
- ASTBLAST BAS 0 B 3
- PENIPEDE BIN 2 B 2
- VARMAP BAS 0 B 3

=== May 1983 ===
- DESCOVER BAS 0 B 2
- BALLOONS BAS 0 B 3
- ANDREA BAS 0 B 5
- KEEPADDR BAS 0 B 3
- MAZE BAS 0 B 2
- GREMLML BIN 2 B 2
- GREMLIN BAS 0 B 2
- DELETER BIN 2 B 1

=== June 1983 ===
- GUTSCOV BAS 0 B 3
- BOUNBABY BAS 0 B 2
- MATHINS BAS 0 B 3
- MATHVADE BAS 0 B 3
- KEEPLIST BAS 0 B 3
- ZAPEM BAS 0 B 4
- REVERSE BAS 0 B 1
- FILECOPY BAS 0 B 1

=== July 1983 ===
- COLORCOV BAS 0 B 3
- COVERUP BAS 0 B 2
- FLIGHT BAS 0 B 2
- HALL BAS 0 B 3
- PRECOMP BAS 0 B 2
- ADDRESS PRE 0 A 3
- ADDCASS BAS 0 B 2
- ZEROG BIN 2 B 2
- LISTER BIN 2 B 1

=== August 1983 ===
- DOTCOVER BAS 0 B 2
- MOONFLT BAS 0 B 2
- CASTLADV BAS 0 B 6
- COLORINS BAS 0 B 2
- COLORDOT BAS 0 B 3
- KEEPCHEK BAS 0 B 3
- TRKLOC BAS 0 B 2
- GRID BIN 2 B 2
- MLSCORE BIN 2 B 1

=== September 1983 ===
- XFORMCOV BAS 0 B 3
- TRAILS BAS 0 B 3
- FACTORS BAS 0 B 4
- BLAKINS BAS 0 B 4
- BLAKJAK BAS 0 B 4
- KEEPBUDG BAS 0 B 3
- DIRSAVE BAS 0 B 2
- ANALYZE BIN 2 B 1

=== October 1983 ===
- MARTNCOV BAS 0 B 3
- QUICK BAS 0 B 2
- CHICK BAS 0 B 3
- TUTOCAT BAS 0 B 4
- CARDCAT BAS 0 B 4
- ISLEADV BAS 0 B 5
- OFFSET BAS 0 B 2
- NEWTRACE BIN 2 B 1

=== November 1983 ===
- FIGURCOV BAS 0 B 3
- TIMEFLT BAS 0 B 3
- ASSMBLER BAS 0 B 5
- ASMTEST DAT 2 B 1
- RADRUN BAS 0 B 2
- MASTRCAT BAS 0 B 4
- TRSMEM BAS 0 B 1
- ANIHLTR BIN 2 B 3

=== December 1983 ===
- FROSTCOV BAS 0 B 4
- FLIP BAS 0 B 3
- QBEE BAS 0 B 4
- DSKTODSK BAS 0 B 2
- CLUES BAS 0 B 2
- BOUNCER BIN 2 B 2
- FOREST BIN 2 B 3

=== January 1984 ===
- OPARTCOV BAS 0 B 3
- TAX83 BAS 0 B 5
- STAYLIV BAS 0 B 2
- STARMUSS BAS 0 B 5
- FORTRAN BAS 0 B 4
- FORDEMO FOR 1 A 1
- HELP DAT 1 A 2
- CLIMB BIN 2 B 3

=== February 1984 ===
- SCALECOV BAS 0 B 2
- CANNON BAS 0 B 3
- AUTODOC BAS 0 B 2
- STRKINS BAS 0 B 4
- COCOSTRK BAS 0 B 4
- BLAZER BAS 0 B 3
- WIGWORM BIN 2 B 2

=== March 1984 ===
- SHUTCOV BAS 0 B 3
- MATCH4 BAS 0 B 4
- COUNT BAS 0 B 4
- PILOT BAS 0 B 3
- \*SAMPLE DAT 1 A 1
- SAMPLE BAS 1 A 1
- TAIPAN BAS 0 B 6
- COLRDUMP BAS 0 B 2
- EZSKI BIN 2 B 2

=== April 1984 ===
- CLOCKCOV BAS 0 B 3
- PUZZROLL BAS 0 B 5
- BUDGET BAS 0 B 3
- LUNARADV BAS 0 B 6
- DRIVER BIN 2 B 1
- ABLE BIN 2 B 2
- MAZELAND BIN 2 B 2
