= Association of Norwegian Theatres and Orchestras =

The Association of Norwegian Theatres and Orchestras (Norwegian: Norsk teater- og orkesterforening, NTO) is an employers' organisation in Norway for theatre and symphony orchestra institutions.

== Organization ==
It was founded in 1962 as the Association of Norwegian Theatres (De norske teatres forening), an association for theatre institutions. Its name was changed after symphony orchestras were included in the organisation from 1989. The organisation has 42 member bodies. The member bodies are generally members of Arbeidsgiverforeningen Spekter as well. This way the member bodies follow the trade and tariff agreements of Spekter, but negotiate with their relevant trade unions through the Association of Norwegian Theatres and Orchestras. The Association of Norwegian Theatres and Orchestras is itself a member body of the Performing Arts Employers Associations League Europe. Hans Heiberg was chairman from 1962 to 1964. Arnljot Strømme Svendsen chaired the association for 22 years, from 1970 to 1992. The current director general is Morten Gjelten, and chairman of the board is Bernt Bauge.

The association awards the Hedda Award. Their headquarters are located in Storgata near Oslo Cathedral. The association is co-publisher of the online magazine Scenekunst.no, together with the association for independent theatre groups, the Norwegian Association for Performing Arts. NTO earlier issued the paper magazine Scenen.

== Statistics and documentary work ==
From 1987 to 1994 De norske teatres forening published an annual yearbook, containing a detailed record of productions and performances on Norwegian stages. The yearbook listed production details such as names of stage directors, set designers, actors and technical staff, date of first night, and number of performances. In 1986 the association represented thirteen subsidized theatres (including Den Norske Opera), which showed a total number of 4,800 performances for 1,130,000 spectators. In 1993 the association represented twenty subsidized theatres and six symphonic orchestras. The theatres had a total number of 353 productions, and the 7,600 performances were viewed by 1,490,000 spectators. In addition to the institutional theatres, the yearbook covered theatre productions for Radio and Television, and by independent professional groups (134 productions listed for 1993).
