= Nina Ellen Ødegård =

Norwegian actress (born 1979)

- Born: 2 November 1979 (age 46); Stavanger, Norway
- Occupation: Actress
- Awards: Hedda Award

Nina Ellen Ødegård (born 2 November 1979 in Stavanger) is a Norwegian actress.

== Biography ==
Born in Stavanger on 2 November 1979, Ødegård made her stage debut at Rogaland Teater in 2002 in a play by Brian Friel. Among her films are Play from 2003 and Alt for Egil from 2004. Her role as "Josie" in O'Neill's play Måne for livets stebarn in 2005 earned her the Hedda Award for best stage performance.
