= Trine Wiggen =

Norwegian actress (born 1968)

- Born: Trine Amalie Wiggen; 22 February 1968
- Occupation: Actor
- Awards: The Hedda Award for Best Actress (2010)

Trine Amalie Wiggen Kramhøft (born 22 February 1968) is a Norwegian actress. For her stage work she has won one Hedda Award.

== Career ==
Wiggen hails from Stjørdal Municipality. She graduated from the Gothenburg Ballet Academy in 1989 and the National Academy of Theatre in 1994. Following employments at Den Nationale Scene and Oslo Nye Teater, she joined the ranks at Nationaltheatret in 1998.

Wiggen was nominated for the Hedda Award for best female lead in 2006, for her role as Una in Blackbird, before winning the same award in 2010, having played Valerie Solanas in Sara Stridsberg's Valerie Solanas skal bli president i Amerika.

Wiggen's début on the big screen premiered in 2005. Wiggen's film roles include An Enemy of the People (2005), Kissed by Winter (2005), Bitter Flowers (2007) and The Man Who Loved Yngve (2008), whereas her television credits include The Third Eye (2014–16), Kampen for tilværelsen (2014–2015) and Mammon (2014–16).

== Personal life ==
Wiggen married Danish writer Janus Kramhøft.

Awards
Preceded by Birgitte Victoria Svendsen	Hedda Award for Best Actress; 2010	Succeeded by Heidi Gjermundsen Broch
