= Baktruppen =

Norwegian artist collective

Baktruppen was an artist collective from 1986 to 2011 that was founded in Bergen, Norway. The group had a substantial impact on European live art.

The performative work of Baktruppen consisted of theatre and dance performances, performance art, invisible theatre, video art, radio programs, sound art, site specific art, and politically motivated actions.

Theatre historian Knut Ove Arntzen in the book Performance Art by Baktruppen, first part (kontur 2009) explains: "Baktruppen is known for their irony and playing with avantgardistic approaches to theatre and performance art. They may even be perceived as having transgressed the avant-garde!" The name of the company means the opposite of avant-garde, something like “rear troop,” or somebody walking behind a military advancement. Because the troupe is avant garde, the name was ironic. Baktruppen's point was to recycle aspects of the classical avant-garde in a postmodern perspective, which was their point of departure.

Baktruppen was marked by artistic research going beyond the aesthetics and towards a social space. Baktruppen questioned the idea of ritual in theatre, and introduced the ambient space with a playful and ironic approach to the postmodern. Play became a frame for communication with the audience, and a point of departure for a deconstructivist view of the world expressed through their art. Notions of "professionalism" and "dilettantism" were questioned. One of the main intentions was that people joining productions should mix their talents and skills into a non-hierarchical working process of a collective kind.

Exaggeration and confusion are aspects that characterise Baktruppen's work. The troupe constantly positioned itself in the uncertain gap between the known and the unknown and operated with a dual awareness where they toyed with the distinctions between play/seriousness, fiction/reality, center/periphery, and different identities. One may say that Baktruppen's work reflects the carnivalesque in a postmodern form.

== Selected works ==
- FIRST WAFFLE, THEN MORALITY (2010)

On Friday Baktruppen buried the dog. Sunday before mass the church dug it up again. God knows where it is now. Witte de With Center for Contemporary Art, Rotterdam / Netherlands.

- BAKTRÜPPEN LIGHT METAL BAND (2009)

Baktruppen as Viking daoists of europunk talking about the 2008 financial crisis. Stamsund International Theatre Festival / Norway, Hanoi Sound Stuff-Greener Music Festival /Vietnam, Van Ho Exhibition Center / Vietnam. Asia Tour (2008): Happy Monday, Bangkok / Thailand, Night and Day / Singapore, Velvet Underground, Taipei / Taiwan, Dreamer House, Xiamen/ China, Ninliho Gallery, Foshan/ China, MoCa Space, Shenzhen Museum of Contemporary Art / China, Oxwarehouse, Macao / China. Storåsfestival / Norway.

- BAKKANALEN (2008)

Baktruppen presented Bakkanale crew and Baktrüppen Light Metal Band in an eighteen Man Band Baktruppen Forever Show. New and new versions of Baktruppen Performances: Germania Tod in Berlin, Tonight, When We Dead Awake, Come On Everybody, Good Good Very Good & Super-Per. Black Box Theatre, Oslo. Co-producer: Black Box. Org. Baktruppen.

- BAKTRUPPEN EVALUATION TEAM (2008)

European Centre for the Arts Hellerau, Dresden. In order to measure and increase the value of the festival as a whole, BAKTRUPPEN EVALUATION TEAM created a Money Pool. The audience was asked to help us find the Gross Artistic Product (GAP) by giving one € to one of the 22 performances. Then Baktruppen levered this value by 10 and painted a piece of the diagram blue. To color the pool and to help them choose, thereby making the GAP grow, we gave resymées from the 21 other performances, and spoke about money matters, our universal unit of measurement. All in all, the audience gave €99, triggering €990 from Baktruppen, which make a GAP of €1.089, the sum total given back to the festival.

- THE YEAR OF THE BUSH (2006)

Celebrating The Year of The Bush. Dælenenggata 31, Oslo / Norway.

- UN-DO-THREE (2005)

Third part of Baktruppen's dance trilogy. Developed at Kampnagel, Hamburg / Germany. Continental Breakfast Tallinn- NU Performance Festival, Tallinn / Estonia.

- DARIO FO'S CORPS FOR SALE (2005)

Baktruppen cancel their jubilee show about Norway and play instead Dario Fo's Corps For Sale. Karlstad Stadsteater, Karlstad / Sweden, Kulturhuset Stockholm / Sweden, Ålesund Theatre Festival / Norway, Black Box Theatre, Oslo / Norway, Teaterhuset Avantgarden, Trondheim / Norway, BIT- Teatergarasjen, Bergen / Norway.

- DELIA COMMEDIA (2004)

Steirischer Herbst, Graz / Austria. PS 122, New York /USA, Nordic Excellence, Gothenburg Dance and Theatre Festival / Sweden, Nuffield Theatre, Lancaster / UK, Bowen West Theatre, Bedford / UK, Black Box Theatre, Oslo / Norway, CCA, Glasgow / Scotland, Rui Hortas Centro Coreográfico de Montemor-o-Novo / Portugal, Dansens Dag, Moderna Dansteatern, Stockholm / Sweden, Nordic Excellence, Kulturhuset, Stockholm / Sweden. Co-producer: Autonnale Bergen Contemporary Music Festival. Rui Hortas Centro Coreográfico de Montemor – o Novo /Portugal.

- STAMSUND GALLUP POLL (2004)

As a result of the poll a two and a half meter tall wooden sculpture made by Baktruppen was given to the people in Stamsund to decide its name and if they wanted it to stand ON LAND or be thrown IN THE OCEAN. The sculpture was wanted ON LAND by 95% and was named THE TOURIST. Coastal Ferry Quay, Stamsund, Lofoten / Norway.

- FUNNY SORRY JESUS (2003)

Bread, red wine and Jesus. Rosa Luxemburg strasse 24, Berlin / Germany Org.: Sophiensæle Kunstbanken, Hamar / Norway, BIT – Teatergarasjen, Teatergaten, Bergen / Norway, Teaterhuset Avantgarden, Trondheim / Norway, Dæhlenenggata, Oslo / Norway, Tou Scene, Stavanger / Norway, Limelight, Kortrijk / Belgium.

- FUNNYSORRY (2002)

Modernism, fossils, Adam&Eve. Dælenenggata 31, Oslo / Norway.

- DO & UNDO (2002)

Baktruppen do and undo knots and unknots during three entrances, two exits and one turning point. Steirischer Herbst, Graz / Austria, PS 122, New York /USA, Nordic Excellence, Gothenburg Dance and Theatre Festival / Sweden, Nuffield Theatre, Lancaster / UK, Bowen West Theatre, Bedford / UK, Black Box Theatre, Oslo / Norway, CCA, Glasgow / Scotland, Nordic Excellence, Kulturhuset, Stockholm / Sweden. Autonnale / BIT – Teatergarasjen, Bergen / Norway, Uganda National Theatre, Kampala / Uganda, Perfect Performance Festival, Stockholm / Sweden, Parkteateret, Oslo / Norway, Stamsund International Theatre Festival / Norway, Kunstbanken, Hamar / Norway, Limelight, Kortrijk / Belgium, Montemor-o-Novo Theatre, City Hall / Portugal, Norwegian Touring Exhibitions, Morokulien, border of Norway/Sweden. Co-producer: Autonnale Bergen Contemporary Music Festival. Rui Hortas Centro Coreográfico de Montemor – o Novo /Portugal.

- GREAT EUROPEAN BATTLES (2002)

Baktruppen Camp Kortrijk Uncover Operation (BACKUNCOP). Site Specific, Limelight, Kortrijk / Belgium

- WARTE NUR! (2002)

BALD KOMMT DIE GANZE GESICHTE VON IDENTITÄT UND IDENTITOT Live radio play performed body painted as animals. Transferred to Germany by Deutschland Radio / Bayeriches Rundfunk, and streamed to Bergen, Toronto and Barcelona. ZKM, Karlsruhe / Germany

- HOMO EGG EGG (2002)

The identity, difference and evolution of mankind including the Neanderthals. Teglverksgata, Oslo / Norway, Kaaitheater, Brussel / Belgium, Perfect Performance, Stockholm / Sweden, BIT – Teatergarasjen, Bergen / Norway.

- LIEBESTOD (2001)

Biljana Srbljanovic's play «Pad» slaughtered by Baktruppen. Stavanger International Festival of Literature / Norway

- OLD TIME FFWD (2001)

Baktruppen's CV performed in fast forward mode. M/S Vesterålen between Rørvik-Brønnøysund. M/S Vesterålen between Svolvær-Stokmarknes / Norway, Music Factory, Bergen / Norway.

- QUALITYSMASHING (2000)

Smashing quality and a Mitsubishi at The Norwegian Council of Cultural Affairs’ conference about art and quality, Grieghallen, Bergen / Norway.

- EUROHÆ? (2000)

The author Dag Solstad went from Moscow to Dublin. Based on his reports, Baktruppen made a floppy horror show about Europe. BIT – Teatergarasjen, Bergen / Norway, Gøteborggata 27, Oslo / Norway, Høvleriet, Haugesund / Norway, Norwegian Literature Festival, Lillehammer / Norway, Kunstbanken, Hamar / Norway, Teaterhuset Avantgarden, Trondheim / Norway, M/S Vesterålen Rørvik-Brønnøysund, M/S Vesterålen Svolvær-Stokmarknes, Tromsø Kunstforening, Grenland Friteteater, Porsgrunn, Black Box Theatre, Oslo / Norway, Von Krahli Teater, Tallinn / Estonia, Homo Novus Festival, Riga / Latvia, Amorph 01, Helsinki, Kultuurihusi Gloria / Finland, Turku Art Academy / Finland, Localmotives, Stavanger / Norway, Kampnagel, Hamburg / Germany Co.prod.: Baktruppen, BIT, Cultural City of Bergen 2000.

- STYLE IS KING (1999)

International hip hop event. Graffiti, rap, break from Bronx to Oslo. Stretch and G9, Brenneriveien, Oslo / Norway. Writers: USA: Wane, Dash, Sebar, Persue, Virus, Denmark: Bates, Side, Sweden: Tariq, Norway: Goal, Coderock, Pay2, Sean. Rappers: Petter (Sweden), Pen Jakke (N), various artists from Tee Production.

- BAKTRUPPEN AS WALL (1999)

In the absence of legal wall space for graffiti, Baktruppen dressed in white and acted as wall for writer Goal outside the Oslo Courthouse / Norway.

- VERY GOOD (1999)

Cheers to alcohol, fat, the Sami people and the Chinese. Helsinki Act, Theatre Corner / Finland, Panacea, Stadsteatern, Stockholm / Sweden, Podewil, Berlin / Germany, Kunstlerhaus Mousonturm, Frankfurt / Germany, Reykjavik Nordic House / Iceland, Baltoscandal Festival Rakvere / Estland, Capitals, Modern Art Centre, Lisboa / Portugal,

- SPECT (1999)

3D wild style body graffiti on sleeping pills. Samtidskunstforum, Oslo / Norway, 21. Norddeutche Theatertreffen, Theater Lübeck / Germany, Helsinki Act '99, Helsinki / Finland, BIT – Teatergarasjen, Bergen / Norway, Stretch, Oslo / Norway, Künstlerhaus Mousonturm, Frankfurt / Germany, Museum for Contemporary Arts, Oslo / Norway, ICA, London / UK, Teaterhuset Avantgarden, Trondheim / Norway.

- KVAKK (1998)

Contemporary agricultural theatre about the breeding ox Storm Kvakkestad. Chapter Art Centre, Iconoclastic Theatre Season, Cardiff / UK, Samtidskunstforum Art Gallery, Oslo / Norway, 21. Norddeutche Theatertreffen, Theater Lübeck / Germany, Helsinki Act-99, Theatre Corner / Finland, Theatertextcontext BIT – teatergarasjen, Bergen / Norway, Kvakk in the field, Tynes Nedre, Levanger / Norway.

- PERFECT HAPPINESS (1998)

Baktruppen tell Chinese stories while Zhou Huilin og Zhang Zhulian play Chinese music in an exhibition of ancient Chinese art. Cultural City of Bergen 2000, Museum of Industrial Arts, Bergen / Norway.

- GOOD GOOD VERY GOOD (1997)

Cheers to alcohol, The Sami People and The Chinese. In co-op. with L&O Amsterdam. BIT Teatergarasjen, Bergen / Norge, Expo Zaal, De Brakke Grond, Amsterdam / Netherlands, STUC, Leuven / Belgium, Limelight, Kortrijk / Belgium, Fellessentralen Art Event, Kunstnernes Hus, Oslo, Smutthullet, Alta, Porsanger Vertshus, Lakselv, Bakteharji, Kautokeino, Kulturhuset, Karasjok, Malmklang, Kirkenes, M/S Midnatsol, Tromsø Kunstforening / Norway. Co-prod.: Baktruppen, STUC, Das TAT, L&O Amsterdam, BIT Teatergarasjen and EU's Caleidoscope.

- COME ON EVERYBODY (1997)

Music for alcoholics. Songs from the CD Come On Everybody performed live. Hordaland Prosjektgalleri «Nye møte», Bergen Kunstforening / Norway, «ZOOM», Zoolounge, Oslo / Norway.

- GOOD (1996)

Erik Balke's unpaid bills exhibited and sold. Galleri Struts, Oslo / Norway.

- VERY (1996)

Antipodal dance theater about the Sami people and the Chinese. Galleri Otto Plonk, Bergen / Norway.

- GOOD (1996)

Music for Alcoholics. Warm up concert for Mike Kelley, Paul McCarthy and Extended Noise. UKS / Oslo Rock Festival, Stratos, Oslo / Norway

- WE AGREE (1995)

Street demonstration, Hong Kong / Hong Kong.

- BAKTRUPPEN POLISHES THE TROPHES OF SONJA HENIE (1995)

Bak-truppen's contribution to the site specific art event Ad.Hok at Sonja Henie Art Centre. Photo and press release, Høvikodden Art Center, Oslo / Norway.

- TONIGHT :-) (1994)

Hyper textual lecture on industry, technology, time and memory on 350m2 synthetic carpets. Kampnagel, Hamburg / Germany, TAT-Bühne, Frankfurt / Germany, Hebbel Theater, Berlin, Det Akademiske Kvarter, Bergen / Norway, Kongsvinger Teaterfestival / Norway, BIT – teatergarasjen, Bergen / Norway, Electra, Høvikodden Kunstsenter, Oslo / Norway, Co-prod.: Kampnagel, TAT, Hebbel Theater, BIT Teatergarasjen.

- BAKTRUPPEN OPEN PROJECT IN GAMLEBYEN (P.I.G) (1994)

Buried to the waist in the maple grove Baktruppen praise the art event. Borgen, Oslo / Norway.

- SUPER – PER (1994)

Highlights from Baktruppen's life as Per Gynt (1993). BIT – teatergarasjen, Bergen, Bodø Kunstforening, Bodø, Arbeideren, Kabelvåg, Gimle, Stamsund, Trondenes fort, Harstad, M/S Ragnvald Jarl, Ungdommens hus, Tromsø, M/S Vesterålen / Norway, TAT-Probebühne, Frankfurt / Germany, Trippel X, Amsterdam / Netherlands, European performance and theater towards the year 2000, Kanonhallen, København / Denmark, LIFT, ICA, London / UK, EXIT, Maison des Arts, Creteil, Paris / France, Theatre 140, Brussel / Belgium, STUC, Leuven / Belgium, Hong Kong Arts Centre / Hong Kong, TAT, BIT Teatergarasjen, Zürcher Theaterspektakel, Hebbel Theater and Monty.

- PEER YOU’RE LYING, YES! (1993)

V version: Per Gynt opens an Institute for happiness research. Goederenstation Zuid, Antwerpen / Belgium. Co-produced by Monty.

- PEER DU LÜGST, JA! (1993)

IV version: Seit letzte Eiszeit. Hebbel Theater, Berlin, TAT-Probebühne, Frankfurt. Co-prod.: The Norwegian Dep. of Foreign Affairs, Hebbel Theater.

- PEER YOU’RE LYING, YES! (1993)

III version: In 1997 Hong Kong will be incorporated into China. Rote Fabrik, Zürich. Co-produced by Zürcher Theater Spektakel.

- PEER DU LYVER, JA! (1993)

II version: Meeting the Curved one. BIT – Teatergarasjen, Bergen / Norway. Co-produced by Bergen International Theatre.

- PEER DU LÜGST, JA! (1993)

I version: An erotical enlightmentshow. TAT-Probebühne, Frankfurt / Germany. Co-produced by Theater am Turm (TAT).

- THE MEANING OF EXTACY (1992)

The adult world explained to children. Performance Art Festival for Children and Youth, Black Box Theatre, Oslo / Norway.

- HAMLET FOR FREE (1992)

HAMLET performed in a gold painted bank valve, video transferred to the street outside. Scene 1935–92, Exhibition in Norges Bank, Bergen / Norway.

- BAK-TRUPPEN LIVE FROM ESPEVÆR (1992)

Radio-play transmitted through 37 local radio stations in Norway. Espevær, Norway.

- AB JETZ III – OR BAK-TRUPPEN GERMANIA TOD IN BERLIN (1992)

Based on Bakruppen's Germania Tod in Berlin, based on Heiner Müller's drama. Performed playback with bleached hair and no trousers. Text in co-op. with Stefan Döring. Felix Meritis, Amsterdam / Netherlands. Co-produced by Felix Meritis, Amsterdam.

- “ “ (1991)

11 sequences performed in different order each time. Bergen Visningssenter, Bergen / Norway, Felix Meritis, Amsterdam / Netherlands, BIT – teatergarasjen, Bergen / Norway, Touch Time, Melkweg, Amsterdam / Netherlands, Eurokaz, Scena Cecao, Zagreb / Kroatia, Belluard/Bollwerk, Belluard, Fribourg / Germany, Festival International de Teatro, Claustro de San Augustin, Malaga / Spain, Inteatro 91, Teatro del Parco, Polverigi / Italy, Zürcher Theater Spektakel, RoteFabrik, Zürich / Switzerland, Black Box Theatre, Oslo / Norway, Hedemark Teater, Elverum / Norway, Kaaitheater, Brüssels / Belgium, STUC, Arenberginstituut, Leuven / Belgium, Theater am Turm, Frankfurt / Germany, Salle Sthrau, Maubeuge / France, Theatre du Radeau, La Fonderie, Le Mans / France, Freistil '92, Tacheles, Berlin / Germany. Co-produced:Felix Meritis, Mickery, B.I.T.

- ACTION IN NIEDERKIRCHNERSTRASSE, BERLIN NOVEMBER 1990

Baktruppen sell the remains of Baktruppen's office in Bergen. The remains of the sale were given away, and the last things were left by the wall marked "umsonst".

- WHEN WE DEAD AWAKE (1990)

A multi purpose all round Ibsen production. Teater Druzhba, Tbilisi / Georgia, IOGT-huset, Bergen, Folken, Stavanger. Sykkelfabrikken, Sandnes, Dalane Vidergående Skole, Egersund., Music Factory, USF, outdoors, Bergen, Hedemark Teater, Galleri F15, Moss, Oslo Int. Theatre, Scenehuset, Oslo / Norway, Theater Westend, Zürich, Zürcher Theater Spektakel / Switzerland, De Markten, Brüssel / Belgium, Akademie der Künste, Berlin / Germany, Felix Meritis, Amsterdam / Netherlands, Scena Cekao, Zagreb / Kroatia, Festival Int. de Teatro, Claustro de San Augustin, Malaga / Spain,

- GERMANIA TOD IN BERLIN (1989)

Heiner Müller's drama, adapted. Seven people behind a wall. An episcope showing pictures. The participants speak, sing and walk their way through a treacherous post-war period, where the betrayel is uncouncious and private. Each and every man is alone, yet vaguely dreaming of a common stance. Pictures are taken. Høvikodden Kunstsenter, Oslo / Norway, Bandens Teater, International Video & Performance Festival, Odense / Norway, Teatretreff −89, Hotel Norge, Bergen / Norway, Back 2 Back, Frascati, Amsterdam / Netherlands, Experimenta 6, Mousonturm, Frankfurt / Germany, Helsinki Festspel, Savoy Teater, Helsinki / Finland, Theater Westend, Zürich, Zürcher Theater Spektakel / Switzerland, De Markten, Brüssel / Belgium, Akademie der Künste, Berlin / Germany, Co-prod.: Bergen International Theater and Høvikodden Art Centre.

- CUR (1989)

A new burlesque about two Norwegian families celebrating Christmas. On the Holy night a murder is committed and immediately forgotten. The play takes place on four platforms, stylized according to a clumsy normality. Turnhallen, Bergen, Black Box Theatre, Oslo, Student Society, Trondheim / Norway.

- PETRA (1988)

Cabaret from Norwegian topography. An informal mix of recitation and songs. Wonderful effects and catchy new music. Excerpts from "Before we get married"(1957), the song book "Petra"(1949), and lyrics by Øyvind Berg. Bergen International Theatre Festival 1988, Café Chagall, Bergen, Great Hall, Turnhallen, Bergen / Norway.

- EVERYTHING (1988)

Based on Ibsen's "Brand"(1866). Brand's conflict is manifested in a 5,5 m. high steel tower. In and around the tower, his inhuman craving for utopia is revealed. The will to control the world according to one specific viewpoint leads to a 55 minute long continual and social collapse. USF, Bergen, Nordre Teater, Oslo, Solheimsviken Verft, Bergen / Norway.

- YES, I GO OVER TO THE DOGS (1987)

Norway in the eighties. Performed in three different areas in a 100 m. long tunnel with one masculine and one feminine side. After the demice of democracy, freedom is presented as a heightened awareness of death and sexual pleasure. Based on the books “The Moment of Freedom” and “Without a thread” by Jens Bjørneboe. Teatertreff −87, Fall-out shelter, Bergen, Det røde sjøhus, Stavanger, The Architect school, Oslo / Norway, The Box, Gothenburg / Sweden, Singel record, Berlin 1988.

- THE LITTLE BEARS (1987)

Red-clad people sidled round and round outside the café, then walked into the café, sat down with their teddy-bears and made teddy-bear noises. Evacuation. Action, Café Opera, Bergen / Norway.

- INVISIBLE THEATRE AT CAFE OPERA (1987)

Participants wearing identity-cards walked into the café, sat down and read the Invisible Theatre's Repertory. A collection was made at the exit. Café Opera, Bergen / Norway.

- NORWEGIAN POETRY WHILE PADDLING (1987)

With woolen socks and wet feet reading Norwegian classics aloud. Action, Ole Bulls Plass, Bergen / Norway.

== Members ==
Members have been:

- Øyvind Berg (1986–2011)
- Tone Avenstroup (1986–1995)
- Gurå Mathiesen (1986–1999)
- Jørgen Knudsen (1986–2011)
- Worm Winther (1986–2011)
- Ingvild Holm (1987–2011)
- Hans Petter Dahl (1987–1997)
- Bo Krister Wallström (1989–2011)
- Trine Falch (1988–2006)
- Erik Balke (1989–2006)
- Per Henrik Svalastog (1999–2011)

== External participants ==
- 2010: Nils Henrik Asheim, Yngvar Larsen, Christopher Hewitt
- 2009: John Hegre
- 2008: John Hegre, Hans Skogen, Hildur Kristinsdottir, Richard Knightley, Eleni Nicolaou, Eliot Bradshaw, Maria Dommersnes Ramvi, Martin Whelan, Rebekka Maria Nystabakk, Vito Maraula, Rudi Jensen, Veronika Bökelman, Dee Patton, Christina Jensen, Anders Thorbjørnsen, Dickson Dee
- 2007: Hans Skogen, Lise Risom Olsen, Nina Tecklenburg, Florian Feigl
- 2006: John Hegre, Hans Skogen
- 2005: John Hegre, Hans Skogen
- 2002: Gisle Frøysland, John Hegre.
- 2000: Dag Solstad
- 1999: Gisle Frøysland, Sean, Goal, Pay2, Harald Fetveit, Klaus Tjønn, Marianne Tjønn
- 1998: Harald Fetveit, Pål Norheim, Zhou Huilin, Zhang Zhulian, Thora Dolven Balke
- 1997: Anneke Bonnema, Hans Petter Dahl, Knut Ove Arntzen, Sofie Berntsen, Lisbeth Bodd, Morten Cranner, Ali Djabbari, Staffan Eek, Sven Erga, Fredrik Falch Johannessen, Preben Faye Scøll, Harald Fetveit, Otto Fischer, Svein Flygari, Pål Flygari, Anne Britt Gran, Mattias Härenstam, Finn Iunker, Kai Johnsen, Inghild Karlsen, Ulf Knudsen, Marina Krig, Sofia Lagerkvist, Tor Lindstrand, Håkon Lindbäck, Martin Ljungberg, Anders Mosling, Asle Nilsen, Anné Olofsson, Tommy Olsson, Per Platou, Ales Ree, Tor Sandnes, Ketil Skøyen, Marianne Solberg, Mårten Spångberg, Amanda Steggell, Mark Steiner, Ingebjørg Torgersen, Death Waits, Trine Wiggen, Johan Wollmer, Terje Lind Bjørsvik
- 1995: Terje Dragseth, Marit Anna Evanger
- 1994: Gisle Frøysland. Finn Iunker, Terje Lind Bjørsvik
- 1993: Gisle Frøysland, Caspar Evensen, Ragnhild Vannebo, Stefan Döring
- 1992: Stefan Döring, Peter Hollinger, Bert Papenfuss, Stefan Döring, Morten Eng, Sven Åge Birkeland, Linda Krogsæter, Rune Hovda, Casper Evensen, Rolv Skøien, Janne Aas, Reidar Karlsen, Ingvild Horn, Rolv Bergesen, Sveinung Igesund, Dag Igland, Henriette Harbitz, Bjørn Kolbjørnsen, Erling Thorsrud, Svein Kirkhorn, Trude Rabben, Trond Absalonsen
- 1991: Sven Erga, Niko Tenten, Stefan Döring, Chain Fjolnesa Hansen-ert, Dunengen Jørsk, Bela Kirek, Verb Nidgøy, Rett Nash Pedal, Gorm Hau Teisen, Krall Woterbröm Tiss, Nesa Venturopot, Ming Hild Vol, Reim W. Wortenh
- 1990: Wolfgang Krause, Bente Geving, Werner Durand, Terje Geving, Jan Sveen, Ole H. Hagen, Anne Katrine Dolven, Per Kvist, Niko Tenten
- 1989: Rolf Eriksen, Erik Meling, Monica Haugan, Tom Rasmussen, Monika Wilkosz-Ohldieck, Olav Myrtvedt
- 1988: Monica Haugan, Tom Rasmussen, Rolv Bergesen, Olav Myrtvedt, Gry Nøstdahl, Roddy Bell, Arnold Iversen, Katrine Nylund, Anne Tone Lindsholm, Anne Stine Bankrøed-Nielsen, Sven Åge Birkeland, Tim Birkeland, Svein Ove Kirkhorn
- 1987: Ketil Berge, Rolf Eriksen, Anne Tone Lindsholm, Jarle Aadna, Rolv Bergesen, Robert Heggdal, Anne Gro Innstrand, Anne Stine Bankrøed Nielsen, Dorthe Mowinckel Keyser, Gry Nøstdahl

== Video ==
- Quality smashing (2001)
- Baktruppen as wall (1999)
- Homo Egg Egg trailer (2000)
- We agree (1997)
