= Teater Vestland =

Theatre in Førde, Norway

Coordinates: 61°27′13″N 5°52′02″E

Teater Vestland (former Sogn og Fjordane Teater) is a theatre based in Førde, Norway. Founded in 1977, it serves as the regional theatre for Vestland county, and tours with performances across the county.

Theater tours in Vestland focus especially on new Norwegian drama, plays with stories from the region and politically engaging performances. In 2010, the theatre and theater director Terje Lyngstad received the Hedda Award (Heddaprisen) in the class "Special artistic effort" (Norwegian: Særlig kunstnerisk innsats) for investment in new, Norwegian drama with a regional perspective.
