= Birgitte Victoria Svendsen =

Norwegian actress (born 1957)

- Born: 14 December 1957
- Occupation: Actor
- Awards: The Hedda Award for Best Actress (2009)

Birgitte Victoria Svendsen (born 14 December 1957) is a Norwegian actress. For her stage work she has won one Hedda Award.

== Career ==
Svendsen was initially employed at Rogaland Teater from 1980. Following employments at Fjernsynsteatret from 1982 and Riksteatret from 1984, she returned to Rogaland Teater in 1986. From 1990 on she has been a cast member at Oslo Nye Teater.

She had guest tenures at Agder Teater, Nationaltheatret and Riksteatret before playing the role as Mary Tyrone in Eugene O'Neill's Long Day's Journey into Night at Teatret Vårt. This role landed her the Hedda Award for best female lead in 2009.

Svendsen's film roles include Drømmeslottet (1986) and her television credits include the miniseries Ved kongens bord (2005).

== Personal life ==
She had three children. She resides at Ljan.

Awards
Preceded by Kjersti Sandal	Hedda Award for Best Actress; 2009	Succeeded by Trine Wiggen
