= Beate Grimsrud =

Norwegian writer (1963–2020)

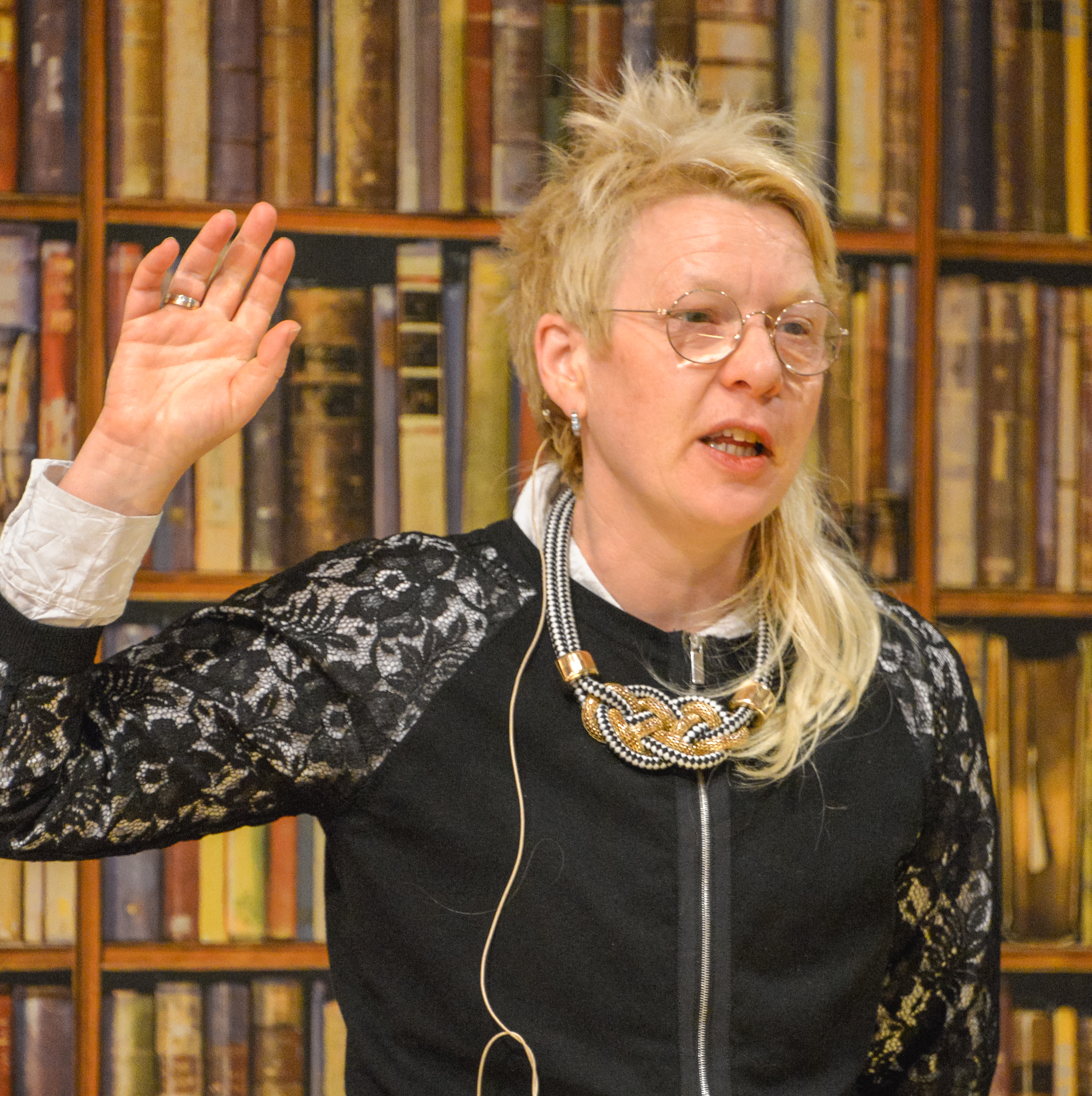
- Born: 28 April 1963; Bærum, Norway
- Died: 1 July 2020 (aged 57); Stockholm, Sweden
- Occupations: Novelist, scriptwriter and playwright
- Awards: Norwegian Critics Prize for Literature (2010); Dobloug Prize (2011)

Beate Grimsrud (28 April 1963 – 1 July 2020) was a Norwegian novelist, short story writer, children's writer, scriptwriter and playwright.

== Life ==
Grimsrud was born in Bærum, Norway and settled in Sweden. Grimsrud died in Stockholm on 1 July 2020.

== Literary career ==
Among her books are Continental Heaven (1993), Å smyge forbi en øks (1998), and Søvnens lekkasje (2007). Her novel En dåre fri (2010) was awarded the 2010 Norwegian Critics Prize for Literature. She was also awarded the Dobloug Prize in 2011.

Her children's books include Klar ferdig gå! from 2007, Alba og Adam (2008), and Dinosaurene og de dansende trærne (2009).

She was also a screenwriter of the script for the film Ballen i øyet from 2000.

Her last work was Jag föreslår att vi vaknar. Novels such as Evighetsbarnen (2015) and Jeg (2020) have yet to receive posthumous English translations.

== Awards ==
Year	Work	Award	Result	Ref
2011	En dåre fri	Swedish Academy Nordic Prize	Won	
2012	—	Dobloug Prize	Won	

== English translations ==
- —— (2015). A Fool Free (hardcover 1st ed.). London: Head of Zeus. ISBN 9781781851371.

== Selected works ==
=== Norwegian ===
- —— (1989). Det finnes grenser for hva jeg ikke forstår (in Norwegian). Cappelen.
- —— (1993). Continental Heaven (in Norwegian). Oslo: Cappelen. ISBN 9788202130718.
- —— (1998). Å smyge forbi en øks (in Norwegian). Cappelen. ISBN 9788202175085.
- —— (2002). Hva er det som fins i skogen barn? (in Norwegian). Cappelen. ISBN 8202223059.
- —— (2007). Søvnens lekkasje (in Norwegian) (hardcover 1st ed.). Cappelen. ISBN 9788202271367.
- —— (2010). En dåre fri (in Norwegian) (hardcover ed.). Cappelen. ISBN 9788202336004.
- —— (2015). Evighetsbarna (in Norwegian) (hardcover ed.). Oslo: Cappelen. ISBN 9788202480677.
- —— (2020). Jeg foreslår at vi våkner (in Norwegian) (hardcover 1st ed.). Cappelen. ISBN 9788202612580.

=== Swedish ===
- —— (1993). Continental Heaven (in Swedish). Bonniers. ISBN 9789100555276.
- —— (1999). Jag smyger förbi en yxa (in Swedish). Bonniers. ISBN 9789100568191.
- —— (2011). En dåre fri (in Swedish) (mass market paperback ed.). Bonniers. ISBN 9789174291834.
- —— (2015). Evighetsbarnen (in Swedish). Bonniers. ISBN 9789100141158.
- —— (2020). Jag föreslår att vi vaknar (in Swedish) (hardcover 1st ed.). Bonniers. ISBN 9789100170530.

=== Children's ===
- —— (2007). Klar, ferdig, gå! (in Norwegian). Aschehoug.
- —— (2008). Alba og Adam (in Norwegian). Aschehoug.
- —— (2009). Dinosaurene og de dansende trærne (in Norwegian). Aschehoug.
