= Sigrid Strøm Reibo =

Norwegian theatre director

- Born: 1982 (age 42–43); Tromsø, Norway
- Occupation: Stage director
- Awards: Hedda Award (2012, 2017)

Sigrid Strøm Reibo (born 1982) is a Norwegian stage director. She earned the Hedda Award twice, in 2012 and 2017.

== Early and personal life ==
Born in Tromsø in 1982, Reibo studied stage direction at the Klaipėda University in Lithuania, and further at the Russian Institute of Theatre Arts.

== Career ==
Reibo's debut as director was an adaptation of Samuel Beckett's play Waiting for Godot, staged at Hålogaland Teater in 2010.

In 2011 she directed Haugtussa at Rogaland Teater, based on Arne Garborg's epic circle of poems. In 2012 she won the Hedda Award for best direction, for directing the musical The Black Rider at Nationaltheatret, and for an adaptation of Molière's play The Misanthrope at Rogaland Teater. She directed Strindberg's play Dødsdansen at Rogaland Teater in 2012.

In 2017 she directed the play Orlando, based on Virginia Woolf's work, at Rogaland Teater. Orlando won the Hedda Award for best production of the year, while Reibo won the Hedda Award for best direction, for this play and for her adaptation of Shakespeare's comedy As You Like It at Nationaltheatret.

Reibo was assigned as one of the house directors at Nationaltheatret from 2015 to 2019, and as house director at the Royal Danish Theatre in Copenhagen from 2019 to 2021.
