= Mariann Hole =

Norwegian actress (born 1981)

- Born: 29 October 1981 (age 43)

Mariann Hole (born 29 October 1981) is a Norwegian actress. Mainly working on stage, she has won two Hedda Awards.

== Career ==
Hole hails from Kolbotn and took her acting education at the Oslo National Academy of the Arts and the Nordic Institute of Stage and Studio. She made her stage debut as Ophelia in Hamlet at Riksteatret in 2007, and was employed by Nationaltheatret in 2008.

From 2010 to 2012 she was an artistic director, together with Thorbjørn Harr and Jan Gunnar Røise, for the Komilab project at Torshovteatret. The trio collectively won a Hedda Award for "extraordinary artistic effort" in 2012. In addition Hole was nominated for "best supporting role" in the same year, having played Helene in Dennis Kelly's Orphans at Torshovteatret. In 2014 Hole won a Hedda Award for her leading role in Frank Wedekind's Lulu at Nationaltheatret.

Among her television acting roles are Vera in The Half Brother, for which she was nominated for a Gullruten award as best female actress. Another Gullruten nomination followed in 2023, this time for best supporting actress in Made in Oslo.
