= Milja Salovaara =

Finnish costume designer and scenographer (born 1972)

Milja Salovaara (born 1972, Helsinki) is a Finnish costume designer and scenographer/set designer. She has worked in Norway, Sweden and Finland.

In 2010, Salovaara received the Heddaprice for the best visual design for her scenography in En folkefiende (An Enemy of the People) at the Trøndelag Theater. The jury statement was as follows:

"Staging visual design can either be minimalist, grotesquely lavish or realistic illusion-creating. Everything is allowed, as long scene image both expands and completes the totality of the production. This exactly characterizes this year's laureate is here created an open, seemingly utterly simple yet complex scene image with sober elegance actors gave an extra dimension to play against and with, without ever taking the focus from the text. This scene picture was an independent artistic expression from the beginning created curiosity got new rooms and venues to occur, change and disappear, and supported and enhanced story."

== Works ==
- Anna Karenina by Leo Tolstoy (2013)
- Ronia, the Robber's Daughter (Nationaltheatret 2013, director: Cecilie Mosli)
- Nabucco (Opera Østfold 2013)
- The Seagull by Anton Chekhov (DNS 2013, director: Anna-Karen Hytten)
- Big and Ugly by Olaug Nilssen (Det Norske Teatret 2013, director: Marit Moum Aune)
- Uncle Vanya by Anton Chekhov (Nationaltheatret 2013, director: Liv Ullmann)
- The Lady from the Sea by Henrik Ibsen (Riksteatret, director: Anne-Karen Hytten)
- Love Song by Abi Morgan (Brageteatret, director: Cecilie Mosli)
- Anna Karenina by Leo Tolstoy (Riksteatret, director: Morten Borgesen)
- G7 by Eivind Salen (Teater Avantgarden, director: Ingrid Weme Nilssen)
- Hair by James Rado Geroume Ragni (Trøndelag Teater, director: Carl Jørgen Kiønig)
- The Threepenny Opera by Bertol Brecht (Trøndelag Teater, director: Gabor Zambeki)
- Den som Dikter (Whoever Writer) by Kjell Askildsen (Kilden, director: Anne-Karen Hytten)
- Vi har så korte ermer (We have short sleeves) by Olaug Nilssen (Det Norske Teatret, director: Marit Moum Aune)
- Innsirkling by Carl-Frode Tiller (Det Norske Teatret, director: Lasse Kolsrud)
- En voksen mann (A grown up man) by Trond Arntzen (Agder Teater, director: Gard B Eidsvold)
- Fyr på peisen (Fire at the fireplace) by Line Baugstø (Agder Teater, director: Anne-Karen Hytten)
- An Enemy of the People by Henrik Ibsen (Trøndelag Teater, director: Carl-Jørgen Kiønig)
- Tyskertøs (German slut) by Willy Ustad/Nora Evensen (Trøndelag Teater, director: Nora Evensen)
- A Doll's House by Henrik Ibsen (Riksteatret, director: Anne Karen Hytten)
- Eugen Onegin by Pyotr Ilyich Tchaikovsky (Den Nye Opera, director: Hilde Andersen)
- Og aldri skal vi skiljast (And never shall we be separated) by Jon Fosse (DNS, director: Stig Amdam)
- The Fidget by Ludvig Holberg (Trøndelag Teater, director: Bentein Baardson)
- Lang dags ferd mot natt (Long Day's Journey into Night) by Eugene O'Neill (Teatret Vårt, director: Erik Ulfsby)
- John Gabriel Borkman by Henrik Ibsen (Trøndelag Teater, director: Bentein Baardson)
- Jeg er vinden i trærne (I am the wind in the trees) by Jesper Halle (Trøndelag Teater, director: Jon Tombre)
- Boeing-Boeing by Marc Camoletti (Dizzie Showteater, director: Per Olav Sørensen)
- Rett i lommen (Cash on Delivery) by Michael Cooney (DNS, director: Nils Vogt)
- Ligge i grønne enger (Lying in green fields) by Anne B.Ragde (Trøndelag Teater, director: Otto Homlung)
- Hun derre Jenny (Jenny) by Eva Wikander (Brageteatret, director: Carl-Jørgen Kiønig)
- Which Witch by Adrian Bjørnhov (Det Norske Teatret, director: Hilde Andersen)
- The Wild Duck by Henrik Ibsen (Trøndelag Teater, director: Anne Karen Hytten)
- Lampedusa by Henning Mankell (Teatret Vårt, director: Henning Mankell)
- An-Magritt by Johan Falkberget (Det Norske Teatret, director: Hilde Andersen)
- Sammen igjen (Together again) (Dizzie Showteater, director: Yngvar Numme)
- Who's Afraid of Virginia Woolf? by Edward Albee (Åbo Stadsteater, director: Anna-Elina Lyytikäinen)
- Ingen skriv til Obersten (No One Writes to the Colonel) by Gabriel G. Marques (Det Norske Teatret, director: Yngve Sundvor)
- Bussen (The bus) by Lucas Bärfuss (Det Norske Teatret, director: Eirik Nilssen-Brøyn)
- Trondheim Open I (Trøndelag Teater)
- Eplehagen (Apple Garden) by Frode Sander Øyen (director: Nora Evensen)
- Folkehelsen (Public Health) by Carl Frode Tiller (director: Kjersti Haugen)
- Trondheim Open II (Trøndelag Teater)
- Det tredje stadiet (The Third step) by Tale Næss (director: Kjersti Haugen)
- Washingtin by Johan Harstad (director: Nora Evensen)
- Lukten av grønt gress (The smell of green grass) by Bjørnar Teigen (Teatret Vårt, director: Bjørnar Teigen)
- Hamlet by William Shakespeare (Centralteatret, director: Carl-Jørgen Kiønig)
- Little Eyolf by Henrik Ibsen (DNS, director: Viktoria Meirik)
- Kaos er granne med gud (Chaos is God's neighbor) by Lars Norén (Det Norske Teatret, director: Carl-Jørgen Kiønig)
- Izzat by Gro Dahle/Kjetil Bjørnstad (Den Norske Opera, director: Terje Hartvigsen)
- Blackbird by David Harrower (Nationaltheatret, director: Viktoria Meirik)
- På’an igen (One more time) by Jan Eggum (DNS, director: Erik Ulfsby)
- Kristin Lavransdatter by Sigrid Undset (Trøndelag Teater, director: Bentein Baardson)
- Mio, min Mio by Astrid Lindgren (Wasa Teater, director: Tove Appelgren)
- Bo av Sirius Teatret (Live of Sirius Theater) (Wasa Teater, director: Paul Olin)
- Sara sover (Sara is sleeping) by Petter Rosenlund (Brageteatret, director: Trond Birkedal)
- Carmen by Prosper Mérimée (Rogaland Teater, director: Erik Ulfsby)
- Scenes from a Marriage by Ingmar Bergman (Riksteatret, director: Carl-Jørgen Kiønig)
- The Ice Palace by Tarjei Vesaas (Det Norske Teatret, director: Erik Ulfsby)
- Helt Nils & Øyvind (Completely Nils & Øyvind) (Dizzie Showteater, director: Erik Ulfsby)
- West Side Story by Leonard Bernstein/Stephen Sondheim (Tampereen Teatteri, director: Heikki Vihinen)
- One Night in February by Staffan Göthe (Brageteatret, director: Trond Birkedal)
- Ronia the Robber's Daughter by Astrid Lindgren (DNS, director: Erik Ulfsby)
- Love Play by Moira Buffini (Bohusläns teater, director: Kia Berglund)
- A Doll's House by Henrik Ibsen (Tampereen Teatteri, director: Ritva Holmberg)
- Krane's Café by Cora Sandel (Trøndelag Teater, director: Carl-Jørgen Kiønig)
- Raaka Peli by Juha Siltanen (Espoon Teatteri, director: Ritva Holmberg)
- Ensamt (Lonely) (Göteborgs stadst., director: Kia Berglund)
- Of Mice and Men by John Steinbeck (Brageteatret, director: Trond Birkedal)
- A Summer's Day by Jon Fosse (Svenska Teatern, director: Anders Larsson)
- Donna Rosita by Federico G Lorca (Tampereen Teatteri, director: Ritva Holmberg)
- Rupa Lucian (Brageteatret, director: Trond Birkedal)
- Gaia by Ilpo (Kansallis Ooppera, director: Christian Lindblad)
- Herrojen Eeva by Aleksis Kivi (Tampeeren Teatteri, director: Ritva Holmberg)
- Tottering House by Maria Jotuni (Teater Giljotin, director: Kia Berglund)
- Mor och barn (Mother and Child) by Jon Fosse (Teater Giljotin, director: Kia Berglund)
- Krusbärs tregården (The Cherry Orchard) by Anders Larsson (Åbo Svenska Teatret, director: Anders Slotte)
- Minua ette saa (Minutes to be) by Jari Ehnroth (Espoon Teatteri, director: Johanna Encell)
- Richard III by William Shakespeare (Teatret Vårt, director: Hilda Helwig)
- Vart tog du elden (Where did my youth go) by Bibi Andersson (Svenska Teatern, director: Mitja Sirén)
- Paria by August Strindberg (Svenska Teatern, director: Christian Lindblad)
- Ampiais paini (TV, film, director: Meritta Koivisto)
- Solens barn (The Child of the Sun) by Maksim Gorkij (Teaterhögskolan, director: Joakim Groth)
- Carmen by Prosper Mérimée (Åbo svanska teatret, director: Ritva Holmberg)
- Hundrade drömmars fröken (Hundred dreams of a lady) by J. Encell (Åbo svanska teatret, director: Johanna Encell)
- Labdakidernas house (Antikk samling, Teaterhögskolan, director: Dan Henrikson)
- Underbart men kort by Noël Coward (Lilla Teatern, director: Frej Lindqvist)
- Ruusu Tarha (TV, film, director: Marja Ruotsala)
- Infør lycta dörrar (Behind closed doors) by J-P Sartre (Sirius Teater, director: Frank Skog)
- Barabbas by P. Lagerqvist (Sirius Teater, director: Paul Olin)
- Resor med moster (Travels with My Aunt) by Graham Greene (Åbo svenaka teatret, director: Frej Lindqvist)
- Donna D. (A. Aspelund show, Svenska Teatern, director: Tuuja Jännicke)
- Victor by L.Vitrac (Teaterhögskolan, director: Dick Idman)
- Glansbilder (Glossy image) (dance performance, Teaterhögskolan, director: Harriet Abrahamsson)
- Dødsflottet by H.Muller (Sirius Teatret, director: Peter Lüttge)
- Ett drömspel (A dream play) by August Strindberg (Teaterhögskolan, director: Maya Tångeberg-Grishin)

== Prizes ==
- Heddaprice 2010: Awarded prize in category Best Visual Design
- Heddaprice 2010: Nominated prize in category Best Visual Design
