= Ballen i øyet =

- Directed by: Catrine Telle
- Written by: Beate Grimsrud
- Starring: Laila Goody
- Distributed by: Europafilm
- Release date: 18 February 2000
- Running time: 81 minutes
- Country: Norway
- Language: Norwegian

Ballen i øyet (English: Ball in the eye) is a 2000 Norwegian comedy film directed by Catrine Telle, starring Laila Goody. Denise (Goody) is heavily short sighted, but still plays football. One day she is hit in the eye by a ball, and loses consciousness. When she wakes up, it seems that everyone else has an identical twin.

== Release ==
The film opened in Norway on 18 February 2000 on 7 screens and grossed Norwegian krone 128,045 ($14,518) in its opening week.
