= David Lagerquist =

American magazine editor

David Lagerquist became editor-in-chief of CLOAD Magazine in July 1980. That month he also started Chromasette. In an October 1981 version of Chromasette, Dave coined the term "Coco" for the TRS-80 Color Computer.
