= Hildegunn Eggen =

Norwegian actress (born 1953)

- Born: 27 July 1953 (age 71); Verdal Municipality, Norway
- Occupation: actress
- Awards: Norwegian Theatre Critics Award (2001/2002); Gammleng Award (2008); Order of St Olav (2014); Amanda Award (2017)

Hildegunn Eggen (born 27 July 1953) is a Norwegian actress.

== Biography ==
Born in Verdal Municipality on 27 July 1953, Eggen was educated at the Norwegian National Academy of Theatre, and has been assigned with the theatres Nationaltheatret and Trøndelag Teater. She made her stage debut at Nationaltheatret in 1981, in an adaptation of Federico García Lorca's play The House of Bernarda Alba.

Her films include Ja, vi elsker (1983) and Nattseilere (1986). She played in a TV adaptation of Anne Holt's Blind gudinne in 1997, in the drama series Berlinerpoplene (2007), and in the television drama series Himmelblå (2010).

She received the Norwegian Theatre Critics Award for 2001/2002, for her title role in Brecht's play Mutter Courage. She received the Gammleng Award in 2008, and the Hedda Award in 2017. She was decorated Knight of the Order of St. Olav in 2014.
