= Jørn Lier Horst =

Norwegian author and former policeman

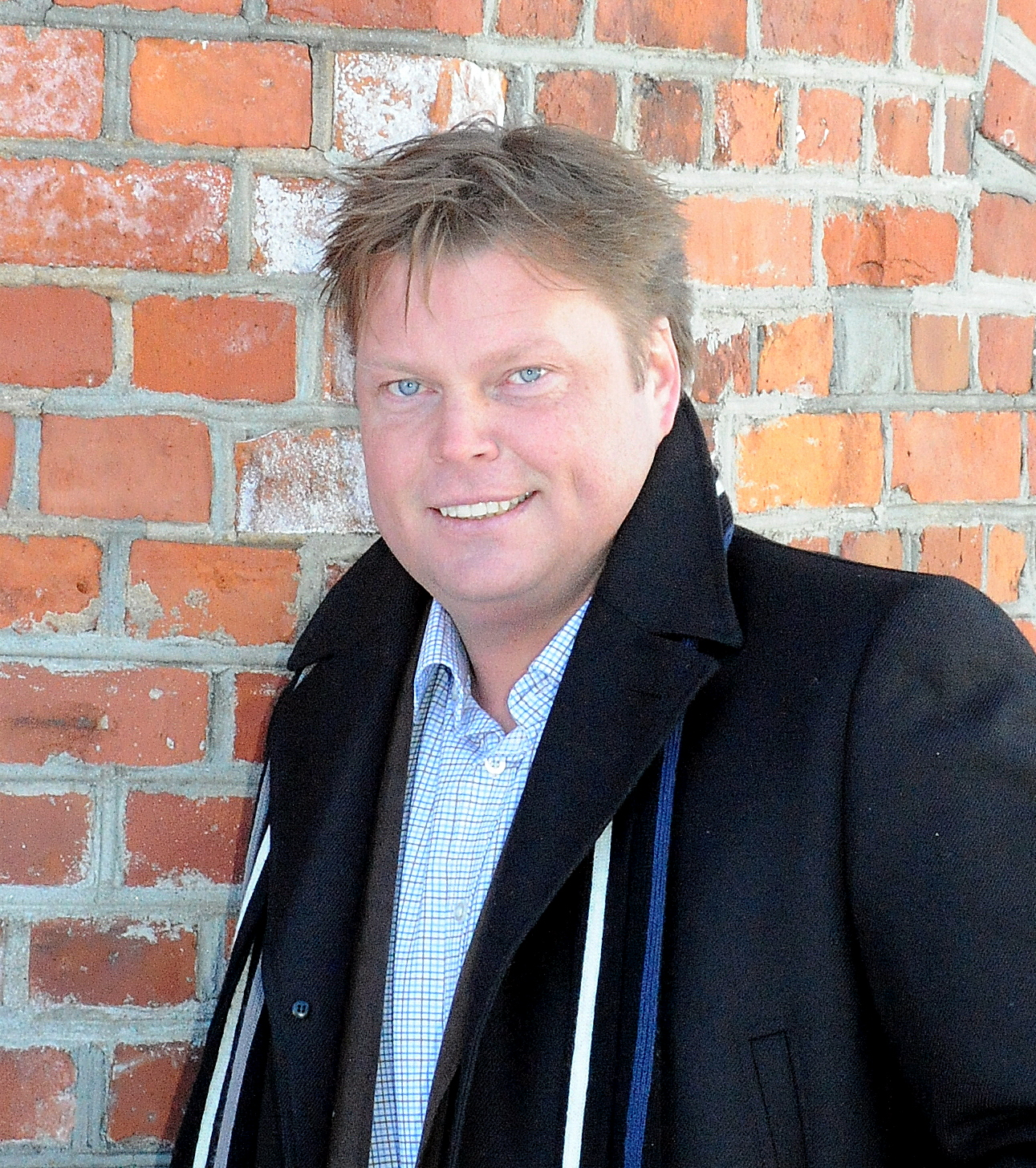
- Born: 27 February 1970 (age 56); Bamble Municipality, Telemark, Norway
- Occupations: Writer, police officer (former)
- Years active: 2004–present
- Notable work: William Wisting series, Clue series
- Spouse: Beate Horst (m. 1995)
- Children: 2
- Website: www.jlhorst.com

Jørn Lier Horst (born 27 February 1970) is a Norwegian author of crime fiction and a former Senior Investigating Officer at Vestfold police district. His books have been published in over 40 countries and have sold more than ten million copies. Horst made his writing debut in 2004 with Key Witness, based on a true murder story. The detective character in his crime novels is William Wisting, and a television series based on the series premiered in 2019.

Together with Thomas Enger, he writes the thriller series about policeman Alexander Blix and news blogger Emma Ramm.

He has also written children's books, including a series named Clue and books about Detective Agency No. 2.

== Personal life ==
Horst was born in Bamble Municipality in Telemark, the younger of two brothers. His parents were Oddvar and Hildur Lier Olsen. In 1995 he married Beate Horst and now uses her surname. They live in Stavern with their two children.

== Bibliography ==
=== William Wisting series ===
1. Key Witness (Org. Nøkkelvitnet, 2004)
2. Disappearance of Felicia (Org. Felicia forsvant, 2005)
3. When the Sea Calms (Org. Når havet stilner, 2006)
4. The Only One (Org. Den eneste ene, 2007)
5. The Night Man (Org. Nattmannen, 2009) - translated into English July 2022
6. Dregs (Org. Bunnfall, 2010) - translated into English by Anne Bruce, 2011
7. Closed for Winter (Org. Vinterstengt, 2011) - translated into English 2013
8. The Hunting Dogs (Org. Jakthundene, 2012) - translated into English 2014
9. The Caveman (Org. Hulemannen, 2013) - translated into English 2015
10. Ordeal (Org. Blindgang, 2015) - translated into English 2016
11. When It Grows Dark (Org. Når Det Mørkner, 2016) - translated into English 2016 (A prequel to the series.)
12. The Katharina Code (Org. Katharina-koden, 2017) - translated into English 2018
13. The Cabin (Org. Det innerste rommet, 2018) - translated into English 2019
14. The Inner Darkness (Org. Illvilje, 2019)- translated into English 2020
15. A Question of Guilt (Org. Sak 1569, 2020)- translated into English 2021
16. Snow Fall (Org. Grenseløs, 2021) - translated into English 2023
17. The Traitor (Org. Forræderen, 2022) - translated into English 2024
18. The Lake (Org. Tørt land, 2024) - translated into English 2025

=== Blix/Ramm series ===
1. Death Deserved (Org. Nullpunkt, 2018) - translated into English 2019
2. Smoke Screen (Org. Røykteppet, 2019) - translated into English 2020
3. Unhinged (Org. Slagside, 2020) - translated into English 2021
4. Stigma (Org. Arr, 2022) - translated into English 2023
5. Victim (Org. Offer, 2023) - translated into English 2024

=== Children's books ===
Detective Agency no. 2 series

1. Operasjon Tordensky (2013)
2. Operasjon Mørkemann (2013)
3. Operasjon Solnedgang (2013)
4. Operasjon Påskelilje (2014)
5. Operasjon Sommerøya (2014)
6. Operasjon Vindkast (2014)
7. Operasjon Bronseplass (2015)
8. Jakten på Kaptein Kroghs gull (2015)
9. Operasjon Plastpose (2015)
10. Operasjon Sirkus (2016)
11. Jakten på Jungelens Dronning (2016)
12. Operasjon Spøkelse (2016)
13. Operasjon Sjørøver (2017)
14. Jakten på Tyven-tyven (2017)
15. Operasjon Mumie (2017)
16. Detektivhåndboken (2017)
17. Operasjon Skipsvrak (2018)
18. Jakten på slottets hemmelighet (2018)
19. Operasjon Skrotnisse (2018)
20. Operasjon Svartskog (2019)
21. Jakten på Trollmannens bok (2019)
22. Operasjon Radius (2019)
23. Operasjon Lurifaks (2020)
24. Jakten på den siste dinosauren (2020)
25. Operasjon Rød sløyfe (2020)
26. Dekkoperasjon (2021)
27. Jakten på enhjørningen (2021)
28. Operasjon Heksegryte (2021)
29. Operasjon Ninja (2022)
30. Jakten på Campingkongen (2022)
31. Operasjon Gulltann (2022)
32. Jakten på den magiske julebyen (2022)
33. Operasjon Fartsstripe (2023)
34. Jakten på Vikingskatten (2023)
35. Operasjon Fangejakt (2023)

Clue series

1. Salamandergåten (2012) (The Salamander Mystery)
2. Maltsergåten (2012) (The Maltese Mystery)
3. Undervannsgåten (2013) (The Underwater Mystery)
4. Gravrøvergåten (2013) (The Grave Robbing Mystery)
5. Libertygåten (2014) (The Liberty Mystery)
6. Esmeraldgåten (2014) (The Emeralda Mystery)
7. Rivertongåten (2014) (The Riverton Mystery)
8. Hodeskallegåten (2016) (The Skull Mystery)
9. Ulvehundgåten (2016) (The Wolfhound Mystery)
10. Sjøormgåten (2017) (The Sea Serpent Mystery)
11. Einsteingåten (2017) (The Einstein Mystery)
12. Triangelgåten (2018) (The Triangle Mystery)
13. Smuglerhuset (2019) (The Smuggler’s Shack)

== Film, TV, and Stage ==
The TV series Wisting premiered on Viaplay in 2019, with Sven Nordin starring as Chief Inspector William Wisting.

The first four books in the CLUE series were adapted into the film CLUE: The Maltese Mystery in 2021 by Maipo Film. The movie was nominated for an Amanda Award in the category of Best Children's Film. Some of the books in the Detective Agency No. 2 series were adapted into films by Filmkameratene. In the fall of 2021, Riksteateret premiered the play Detective Agency No. 2 – Operation Theater, based on an original script by Horst.

Horst is also affiliated with the production company Novemberfilm, where he has been involved in several documentary productions, including The Marianne Mystery.

Horst frequently appears as an expert commentator on crime cases for outlets such as VG and serves as a regular crime commentator on Crimewatch on TV2 Norway.

In the autumn of 2022, Horst took part in the celebrity version of the reality program The Traitors. In 2023 Horst participated in the fourth season of Masked Singer Norway, disguised as The Magician (Magikeren).

As a playwright, Horst has written several family productions for Teater Ibsen and Riksteateret.

== Awards and honours ==
2010 The Riverton Prize shortlist for Dregs (no)

2011 The Riverton Prize shortlist for Closed for Winter (no)

2011 The Norwegian Booksellers' Prize for Closed for Winter (no)

2011 Vestfold Literature Prize (no)

2012 The Riverton Prize for The Hunting Dogs (no)

2012 Ark's Children's Book award shortlist for The Salamander mystery (no)

2013 The Norwegian Booksellers' Prize shortlist for The Hunting dogs (no)

2013 The Glass Key award for The Hunting Dogs (Nordic)

2013 The Norwegian Booksellers' Prize shortlist for The Caveman (no)

2016 The Petrona award for The Caveman (uk)

2014 The Martin Beck Award for The Hunting Dogs (swe)

2015 Ark's Book of the Year shortlist for Ordeal (no)

2016 The Avid Reader Award shortlist for The Riverton Mystery (no)

2016 Special Award for Excellence in Crime Fiction Writing (PL)

2016 The Petrona award for The Caveman (uk)

2017 The Avid Reader Award shortlist for The Wolfhound Mystery (no)

2017 BOK365 Book of the Year shortlist for The Katharina code (no)

2017 CWA International Dagger longlist for When it grows dark (uk)

2018 Grand Prix de Littérature Policière shortlist for The Hunting dogs (fr)

2018 BOK365 Book of the Year shortlist for The Cabin (no)

2018 The Nordic Noir Thriller of the Year Award for Dregs (Nordic)

2019 Grand Prix de Littérature Policière shortlist for The Caveman (fr)

2019 CWA International Dagger longlist for The Katharina Code (uk)

2019 The Norwegian Silver Knife award shortlist for The Cabin (no)

2019 BOK365 Book of the Year shortlist for The Inner Darkness (no)

2019 The Petrona award for The Katharina Code (uk)

2020 The Edgar Award shortlist for The Wisting TV-series (us)

2020 CWA International Dagger longlist for The Cabin (uk)

2020 The Petrona award shortlist for The Cabin (uk)

2021 Prix du Bureau des Lecteurs shortlist for Ordeal (fr)

2021 Vrij Nederland's Thriller of the Year shortlist for The Katharina Code (nl)

2021 The Petrona Award shortlist for Death Deserved (uk)

2021 The Norwegian Beech Noir Award shortlist for A Question of Guilt (no)

2023 The Norwegian Beech Noir Award shortlist for The Traitor (no)

2023 The Alf Prøysen's honorary award for the bestselling series The Detective Agency No. 2 (no)

2023 Chosen as writer of the year by Aftenposten Junior (no)

2024 Winner of The Finnish Whodunnit Society's honorary award for Excellence in Foreign Crime Writing (fi)

2024 The Riverton Prize shortlist for Victim (no)

2024 The Petrona Award shortlist for Snow Fall(uk)

2024 The Riverton Prize shortlist for The Lake (no)

2025 The Norwegian Silver Knife award shortlist for The Lake (no)

2025 Winner of The Norwegian Beech Noir Award for The Lake (no)

2026 The Riverton Prize shortlist for The Last Case (no)

2026 CWA International Dagger shortlist for The Lake (uk)
