= Torbjørn Giæver Eriksen =

Norwegian politician (born 1970)

Torbjørn Giæver Eriksen (born 1970) is a former Norwegian politician for the Labour Party, currently appointed by Norsk olje og gass as head of public affairs since 2015.

He graduated with the cand.mag. degree in political science from the University of Oslo in 1995, and started his political career as a secretary for the Labour Party in Oslo. He remained here from 1996 to 1998, and was then a secretary for the parliamentary group from 1998 to 1999. He was a central board member of JEF Norway from 1993 to 1994.

When Stoltenberg's First Cabinet assumed office in 2000, he was appointed political advisor in the Ministry of Finance. He lost this job when the cabinet fell following the 2001 election. From 2002 to 2005 he worked as an information advisor for Jens Stoltenberg. When the Stoltenberg's Second Cabinet assumed office following the 2005 election, Eriksen was appointed State Secretary in the Office of the Prime Minister. He resigned in June 2011. He undertook studies at Princeton University. In 2012 he was appointed by the communications company First House. In 2015 he was appointed by Norsk olje og gass as head of public affairs.
