= Henrik Plau =

Norwegian actor and voice over-artist

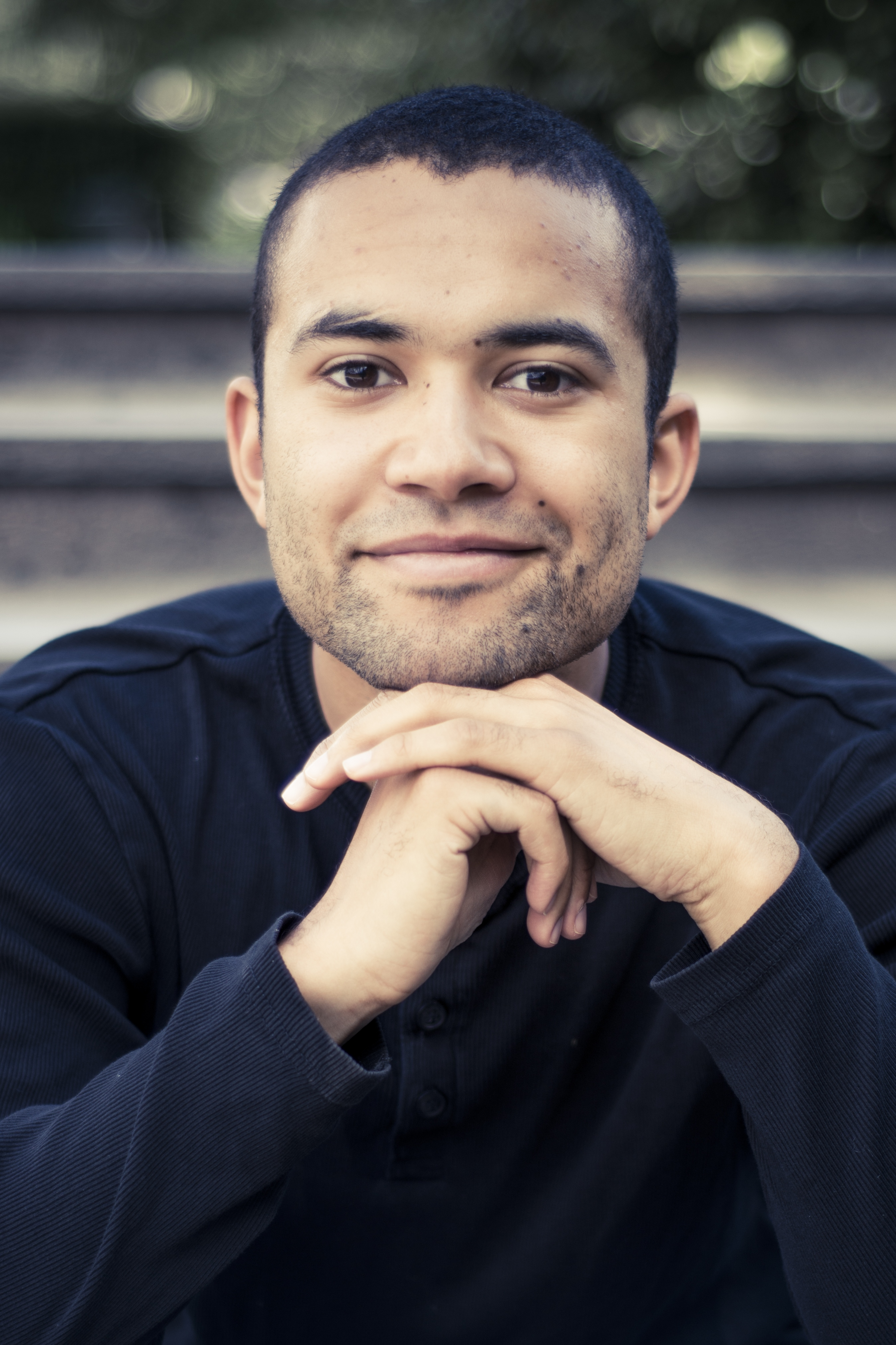
- Born: Knut Henrik Nubi Plau; Oslo, Norway
- Occupation: Actor
- Website: www.henrikplau.com

Henrik Plau is a Norwegian actor and voice over-artist born in Oslo, Norway. He trained at Nancy Mannes Acting Studio, True Acting Institute as well as Hartvig Nissen School of Performing Arts where he studied acting and fine arts. His first short film, "Lost Picture Found", was nominated for Best Short at the Grimstad Short film Festival and screened for the Short Film Palme d'Or at the 2008 Cannes Film Festival. In 2009 he was cast for a recurring role in the award-winning television series Hotel Cæsar. In 2014 he got to the last round of auditions for one of the lead roles in Star Wars: The Force Awakens directed by J. J. Abrams
