= Heidi Gjermundsen Broch =

Norwegian actress, singer and musical artist

Heidi Gjermundsen Broch (born 1 March 1975 in Norway) is a Norwegian actress, singer and musical artist.

Gjermundsen went to Paul McCartney's famous Liverpool Institute for Performing Arts (LIPA) in 1995-1997. In Norway, she went to the Norwegian school Teaterhøgskolen in 1997-2000.

She is most known for playing Donna, in the original Norway production of Mamma Mia! and for playing the original Diana in the Norwegian production of Next to Normal.

== Theatre Work ==
- Diana - Next to Normal (2010)
- Donna - Mamma Mia! (2009)
- Polly Peachum - Tolvskillingsoperaen (The Threepenny Opera) (2008)
- Maria Vittoria Farnese - Which Witch (2008)
- An-Magritt - An-Magritt (2007)
- Edith Piaf - Piaf (2004)
- Eliza - My Fair Lady (2003)

== Personal life ==
Heidi has two kids with her husband, the Norwegian actor Nicolai Cleve Broch.
