= 2014 in Europe =

This is a list of 2014 events that occurred in Europe.

== Incumbents ==
=== Albania ===
(Albania)

=== Andorra ===
(Andorra)

=== Azerbaijan ===
(Azerbaijan)

=== Belarus ===
(Belarus)

=== Belgium ===
(Belgium)

=== Bosnia and Herzegovina ===
(Bosnia and Herzegovina)

=== Bulgaria ===
(Bulgaria)

=== Croatia ===
(Croatia)

=== Czech Republic ===
(Czech Republic)

=== Cyprus ===
(Cyprus)

=== Denmark ===
(Denmark)

=== Estonia ===
(Estonia)

=== European Union ===
- President of the European Commission:
  - José Manuel Barroso (until 1 November)
  - Jean-Claude Juncker (starting 1 November)
- President of the Parliament: Martin Schulz
- President of the European Council:
  - Herman Van Rompuy (until 1 December)
  - Donald Tusk (starting 1 December)
- Presidency of the Council of the EU:
  - Greece (January–July)
  - Italy (July–December)

=== Finland ===
(Finland)

=== France ===
(France)

=== Germany ===
(Germany)

=== Georgia ===
(Georgia (country))

=== Greece ===
(Greece)

=== Hungary ===
(Hungary)

=== Iceland ===
(Iceland)

=== Ireland ===
(Republic of Ireland)

=== Italy ===
(Italy)

=== Latvia ===
(Latvia)

=== Liechtenstein ===
(Liechtenstein)

=== Lithuania ===
(Lithuania)

=== Luxembourg ===
(Luxembourg)

=== Malta ===
(Malta)

=== Moldova ===
(Moldova)

=== Monaco ===
(Monaco)

=== Montenegro ===
(Montenegro)

=== Netherlands ===
(Netherlands)

=== North Macedonia ===
(North Macedonia)

=== Norway ===
(Norway)

=== Poland ===
(Poland)

=== Portugal ===
(Portugal)

=== Romania ===
(Romania)

=== Russia ===
(Russia)

=== San Marino ===
(San Marino)

=== Serbia ===
(Serbia)

=== Slovakia ===
(Slovakia)

=== Slovenia ===
(Slovenia)

=== Spain ===
(Spain)

=== Sweden ===
(Sweden)

=== Switzerland ===
(Switzerland)

=== Turkey ===
(Turkey)

=== Ukraine ===
(Ukraine)

=== United Kingdom ===
(United Kingdom)

=== Vatican City ===
(Vatican City)

== Events ==
=== January ===
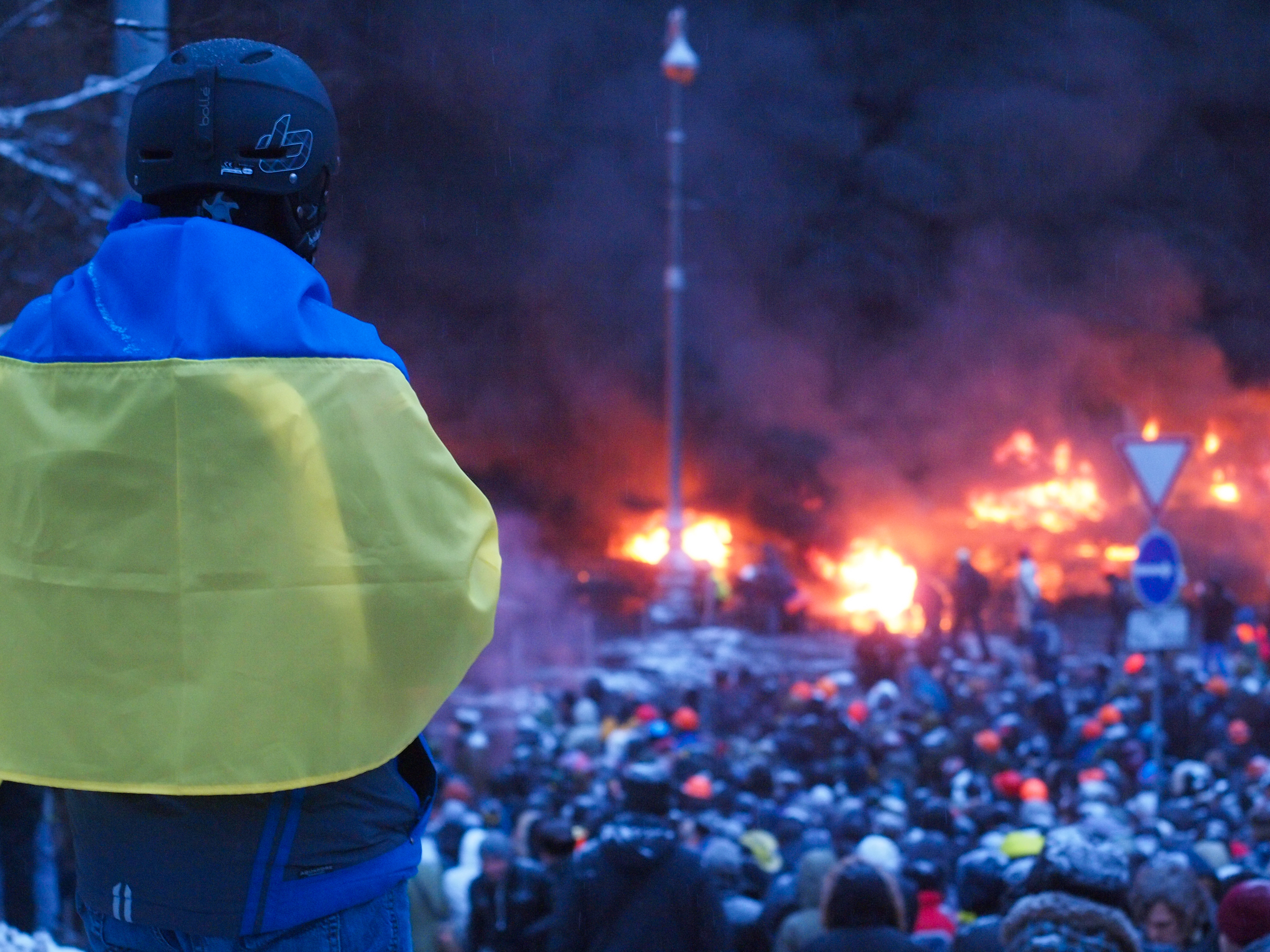
Violent clashes between protesters and police on Hrushevskoho Street, Kyiv

- 1 January
  - Greece takes over the presidency of the European Union.
  - Latvia becomes the 18th EU member state to adopt the euro despite public opposition.
  - Jamal al-Jamal, the Palestinian ambassador to the Czech Republic, is killed in an explosion near his home in Prague.
- 7 January – Four U.S. Air Force personnel die after a military helicopter crashes near Cley, on the North Sea coast of England.
- 11 January – About 110,000 people march peacefully through Bilbao, demanding Basque independence and freedom for more than 600 ETA prisoners.
- 22 January – At least five people are shot dead and hundreds injured as demonstrators clash with police over new laws limiting the right to protest in Ukraine.
- 23 January – At least 20 people are killed and 28 injured when a bus veers off a road in central Turkey.
- 28 January – Ukrainian Prime Minister Mykola Azarov submits his resignation to President Viktor Yanukovych in a bid to defuse the conflict in Ukraine.

=== February ===
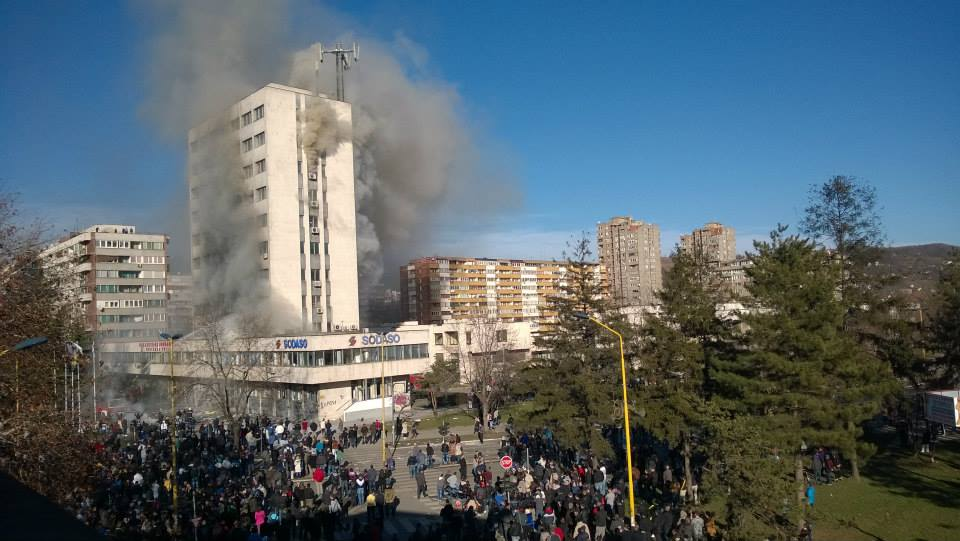
Angry protesters set fire to the building of the Government of Tuzla Canton.

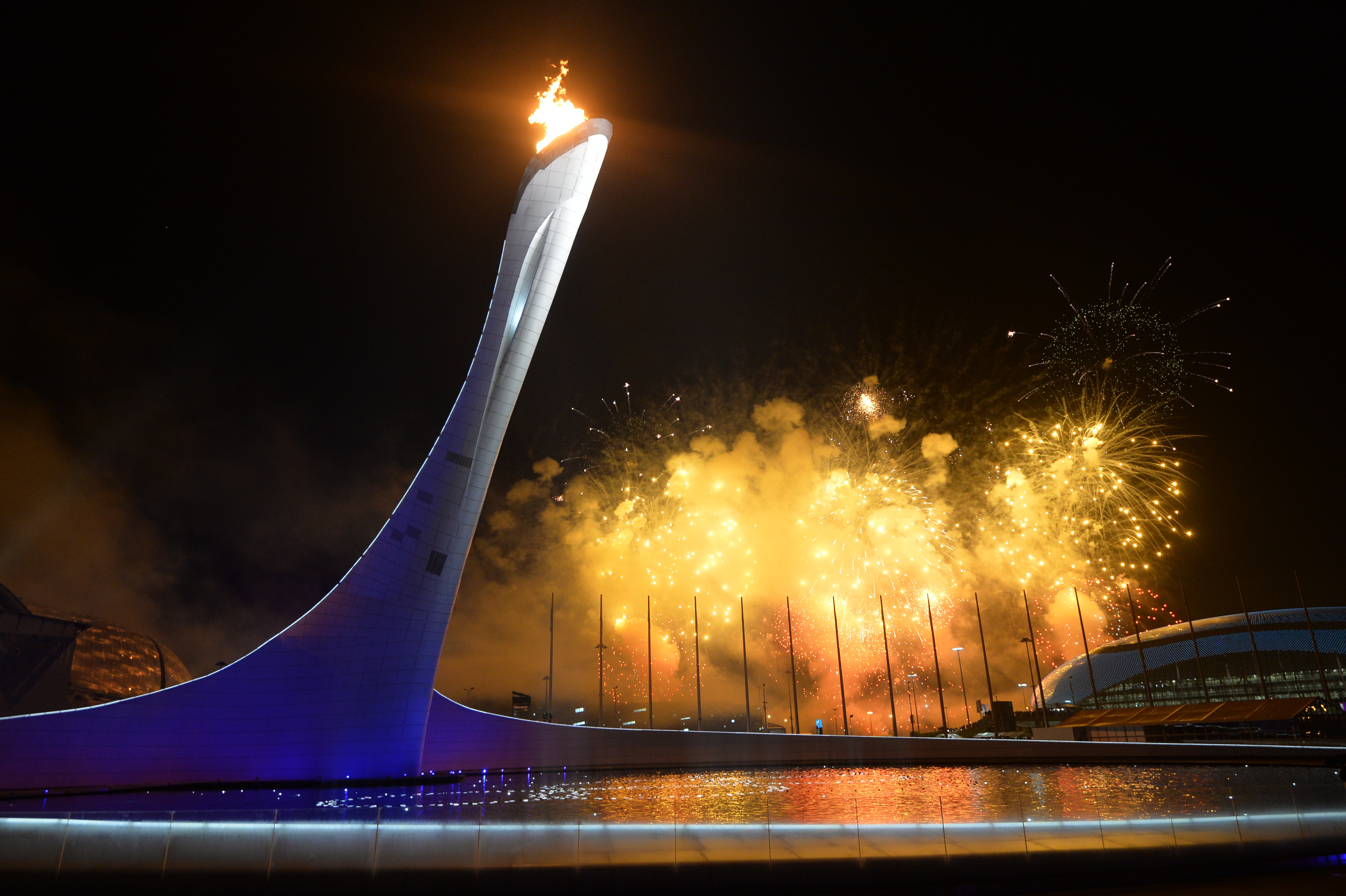
2014 Winter Olympics opening ceremony

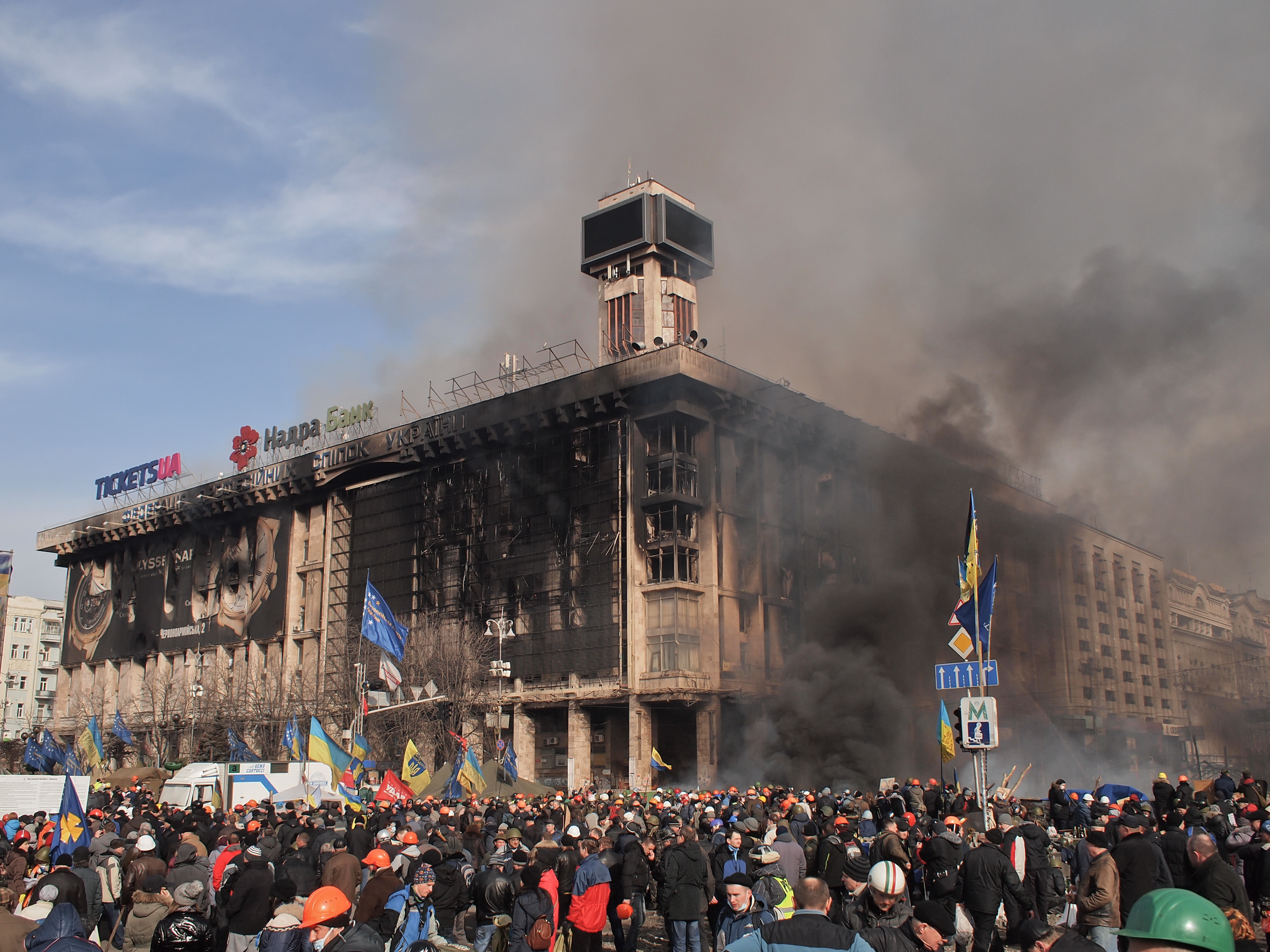
Labor Unions' House, used as Euromaidan headquarters, on fire following police raid

- 2 February
  - A referendum on Gagauzia's independence from Moldova is held with 98.9 percent of voters supporting Gagauzia's self-determination. The authorities from Chișinău declare it illegal.
  - Up to 500,000 people protest on the boulevards of Paris and Lyon against same-sex marriage.
- 4 February – At least 13 people die and five others are injured when a commuter train slams into a shuttle bus in Sumy Oblast, Ukraine.
- 6 February – More than 130 people, including 104 police officers, are injured in a second day of anti-government demonstrations in the Bosnian town of Tuzla.
- 7 February
  - The opening ceremony of the XXII Olympic Winter Games is held in the Russian city of Sochi.
  - The earliest human footprints outside Africa are discovered in Norfolk, United Kingdom.
  - About 30 police officers are injured in the Kosovo capital Pristina in clashes with students protesting over suspicions of fraud in the state university.
- 9 February – In a national referendum, Swiss voters approve re-imposing quotas on immigration from European Union countries.
- 13 February – Belgium becomes the first country to legalise euthanasia without any age limits.
- 14 February – Italian Prime Minister Enrico Letta resigns after pressure from his own Democratic Party to step down.
- 18 February – Seven miners are killed and nine injured in an explosion at the Pivnichna coal mine in Ukraine's Donetsk Oblast.
- 20 February – At least 106 people are dead and large parts of Kyiv's occupied Independence Square are burning after a bloody escalation of Ukraine's three-month political crisis.
- 22 February
  - The Parliament of Ukraine removes President Viktor Yanukovych from office and frees ex-Prime Minister Yulia Tymoshenko. The dismissed President describes measures taken by the Parliament as a "coup".
  - The Secretary of the Democratic Party, Matteo Renzi, is appointed Prime Minister of Italy by President Giorgio Napolitano. Renzi is the youngest Prime Minister in the history of Italy.

=== March ===
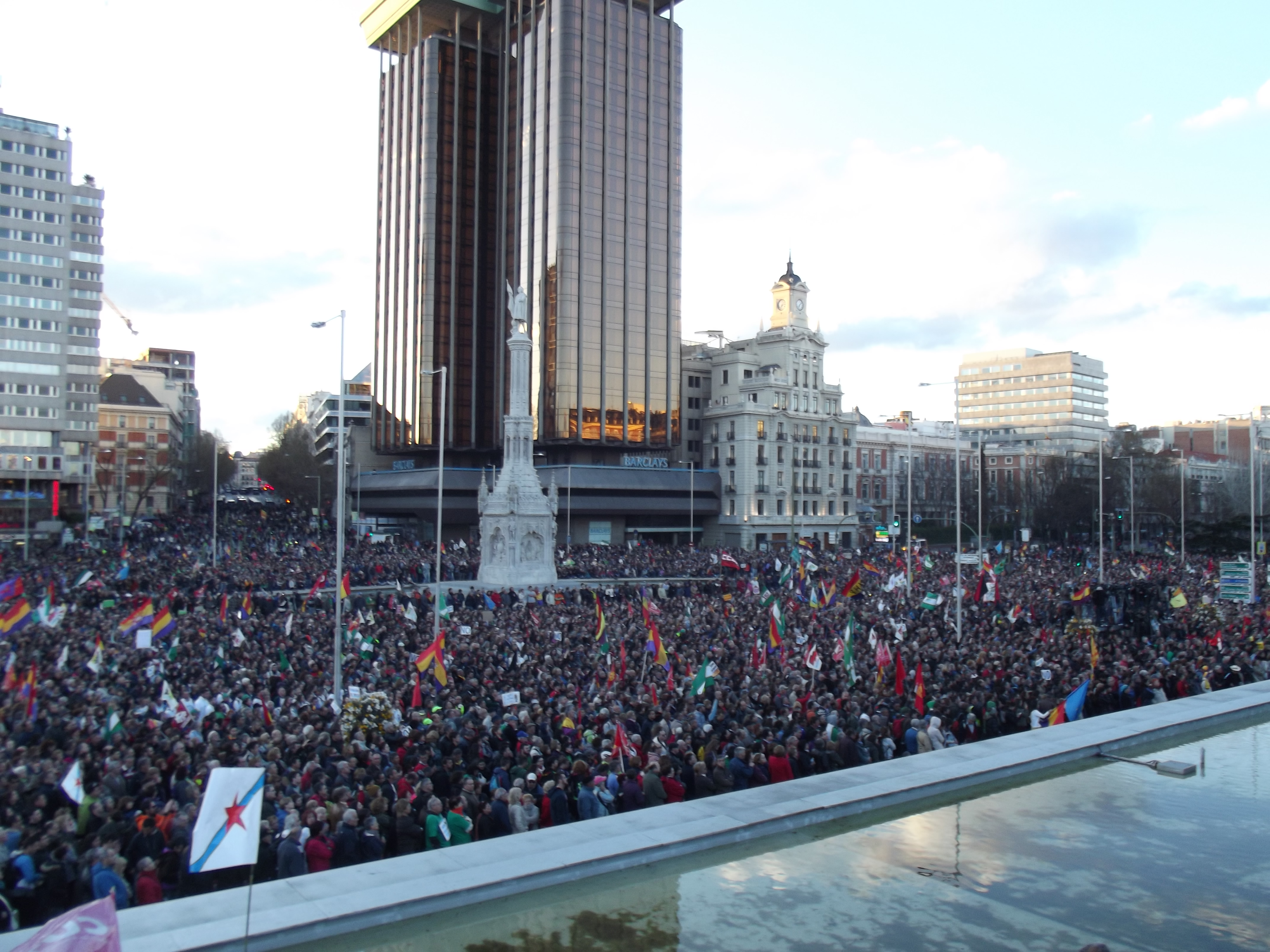
March for Dignity in Plaza de Colón, Madrid

- 1 March – Russian Federation Council approves military intervention in Ukraine amid growing tensions in Crimea.
- 4 March – After nine years in office, Estonian PM Andrus Ansip announces his resignation to enable a successor to lead his party into 2015 elections.
- 16 March – People in Crimea vote overwhelmingly to leave Ukraine and rejoin Russia. Ukraine, the European Union, and the United States condemn the move.
- 21 March – Russia formally annexes Crimea while the European Union and Ukraine sign an association agreement.
- 22 March – 101 people are injured and 29 arrested after an anti-austerity march turns violent in Madrid.
- 24 March – The U.S. and Western allies cancel G8 summit in Sochi, excluding Russia from group.
- 27 March – Turkey blocks access to YouTube after a high-level intelligence leak.
- 29 March – Philanthropist Andrej Kiska wins Slovakia's presidential run-off against current Prime Minister Robert Fico.

=== April ===
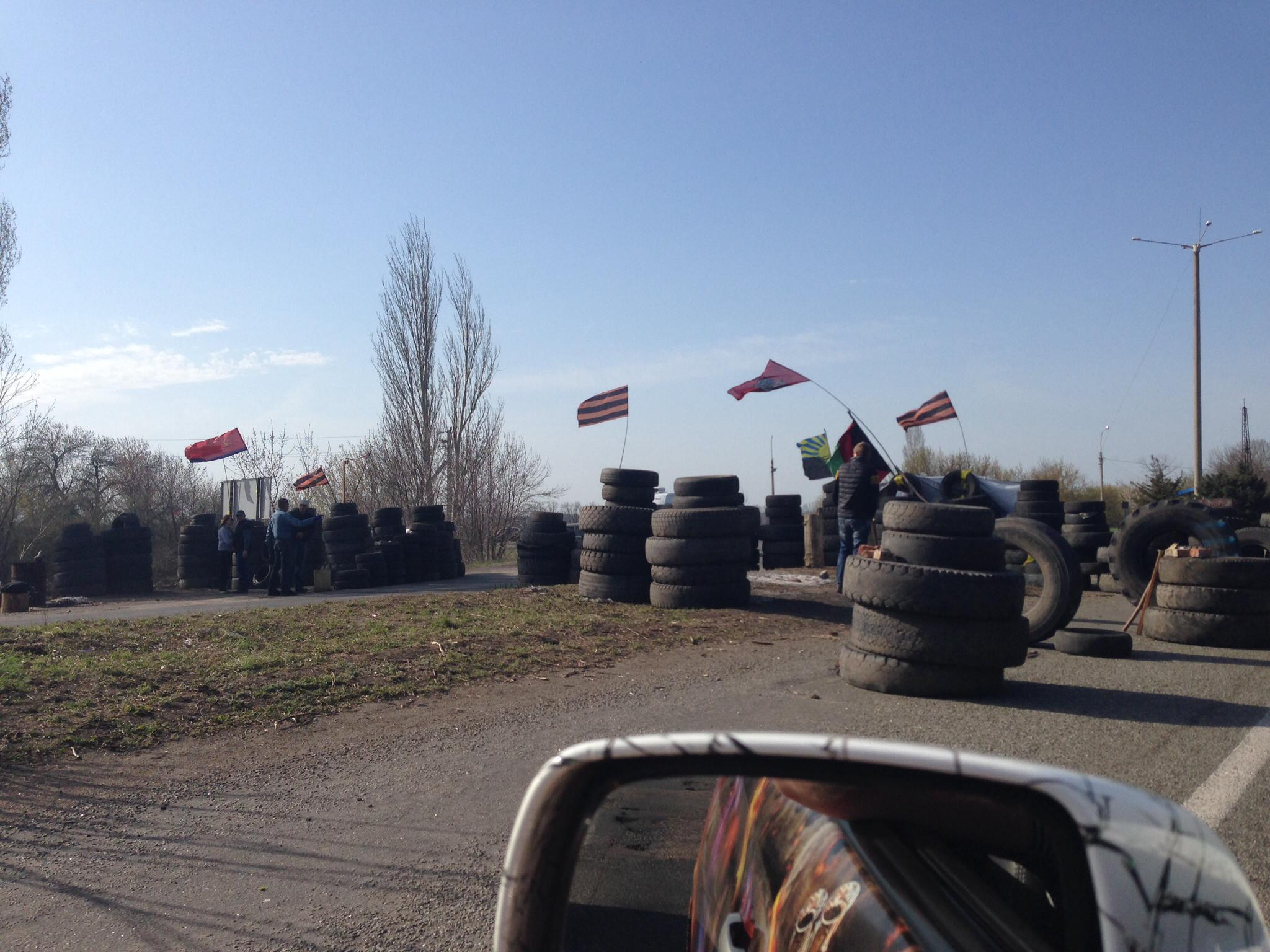
Checkpoint in Donetsk Oblast, Ukraine, during the Sloviansk standoff

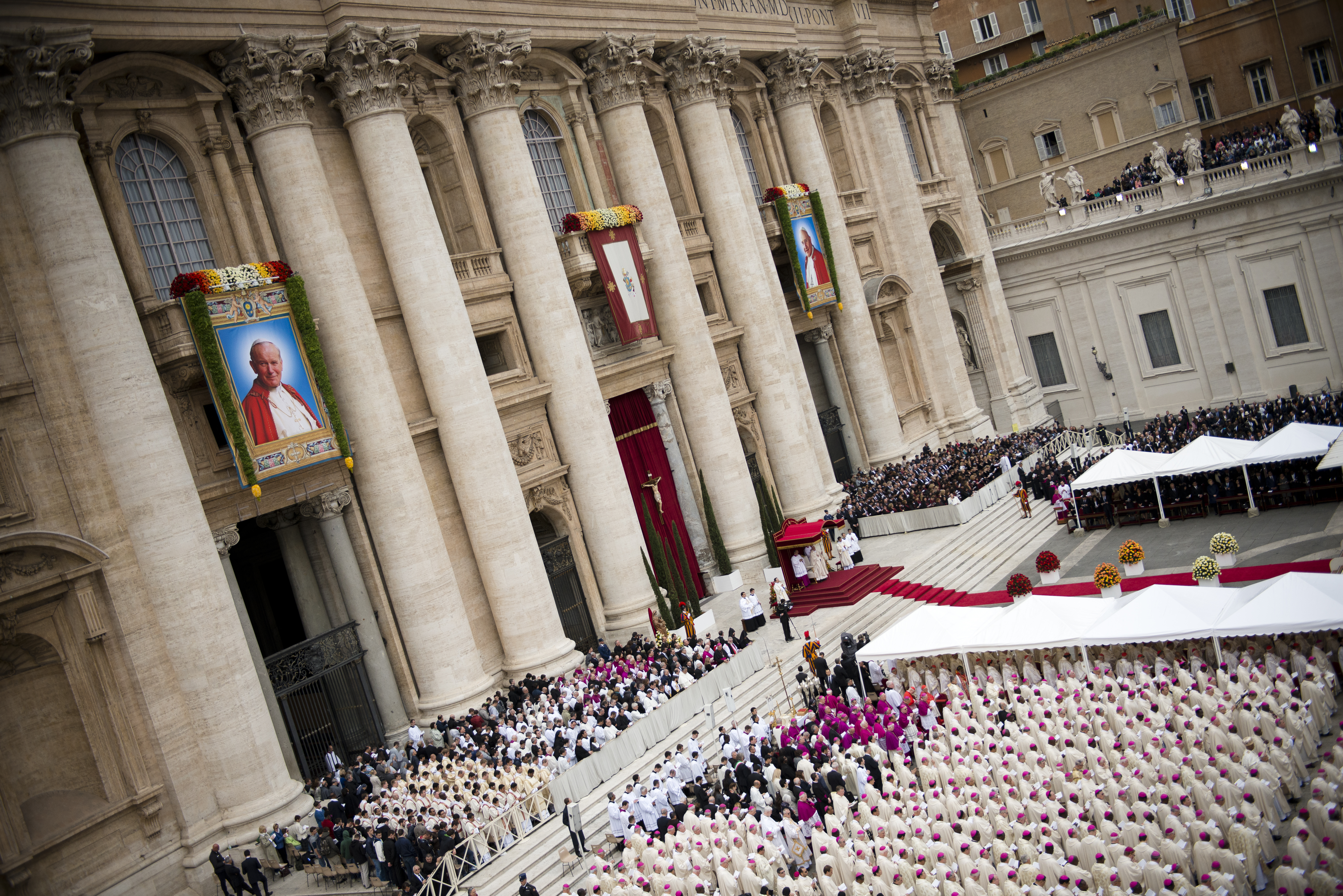
Huge crowds attending the canonization ceremony of Pope John XXIII and Pope John Paul II

- 4 April – 20 people are injured as protesters from across Europe clash with police in Brussels at a demonstration against high unemployment.
- 7 April – Pro-Russian activists occupying a government building in Donetsk proclaim the creation of a sovereign Donetsk People's Republic, independent from the central government in Kyiv. The same action is taken by protesters in Kharkiv.
- 10 April – The Parliamentary Assembly of the Council of Europe suspends Russia's right to vote and take part in election observations as a consequence to its takeover of Crimea.
- 11 April – Seven people are killed when an explosion caused by leaking gas tears through a coal mine near the eastern Ukrainian city of Donetsk.
- 12 April – An anti-austerity protest in Rome turns violent, 80 people being injured in clashes between angry protesters and riot police.
- 16 April
  - Pro-Russian separatists in Odesa announced the creation of Odesa People's Republic and urged residents to block traffic in the city.
  - The Supreme Soviet of Tiraspol votes unanimously a solicitation to the State Duma, the Federation Council and President Vladimir Putin to recognize Transnistrian independence and annexation to Russia. Romanian Foreign Minister condemns vigorously this action, cataloging it as a defiance to Moldova's territorial integrity.
- 27 April – Popes John XXIII and John Paul II are declared saints by Pope Francis in the first papal canonization since 1954.
- 28 April – Gjorge Ivanov is re-elected President of the Republic of Macedonia, while the ruling coalition led by VMRO-DPMNE win plurality in the Parliament.

=== May ===
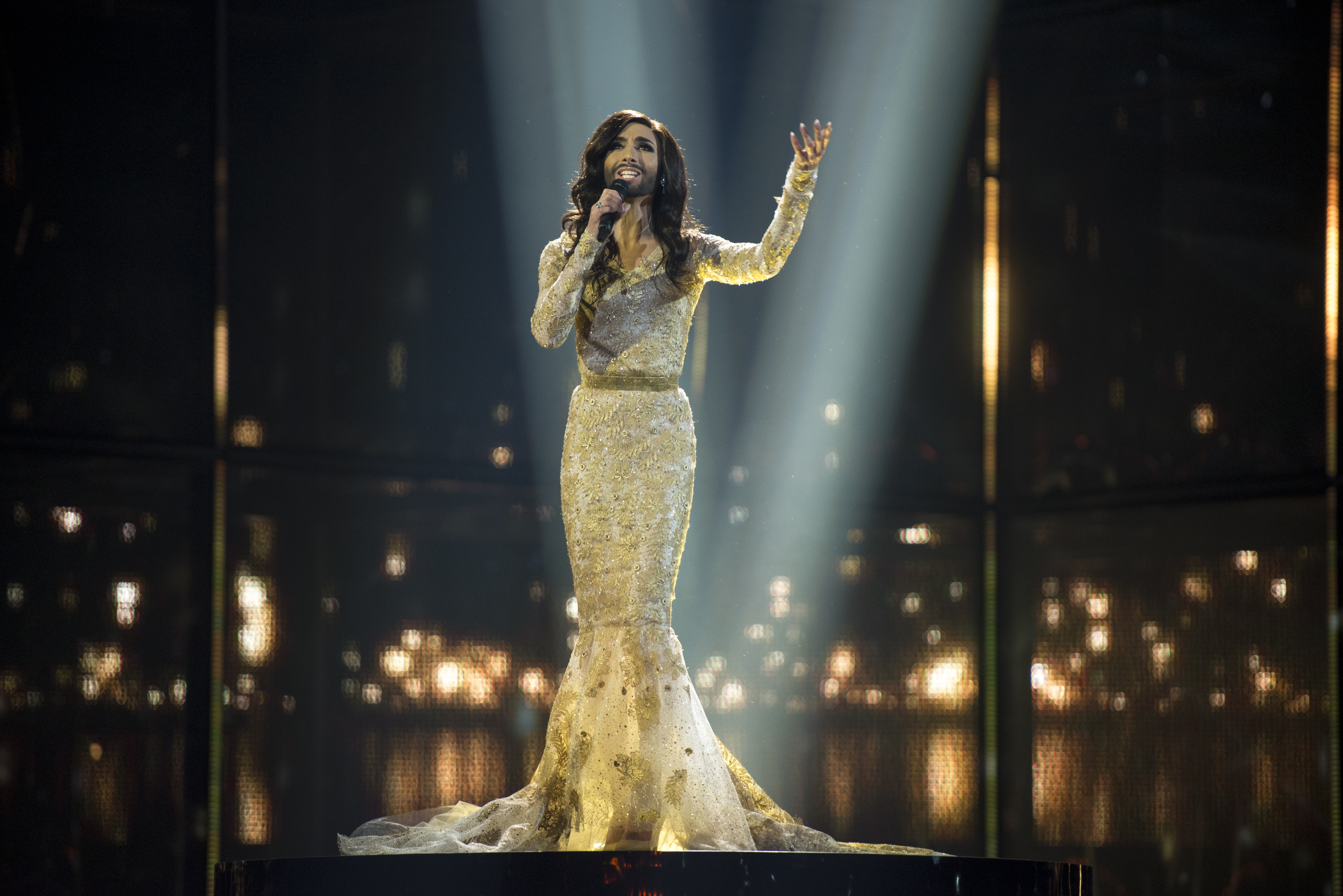
Conchita Wurst, the winner of Eurovision Song Contest 2014

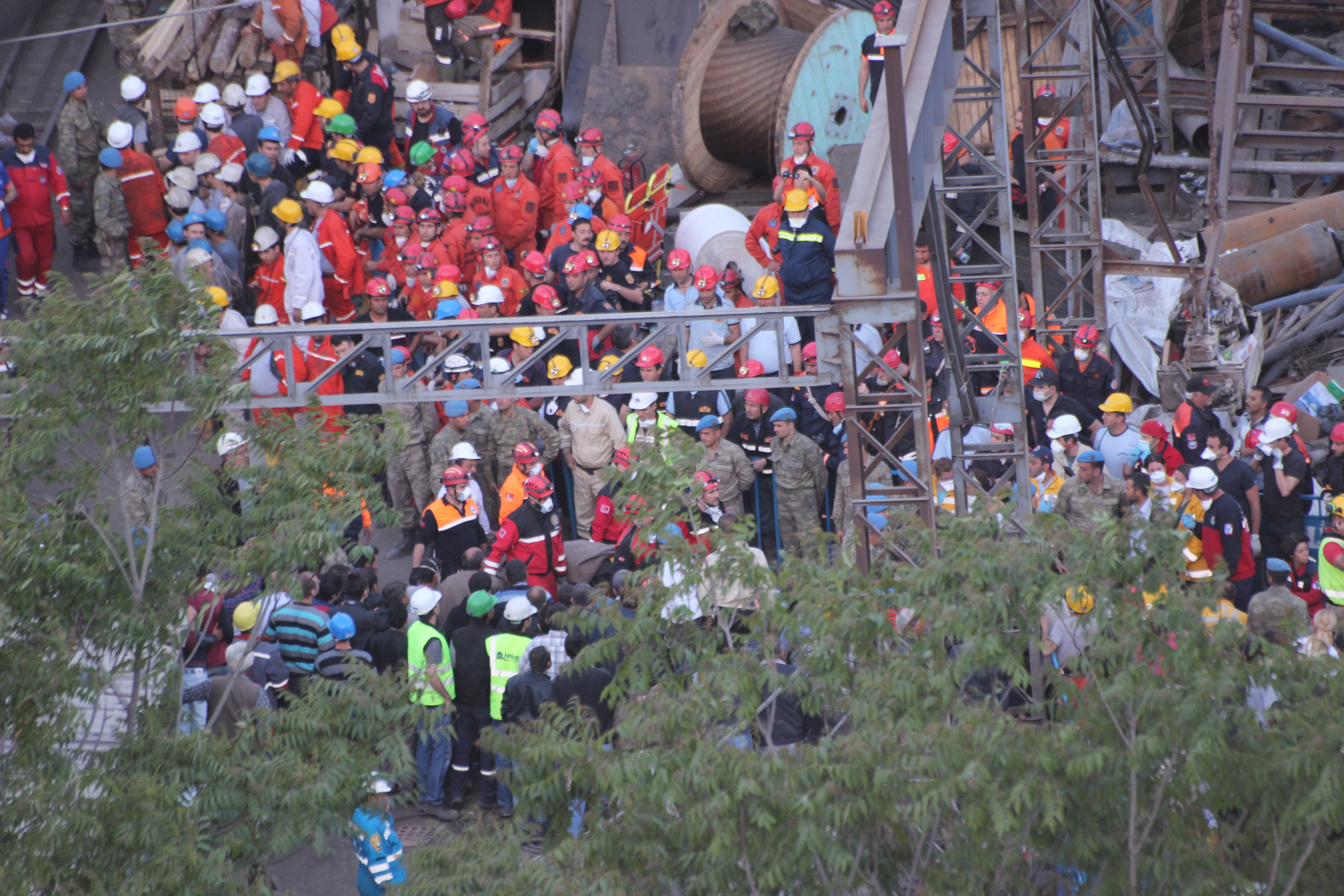
Rescue effort after the Soma mine disaster

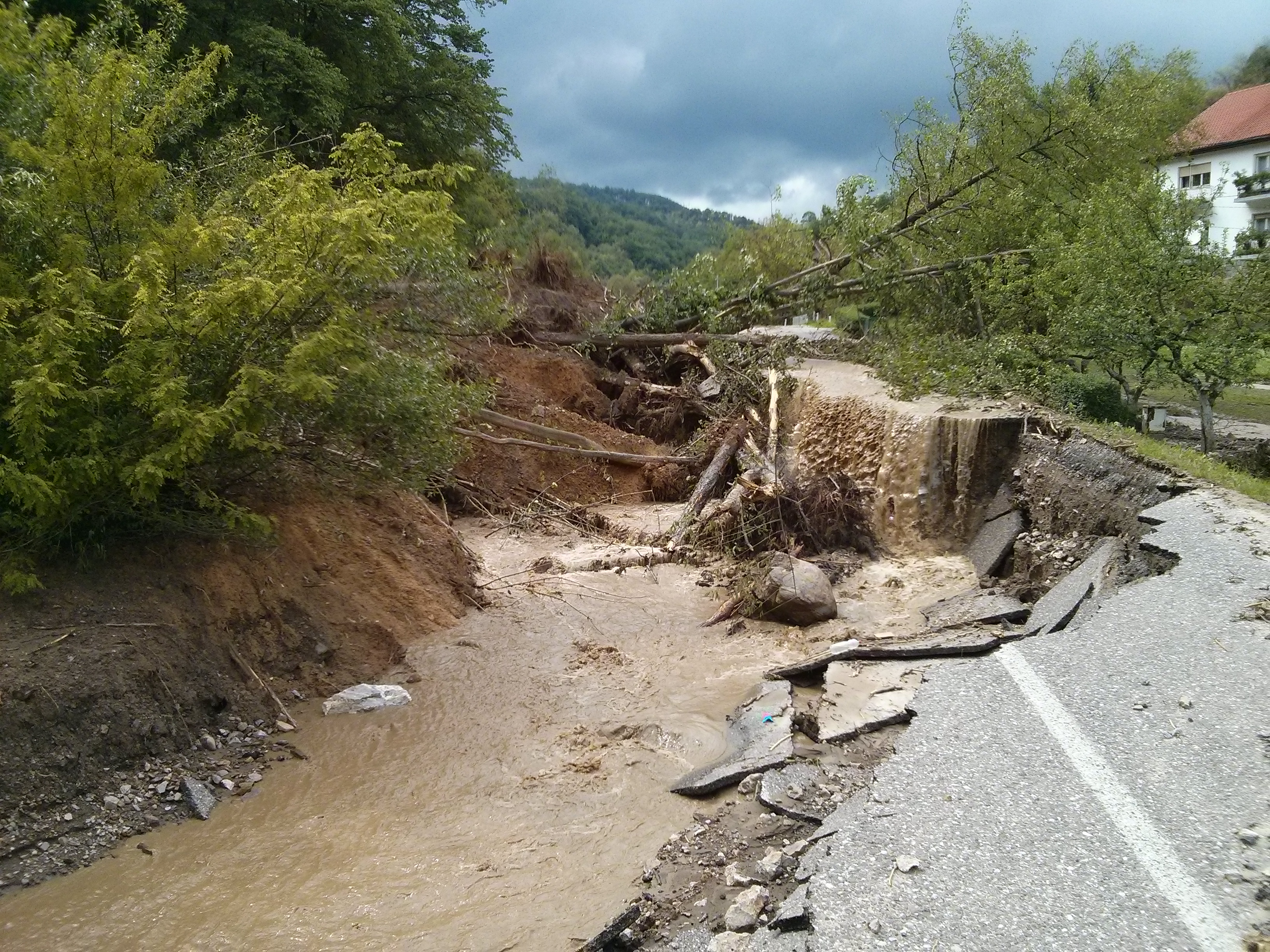
Flooding damage in Krupanj, Serbia

- 1 May – Large demonstrations are organised in major European cities with the occasion of Labor Day. In Moscow, over 100,000 march through the Red Square, reviving a tradition last seen before the collapse of the Soviet Union in 1991. In Istanbul, 90 people are injured and 142 arrested after security forces assault protesters, using water cannons and tear gas.
- 2 May – The Ukrainian government launches an offensive on pro-Russian rebels in Sloviansk while clashes in Odesa kill 46 people.
- 5 May
  - Slovenian Prime Minister Alenka Bratušek resigns after losing the leadership of her party 10 days ago.
  - At least 22 people are dead and seven missing after two boats carrying illegal immigrants collide in the Aegean Sea off the coast of Greece.
- 10 May – "Rise Like a Phoenix" by Austrian singer Conchita Wurst wins the Eurovision Song Contest.
- 12 May – Pro-Russian insurgents in Donetsk and Luhansk declare the cities independent states whilst on choosing to join Russia after controversial hastily arranged referendums.
- 13 May – An explosion and fire in a coal mine in western Turkey kill at least 301 miners and trap dozens more.
- 17 May – At least 80 people are killed after days of heavy rainfall caused widespread flooding in Southeast Europe.
- 20 May – A freight train collides with a passenger train near Moscow, killing at least nine people and injuring 51 others.
- 22 May – At least 16 Ukrainian soldiers are killed by pro-Russian separatists who ambush their checkpoint in Donetsk Oblast. Hours after the assault on the checkpoint, rebel leaders in neighboring Luhansk impose martial law until government troops cease their offensive.
- 24 May
  - Four people are killed in a shooting at the Jewish Museum of Belgium in Brussels.
  - 278 people are injured and dozens of buildings damaged as 6.9 earthquake strikes off Samothrace, Greece.
  - "Winter Sleep", directed by Nuri Bilge Ceylan, wins the Palme d'Or at the Cannes Film Festival.
- 25 May
  - The pro-European businessman Petro Poroshenko wins the presidential election in Ukraine with 56% of the vote.
  - Lithuania's incumbent President Dalia Grybauskaitė declares victory following a second round of voting in the Baltic country's presidential elections.
  - Eurosceptic and far-right parties seize ground in elections to the European parliament, in what France's PM called a "political earthquake".
- 27 May – At least 40 pro-Russian separatists die in fighting over control of Donetsk International Airport.

=== June ===
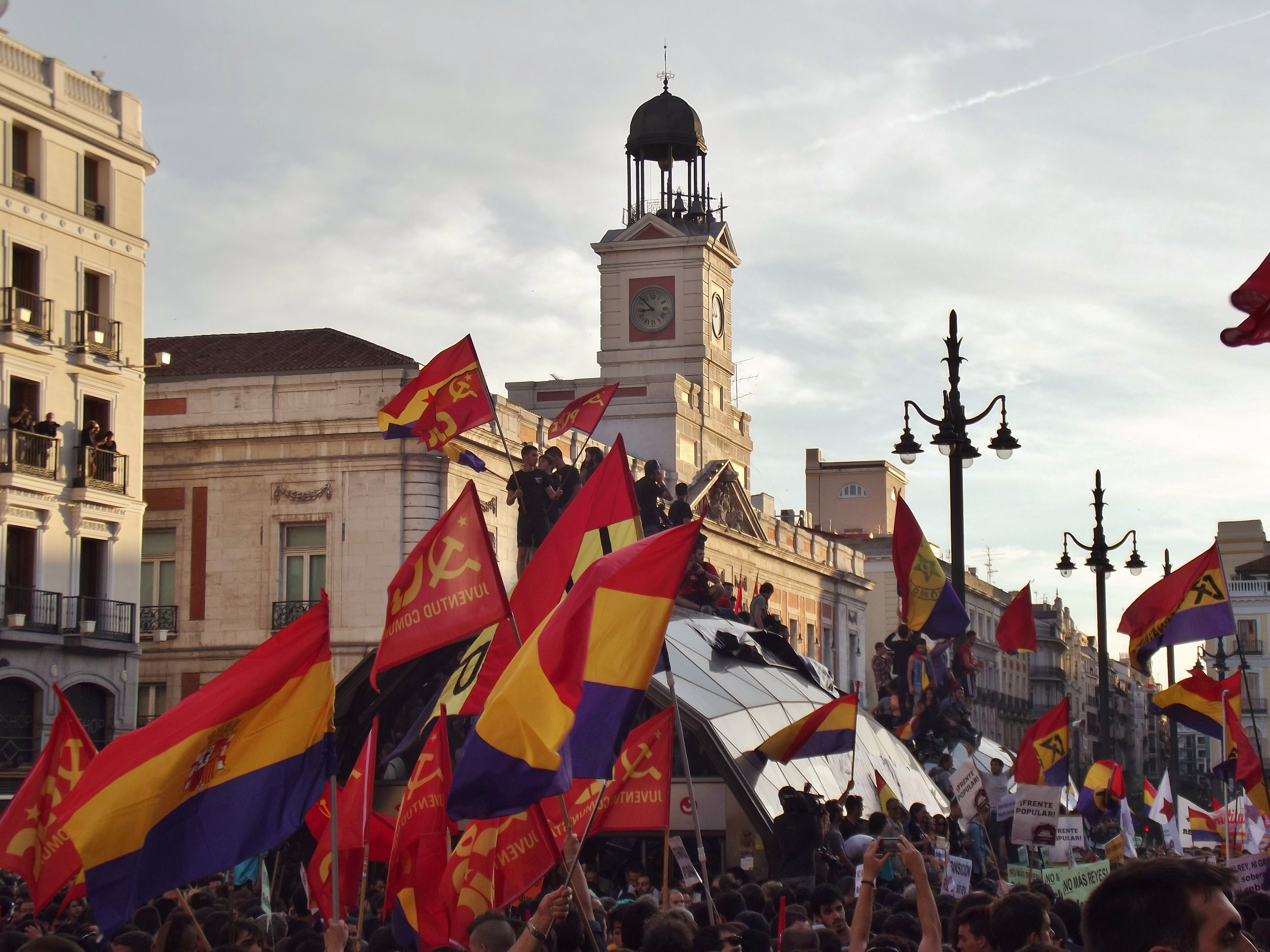
Republican manifestation in Madrid in the aftermath of King Juan Carlos' abdication

- 1 June – Slovenian President Borut Pahor dissolves parliament and schedules an early election for 13 July.
- 2 June – Spain's King Juan Carlos abdicates after 38 years on the throne and his son Prince Felipe will succeed him. The announcement of the abdication is followed by large anti-monarchy demonstrations in Madrid and Barcelona.
- 14 June – A Ukraine military Ilyushin Il-76 airlifter is shot down, killing all 49 people on board.
- 16 June – Russia cuts off gas to Ukraine in a dispute over unpaid bills that could disrupt supplies to the rest of Europe.
- 20 June – At least 14 people are killed and several are missing after torrential rains cause flash flooding in northeastern Bulgaria.
- 27 June – Ukraine, Georgia and Moldova sign the European Union Association Agreement.

=== July ===
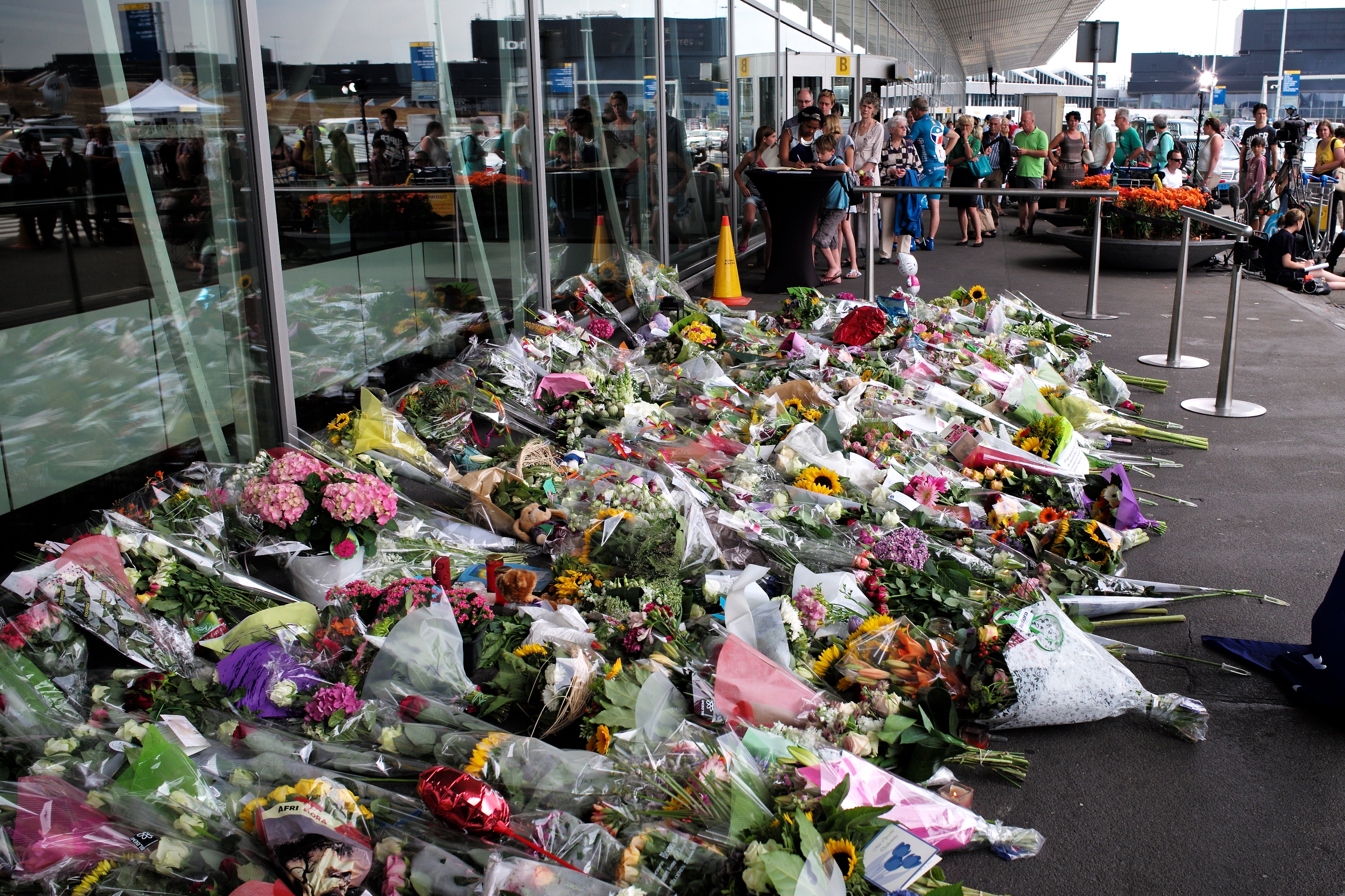
Makeshift memorial at Amsterdam Schiphol Airport for the victims of the Malaysia Airlines Flight 17

- 1 July – Italy takes over the presidency of the European Union.
- 2 July – Two migrant boats capsize in the Mediterranean Sea, resulting in the death of 115 people.
- 15 July
  - 23 people are killed and over 160 injured as several subway cars derail on the Moscow Metro.
  - The European Parliament votes to elect Jean-Claude Juncker as President of the European Commission.
- 17 July – A Malaysian Airlines passenger plane is shot down on the Russian–Ukraine border, killing all 298 people on board.
- 19 July – A crash involving several buses on a highway in eastern Germany kills 10 people and injures 69.
- 23 July – Bulgaria's Prime Minister Plamen Oresharski resigns ahead of snap elections to end months of political turmoil.
- 24 July – Ukraine's Prime Minister Arseny Yatseniuk resigns after the governing coalition collapses.
- 25 July – Ukrainian Deputy Prime Minister for Regional Policy Volodymyr Groysman is appointed as acting prime minister.
- 28 July – The Hague's Permanent Court of Arbitration orders Russia to repay US$50 billion to shareholders of the Yukos Oil Company for breaching the Energy Charter Treaty.

=== August ===
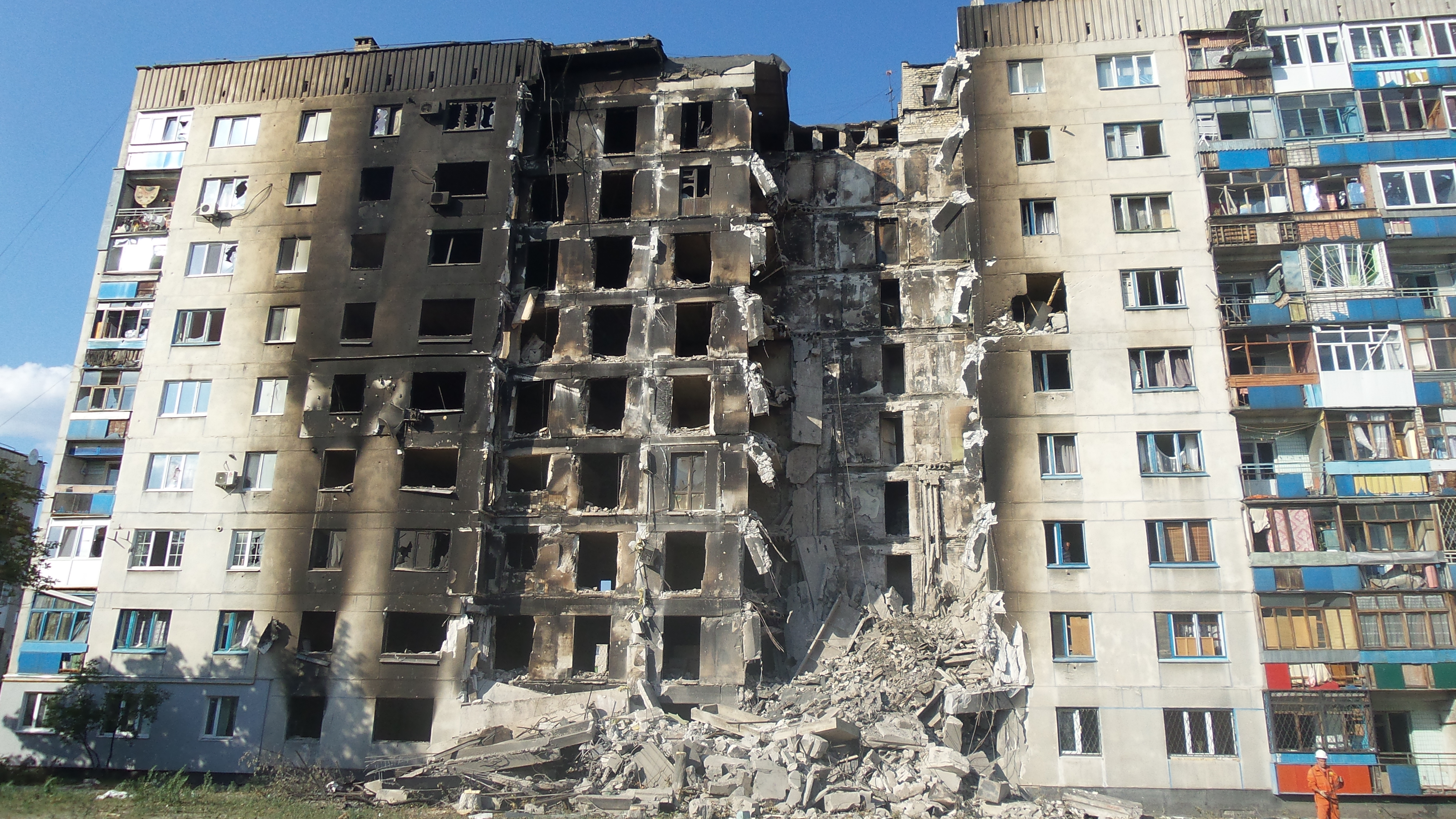
Apartment building in Lysychansk destroyed during the War in Donbas.

- 10 August – Recep Tayyip Erdoğan wins Turkey's first direct presidential election.
- 25 August
  - The Prime Minister of France Manuel Valls presents President François Hollande with the resignation of the cabinet, with a new cabinet to be appointed next day.
  - The President of Ukraine Petro Poroshenko dissolves the Parliament and calls new elections for 26 October.
- 30 August – EU leaders appoint Italy's Federica Mogherini as EU foreign policy chief and Poland's Donald Tusk as European Council president.
- 31 August – Eight people are killed and eleven others injured after an explosion destroys a four-storey building in a suburb of Paris.

=== September ===
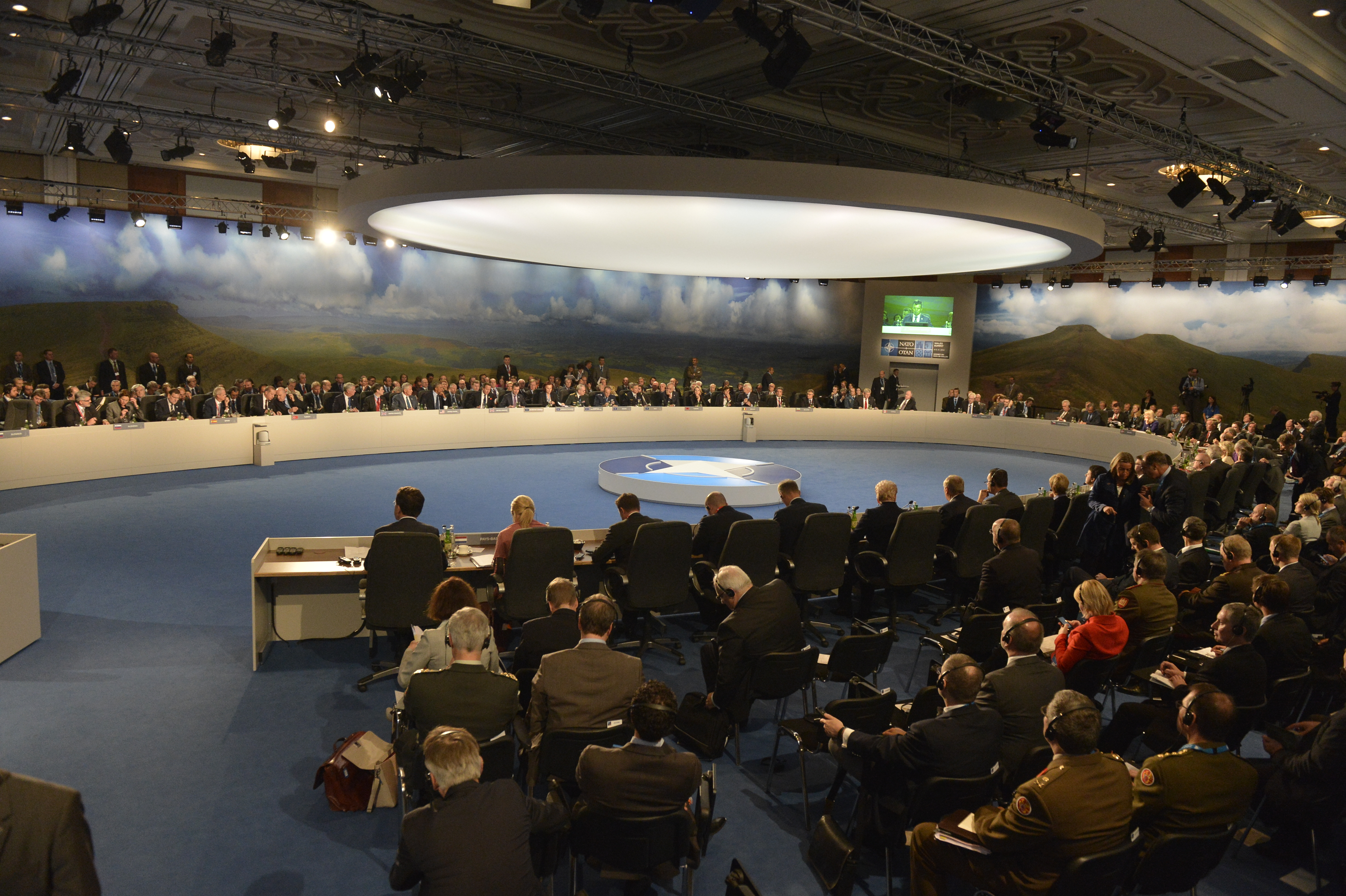
High officials taking part in the NATO Summit of Newport

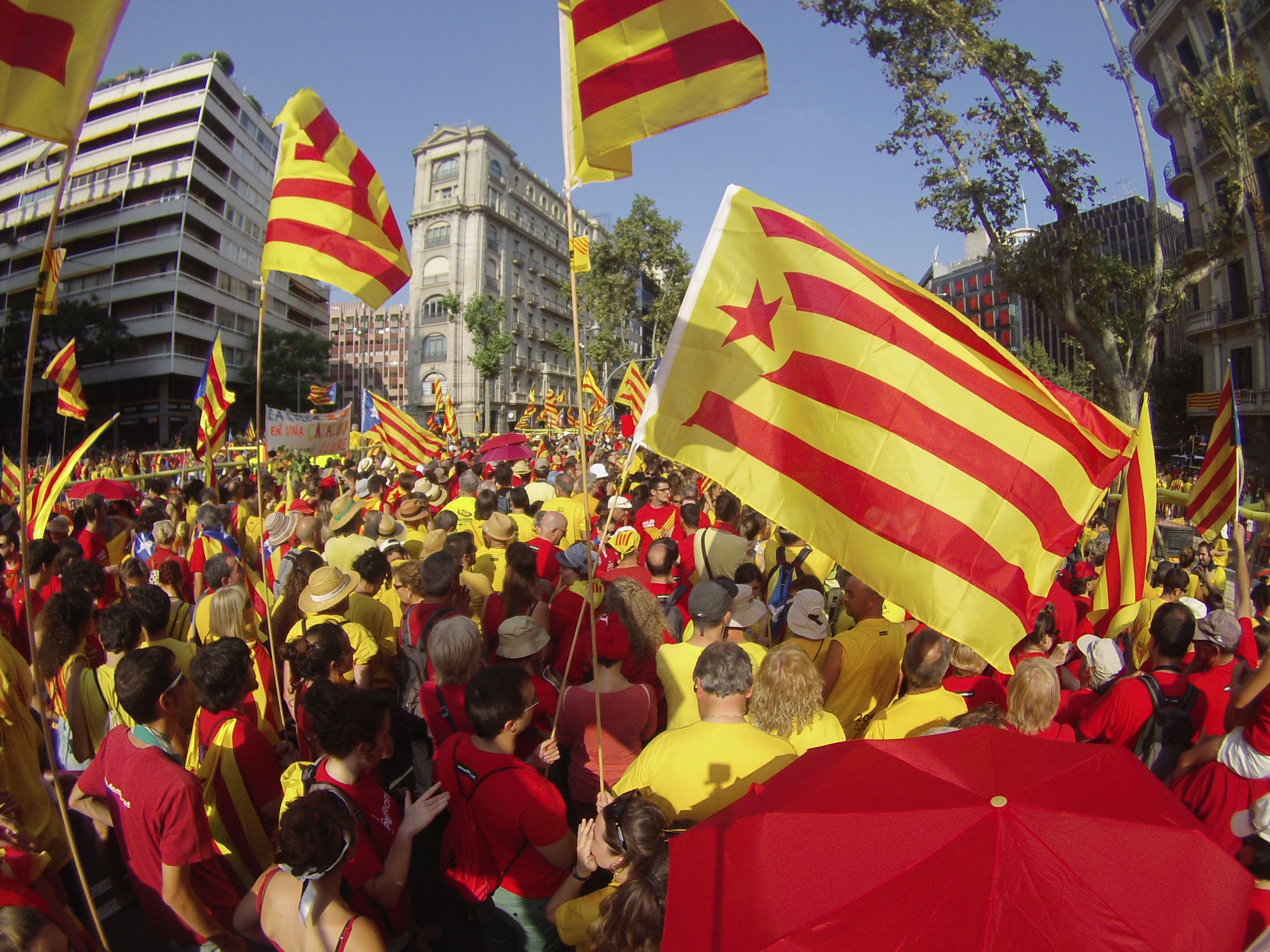
1.8 million people took part in the Catalan Way.

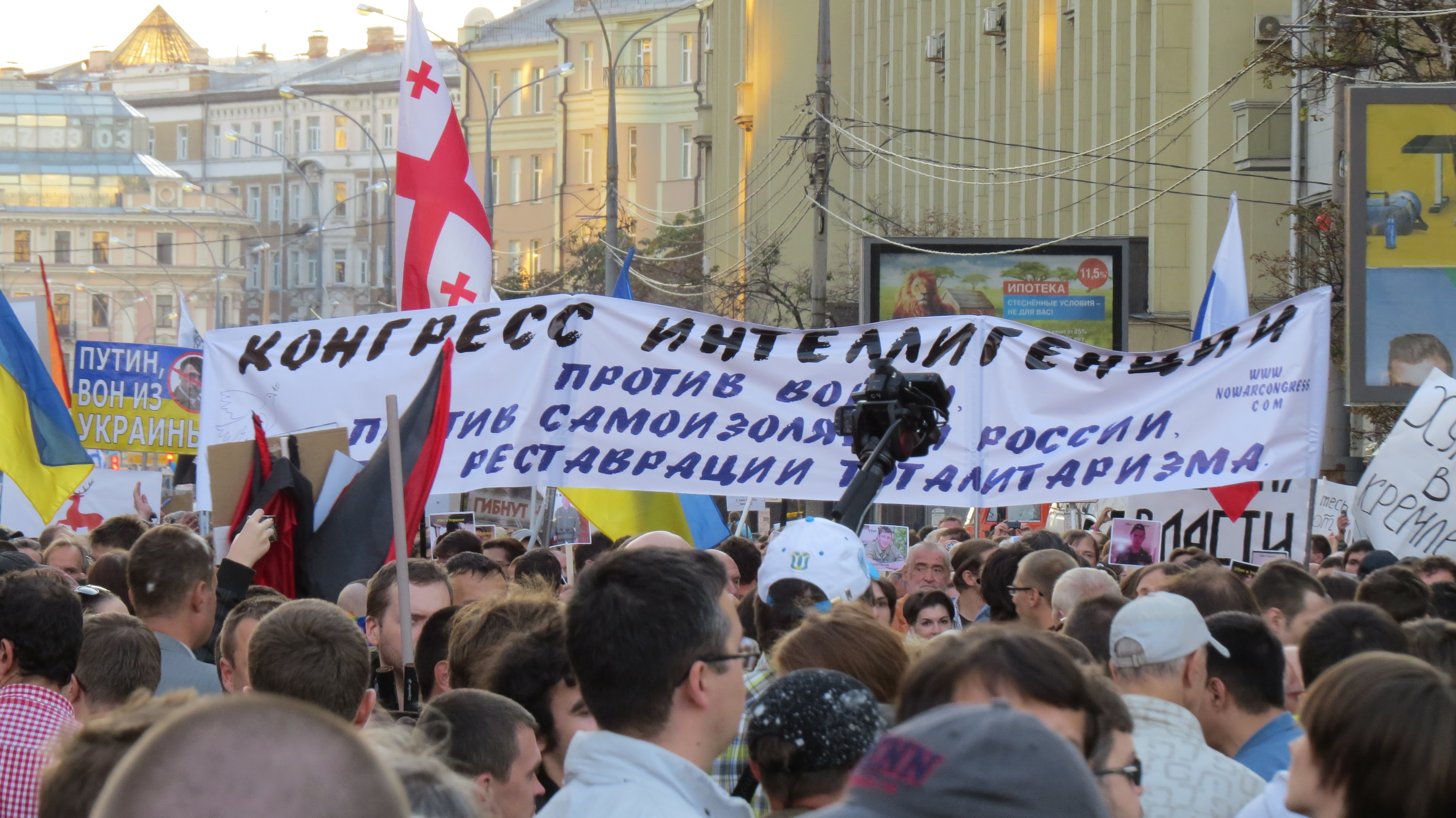
Rally in Moscow against Russian military intervention in Ukraine

- 4 September – Over 150 state leaders and officials participate in the Newport Summit of the North Atlantic Treaty Organization. It is the first time a NATO summit will be held in Britain outside London.
- 11 September
  - About 500 migrants are feared dead after their ship is rammed by another boat near Malta.
  - Up to 1.8 million people form a human chain in the largest demonstration for the independence of Catalonia.
- 14 September – The Social Democrats, led by Stefan Löfven, win a plurality in the Swedish general election.
- 18 September – Scotland votes against independence from the United Kingdom.
- 21 September – More than 26,000 people in Moscow participate in the largest demonstration so far against Russian president Vladimir Putin and the War in Donbas.

=== October ===
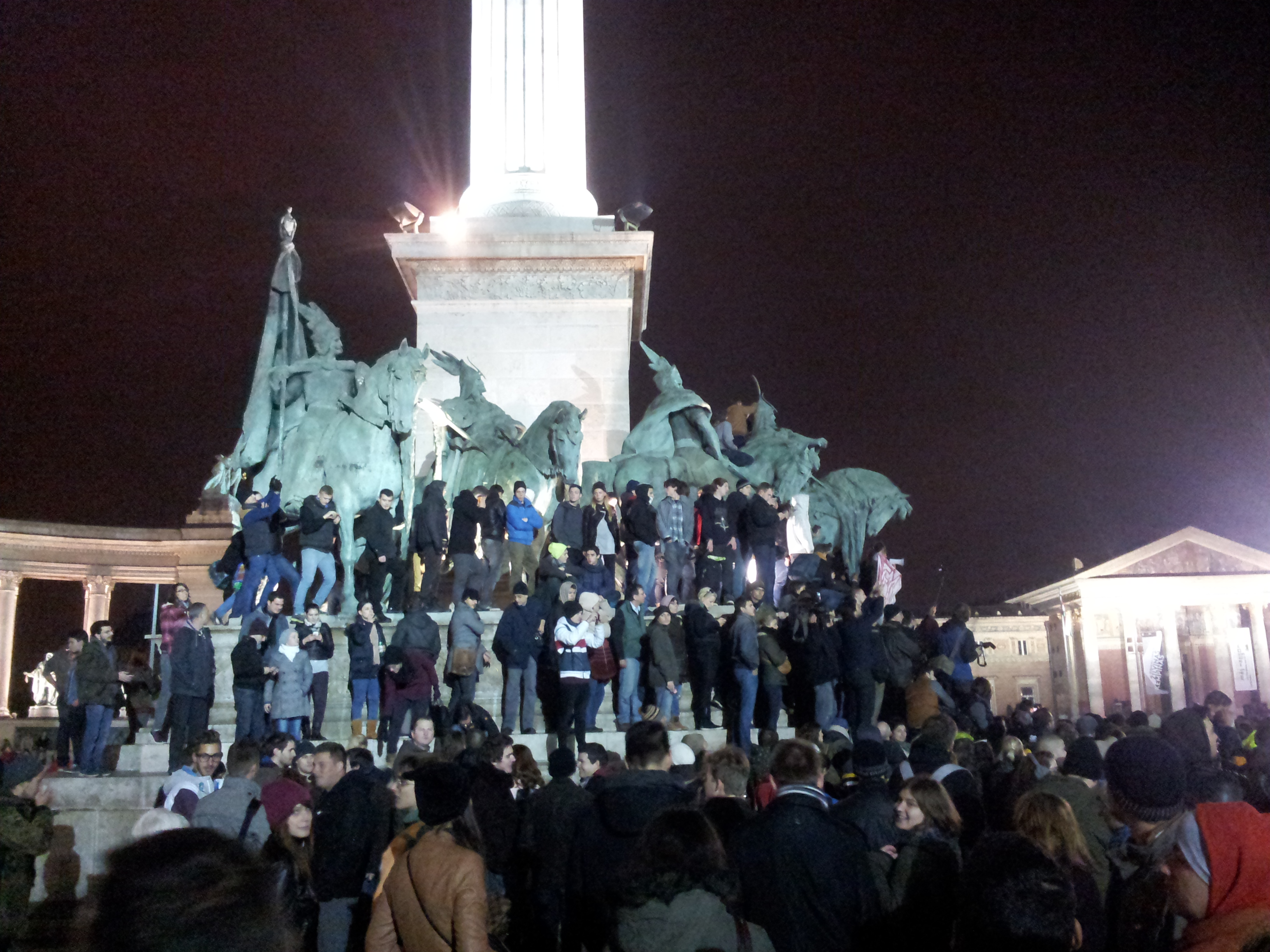
Demonstration against the tax on internet in Budapest, 26 October

- 2 October – A series of powerful blasts at a Bulgarian explosives plant kills 15 employees and injures three others.
- 5 October – A truck enters into a column of 40 cars near Thessaloniki, Greece, killing five people and injuring 32.
- 9 October – Estonia becomes the first former Soviet republic to legalize gay partnerships and grant equal rights to same-sex couples.
- 26 October – Pro-Western parties led by Ukraine's PM and president win almost 50% of the votes in the first parliamentary election after the revolution.
- 29 October – Up to 100,000 Hungarians rally in Budapest despite the government's amendment of a controversial internet tax bill.
- 30 October – Sweden officially recognises Palestine as a sovereign state.

=== November ===
- 2 November – Aleksandr Zakharchenko and Igor Plotnitsky win the general elections held in the self-proclaimed Donetsk and Luhansk People's Republics. Ukraine, the European Parliament and the United States don't recognize these elections.
- 3 November – At least 24 migrants die after their boat sinks in Bosphorus Strait near Istanbul.
- 16 November – Klaus Iohannis becomes the first ethnic German President of Romania.
- 30 November – Pro-European parties in Moldova win a narrow majority of votes in a strongly contested parliamentary election.

=== December ===
- 2 December – French Parliament votes for the recognition of the State of Palestine.
- 4 December – Gunmen attack a police post and storm a building in Grozny, capital of Russia's southern province of Chechnya, killing 10 policemen in clashes in which 10 of the attackers are also killed.
- 17 December – European Parliament adopts the resolution on recognition of Palestine statehood by 498 votes in favour.
- 27 December – Andrei Kobyakov replaces Mikhail Myasnikovich as Belarus' new prime minister in the biggest government reshuffle since 2010.
- 29 December – Five people are killed and 414 evacuated as ferry catches fire in the Ionian Sea.

== Deaths ==
=== January ===
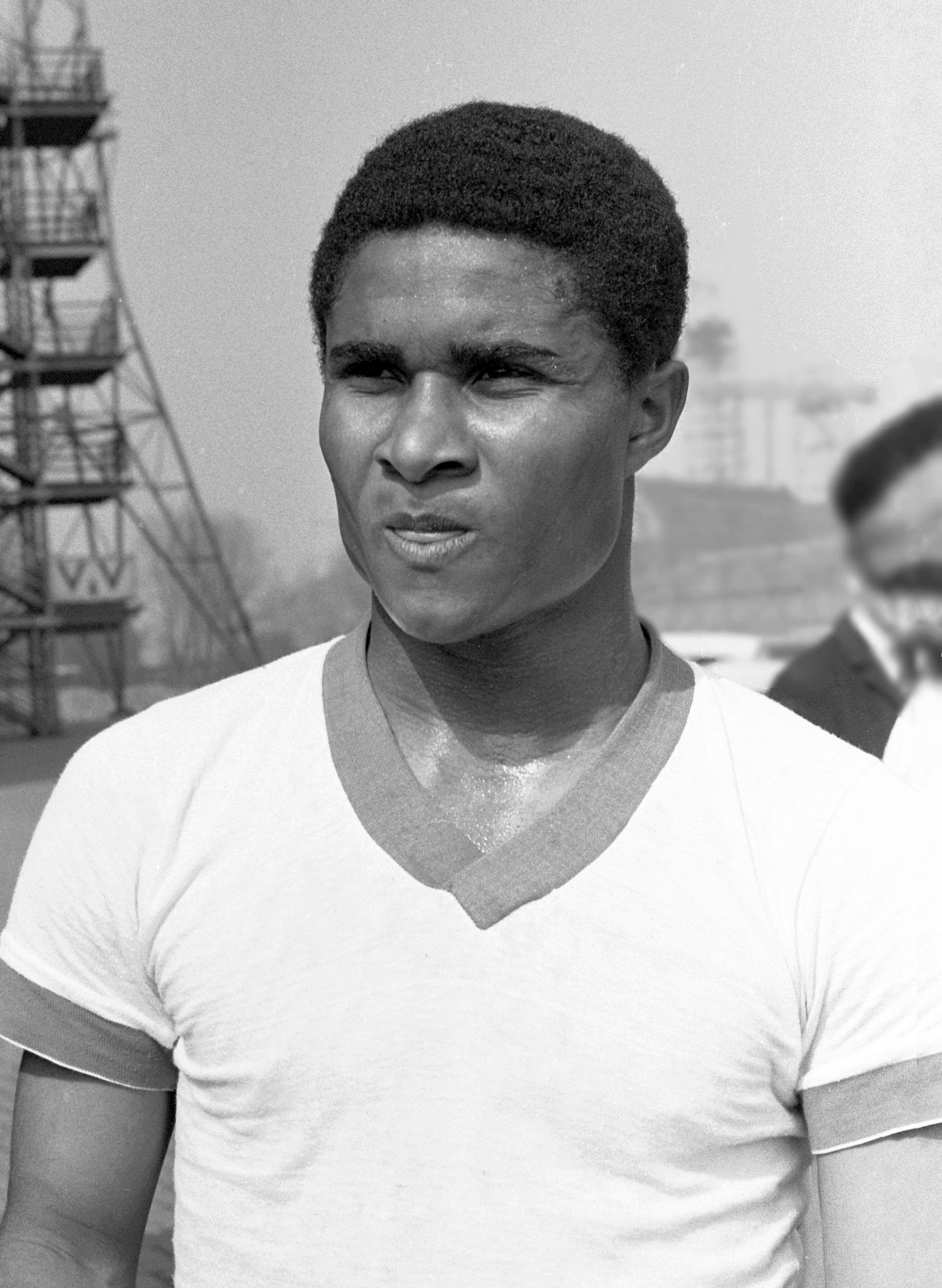
Eusébio

- 5 January – Eusébio, 71, Portuguese footballer (b. 1942)
- 10 January – Zbigniew Messner, 84, 9th Prime Minister of the People's Republic of Poland (b. 1929)
- 11 January - Vugar Gashimov, 27, Azerbaijani chess grandmaster (b. 1986)
- 16 January – Roger Lloyd-Pack, 69, English actor (b. 1944)
- 20 January – Claudio Abbado, 80, Italian conductor (b. 1933)
- 23 January – Riz Ortolani, 87, Italian film composer (b. 1926)
- 25 January – Gyula Sax, 62, Hungarian chess grandmaster (b. 1951)
- 31 January – Miklós Jancsó, 92, Hungarian film director and screenwriter (b. 1921)

=== February ===
- 1 February
  - Luis Aragonés, 75, Spanish footballer and manager (b. 1938)
  - Maximilian Schell, 83, Austrian-Swiss film and stage actor (b. 1930)
- 10 February
  - Stuart Hall, 82, Jamaican-British sociologist (b. 1932)
- 11 February – Alice Babs, 90, Swedish singer and actress (b. 1924)
- 13 February – Richard Møller Nielsen, 76, Danish footballer and manager (b. 1937)
- 14 February – Tom Finney, 91, English footballer (b. 1922)
- 23 February – Alice Herz-Sommer, 110, Czech-British pianist, world's oldest Holocaust survivor (b. 1903)
- 25 February - Mario Coluna, 78, Mozambican-born Portuguese footballer (b. 1935)
- 26 February – Paco de Lucía, 66, Spanish flamenco composer, guitarist and producer (b. 1947)

=== March ===
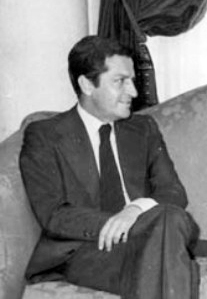
Adolfo Suárez

- 1 March – Alain Resnais, 91, French film director (b. 1922)
- 12 March – Věra Chytilová, 85, Czech film director (b. 1929)
- 14 March – Tony Benn, 88, British politician and diarist (b. 1925)
- 23 March – Adolfo Suárez, 81, 138th Prime Minister of Spain (b. 1932)

=== April ===
- 1 April – Jacques Le Goff, 90, French historian and author (b. 1924)
- 2 April – Urs Widmer, 75, Swiss novelist, playwright and essayist (b. 1938)
- 8 April – Karlheinz Deschner, 89, German researcher and writer (b. 1924)
- 10 April – Sue Townsend, 68, English writer and humorist (b. 1946)
- 24 April
  - Hans Hollein, 80, Austrian architect and designer (b. 1934)
  - Tadeusz Różewicz, 92, Polish poet, dramatist and writer (b. 1921)
- 27 April – Vujadin Boškov, 82, Serbian footballer and coach (b. 1931)
- 29 April – Bob Hoskins, 71, English actor (b. 1942)

=== May ===
- 4 May – Elena Baltacha, 30, Ukrainian-born British professional tennis player (b. 1983)
- 12 May
  - Marco Cé, 88, Italian Cardinal of the Catholic Church (b. 1925)
  - H. R. Giger, 74, Swiss surrealist painter, sculptor and set designer (b. 1940)
- 15 May – Jean-Luc Dehaene, 73, 63rd Prime Minister of Belgium (b. 1940)
- 18 May
  - Dobrica Ćosić, 92, Serbian writer and 1st President of the Federal Republic of Yugoslavia (b. 1921)
  - Wubbo Ockels, 68, Dutch physicist and astronaut (b. 1946)
- 25 May – Wojciech Jaruzelski, 90, Polish military officer and communist politician (b. 1923)
- 29 May – Karlheinz Böhm, 86, Austrian actor (b. 1928)

=== June ===
- 1 June – Valentin Mankin, 75, Ukrainian Olympic sailor (b. 1938)
- 8 June – Alexander Imich, 111, Polish-born American chemist, parapsychologist and supercentenarian (b. 1903)
- 9 June – Rik Mayall, 56, English comedian, writer, actor and voice-over artist (b. 1958)
- 11 June – Rafael Frühbeck de Burgos, 80, Spanish conductor and composer (b. 1933)
- 13 June – Gyula Grosics, 88, Hungarian footballer and manager (b. 1926)
- 25 June – Ana María Matute, 88, Spanish writer (b. 1925)
- 30 June – Željko Šturanović, 54, Prime Minister of Montenegro (2006–08) (b. 1960)

=== July ===
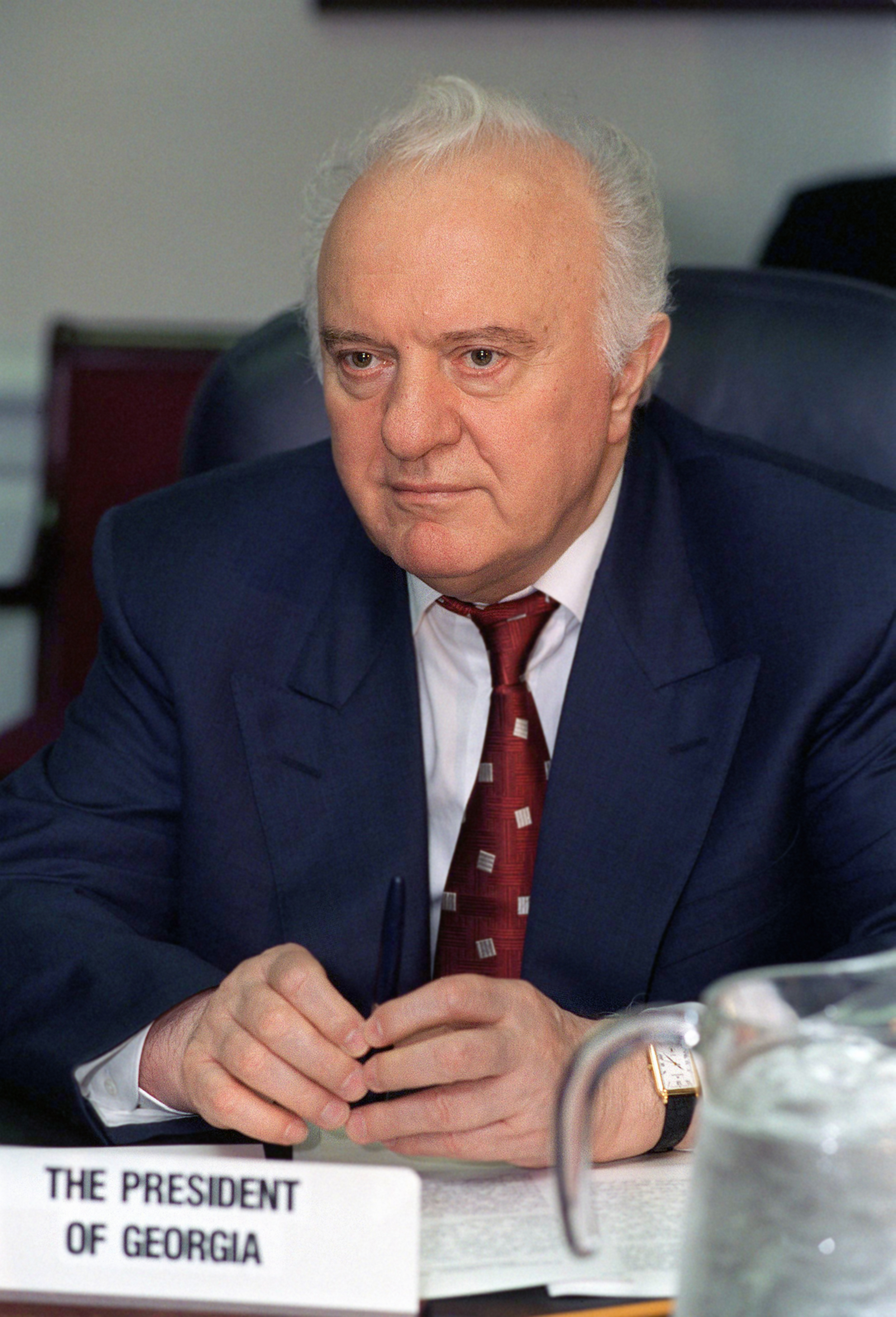
Eduard Shevardnadze

- 7 July
  - Alfredo Di Stéfano, 88, Argentine-Spanish footballer and coach (b. 1926)
  - Eduard Shevardnadze, 86, 2nd President of Georgia (b. 1928)
- 11 July – Tommy Ramone, 65, Hungarian-American record producer and musician (b. 1949)
- 13 July – Lorin Maazel, 84, French-American conductor, violinist and composer (b. 1930)
- 25 July – Carlo Bergonzi, 90, Italian operatic tenor (b. 1924)
- 27 July – Francesco Marchisano, 85, Italian cardinal (b. 1929)

=== August ===
- 1 August – Valyantsin Byalkevich, 41, Belarusian footballer and manager (b. 1973)
- 9 August – Andriy Bal, 56, Ukrainian footballer and coach (b. 1958)
- 11 August
  - Vladimir Beara, 85, Croatian footballer and manager (b. 1928)
  - Pierre Ryckmans, 78, Belgian-Australian writer, sinologist, essayist and literary critic (b. 1935)
- 13 August – Frans Brüggen, 79, Dutch conductor, recorder player and baroque flautist (b. 1934)
- 15 August – Licia Albanese, 105, Italian-born American operatic soprano (b. 1909)
- 21 August – Albert Reynolds, 81, Taoiseach of Ireland (b. 1932)
- 24 August – Richard Attenborough, 90, English actor and film director (b. 1923)
- 28 August – Glenn Cornick, 67, English bass guitarist (b. 1947)
- 29 August – Björn Waldegård, 70, Swedish rally driver (b. 1943)

=== September ===
- 1 September – Gottfried John, 72, German actor (b. 1942)
- 4 September – Donatas Banionis, 90, Lithuanian actor (b. 1924)
- 5 September – Wolfhart Pannenberg, 85, German theologian (b. 1928)
- 6 September – Kira Zvorykina, 94, Belarusian chess player (b. 1919)
- 8 September – Magda Olivero, 104, Italian operatic soprano (b. 1910)
- 12 September – Ian Paisley, 88, British politician and First Minister of Northern Ireland (b. 1926)
- 15 September – Nicholas Romanov, Prince of Russia, 91 (b. 1922)
- 17 September – Andriy Husin, 41, professional Ukrainian football player and coach (b. 1972)
- 20 September – Anatoly Berezovoy, 72, Soviet cosmonaut (b. 1942)
- 24 September – Christopher Hogwood, 73, English conductor, harpsichordist, writer and musicologist (b. 1941)
- 25 September
  - Sulejman Tihić, 62, Bosnian politician (b. 1951)
  - Dorothy Tyler-Odam, 94, British athlete (b. 1920)
- 28 September – Dannie Abse, 91, Welsh poet (b. 1923)

=== October ===
- 2 October – György Lázár, 90, Hungarian Communist politician and Chairman of the Council of Ministers (1975–87) (b. 1924)
- 4 October – Fyodor Cherenkov, 55, Russian footballer and manager (b. 1959)
- 5 October
  - Andrea de Cesaris, 55, Italian race car driver (b. 1959)
  - Yuri Lyubimov, 97, Russian stage actor and director (b. 1917)
- 6 October – Igor Mitoraj, 70, Polish sculptor (b. 1944)
- 7 October – Siegfried Lenz, 88, German writer (b. 1926)
- 16 October – John Spencer-Churchill, 11th Duke of Marlborough, 88, British peer and educator (b. 1926)
- 23 October – Tullio Regge, 83, Italian theoretical physicist (b. 1931)
- 25 October – Jack Bruce, 71, Scottish musician and composer (b. 1943)
- 29 October
  - Rainer Hasler, 56, Liechtensteiner footballer (b. 1958)
  - Klas Ingesson, 46, Swedish footballer and manager (b. 1968)

=== November ===
- 2 November
  - Acker Bilk, 85, English clarinettist and vocalist (b. 1929)
  - Veljko Kadijević, 88, general of the Yugoslav People's Army (b. 1925)
- 12 November – Warren Clarke, 67, English actor (b. 1947)
- 13 November – Alexander Grothendieck, 86, German-born French mathematician (b. 1928)
- 14 November – Eugene Dynkin, 90, Russian-American mathematician and academic (b. 1924)
- 16 November – Serge Moscovici, 89, Romanian-born French social psychologist (b. 1925)
- 19 November – Mike Nichols, 83, German-born American film and theatre director, producer, actor and comedian (b. 1931)
- 20 November – Cayetana Fitz-James Stuart, 18th Duchess of Alba, 88, Spanish aristocrat (b. 1926)
- 22 November – Fiorenzo Angelini, 98, Italian Cardinal of the Roman Catholic Church (b. 1916)
- 24 November – Viktor Tikhonov, 84, Soviet ice hockey player and coach (b. 1930)
- 27 November – P. D. James, 94, English writer and life peer (b. 1920)

=== December ===
- 3 December
  - Jacques Barrot, 77, French politician, European Commissioner for Justice (2008–10) (b. 1937)
  - Ian McLagan, 69, English keyboard instrumentalist (b. 1945)
- 5 December – Queen Fabiola of Belgium, 86 (b. 1928)
- 8 December – Knut Nystedt, 99, Norwegian composer (b. 1915)
- 18 December – Virna Lisi, 78, Italian actress (b. 1936)
- 21 December
  - Åke Johansson, 86, Swedish footballer (b. 1928)
  - Udo Jurgens, 80, Austrian composer and singer (b. 1934)
  - Billie Whitelaw, 82, English actress (b. 1932)
- 22 December – Joe Cocker, 70, English singer (b. 1944)
- 26 December – Leo Tindemans, 92, 43rd Prime Minister of Belgium (b. 1922)
- 27 December – Tomaz Salamun, 73, Slovenian poet (b. 1941)
- 30 December – Luise Rainer, 104, German-born American actress (b. 1910)
- 31 December – Valerian Wellesley, 8th Duke of Wellington (b. 1915)

== See also ==
- 2014 in the European Union
- List of state leaders in 2014 § Europe
