= Immortal Bach =

Musical composition by Knut Nystedt

- by Knut Nystedt
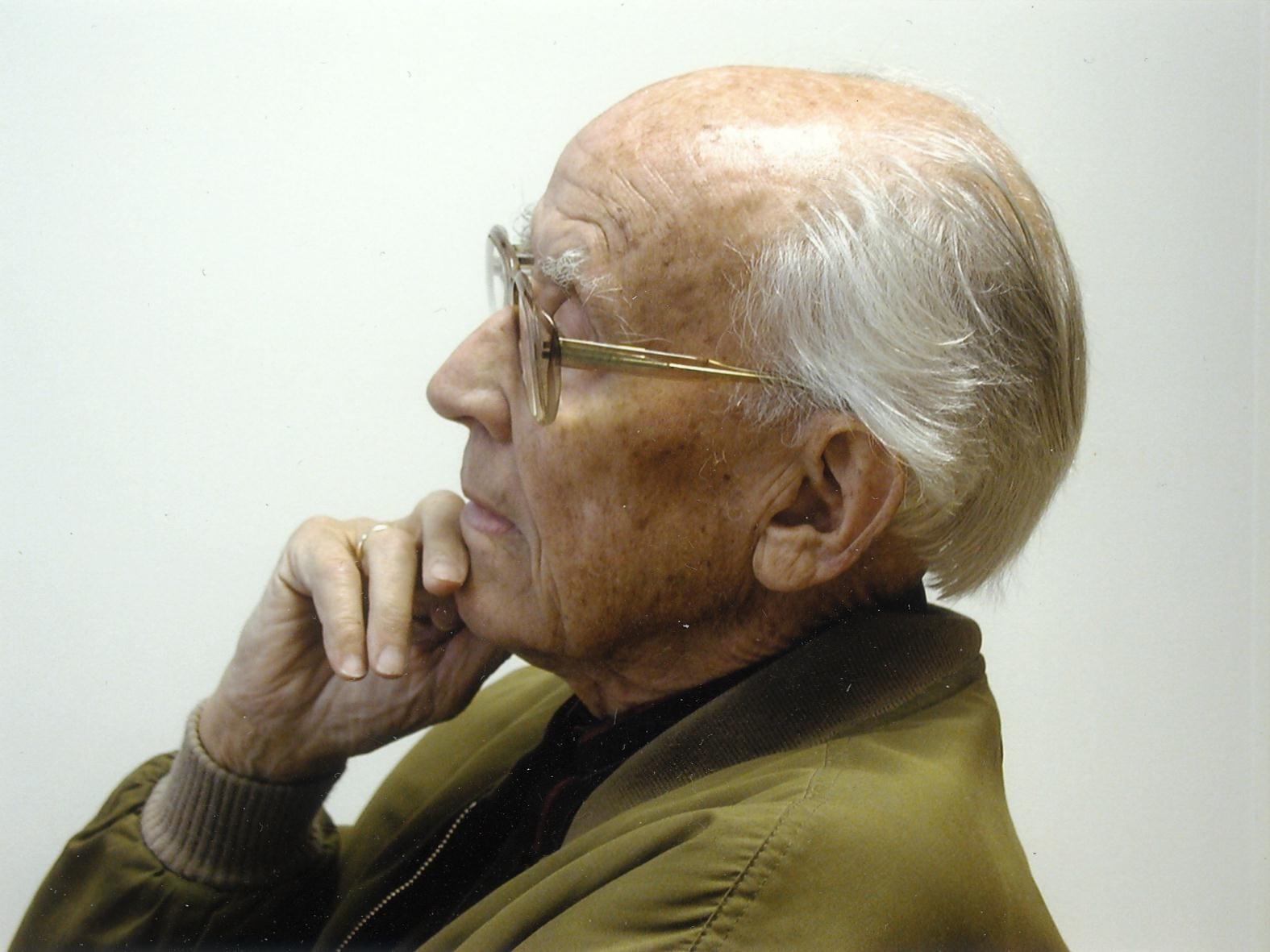
- The composer in 2007
- Opus: 153
- Language: German
- Based on: "Komm, süßer Tod"
- Composed: 1987
- Published: 1988
- Vocal: SATB choir

Immortal Bach, Op. 153, is a choral composition from 1988 by Knut Nystedt, derived from the first line of Bach's funeral song "Komm, süßer Tod" (Come, sweet death). He scored it for mixed choir a cappella divided among many individual voices.

== Background ==
The Norwegian composer Knut Nystedt grew up in a Christian family, where hymns and classical music were part of everyday life. In 1950, he founded a vocal ensemble, Det Norske Solistkor, which he conducted until 1990. Among his roughly 300 choral compositions, which account for three quarters of his works, he wrote several pieces of sacred music, including De Profundis, Op. 54, a 1966 setting of Psalm 130, and Missa brevis, Op. 102, in 1984. In 1987, he derived Immortal Bach from the first line of Johann Sebastian Bach's setting of the funeral song "Komm, süßer Tod". It was published in 1999 by Norsk Musikforlag in Oslo. Immortal Bach was the last piece Nystedt conducted with Det Norske Solistkor before he retired.

== Music ==
Immortal Bach is an arrangement of the first line of Bach's four-part setting of the funeral song "Komm, süßer Tod". The song for a singer and basso continuo appeared in Schemellis Gesangbuch, BWV 478. The text of the first eight measures which Nystedt used is "Komm, süßer Tod. Komm, sel'ge Ruh'. Komm führe mich in Friede." (Come, sweet death. Come, blessed rest. Come and lead me to peace.) Nystedt harmonised the bassline to a four-part setting a cappella. The choir first sings this setting. What follows is an arrangement scheme, according to which the singers perform the same music, but in different tempi. In the first and third phrase, all voices begin together and hold the first note for a long time until each voice moves forward in different tempi, and all wait at the end of the phrase until united again. The second phrase is treated slightly differently: the sopranos alone enter on a forceful high note, while the lower voices enter together moments later, continuing together from there as in the other phrases. The work begins and ends pianissimo. Nystedt recommended to place the singers surrounding the audience.

Vladimir Morosan, a Russian composer and musicologist with a focus on sacred choral music, wrote liner notes for Hyperion Records and described the result as "theology expressed in sound", giving meaning to the phrase "time-less", and as a "glimpse ... of eternity".

== Recordings ==
"Immortal Bach" concludes the record Immortal Nystedt, recorded by Norwegian chamber choir Ensemble 96 (conductor Øystein Fevang). The record received two Grammy nominations, and MusicWeb International wrote: "This arrangement is not obvious in vanilla stereo but, goodness, there are some astonishingly long, sustained choral passages that must require phenomenal breath control. The organ-like sonorities that result are most impressive and a reminder, if it were needed, that this is a choir of considerable talent."

Nystedt's vocal ensemble, Det Norske Solistkor, recorded music by Bach and Nystedt in 2015, conducted by Grete Pedersen, concluding with Immortal Bach. A reviewer called the piece "an amazingly challenging essay in soft, sustained vocal sound".
