= Zürcher Vokalisten =

Swiss a cappella choir

The a cappella choir Zürcher Vokalisten was founded in Zurich, Switzerland, in 2002 by its current director Christian Dillig. The choir comprises about 30 singers. Its repertoire includes both classical and contemporary music and has been described as spanning "from the Renaissance to the present, from jazz to Rossini".

In 2013, at the third national choral competition in Fribourg, the Zürcher Vokalisten shared the Prix Helvetic for the best non-Fribourg choir with the singing school Cantiamo Oberwallis. In 2013, the label Spektral published the choir's first CD "Blue Bird".

Notable performances by the Zürcher Vokalisten include:

- A 2014 performance themed around William Shakespeare for his 450th birthday anniversary.
- A 2014 performance of Immortal Bach by Knut Nystedt, which was described as "clean" and "sonorous".
- A 2015 performance of Rachmaninoff's Opus 37 in Lenzburg, which the choir "made the work a great experience in all its colors"; the audience reportedly requested two encores.
