= 2014 Aegean Sea yacht and dinghy capsizing =

Capsizing of migrant boats in the Aegean Sea

2014 Aegean Sea/Samos Capsizing
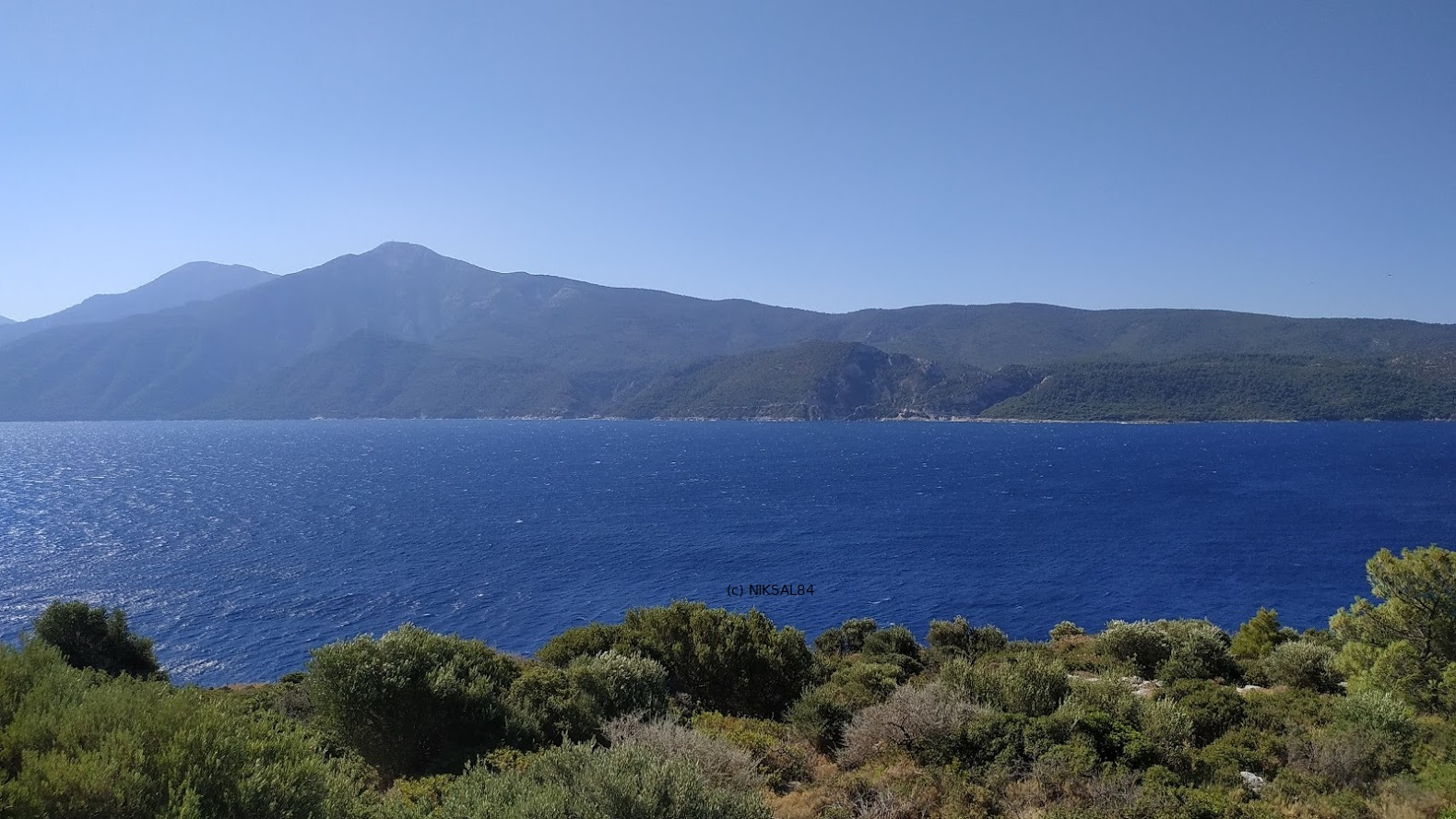
- Coastland in Samos, Greece.
- Date: May 5, 2014
- Location: Aegean Sea, off the coast of the Greek island of Samos, near Turkey; 37.61146°N 26.88483°E
- Deaths: At least 22
- Missing: Up to 7

On 5 May 2014, a yacht and a dinghy, both overcrowded and carrying migrants destined for Greece, capsized about four nautical miles off the coast of the Greek island of Samos, in the Aegean Sea. The vessels had been trying to enter Greece illegally at the time they overturned. The cause of the capsizing remains unclear, since weather conditions at the time and place where it occurred were said to have been relatively good.

== Details and casualties ==
The two boats were carrying an estimated 68 people. Officials stated that 36 of the rescued were from Somalia, Eritrea, and Syria, and that the 22 lost—including a family trapped in a flooded cabin—were probably from the same countries.

At the time, Nicholas Paphitis of the Associated Press said that Samos is "a favorite destination for migrant-smuggling gangs because it's close to the Turkish coast." Paphitis also reported that "up to seven" people were missing, but quoted Hellenic Coast Guard spokesman Nikos Lagadianos as saying, "We can't give a precise number of missing people with any certainty."

== Reactions ==
The United Nations High Commissioner for Refugees reacted to the news by saying that they were "deeply saddened" by the deaths, and appealed to European governments to seek "legal migration alternatives" for people fleeing war zones.

A pair of Samos residents who watched the boats capsize wrote an article for Greek Reporter in which they stated, "That such highly vulnerable people seeking refuge and safety are compelled to travel in small boats at high cost is entirely due to the inhumanity of the EU policies and practices with respect to migration in general and refugees in particular."
