= Missa brevis (Nystedt) =

Musical composition by Knut Nystedt

- by Knut Nystedt
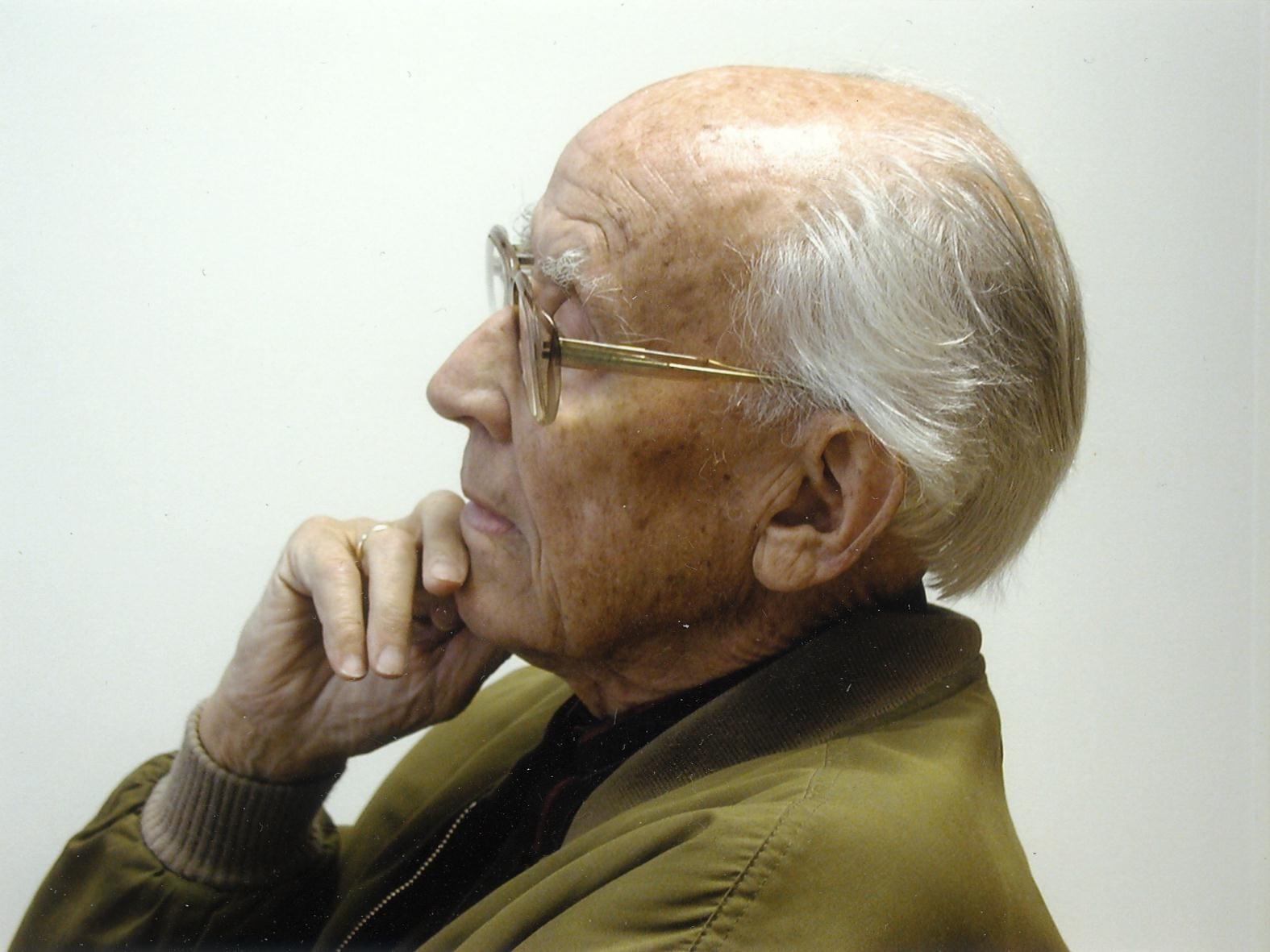
- The composer in 2007
- Opus: 102
- Text: Mass Ordinary
- Language: Latin
- Composed: 1984
- Published: 1985
- Movements: Five
- Vocal: SATB choir

The Missa brevis, Op. 102, is a Latin mass of short duration composed by Knut Nystedt in 1984. He scored it for a mixed choir a cappella. It was also published by Carus-Verlag in 2003.

== Background ==
The Norwegian composer Knut Nystedt grew up in a Christian family, where hymns and classical music were part of everyday life. Among roughly 300 choral compositions, which account for three quarters of his works, he wrote several pieces of sacred music, including De Profundis, Op. 54, a 1966 setting of Psalm 130, and Immortal Bach for five choirs, based on Bach's "Komm, süßer Tod". He composed the Missa brevis in 1984. It was first published by Roberton Publications (later named Norsk Musikkforlag) in 1985, and again by Carus-Verlag in 2003.

== Structure and music ==
Nystedt set the complete Latin mass text but in a concise way, therefore calling it Missa brevis (short mass). He wrote the mass for mixed choir a capella. He structured the text in the usual five movements, which he simply provided with metronome figures instead of verbal tempo markings:

1. Kyrie
2. Gloria
3. Credo
4. Sanctus – Benedictus
5. Agnus Dei

All parts are divided at times. The Kyrie begins with dissonant tension. In the Gloria, Nystedt follows the text in complex rhythm. The Credo contrasts the different aspects of the text. The Sanctus begins with chord clusters. Agnus Dei is contemplative and ends in a simple "dona nobis pacem".

The duration is given as 15 minutes.

== Performances and recordings ==
The mass has become popular for church services and concerts. Parts of it were included in a list of compulsory pieces for a 2018 choir competition.

In 2012, it was recorded by the Kuopio Academic Chamber Choir, conducted by Heikki Liimola, as part of the collection Uusi laulu laulakaa (Sing a New Song) of music by mostly Scandinavian composers such as Erkki Tuppurainen and Einojuhani Rautavaara. It was recorded in 2017 by the Deutscher Jugendkammerchor chamber choir as the final part of the collection Nachtschichten (Night shifts), which also includes works by Brahms and Reger, Ravel's Trois Chansons and Arvo Pärt's The Deer's Cry.
