= Øystein Fevang =

Norwegian singer and choir conductor

Øystein Fevang (born December 25, 1963) is a Norwegian singer and choir conductor. He conducts the Oslo Philharmonic Choir. He studied singing and conducting at the music conservatory in Oslo and at the Norwegian Academy of Music. Fevang conducted the chamber choir Ensemble 96 from 1996–2006.

For several years he has taught conducting at the Norwegian Academy of Music and at Rud sixth form college near Oslo.

Ensemble 96 and Øystein Fevang's CD "Immortal Nystedt", published on the label 2L, is nominated for the 49th Grammy Awards in the categories Best Choral Performance and Best Surround Album. Fevang and Ensemble 96 was awarded The Norwegian Choir Association's Choral Award for 2007.

== Recordings ==
- Immortal Nystedt - 2L 2005 - Works by Knut Nystedt - Ensemble 96, Bærum Vokalensemble and Øystein Fevang
- Liknarbraut - 2L 2002 - Work by Wolfgang Plagge - Ensemble 96 and Øystein Fevang
- Old – Universal 2001 - Ketil Bjørnstad - Ensemble 96, Jai Shankar, Palle Mikkelborg, Helen Davies, Ketil Bjørnstad and Øystein Fevang
- Christmas album Det lyser i stille grender - Naxos 1998 - Ensemble 96 and Øystein Fevang
