= Jamal al-Jamal =

Palestinian diplomat

Jamal al-Jamal (جمال الجمل)

Palestinian Ambassador to the Czech Republic
- In office 11 October 2013 – 1 January 2014
- Preceded by: Mohamed Salaymeh
- Succeeded by: Khaled al-Atrash

Personal details
- Born: 1 August 1957; Sabra refugee camp, Beirut, Lebanon
- Died: 1 January 2014 (aged 56); Prague, Czech Republic
- Political party: Fatah (1975–2013)

Jamal al-Jamal (Arabic: جمال الجمل; 1 August 1957–1 January 2014) was a Palestinian diplomat. He was ambassador to the Czech Republic from 11 October 2013 until his death.

== Diplomatic career ==
Jamal al-Jamal was born in 1957, in Beirut's Sabra refugee camp. His family is originally from Jaffa in what is now Israel. He joined Fatah in 1975 and was appointed Deputy Ambassador to Bulgaria in 1979. Starting in 1984, he served as a diplomat in Prague, eventually as acting ambassador. Between 2005 and 2013, he functioned as consul general in Alexandria, Egypt. In October 2013, he was appointed Ambassador to the Czech Republic.

== Death ==
According to Czech police, al-Jamal was fatally injured in an explosion that shook his official residence on New Year's Day 2014. He died several hours after being taken to the hospital, authorities said. Czech police claim that the blast was caused by an explosive device in a safe, and that it was not a preplanned attack. Later, Czech police found illegal weapons and ammunition in the Palestinian Embassy in Prague. Czech Foreign Minister Jan Kohout later said that the incident represented "a serious violation of the Vienna Convention on Diplomatic Relations." The Mayor of Suchdol, Petr Hejl, has called for the embassy to be moved from the district.
