= Naro-Fominsk rail crash =

2014 railway incident in Russia

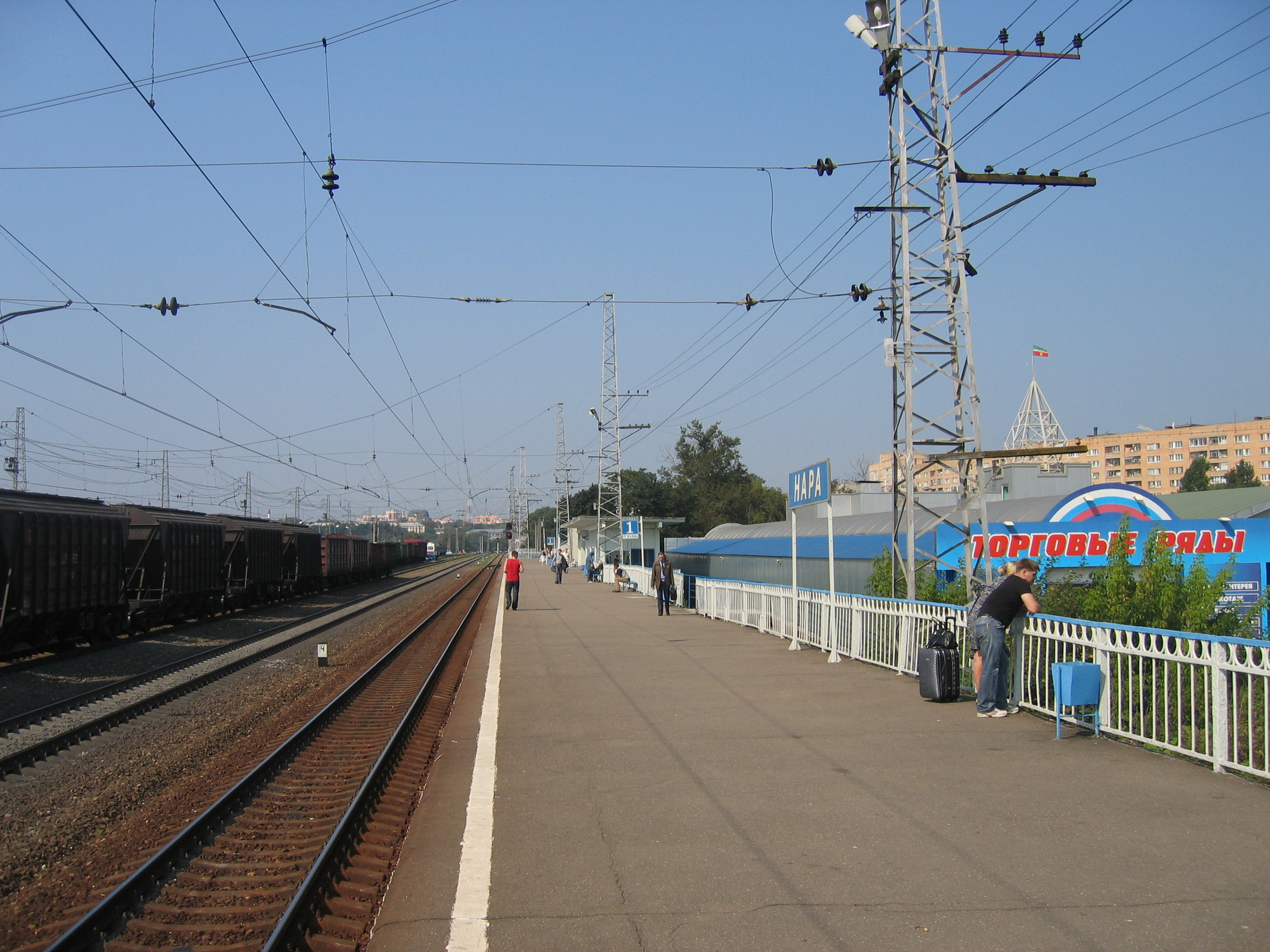
- The accident occurred near Nara station, Naro-Fominsk.

Details
- Date: 20 May 2014; 12:32 Moscow Standard Time
- Location: Between Bekasovo and Naro-Fominsk, Russia; 60 km (37 mi) south west from Moscow
- Coordinates: 55°23′03.2″N 36°46′08.2″E
- Country: Russia
- Line: Moscow – Kyiv
- Operator: Ukrainian Railways (freight); Moldovan Railways (passenger)
- Incident type: Derailment and collision
- Cause: Under investigation

Statistics
- Trains: 2
- Passengers: 394
- Deaths: 9
- Injured: 51

The Naro-Fominsk rail crash occurred on 20 May 2014 when a freight train derailed near Naro-Fominsk, Moscow Oblast, Russia. The train was run into by a passenger train. Nine people were killed and 51 were injured.

== Crash ==
At 12:32 Moscow Standard Time (08:32 UTC) on 20 May 2014, a freight train derailed between Bekasovo and Naro-Fominsk on the Moscow–Kyiv railway. The derailed wagons fouled an adjacent track. A Moscow–Chișinău passenger train collided with the derailed wagons, killing nine people and injuring 51; 29 of whom were taken to hospital. There were 394 passengers on board. The passenger train was operated by Moldovan Railways. It was travelling at 95 kilometres per hour (59 mph) before the driver made an emergency brake application, having seen the cloud of dust caused by the derailment of the freight train. The seventh and eighth carriages of the train were those most severely damaged in the accident. The side of one of the carriages was ripped open in the accident.

Victims were taken to hospitals in Moscow, Naro-Fominsk, Odintsovo and Selyatino. Two victims were flown by helicopter to a Moscow hospital.

The stretch of track which the freight train derailed on was under repair at the time of the accident. A broken rail is suspected to have been the cause of the freight train derailing; however, a broken axle on one of the wagons may also have caused the accident. The line between Aprelevka and Nara station, Naro-Fominsk was blocked by the crash, with buses replacing trains. By late evening, one line was reopened, allowing Moscow commuters to travel home by train. Passengers bound for Moscow were transported by bus.

== Investigation ==
The Russian Investigative Committee opened an investigation into the crash. A criminal investigation was also opened into the crash. Causes under investigation included a broken rail, the condition of the freight train and the driving of the freight train. Speaking in Shanghai, China, Russian President Vladimir Putin ruled out terrorism as a cause. Subsequent inquiry revealed that the end reason of the derailment was the sun kink on the seamless rail due to thermal expansion and improper maintenance. The problem with the rails was known and attempts to rectify them were made, but couldn't be completed in time before the accident, because the institutional culture discouraged the personnel from interrupting the traffic on a busy line. Additional blame was placed on the maintenance team trying to rectify this problem, which failed to notify the controllers and the train crews about track work they were conducting.
