= Greek Reporter =

Greek news website

- Formation: 2008
- Founder: Anastasios Papapostolou
- Website: greekreporter.com

Greek Reporter is a news organization covering Greeks around the world. It functions as a news agency and online portal consisting of a collection of internet news web sites for Greek people and people of Greek descent who live and work in and outside of Greece.

== History ==
Greek Reporter was founded in 2008 by Anastasios (Tasos) Papapostolou as Greek Hollywood Reporter, a news portal for the Greek community in the entertainment business. Two years later, the site expanded in order to target all Greek diaspora and changed its name to Greek Reporter.
