= Grete Pedersen =

Norwegian choral conductor and footballer

Grete Pedersen (born 1960) is a Norwegian choral conductor and former footballer.

== Career in music ==
She is on the staff of the Norwegian Academy of Music. She is noted for her work with Det Norske Solistkor which she conducted between 1990 and 2025. She has appeared as a guest conductor abroad, for example with the BBC Singers (the BBC's professional chamber choir), and as the artistic director and principal conductor of the Carmel Bach Festival.

She often features Scandinavian repertoire, but her recordings include a critically acclaimed version of the Bach motets.

In 2025, after 35 years, Pedersen ends her position as artistic director at Det Norske Solistkor. From early 2026, she will instead serve as professor at the Institute of Sacred Music at Yale University and principal conductor of Yale Schola Cantorum.

== Awards ==
- She is a recipient of the Norwegian Music Critics Award.
- Her recording of the Bach motets on BIS received a Diapason d'Or in 2018.
