= Ensemble 96 =

Norwegian chamber choir

Ensemble 96 is a Norwegian chamber choir located in Oslo. The choir works mainly with contemporary music and is partly funded by government grants. It has released several CDs, and given concerts and participated in national and international choral competitions. Ensemble 96 has just under 30 members.

Ensemble 96 was founded in 1996, and had its beginnings in the (now defunct) Oslo Philharmonic Chamber Choir.

The current conductor is Nina T. Karlsen. The founding conductor was Øystein Fevang.

Ensemble 96's CD "Immortal Nystedt", published on the label 2L, was nominated for the 49th Grammy Awards in the categories Best Choral Performance and Best Surround Album. The choir was awarded The Norwegian Choir Association's Choral Award for 2007.

== First productions and commissioned works ==
- Antonio Bibalo: Psalm 8, November 2006
- Jon Balke: Palabras sueltas, Kongsberg Jazz Festival 2006
- Kjell Mørk Karlsen: O magnum mysterium, 2005
- Synne Skouen: En spøk (In Jest), 2005
- Knut Nystedt: Jesu Sieben Worte, 2003
- Stephen Frost: Parapraxis, in cooperation with Norwegian bassoonist Sigyn Birkeland, 2003
- Wolfgang Plagge: Salve Crux, 2002
- Wolfgang Plagge: Psalm 84, 2001
- Trond Lindheim: wedding cantata Hjelp, de gifter seg! (Oh my, they are getting married!) on the Norwegian national broadcasting company (NRK TV) during the wedding of Crown Prince Haakon and Miss Mette-Marit Tjessem Høiby in 2001
- Wolfgang Plagge: Liknarbraut, 2000
- Ketil Bjørnstad: Old, in cooperation with Jai Shankar, Palle Mikkelborg, Helen Davies and Ketil Bjørnstad, Vestfold International Festival 2000

== Recordings ==
- "Kind" - 2L 2010 - Works by Marcus Paus, amongst others
- Immortal Nystedt - 2L 2005 - Works by Knut Nystedt
- Liknarbraut - 2L 2002 - Work by Wolfgang Plagge
- Old – Universal 2001 - Ketil Bjørnstad
- Christmas album Det lyser i stille grender - Naxos 1998
