= Det Norske Solistkor =

Norwegian choir

- Choir
- Origin: Oslo, Norway
- Founded: 1950
- Founder: Knut Nystedt
- Genre: Professional mixed choir
- Artistic Director: Yuval Weinberg (expected 2026)
- Website: solistkoret.no/en/

Det Norske Solistkor (The Norwegian soloists' choir) is a professional choral ensemble founded in Oslo in 1950 by the composer Knut Nystedt in collaboration with Kåre Siem. It is formed of today 26 singers, varied in performance depending on the performed works.

The ensemble is the only professional choir in Norway besides the chorus of the Oslo Opera. They have toured to France, Germany, the U.S., Korea, China and Israel.

Knut Nystedt conducted the group until 1990, when he was succeeded by Grete Pedersen. Pedersen led the choir until 2025, when it was announced that its sometime guest conductor Yuval Weinberg would take over, beginning autumn 2026.

== Discography ==
The ensemble has made recordings. A recording of Bach's motets on BIS was awarded the Diapason d'Or in 2018.
