= Knut Nystedt =

Norwegian composer (1915–2014)

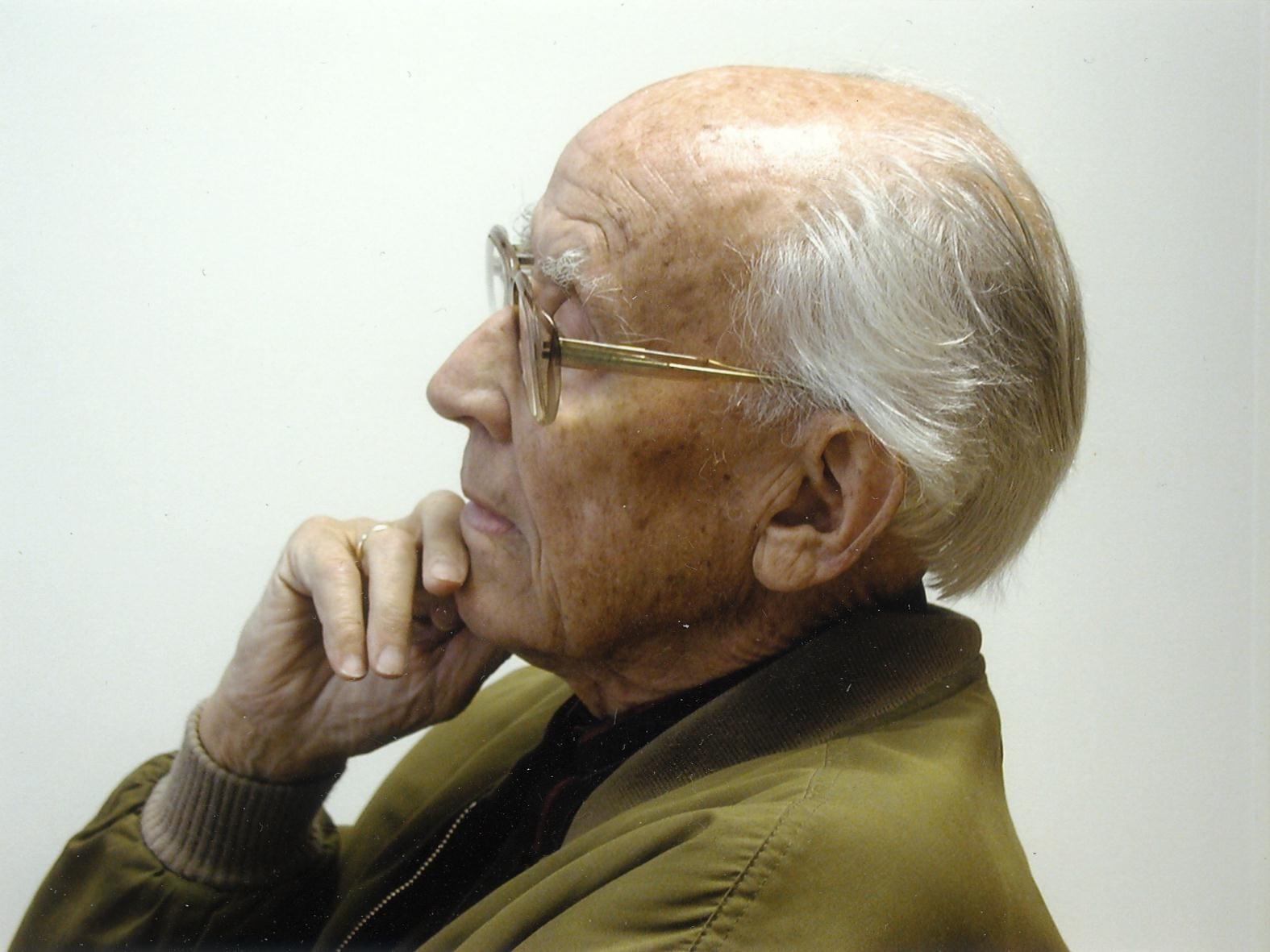
- Nystedt in 2007
- Born: 3 September 1915; Kristiania, Norway
- Died: 8 December 2014 (aged 99); Oslo, Norway
- Occupations: composer; organist
- Website: www.knutnystedt.com

Knut Nystedt (3 September 1915 – 8 December 2014) was a Norwegian orchestral and choral composer.

== Early life ==
Nystedt was born in Kristiania (now Oslo), Norway, and grew up in a Christian home where hymns and classical music were an important part of everyday life. His major compositions for choir and vocal soloists are mainly based on texts from the Bible or sacred themes. Old church music, especially Palestrina and Gregorian chants, have had a major influence on his compositions.

== Career ==
Nystedt studied with Aaron Copland among others. He was the organist in the Torshov Church in Oslo from 1946 to 1982 and taught choir conducting at the University of Oslo from 1964 to 1985.

Nystedt founded and conducted the Norwegian Soloists' Choir from 1950 to 1990. He also founded and conducted the Schola Cantorum from 1964 to 1985. The choir Ensemble 96 published "Immortal Nystedt" in 2005. This CD was nominated in two categories in the 2007 Grammy Awards and was the first Norwegian CD so nominated. It was also the first CD with a Norwegian composer nominated for a Grammy. On the occasion of his 90th birthday in 2005, there were several concerts around the world held in his honour.

Key Nystedt works include the symphony Apocalypsis Joannis for soloists, choir and orchestra, op. 155 (1998), commissioned by the Oslo Philharmonic; Ode til mennesket, op. 159 (2000), featuring texts by Sophocles, Hippocrates and Plato; The Word Became Flesh, op. 162 (2001), commissioned by the Augsburg College Choir; and Reach Out For Peace for soprano, choir and orchestra, op. 164 A (2001), commissioned by the Ceciliaforeningen.

In 1966, the King of Norway made Nystedt a Knight of the Order of St. Olav in recognition of his contributions to Norwegian music, and in 2002 the King made him a Commander of St. Olav. He received the Spellemann Award in 1978 for his album Contemporary Music From Norway and received the music prize of the Arts Council Norway in 1980. In 1965, De Profundis was bestowed with the Work of the Year award of the Norwegian Society of Composers. Nystedt was awarded an honorary professorship ('Professor Honorario') by Mendoza University Argentina in 1991. In 2002 he received the Choir Prize of the Year from the Norwegian Choir Association and in 2005 the Artists' Prize by the City of Oslo.

Most of his compositions were published by Norsk Musikkforlag. His compositions also appear on several CDs in Norway and several other countries.

== Death ==
Nystedt died in his sleep in Oslo on 8 December 2014 at the age of 99.

== Works ==
=== Choral works ===
- Landstad-kantate, op. 27, cantata for mezzo-soprano, baritone, SATB choir and organ
- A hymn of human rights, op. 95, for mixed choir, organ and percussion
- Missa brevis, op. 102 for mixed choir a cappella
- Adoro te, op. 107, for mixed choir (SSAATTBB) a cappella
- Immortal Bach, 1988
- A song as in the night, op. 149, for soloists, choir, flute, strings and percussion
- Apocalypsis Joannis, op. 155, symphony for soloists, choir and orchestra
- All the Ways of a Man for mixed choir (SATB) a cappella
- Astri, mi Astri, Norwegian folk songs for mixed choir
- Christmas Carols, for mixed choir and watches
- Cry Out and Shout, for mixed choir SSATTB (Festival) a cappella
- But the Path of the Just for mixed choir
- "O Crux" for choir a cappella (SSSAATTBB)
- ”Praise to God” for choir a cappella
- Prayers of Kierkegaard, op. 157, for mixed choir (SATB) a cappella (1999)

=== Concertante ===
- Concerto Arctandriae, op. 128 for strings
- Concerto for Horn and Orchestra, op. 114
- Concerto Grosso, op. 17b for three trumpets and organ/piano
- Concerto Sacro, op. 137 for violin and organ

=== Orchestra works ===
- Festival Overture, op. 25

=== Organ solo ===
- Exultate, op. 74
- Le verbe eternel, op. 133
- Prélude Héroïque, op. 123
- Resurrexit, op.68
- Suite d'orgue, op. 84
- Toccata, op. 9
- Tu es Petrus
- Two Organ Pieces (from Apocalypsis Joannis, op. 155)
- Amazing Grace
- Beati
- Variasjoner over folketonen "Med Jesus vil eg fara", op. 4
- Veni Creator Spiritus Partita, op. 75

== Discography ==
- Contemporary Music From Norway (1967)
- Contemporary Music From Norway (1968)
- The Hindar String Quartet* – String Quartet No. 1 Op. 5 / String Quartet No. 4 Op. 56 (1968)
- Contemporary Music From Norway (1971)
- Contemporary Music From Norway (1978)
- The Norwegian Soloists' Choir, Knut Nystedt – Toner Julenatt (1980)
- Oslo Philharmonic, Knut Nystedt (1980)
- Harald Herresthal, Knut Nystedt Suite D'Orgue Op. 84 (1984)
- Gunnar Sønstevold, Katja Medbøe, The Norwegian Soloist's Choir, Sætre Girl's Choir, The Norwegian Wind Quintet, Sandvika Big Band, Bærum Symphony Orchestra, Knut Nystedt – Litani I Atlanta (1985)
- The Norwegian Soloists' Choir, A Hymn Of Human Rights (1986)
- Bergen Philharmonic Orchestra, Knut Nystedt – The Burnt Sacrifice Op. 36 – O. Crux Op. 79 – Shells Op. 70 A – Sinfonia Del Mare Op. 97 – De Profundis Op. 54 – Resurrexit Op. 68 – Suoni Op. 62 (1988)
- Oslo Philharmonic, The Norwegian Soloists' Choir, Knut Nystedt – Lucis creator optime, Opus 58 / Pia Memoria, Opus 65 / Rhapsody In Green, Opus 82 / 19. Motets (1992)
- Minsk Chamber Orchestra, Knut Nystedt Symphony For Strings, Opus 26 / Concertino For Clarinet, English Horn And Strings, Opus 29 / Concerto Grosso For Three Trumpets And Strings Opus 17 (1993)
- Oslo String Quartet, Knut Nystedt – String Quartets (1995)
- Knut Nystedt (1996)
- Brass Partout, Playground for Angels (2000)
- Oslo Philharmonic, Apocalypsis Joannis (2003)
- Ensemble 96, Immortal Nystedt (2005)
- Exultate Singers, All Shall Be Well (2012)
