= Lorentzen =

Lorentzen is a common patronymic surname in Denmark and Norway, as well as the name of a few places.

== People ==
- Lorentzen family, a family of shipping magnates related to the Norwegian royal family. Members include:
  - Øivind Lorentzen (1882–1980), shipping magnate, father of Erling Lorentzen
  - Henriette Bie Lorentzen (1911–2001), Norwegian journalist, humanist, peace activist, feminist
  - Erling Lorentzen (1923–2012), Norwegian shipowner and industrialist, married Princess Ragnhild
  - Princess Ragnhild, Mrs. Lorentzen (1930–2012), Norwegian princess, wife of Erling Lorentzen

Other notable people with the surname include:

- Christian August Lorentzen (1749–1828), Danish painter
- Mogens Lorentzen (1892–1953), Danish writer, painter and illustrator
- Frithjof Lorentzen (1896–1965), Norwegian fencer
- Gustav Lorentzen (scientist) (1915–1995), Norwegian thermodynamic scientist
- Sigurd Lorentzen (1916–1979), Norwegian judge and civil servant
- Annemarie Lorentzen (1921–2008), Norwegian politician
- Bent Lorentzen (1935–2018), Danish composer
- Gustav Lorentzen (1947–2010), Norwegian singer-songwriter
- Ida Lorentzen (born 1951), American–Norwegian artist
- Indra Lorentzen (born 1956), Norwegian dancer and choreographer
- Reidar Lorentzen (born 1956), Norwegian javelin thrower
- Jørgen Lorentzen (born 1956), Norwegian literary scholar and film producer
- Morten Lorentzen (born 1960), Danish comedian, actor and film director
- Kristian Pihl Lorentzen (born 1961), Danish politician and author
- Rune Lorentsen (born 1961), Norwegian wheelchair curler
- Anne Lorentzen (1963–2013), Norwegian singer and media researcher
- Jakob Lorentzen (born 1968), Danish organist
- Ingrid Lorentzen (born 1972), Norwegian ballet dancer
- Karina Lorentzen (born 1973), Danish politician
- Peter Lorentzen (born 1983), Norwegian ice hockey player
- Kasper Lorentzen (born 1985), Danish footballer
- Lisa Lorentzen (fl. from 1986), Norwegian mathematician
- Håvard Holmefjord Lorentzen (born 1992), Norwegian speed skater
- Håkon Lorentzen (born 1997), Norwegian footballer
- Christine Lorentzen (fl. from 2006), also known as Lore, Danish singer-songwriter

== Places ==
- Lorentzen, Bas-Rhin, a commune in the Bas-Rhin department in Grand Est, France
  - Château de Lorentzen, a castle in the commune
- Lorentzen Peak, in Queen Maud Land, Antarctica
