= Kritikerprisen =

Kritikerprisen may refer to:

- Norwegian Critics Prize for Literature
- Norwegian Theatre Critics Award
- Norwegian Music Critics Award
- Norwegian Dance Critics Award
- Danish Critics Prize for Literature
