= Aase Bye =

Norwegian actress (1904–1991)

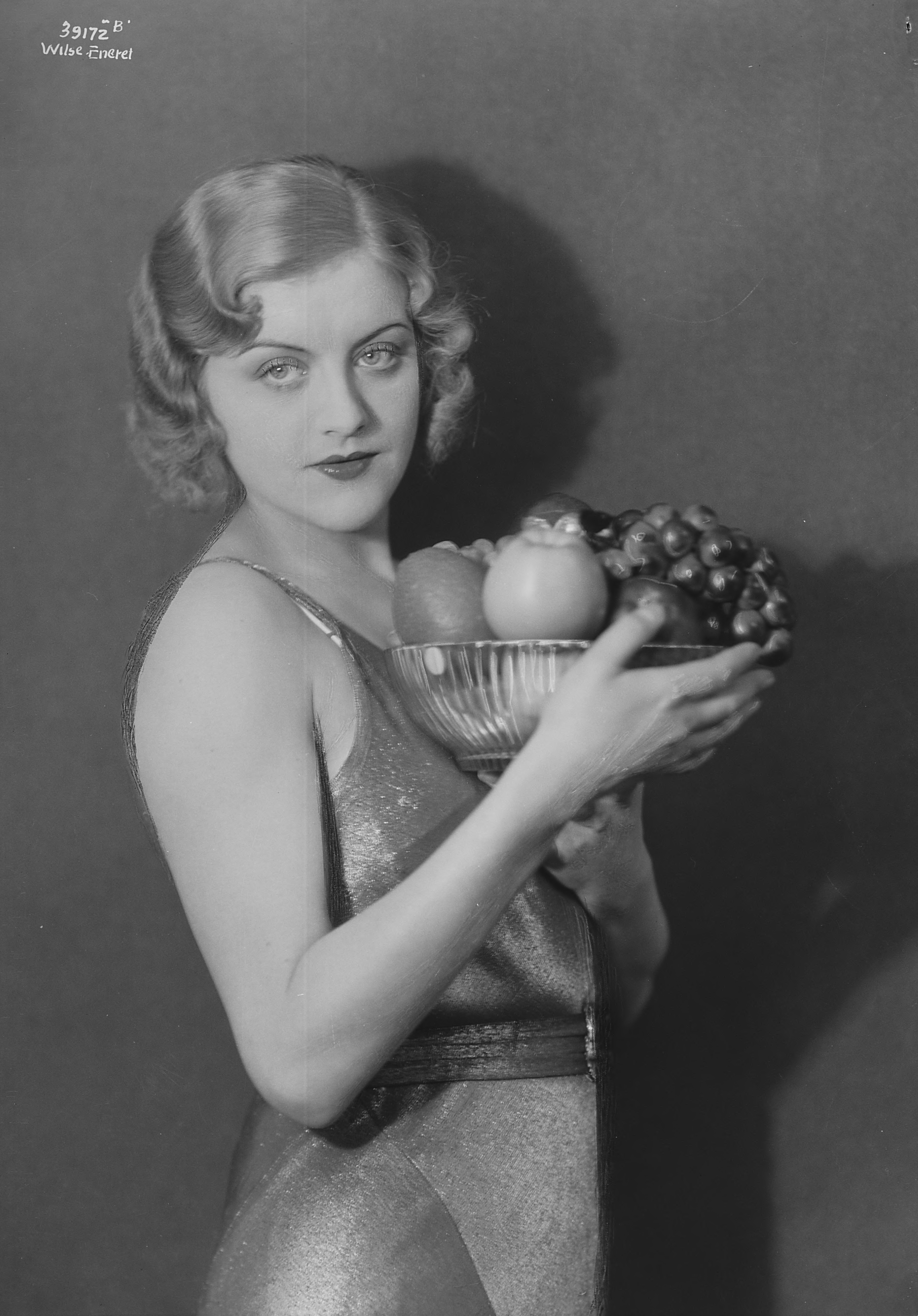
- Bye in 1932.
- Born: Aase Synnøve Bye; 4 June 1904; Kristiania (now Oslo), Norway
- Died: 10 July 1991 (aged 87); Oslo, Norway
- Spouses: Carl Christian Christensen (1927–1929); Jan Kurt Dedichen (1929–1935); Trygve Jacob Broch Hoff (1948–1982)

Aase Synnøve Bye (4 June 1904 – 10 July 1991) was a Norwegian actress, known from stage, film and television. in her honor, the Aase Byes pris is awarded in support of deserving artists.

== Personal life ==
She was born in Kristiania (now Oslo), Norway as a daughter of the merchant Anders Bye (1874–1918) and Astrid Hansen (1879–1920). She was married three times. The first marriage, to the physician Carl Christian Christensen (1882–1949), only lasted from August 1927 to 1929. In 1929 she married the shipbroker Jan Kurt Dedichen (1897–1935). Dedichen was a son of the chemist Georg Dedichen and grandson of Edvard Brandes, but died in September 1935. In 1948 she married the economist, author, and editor-in-chief Trygve Jacob Broch Hoff (1895–1982).

== Career ==
Bye made her stage debut at the Nationaltheatret in Oslo during 1923, and was hailed as a talent by Bjørn Bjørnson. Except for short interruptions because of illness or other engagements, she remained faithful to the Nationaltheatret for over 50 years retiring from the state in 1974. Her first role was Solveig in Ibsen's Peer Gynt. The following year she portrayed Sonja in the premier of Reisen til Julestjernen by playwright Sverre Brandt (1880–1962). She also appeared in silent films, sound films and on television.

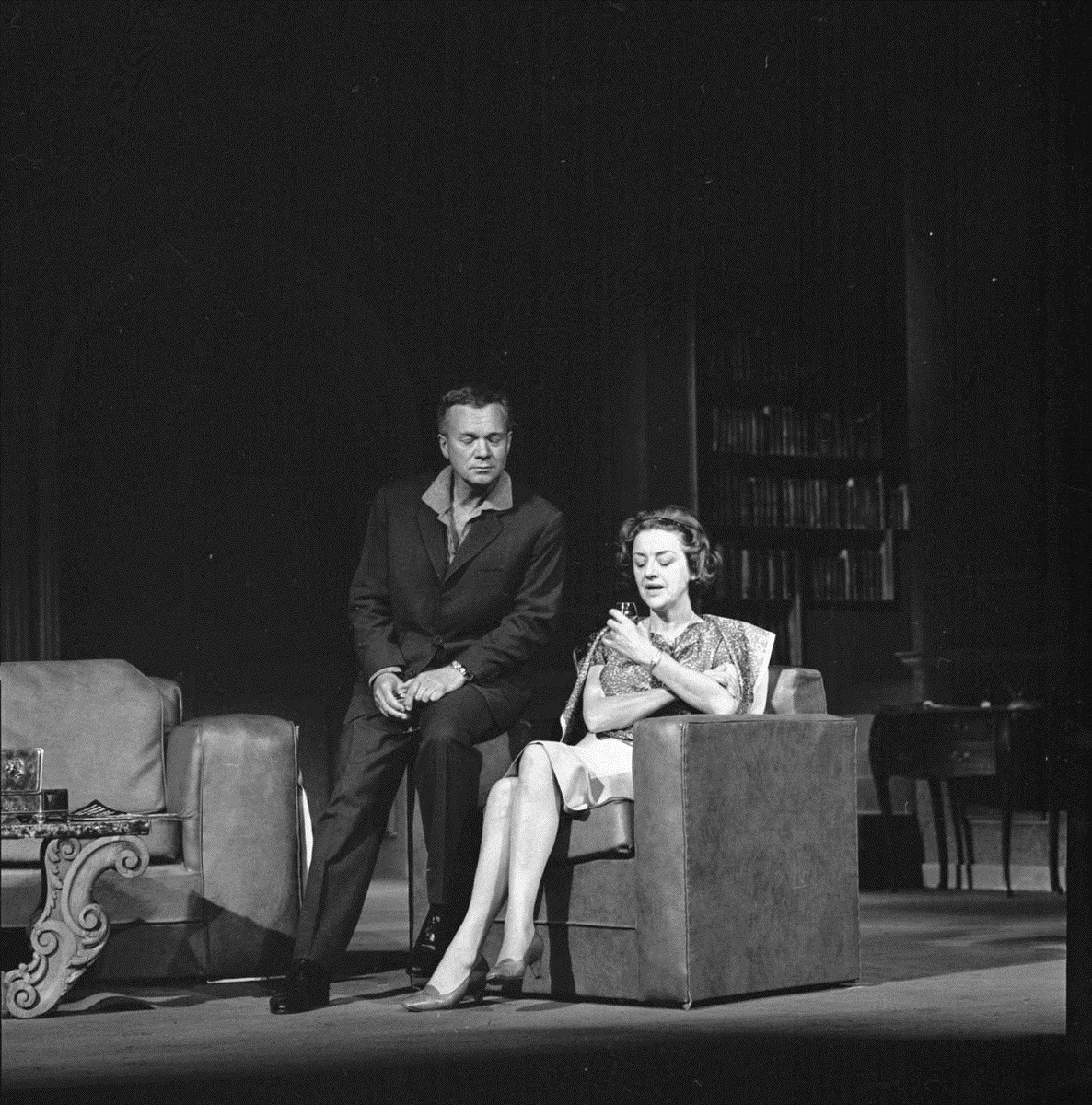
Bye (right) with actor Jørn Ording (left) at the National Theatre in 1967

In 1949, she was awarded the Norwegian Theatre Critics Award (Teaterkritikerprisen) for her interpretation of Blanche Dubois in the Norwegian production of the Tennessee Williams play A Streetcar Named Desire. The play had been translated by Peter Magnus (1915-2001) and performed at Nationaltheatre under the direction of Gerda Ring (1891–1999) and Ella Hval (1904–1994).

== Awards and legacy ==
Bye was decorated as a Commander of the Royal Norwegian Order of St. Olav in 1974, and also held the HM The King's Medal of Merit in gold as well as foreign orders of knighthood.

== Aase Byes pris ==
Aase Bye's testament established an endowment; Aase Byes Legat til Støtte for Fortjente Kunstnere. The Aase Byes pris has been awarded annually since 1993 in support of deserving artists. Recipients have included:

- Stein Grieg Halvorsen (1993)
- Liv Dommersnes (1995)
- Solveig Kringlebotn (1995)
- Knut Skram (1997)
- Kjersti Holmen (1999)
- Lise Fjeldstad (2001)
- Rut Tellefsen (2001)
- Kim Haugen (2003)
- Anne Marit Jacobsen (2003)
- Bjarte Hjelmeland (2004)
- Henny Moan (2006)
- Frøydis Armand (2007)
- Kjersti Alveberg (2008)
- Espen Giljane (2008)
- Kari Simonsen (2009)
- Sverre Anker Ousdal (2010)
- Kjell Askildsen (2011)
- Kjetil Bang-Hansen (2012)
- Svein Tindberg (2012)
- Hildegunn Eggen (2014)
- Bjarte Hjelmeland (2016)

== Other sources ==
- Ruth Krefting (1963) Skuespillerinnen Aase Bye (Oslo, Gyldendal)
