= Norwegian Music Critics Award =

Norwegian music award

The Norwegian Music Critics Award (Den norske Musikkritikerprisen or Kritikerprisen) is awarded by the Norwegian Critics' Association (Norsk Kritikerlag) and has been awarded every year since 1947. For other Norwegian Critics Awards, see the Norwegian Literature Critics Award, which has been awarded every year since 1950, the Norwegian Theatre Critics Award, which has been awarded every year since 1939 (except 1940–45), and the Norwegian Dance Critics Award, which has been awarded every year since 1977.

== Annual Norwegian Music Critics Award Winners ==
- 1947/48 – Eva Gustavson
- 1948/49 – Eva Prytz
- 1949/50 – Randi Helseth
- 1950/51 – Ny norsk ballett (for dance art)
- 1951/52 – Anne Brown
- 1952/53 – not awarded
- 1953/54 – Arne Hendriksen
- 1954/55 – Waldemar Johnsen
- 1955/56 – Ørnulf Gulbransen
- 1956/57 – Robert Levin
- 1957/58 – Det norske solistkor
- 1958/59 – Alf Andersen
- 1959/60 – Ingrid Bjoner
- 1960/61 – Ragnar Ulfung
- 1961/62 – Henny Mürer (for dance art)
- 1962/63 – not awarded
- 1963/64 – Kari Frisell
- 1964/65 – Kjell Bækkelund (did not want to receive the award)
- 1965/66 – Arvid Fladmoe
- 1966/67 – Bjarne Larsen
- 1967/68 – Eva Knardahl
- 1968/69 – Arve Tellefsen
- 1969/70 – Robert Riefling
- 1970/71 – Birgitte Grimstad
- 1971/72 – Edith Thallaug
- 1972/73 – Finn Ludt
- 1973/74 – Jens Harald Bratlie
- 1974/75 – Einar Steen Nøkleberg
- 1975/76 – Vessa Hansen
- 1976/77 – Den Norske Blåsekvintett
- 1977/78 – Else Dehli
- 1978/79 – Okko Kamu
- 1979/80 – Terje Tønnesen
- 1980/81 – Aage Kvalbein
- 1981/82 – Knut Skram
- 1982/83 – Mariss Jansons
- 1983/84 – Truls Otterbech Mørk
- 1984/85 – Oslo Trio
- 1985/86 – Anne Gjevang
- 1986/87 – Lars Anders Tomter
- 1987/88 – Leif Ove Andsnes
- 1988/89 – Håkon Austbø
- 1989/90 – Solveig Kringlebotn
- 1990/91 – Terje Kvam
- 1991/92 – Elisabeth Norberg-Schulz
- 1992/93 – Ole Kristian Ruud
- 1993/94 – Grieg Trio
- 1994/95 – Arild Helleland
- 1995/96 – Vertavokvartetten
- 1996/97 – Stein Winge
- 1997/98 – Randi Stene
- 1998/99 – Christian Eggen
- 1999/00 – Oslo Strykekvartett
- 2000/01 – Halgeir Schiager
- 2001/02 – Peter Herresthal
- 2002/03 – Toril Carlsen
- 2003/04 – Rolf Lislevand
- 2004/05 – Henning Kraggerud
- 2005/06 – Rolf Gupta
- 2006/07 – Terje Stensvold
- 2007/08 – Stefan Herheim
- 2008/09 – not awarded
- 2009/10 – Grete Pedersen
- 2010/11 – Truls Mørk and Håvard Gimse
