= Schønning =

Schønning is a surname. Notable people with the surname include:

- Klaus Schønning (born 1954), Danish musician
- Soffi Schønning (1895–1994), Norwegian operatic soprano
