= Telenor Culture Award =

Telenor Culture Prize, titled 'Boundless Communication', is given annually to performing artists or organizations that have made an extraordinary contribution within culture in Scandinavia, but who also are established internationally.

The prize was awarded for the first time in 1995 and since then has recognized artists and artistic organizations every year representing multiple disciplines. The prize is awarded to individuals, groups or institutions that have made a significant contribution to culture, across geographical, social and cultural borders. The prize is awarded for innovative performance or communication-related activities at the highest level, within or across artistic forms of expression

== Telenor Culture Prize jury ==
- Martin Revheim, House Manager, Sparebankstiftelsen DNB, Leader of the Jury
- Lars Saabye Christensen, author
- Ingrid Lorentzen, Artistic Director of the National Ballet
- Alexandra Archetti Stølen, Festival Manager at Oslo World
- Henrik Mestad, actor
- Randi Winnem Due, Telenor Group

== Recipients ==
- 1995 – Svein Tindberg, actor
- 1996 – Wenche Øyen, artist
- 1997 – Kjersti Alveberg, choreographer
- 1998 – Kari Bremnes, singer, composer and lyricist
- 1999 – Torun Lian, writer and film director
- 2000 – Juni Dahr, actress
- 2001 – Ingvar Ambjørnsen, writer
- 2002 – none, as explained above
- 2003 – The World Theatre, Oslo performance group
- 2004 – Ingrid Lorentzen, ballet dancer
- 2005 – Anne Marit Jacobsen, actress
- 2006 – International Child Art Museum
- 2007 – Marilyn Mazur, percussionist and composer
- 2008 – Jonas Bendiksen, photographer
- 2009 – Liv Ullmann, actress and film director
- 2010 – Olafur Eliasson, artist
- 2011 – Norwegian Radio Orchestra
- 2012 – Timbuktu, songwriter and rapper, the first Swedish recipient
- 2013 – Hisham Zaman, filmmaker
- 2014 – Stian Carstensen, musician
- 2015 – Jo Strømgren, dancer, choreographer, theatre and film director
- 2016 – Deeyah Khan, filmmaker
- 2017 – Grete Pedersen, choral conductor
- 2018 – Vanessa Baird, visual artist
- 2019 – Kim Hiorthøy, electronic musician, graphic designer, illustrator, filmmaker and writer
- 2020 – Bugge Wesseltoft, jazz musician
- 2021 – Marvin Halleraker, cartoonist
- 2022 – Girl in Red, artist
- 2023 – Elle Sofe Sara, choreographer and director
- 2024 – Henriette Steenstrup, actress, comedian and scriptwriter
- 2025 – Arne Lygre, novelist and playwright
