= Norwegian Dance Critics Award =

Norwegian dance award

The Norwegian Dance Critics Award (Den norske Dansekritikerprisen or Kritikerprisen) is awarded by the Norwegian Critics' Association (Norsk Kritikerlag) and has been awarded every year since 1977. For other Norwegian Critics Awards, see the Norwegian Literature Critics Award, which has been awarded every year since 1950, the Norwegian Theatre Critics Award, which has been awarded every year since 1939 (except 1940-45), and the Norwegian Music Critics Award, which has been awarded every year since 1947.

== Annual Norwegian Dance Critics Award Winners ==
- 1976/77 – Marte Sæther
- 1977/78 – Ellen Kjellberg
- 1978/79 – Sissel Westnes
- 1979/80 – Fredrik Rütter
- 1980/81 – Indra Lorentzen
- 1981/82 – Ketil Gudim
- 1982/83 – Toni Herlofson
- 1983/84 – Sølvi Edvardsen
- 1984/85 – Kjersti Alveberg
- 1985/86 – Gro Rakeng
- 1986/87 – Cathrine Smith
- 1987/88 – Brian Toney
- 1988/89 – Lise Eger
- 1989/90 – Judith Rowan Kongsgaard
- 1990/91 – not awarded
- 1991/92 – Jane Hveding
- 1992/93 – Marius Kjos and Karsten Solli
- 1993/94 – Nuri Ribera
- 1994/95 – Ingun Bjørnsgaard
- 1995/96 – Arlene Wilkes
- 1996/97 – Line Alsaker
- 1997/98 – Jo Strømgren
- 1998/99 – Oslo Danse Ensemble by Merete Lingjærde
- 1999/00 – Richard Suttie
- 2000/01 – Ingrid Lorentzen
- 2001/02 – Christine Thomassen
- 2002/03 – Henriette Slorer
- 2003/04 – Therese Skauge
- 2004/05 – Maiko Nishino for Odile/Odette
- 2005/06 – Camilla Spidsøe
- 2006/07 – not awarded
- 2007/08 – Ina Christel Johannessen
- 2008/09 – Odd Johan Fritzøe
- 2009/10 – Ingun Bjørnsgaard
- 2010/11 – Kristian Ruutu
- 2011/12 – Eugenie Skilnand

== See also ==
- About Dance Information Norway And Dance in Norway on Dance Information Norway
