= Jan Valentin Sæther =

Norwegian figurative painter, sculptor and gnostic priest

Jan Valentin Sæther (18 March 1944 – 11 January 2018) was a Norwegian figurative painter, sculptor and gnostic priest. He was professor of figurative painting at the National Academy of the Arts in Oslo between 1996 and 2002.

Sæther received his education from the Norwegian National Academy of Craft and Art Industry (1963–65) and the Norwegian National Academy of Fine Arts, painting under the direction of professor Reidar Aulie (1965–66) and sculpture under professor Per Palle Storm (1968–71). He has presented numerous exhibitions, mainly in Norway and California.

Sæther debuted in the prestigious Kunstnerforbundet in 1972, but prior to that he had participated in group the exhibitions "Spring Exhibition", Kunstnernes Hus 1968, "Figurative painting from the 1960s", Oslo Kunstforening (Oslo Arts Society) 1970 and "Romantik, realisme", Oslo Kunstforening 1971. During this period he went by the name Jan Isak Sæther.

In 1973 he moved to Los Angeles, California. In addition to his work as an artist he ran several art schools during his 22 years there. Sæther moved back to Oslo in 1995. Between 1995 and 1996 he worked as amanuensis in charge of the models institute at the Oslo National Academy of the Arts. In 1996 he was contracted as professor of figurative painting there following a contentious and much publicized hiring process where the only competition that was to be considered qualified was his youth friend Odd Nerdrum. Following the hiring of Sæther in the professorship connected to figurative painting and sculptor Istvan Lisztes in the professorship connected to figurative sculpture, the emotions calmed down.

== Gnostic congregation ==
Sæther became an ordained reverend of the gnostic church in December 1988 by the regional bishop Stephan A. Hoeller of Ecclesia Gnostica in California. He has led a Norwegian congregation during later years.
