= Kjersti Alveberg =

Norwegian choreographer and dancer (1948–2021)

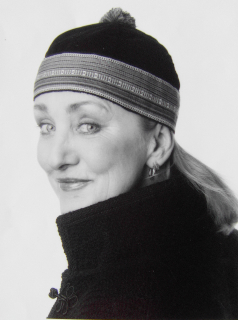
- Alveberg in 2009
- Born: 26 July 1948; Oslo, Norway
- Died: 19 October 2021 (aged 73)
- Education: Norwegian National Academy of Ballet
- Occupations: Choreographer, dancer, film director, artistic director
- Years active: 1975–2021
- Website: www.alveberg.com

Kjersti Alveberg (26 July 1948 – 19 October 2021) was a Norwegian choreographer and dancer. Over the last 30 years of her career she created ballets for stage and television and won prestigious awards for her work.

== Early life ==
Kjersti Alveberg was the older of two sisters, Siri and Eli. Her parents were Per Alveberg (1921–2009), a pioneer of rehabilitation/ social worker and Kari Alveberg (1926), a specialized teacher/children with learning disabilities.

Alveberg began to dance at the age of four, but it not until she was 19 that she took the step of starting her dance studies at Norwegian National Academy of Ballet in Oslo, working at the same time at Chat Noir as a dancer. Aiming at sociology she went on to study dance in New York City, Amsterdam, London and Paris before attending the Nansen Academy. For several years she was a freelance dancer at the Oslo theatres, in fringe groups and in television. For 5 years she was a dancer, actor and singer at Det Norske Teatret doing musicals and plays, also working in TV and in fringe dance companies. Her choreographic debut came in 1975, with "Tomorrow?" at The Norwegian Opera's Ballet Workshop.

== Career ==
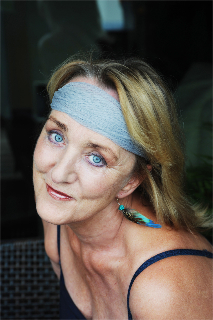
Alveberg 2009.

In 1984 Alveberg won international acclaim, when her TV ballet "Beyond Reach" achieved 3rd prize in Prix Italia. The same year the Norwegian dance and theatre critics chose her ballet as that year's best stage production. The "Ashes, Mist, Windblown Dust", inspired by Ibsen's Peer Gynt, was awarded the jury's Special Prize in Prix Italia 1986 plus other national and international TV awards. TV producer Jannike Falk certainly has contributed to the success of Kjersti Alveberg's many dance films, like "Who is the one?"/"Bønn" (1996) to new music by Jan Garbarek and poems by Rumi. Alveberg has also cooperated with producer Stein Roger Bull. "Dance Macabre" (1995) is one of several NRK ballets made for The Eurovision Summer Concert at Holmenkollen. Kjersti Alveberg has choreographed several ballets for New Carte Blanche: "Amber" and "Echo", both televised in NRK. When establishing stately support for Carte Blanche, (Norway's modern dance company), Alveberg was an artistic front figure. In 1990 her full length ballet: "Volven", (Scandinavian saga of creation), premiered at The Norwegian National Ballet with music by Synne Skouen, later touring Denmark, Aalborg and The Royal Danish Opera. In 2000 The Norwegian National Ballet presented "Volven" for the third time. "Volven", (the Norse goddess of destiny) was first danced in 1989 by Indra Lorentzen, in 1994 by Nina Bjørsvik and in 2000 by Ingrid Lorentzen. "Volven" has been said to be the most grandiose and poetic epos created by a Norwegian choreographer so far.

In 1991, Alveberg won the prestigious competition of ideas for the Norwegian Olympic Ceremonies. The Lillehammer Opening Ceremony in 1994 was built on her concept of ideas. She was the artistic leader for the Olympic Ceremonies for one year, with choreographer Sølvi Edvardsen as her co-director. In 1992, she created Norway's presentation at the Winter Olympics in Albertville, France.

"Babies of Babel" was created for The Norwegian National Ballet in 1998. "Journey On Dreamt Ocean" in 2001 was inspired by the universe of painter Terje Ytjhall.

In 2005, Alveberg released her book Visions. Eye On Dance. Press publishing house. It details her declaration of love for dance as an art form. That same year, she was appointed artistic director for the opening ceremony of The Norwegian National Library.

In 2007, she created the cross-over performance:"@lice", commissioned by Concerts Norway and The Norwegian national touring theatre. The next year, she directed and edited "@lice" for TV with Mats Claesson/Sarah Rosenbaum. Exposed in NRK2 2009.

In 2009, Alveberg was appointed head of the jury for Telenor's International Culture prize.

Alveberg's ballets have always been thematically oriented - many were inspired by art, philosophy, poetry and music. Norwegian TV has created two portrait programs about her: "Metropolis" (1990) and "Dance Me!" (2003). Produced by Morten Tomte and Jannike Falk.

== Personal life and death ==
Alveberg was married to journalist Anders Hoff in Oslo from 1981 to 1989. From 1990 to 2000 she lived with chiropractor Knut Assjer in Asker. Alveberg has one son, Noah Alveberg.

Alveberg died on 19 October 2021 at the age of 73.

== Productions ==
Year	Title	Notes	Production Company
2010	Nano	Ballet. Repertory	Oslo National Academy of the Arts
2009	Transcendance	Ballet duet	Oslo National Academy of the Arts
2008	@lice	Crossover performance. Filmed and telecasted in 2009 by NRK2	Co-production, Riksteatret/Concerts Norway
2006	Cubaret	Ballet	Oslo Dance Ensemble
2005	Hush!	Artistic director of the Opening Ceremony	National Library of Norway
2004	Mirror ("Lille Speil")	Guest performance Nice/France.	
2004	It's about time ("Nett No!")	Guest performanceHarare/Zimbabwe	Oslo National Academy of the Arts
2003	Dance Me ("Dans meg")	TV portrait of Alveberg	Norwegian Broadcasting Corporation
2003	Dancing Cuba!	Filmed and directed, TV Documentary	Nordisk Films, TV2
2002	It's about time ("Nett No!")	A full evening production at Det Norske Teatret	Norwegian Broadcasting Corporation
2001	Mirror (Lille Speil)	Full evening production	Det Norske Teatret
2001	Space and man ("Rommet og mennesket")	As Dancer/Choreographer	Norwegian Broadcasting Corporation
2001	Journey on dreamt ocean ("Reise på drømt hav")		Norwegian National Opera and Ballet
2000	Mini Macho		Norwegian National Academy of Ballet
2000	Volven ("Volven")	Full evening ballet, new version, third cast.	Norwegian National Opera and Ballet
1999	Zap Zombie ("Skjeve Blikk")	New version, Norway tour, telecasted on NRK	Oslo Dance Ensemble
1999	Fragile Moments ("Skjøre Sekunder")	Solo Line Alsaker (100 years' anniversary)	National Theatre, Oslo, Norwegian Broadcasting Corporation
1999	Tikk Takk 1000	New years' gala 2000	Norwegian National Opera and Ballet, Norwegian National Academy of Ballet
1998	Babies of Babel ("Babels Barn")		Norwegian National Opera and Ballet
1997	Zap Zombie ("Skjeve Blikk")		Norwegian National Academy of Ballet
1996	Who is the one ("Bønn")	NRK Ballet	Northvision
1996	In Me	Solo	Norwegian Broadcasting Corporation
1995	Dance Macabre	Eurovision. Summer concert Holmenkollen	Norwegian Broadcasting Corporation
1995	Alveberg Evening	20-year anniversary	Carte Blanche
1994	Picasso's Women ("Picassos kvinner")	20 years' anniversary	Henie-Onstad Art Centre
1994	In One	Ballet performed at Carte Blanche, Oslo Dance Ensemble, Brussels (guest appearance)	National College of Dance
1993	Echo ("Ekko")	First prize, Video Dance International Grand Prix.	Norwegian Broadcasting Corporation
1992	Albertville	Artistic director for the Norwegian entry, Olympic Games	Norwegian Broadcasting Corporation
1992	Moments ("Øyeblikk")	Ballet	Oslo Black Box Theatre
1991	Secrets ("Lokk")	Competition for young dancers	EBU
1990	Metropolis	TV portrait of Alveberg	Norwegian Broadcasting Corporation
1990	Fragile ("Glassdrøm")	Dance Film, awarded Video Dance International Grand Prix.	Norwegian Broadcasting Corporation
1989	Volven (Scandinavian saga of creation)	World premiere, tour Denmark, Alborg, Royal Theatre Copenhagen	Norwegian National Opera and Ballet
1988	Amber ("Rav")	Telecasted on NRK, Carte Blanche	Bergen International Festival
1987	Spirits	Ballet, telecasted on ZDF, Competition for young dancers	EBU
1986	YR	Solo Alveberg.	Norwegian Broadcasting Corporation
1985	Ashes, Mist, Windblown Dust ("Aske, Skodde, Støv for Vinden")	TV ballet from Ibsen's Peer Gynt.Prix Italia Jury's special prize. Winner Amanda Award, winner Dance for Camera, New York. Winner Video Dance International Grand Prix (2 awards).	Norwegian Broadcasting Corporation
1985	Media	Solo Alveberg. Competition for young dancers	EBU Norwegian Broadcasting Corporation
1985	Now ("Nå")	Winner: Dance Critics' Award, The Norwegian National Ballet	Norwegian National Opera and Ballet
1985	Beyond reach ("Utenfor rekkevidde")	TV production as dancer/choreographer	Norwegian Broadcasting Corporation
1983/1984	6 Dance Videos	Summer concert Holmenkollen	NRK Eurovision
1981	Exodus	Solo dancede by Marianne Skovli	Norwegian Broadcasting Corporation
1981	Blue	Solo danced by Indra Lorentzen	Norwegian Broadcasting Corporation
1980	Sweet & sour Journey ("Reise i sur-søt saus")		Norsk Danseteater, Norwegian Broadcasting Corporation
1979	Decadans ("Dekadans")	Workshop, young choreographers	Norwegian National Opera and Ballet
1979	Creations ("Skapelser")	NRK's 10th anniversary, performed at Henie-Onstad Museum	Norwegian Broadcasting Corporation
1976	Wish you were here ("Skulle ønske du var her")	TV Ballet, regi Istvan Korda Kovacs	Norwegian Broadcasting Corporation
1975	Foot ("Fot")	Ballet	Studio Oscar
1975	Tomorrow? ("Imorgen?")	Ballet workshop at The Norwegian National Ballet	Norwegian Broadcasting Corporation

== Publications ==
- Visions - Eye on Dance Press Forlag (2007)

Visions – Eye on Dance is a book documenting Alveberg's work in dance, including stage and screen productions presented in large-format digital paintings. The book includes works influenced by classical literature and art, as well as material related to her creative process and production work.

== Awards and honors ==
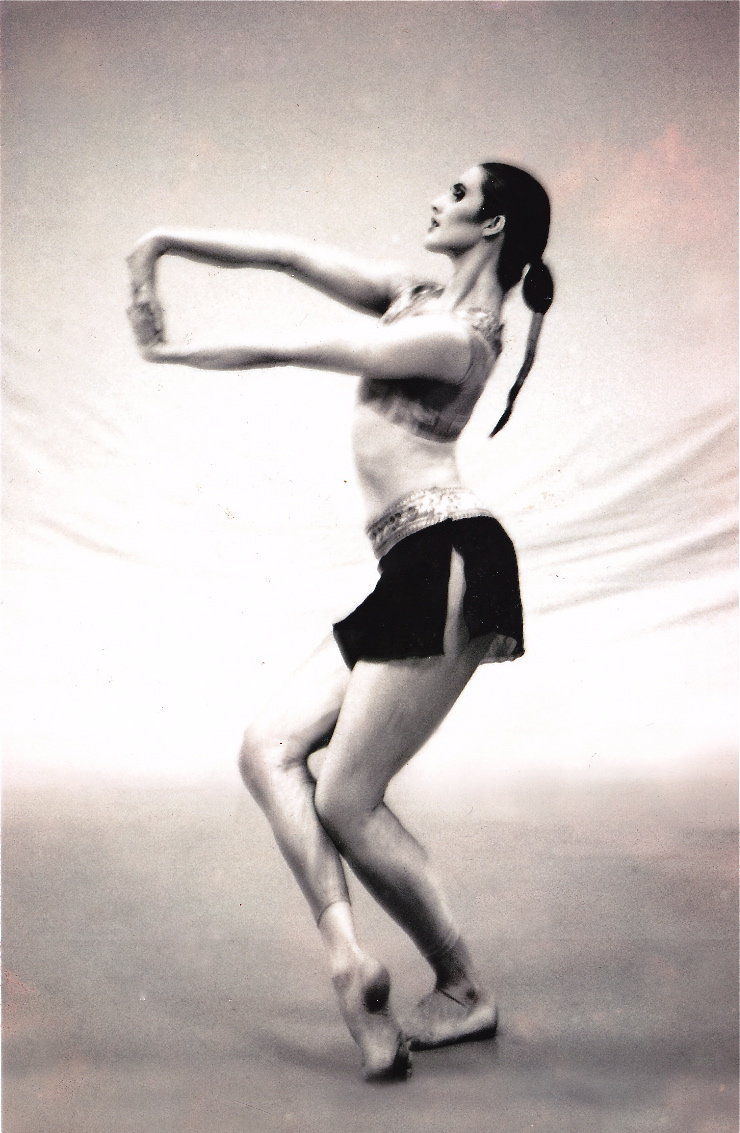

- 2008: Aase Bye's award
- 2006: StudySphere selected Alveberg's website as one of the best educational resources on the Web in the category "Choreography & Choreographers"
- 2005: Visions — Eye on Dance, Biography of Alveberg
- Head of the Telenor Culture Award jury
- 2002: Oslo City Culture Award
- 1998: The Norwegian Center for the Art of Dance — Prize of Honour
- 1997: Telenor Culture Award. "Limitless Communication"
- 1996: Festival International. Program Audiovisuel. "Dance Macabre"
- 1994: Video Dance International Grand Prix. "Echo", TV ballet, First prize. TV Transmission
- 1990: Video Dance International Grand Prix. "Fragile", TV ballet
- 1989: Video Dance International Grand Prix. "Ashes, Mist, Windblown Dust", Jury's special Award (two prizes)
- 1988: Dance on Camera, New York. "Ashes, Mist, Windblown Dust"
- 1987: Amanda Award/(Norwegian Oscar). "Ashes, Mist, Windblown Dust" (Free Artistic)
- 1985: Prix Italia Jury's special Award. "Ashes, Mist, Windblown Dust"
- 1985: Dance Critics' Award "Now"
- 1985: Prix Italia, third prize. "Beyond Reach"
- 1984: Oslo City art award

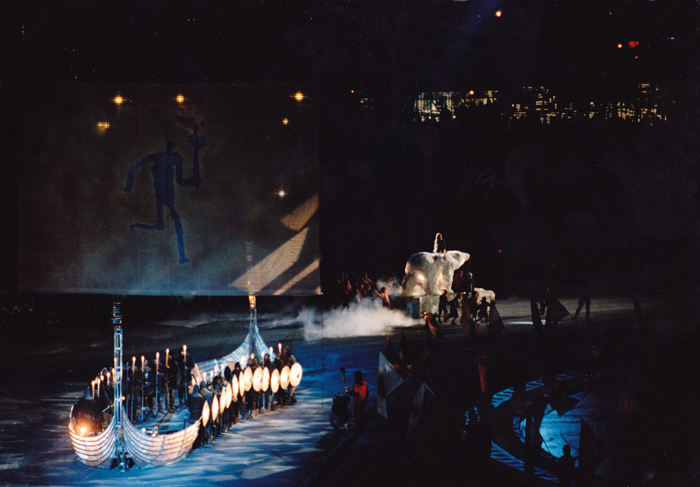
Kjersti Alveberg creating the Norwegian Olympic Ceremony in Albertville, France
