= Norwegian National Academy of Opera =

Coordinates: 59°55′31″N 10°45′17″E

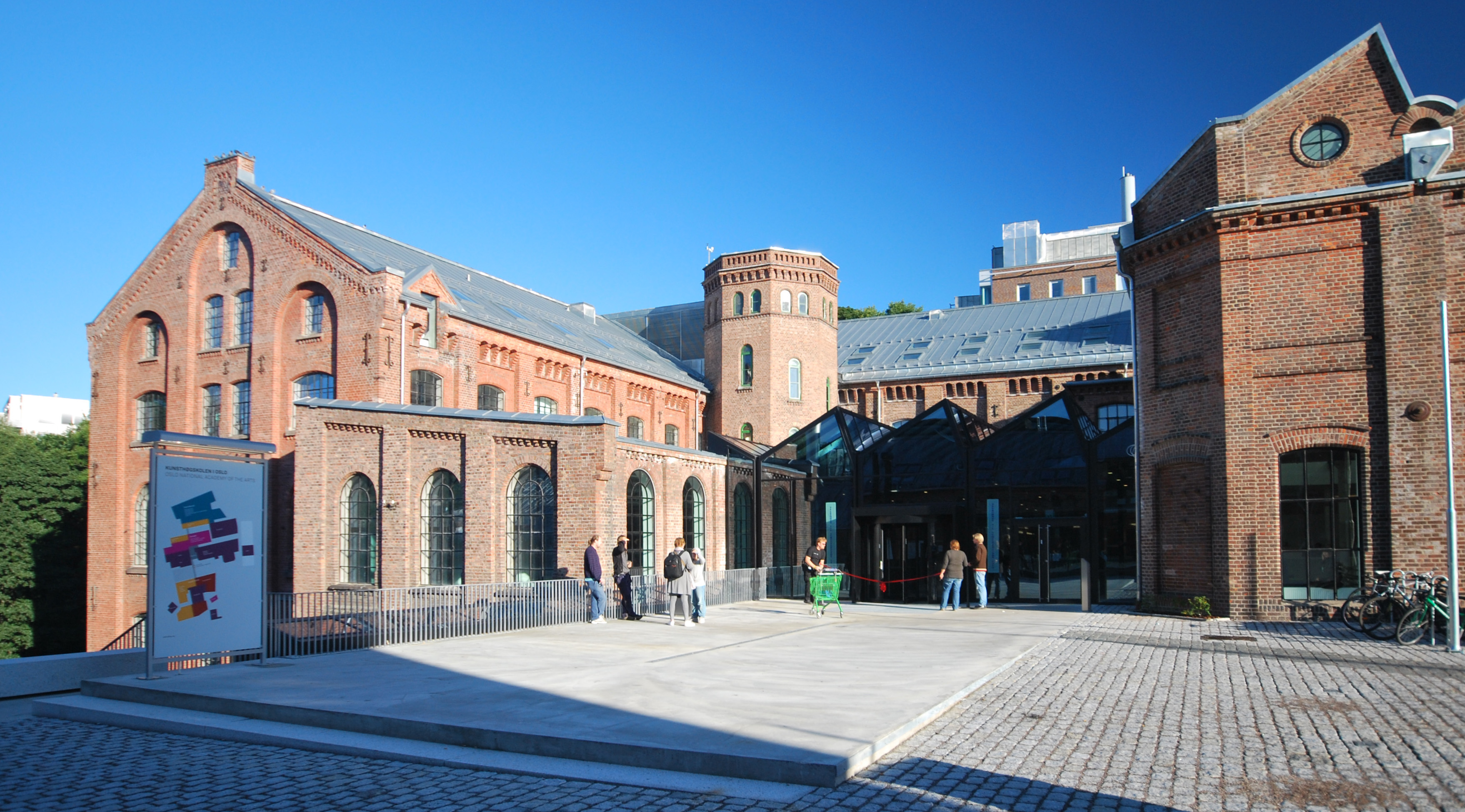
Kunsthogskolen Oslo entrance

The Norwegian National Academy of Opera (Norwegian: Statens operahøgskole) is a former educational institution in Oslo, Norway, now part of Oslo National Academy of the Arts (Kunsthøgskolen i Oslo.

It was established in 1964 to provide a two-year education and accreditation in opera, and the school was given collegiate status in 1982. In 1996 the National Academy of Opera became part of Oslo National Academy of the Arts (Kunsthøgskolen i Oslo, KHiO), along with the Norwegian National Academy of Craft and Art Industry, the Norwegian National Academy of Fine Arts, the Norwegian National Academy of Ballet, and the National Academy of Theatre (Statens teaterhøgskole).
