= Robert Levin (Norwegian pianist) =

Norwegian classical pianist and composer

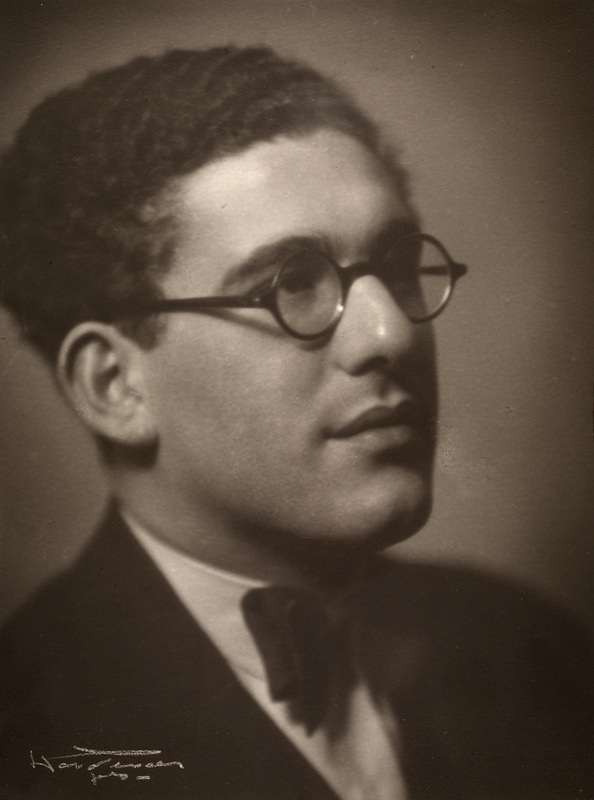
Norwegian pianist Robert Levin in the 1930s

Robert Levin (6 June 1912 – 29 October 1996) was a Norwegian classical pianist and composer. Although he was an accomplished solo pianist and composer, Levin received international acclaim for his work as an accompanist with several of the world's most celebrated vocal and instrumental performers.

== Background ==
Levin was born in Kristiania (now Oslo), Norway. He grew up in the immigrant neighborhood in Grünerløkka, the child of David Levin (1882–1936) and Marie Scheer (1885–1954). Both were Jewish refugees from Lithuania who had immigrated in 1905. Levin's father supported his family through various means, including peddling sewing notions and carting coal.

Levin caught interest in the piano when he was four and a half years old, at his grandmother's home. By the time he was five, he had taught himself well enough for his first public performance. He did not receive formal lessons until he was ten, and when he was twelve he was accepted by the pre-eminent music teacher of the time, Nils Larsen. Levin did his part to support the family by performing at restaurants, bars, and movie theaters during the silent film era. He only finished the first six years of public schooling. He learned at the synagogue for his bar mitzvah, but was mostly occupied with his music. He was also an avid reader of diverse literature.

== Early professional career ==
Like many of the classical musicians of pre-World War II era, Levin played at restaurants to support himself. He rose through the unofficial ranks as a teenager, overcoming strong antisemitic barriers. He took private lessons with concertmaster Gustav Fredrik Lange (1861–1939) and notably composer Fartein Valen (1887–1952), being exposed to a wide range of musical traditions and innovations. Levin was the last living silent movie veteran when he died in 1996. He also became an accomplished accordion player during this time. Levin had his performance debut on 26 January 1932 to widespread acclaim. Levin was introduced to several strains of modern music when he was engaged in the orchestra at Theatercafeen, where the Norwegian exponent of neo-Classical music Carl Gustav Sparre Olsen (1903–1984) performed. The orchestra also introduced Levin to jazz music.

== War years ==
After Norway was occupied by Nazi Germany in 1940, Levin continued to perform but was subjected to daily threats and restrictions on the venues and music he could play. When Nazi authorities in occupied Norway started arresting and deporting Jews, Levin went under cover with friends and eventually fled to Sweden. The rest of his family arrived in Sweden a few days later, but many of Levin's closest relatives were deported from Norway and were victims of the Holocaust in Auschwitz.

Levin became a proponent of Norwegian music and culture while in exile in Sweden. He wrote the music to several patriotic Norwegian songs, including Kirkenesmarsjen, a march to commemorate the liberation of the Northern Norwegian town of Kirkenes by Soviet troops on 25 October 1944. Sponsored by the Norwegian government-in-exile and Svenska Norgeshjälpen, Levin performed for members of the Norwegian Resistance Movement in Sweden along with his wife Solveig, Randi Heide Steen, Ernst Glaser, Gunnar Sønstevold, Hugo Kramm, Gunnar Reiss Andersen, Axel Kielland, Lauritz Falk, Sonja Mjøen, and others. Levin also sent packages to musical colleagues in Oslo under the pseudonym Banjo-Lasse.

After the Liberation of Norway the Levin family returned to one of the central train stations in Oslo in June 1945. The orchestra which Robert Levin had to leave nearly three years earlier awaited him at the platform, performing at their arrival.

== Post-war career ==
After the war, Levin decided to concentrate more on a classical career, and after he accompanied Gösta Kjellertz, his career as an accompanist took off. He accompanied such diverse international artists as Elisabeth Schwarzkopf, Yehudi Menuhin, Roberta Peters, Rita Streich, Henryk Szeryng, Ann Brown, Kim Borg, Camilla Wicks, Felicia Weathers; and a panorama of Norwegian artists that included Ingrid Bjoner, Knut Skram, Arve Tellefsen, Terje Tønnesen, Elise Båtnes, Aase Nordmo Løvberg, Edith Thallaug, and Ole Bøhn.

Notably, on 22 May 1984, he and American pianist Robert D. Levin, performed together in Carnegie Hall in a concert called "From Grieg to Gershwin" with then Crown Prince Harald and Crown Princess Sonja in attendance. The two, along with other musicians including Ole Bøhn, Knut Skram, Felicia Weathers, and Ingrid Bjoner performed pieces by Edvard Grieg, Richard Hageman, Harry Owens, Aaron Copland, Celius Dougherty, Oley Speaks, George Gershwin.

Levin took part in performing tours all around the world. He became one of the most respected classical musicians of his time in Norway. He took an active part in music education at all ages, led the Norwegian Society of Composers and Lyricists (NOPA), and promoted the art of accompaniment. He was the first rector of the Norwegian Academy of Music when it was founded in 1973, where he was also a professor of interpretation. When the academy moved to its new facilities in Majorstuen in 1989, one of the performance halls was named after Levin.

== Awards ==
Levin received the Houens legat (1951) and Statens kunstnerstipend (1954). Levin was awarded the Norwegian Music Critics Award (Musikkritikerprisen) (1956/57), Lindemanprisen (1983) and Spellemannprisen (1977). He was also awarded the King's Medal of Merit (Kongens fortjenstmedalje) in gold and was made a member of the Order of St Olaf. In 1993, he was awarded the Anders Jahre Cultural Prize (Anders Jahres kulturpris) jointly with Stein Mehren.

== Personal life ==
In 1938, he married Solveig Margrethe Bernstein (1914–2023). They were the parents of journalist, Mona Levin (born 1939). Their daughter, Sidsel Levin (born 1944) was music teacher and cultural facilitator at the Jewish Museum in Oslo. Levin died during 1996 at the age of 84 and was buried at Østre gravlund in Oslo.

== Other sources ==
- Robert Levin and Mona Levin (1983) Med livet i hendene (Oslo: Cappelen) ISBN 82-02-09034-2
