= Norwegian National Academy of Fine Arts =

Art school in Oslo, Norway

Coordinates: 59°55′03″N 10°43′58″E

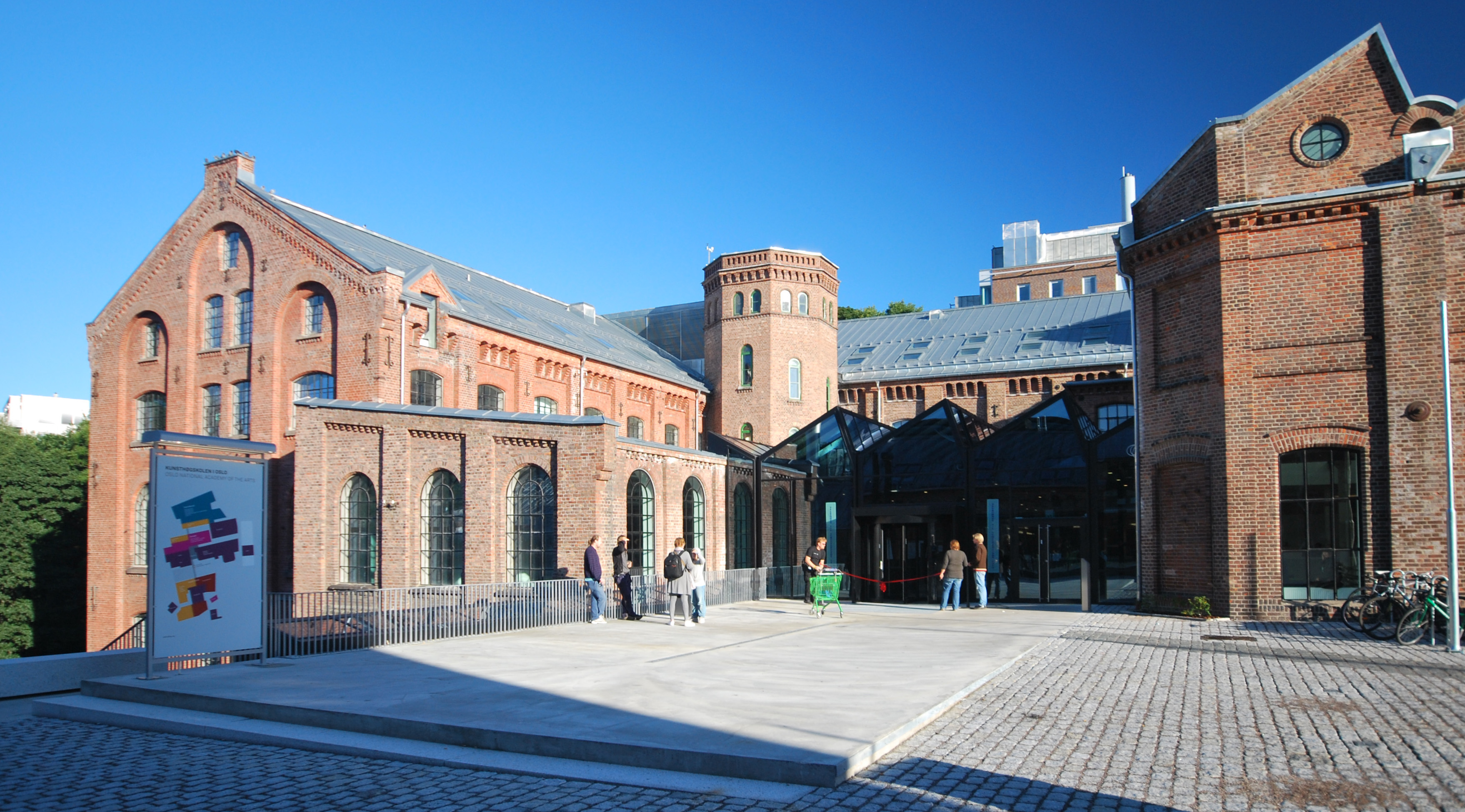
Oslo National Academy of the Arts at Grünerløkka

The Norwegian National Academy of Arts (Norwegian: Statens kunstakademi) was a former Norwegian tertiary institution in Oslo, offering studies in the area of fine art. Along with four other academies, it merged to form the Oslo National Academy of the Arts (Norwegian: Kunsthøgskolen i Oslo, KHiO) in 1996. Although now a faculty of KHiO, the Norwegian National Academy of the Arts is still referred to simply as Kunstakademiet (lit. 'Art Academy') by both staff and students.

== History ==
The Art Academy was formerly National Academy of Art (Statens Kunstakademi), an autonomous art academy formed in 1909. The noted Norwegian painter Christian Krogh was one of three professors at the Academy of Art when it was established. The staff additionally included painter Halfdan Strøm and the sculptor Gunnar Utsond (1864–1950).

The Academy was initially organized along the lines of the old master studios. It moved to better premises in the Merchant Building on Drammensveien in central Oslo during 1919, and a special drawing office at the rear of the Kunstnernes Hus in 1930. From 1935 to 1940, the Danish painter and architect Georg Jacobsen worked in an extraordinary professorship in art construction and composition teaching.

In 1941, the collaborationist Quisling regime called for new arrangements of the academy and added painter and Nasjonal Samling party member Søren Onsager as a professor.

In 1996 the academy merged with the formerly independent Arts and Crafts, Opera, Ballet, and Theatre academies to form the Oslo National Academy of Art (Kunsthøgskole i Oslo), the nation's largest arts college. The former Kunstakademiet then became the Faculty of Visual Arts within the KhiO administration organisation. Although now a faculty of KHiO, the Norwegian National Academy of the Arts is still referred to simply as Kunstakademiet (Art Academy) by both staff and students.

In August 2010 all the schools physically merged into a new building in a former sail factory, Christiania Seildugsfabrik, in Grünerløkka, on the east side of Oslo. Forming one of the largest art academies in Europe. The Kunstakademi has its own semi-autonomous power of operations, its own quarters and studios, as well as its own academic and admissions programs.
