= Terje Mærli =

Norwegian theatre directors

- Born: 24 December 1940 (age 85); Oslo, Norway
- Occupations: Playwright and theatre director
- Awards: Amanda Award; Norwegian Theatre Critics Award

Terje Mærli (born 24 December 1940) is a Norwegian playwright, stage director and theatre director.

He was born in Oslo to Steffen Mærli and Inga Lysew. He was stage instructor at the Oslo Nye Teater from 1970 to 1976, at Fjernsynsteatret from 1976 to 1986, and Nationaltheatret from 1987 to 1992. He was theatre director at Trøndelag Teater from 1993 to 1997. He received the Amanda Award for the television movie Du kan da ikke bare gå in 1986, and for Fugleelskerne in 1989. He was awarded the Norwegian Theatre Critics Award in 1988.
