= Oslo National Academy of the Arts =

University college in Oslo, Norway

- Kunsthøgskolen i Oslo
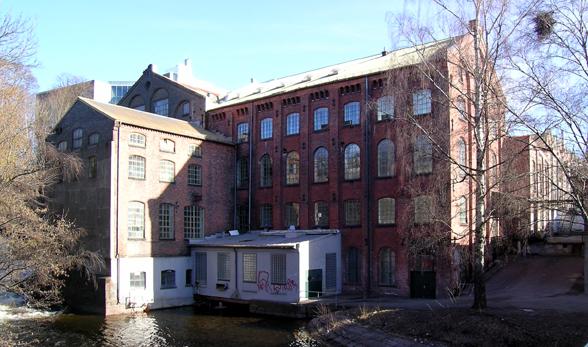
- Type: Art Academy
- Established: 1 August 1996; 29 years ago
- Rector: Marianne Skjulhaug
- Administrative staff: 181
- Students: 559 (2016–2017)
- Location: Oslo, Norway; 59°55′32″N 10°45′16″E
- Campus: 43,000 m^{2} (460,000 sq ft)
- Nickname: KHIO
- Website: khio.no/en
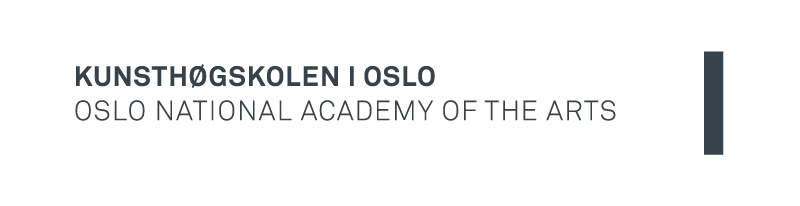

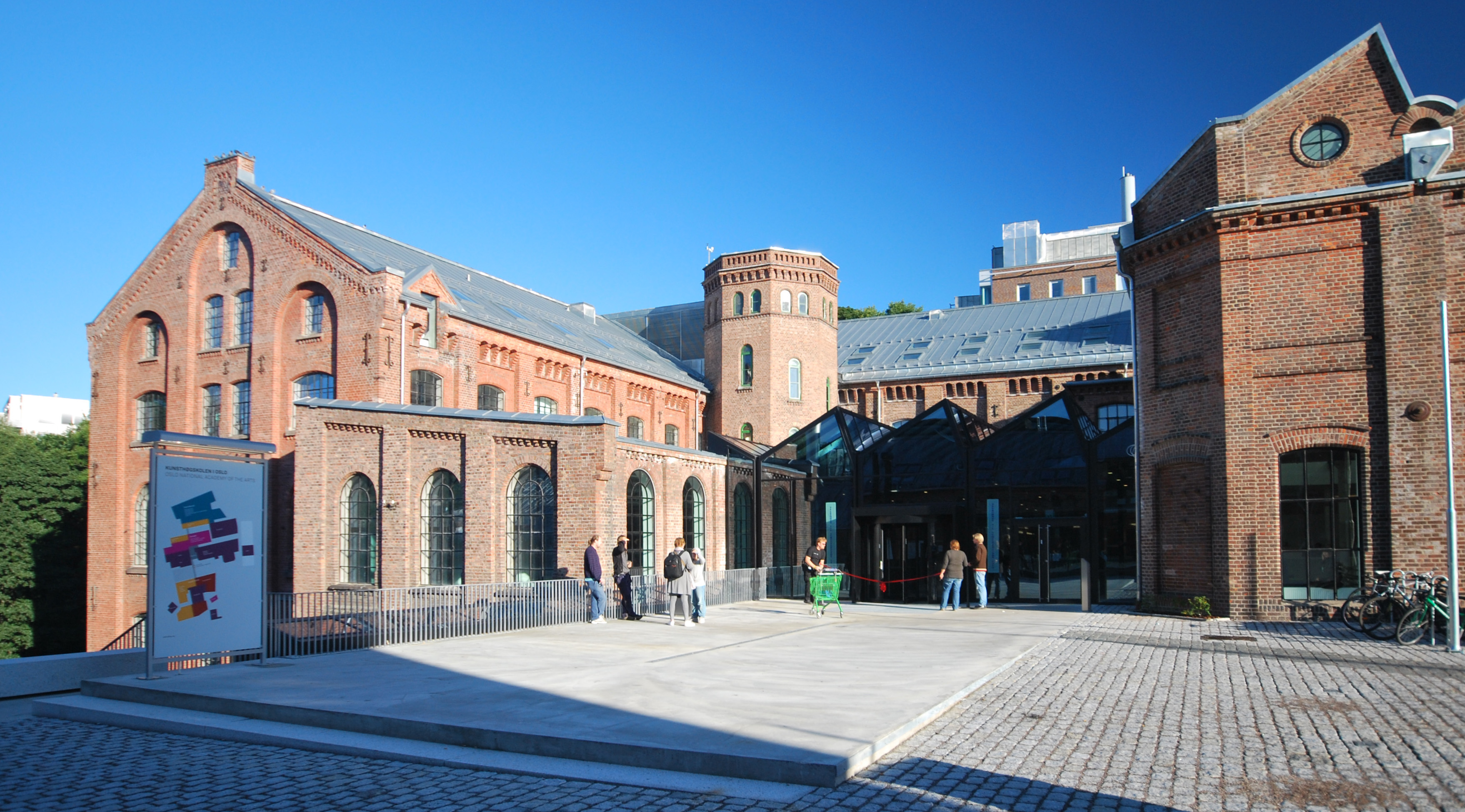
Kunsthogskolen Oslo entrance

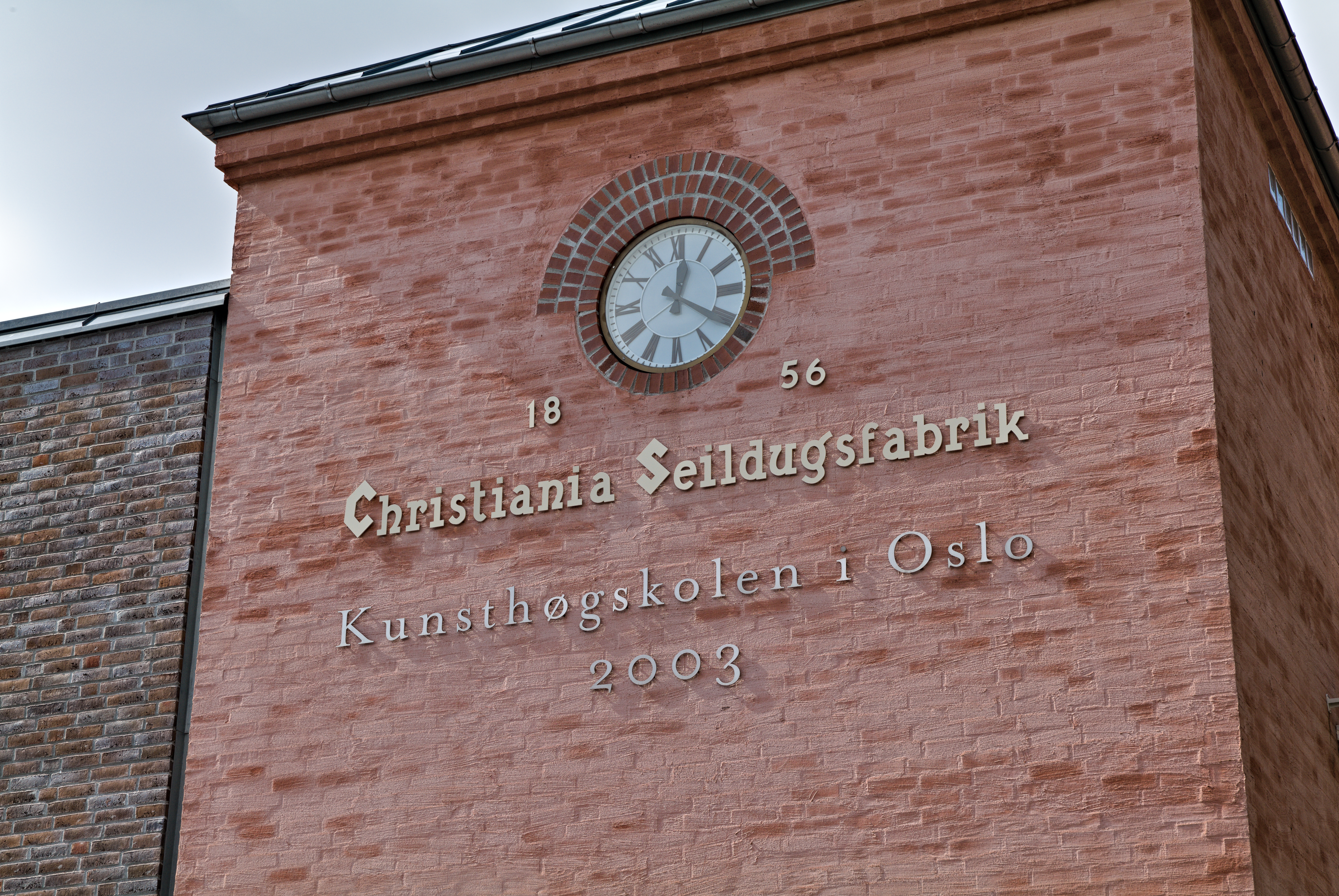
Christiania Seildugsfabrik sign and clock

The Oslo National Academy of the Arts (Norwegian: Kunsthøgskolen i Oslo, KHiO) is a tertiary institution in Oslo, Norway, that provides education in visual arts, design and performing arts. It is one of two public institutes of higher learning in Norway that teaches in visual arts and design, the other being the Bergen National Academy of the Arts in Bergen.

KHiO was created by merging five former colleges, or national academies: of Arts and Crafts; Fine Arts; Opera; Ballet, and Theatre (Statens teaterhøgskole).

== History ==
The Academy was established in 1996 through the amalgamation of five independent colleges:

- The National Academy of Craft and Art Industry (Statens håndverks- og kunstindustriskole), founded in 1818
- The National Academy of Fine Arts (Statens kunstakademi), founded in 1909
- The National Academy of Theatre (Statens teaterhøgskole), founded in 1952
- The National Academy of Opera (Statens operahøgskole), founded in 1964
- The National Academy of Ballet (Statens balletthøgskole), founded in 1979

The Oslo National Academy of the Arts was formerly housed in several buildings in Oslo. In the summer of 2003, the Faculty of Performing Arts (Theatre) was moved to the new campus at the old textile plant Seilduken at Grünerløkka in central Oslo. In the summer of 2010, the remaining faculties joined.

In 2007, KHiO was ranked among the world's 60 best design programs by Bloomberg Businessweek.

== Description and location ==
The Oslo National Academy of the Arts (KHiO) is an art academy in Oslo, Norway, that provides education in visual arts, design, and performing arts. KHiO is situated next to the river Akerselva, where the Academy rents a total space of 43,000 m^{2} (460,000 sq ft).

The Academy occupies the former Christiania Seildugsfabrik, a factory which made sails for ships. There is a blue ceramic Oslo Byes Vel plaque located at the entrance to the building's car park, which reads "Society for Oslo Byes Vel. Christiania Seildugsfabrik. Founded in 1856, closed 1960. Architect P.H. Holtermann".

== Governance and academic staff ==
As of 2024 Marianne Skjulhaug is the rector of the school.

The Faculty of Visual Arts included two professorships from the start. Jan Valentin Sæther occupied the professorship for painting from 1996 until 2002, whereas Istvan Lisztes was the first professor of sculpture.

Current professors include Michael O'Donnell, A. K. Dolven, Synne Bull, Dag Erik Elgin, Henrik Plenge Jakobsen, Aeron Bergman, Susanne Winterling, Jeannette Christensen and Stian Grøgaard.

== Faculties and departments ==
These former colleges are now organised in three faculties: the Faculty of Design, the Faculty of Performing Arts, and the Faculty of Visual Arts. The Academy is divided into academic departments, with responsibility for the various subject areas, and administrative sections, which handle shared administrative tasks.

=== Faculty of Design ===
The Design department has academic responsibility for educational programmes in graphic design, illustration, fashion design, costume design, interior design and furniture design. The Design department offers both Master's and Bachelor's programmes in graphic design, illustration, fashion design, costume design, interior design and furniture design.

The Design department started life as Statens håndverks- og industriskole (Oslo National College of Art and Design) (SHKS), founded in 1818. The department is constantly seeking to develop the legacy and craft traditions of the SHKS, and regards its various workshop facilities as central to this effort.

=== Faculty of Visual Arts ===
The Art and Craft department has academic responsibility for educational programmes in textile art, printmaking and drawing, ceramic art, and metal and jewellery art.

The Academy of Fine Art has academic responsibility for educational programmes in fine art. It works across media, disciplines and approaches, exploring questions of form and material as well as post-conceptual, social and political issues.

=== Faculty of Performing Arts ===
The Academy of Theatre has academic responsibility for educational programmes for actors and theatre directors, offering specialisations in acting, direction, stage writing and scenography, and a postgraduate certificate in education for drama teachers. Since its founding in 1953, the Academy of Theatre has been Norway's leading educational institution for the acting professions. The Academy offers a three-year Bachelor's course for actors and directors and a two-year Master's course in theatre, specialising in acting, direction, stage writing, and stage design. The department also offers a practice-oriented teacher training course (PPU) for drama teachers.

The Academy of Dance has academic responsibility for educational programmes for choreographers and dancers in the fields of contemporary dance, classical ballet and jazz dance, and a postgraduate certificate in education for dance teachers. The Academy of Dance was founded in 1979 as the National College of Ballet and Dance (Statens ballettskole). Since 1996 it has been part of KHiO.

The Academy of Opera has academic responsibility for educational programmes in the field of opera, developing vocal and acting skills, with an emphasis on stage productions.

== Alumni ==
- Edvard Munch (Statens kunstakademi)
- Renate Reinsve
