= Adelaide von Skilondz =

Russian opera singer

Skilondz in Lakmé at Royal Swedish Opera, 1916

Adelaide Andreyeva von Skilondz (also Swedish: Adelaide Andrejewa von Skilondz; 27 January [O.S. 15 January] 1882 – 5 April 1969) was a Russian operatic coloratura soprano.

== Career ==
She was born in Saint Petersburg, the daughter of daughter of Colonel Leo Andreyev and Adelaide Christman. Showing talent for the piano, she trained initially as a concert pianist, with Felix Blumenfeld at the Saint Petersburg Conservatory, where she also studied composition with Anatoly Lyadov and harmony with Nikolai Rimsky-Korsakov. She later switched to study voice, and began her career in 1904.

In 1909 she sang the role of the Queen of Shemakha in the Saint Petersburg premiere of Nikolai Rimsky-Korsakov's opera The Golden Cockerel. She had married Vladimir von Skilondz, a government official, in 1905, thereafter being known by either his surname or hers, or both. In 1910 she left him and her career in Russia, initially hoping to join the Dresden Court opera. Although there was no opening in Dresden, she won a contract with the Berlin Hofoper where she succeeded Frieda Hempel, singing leading roles until the start of World War I. Her marriage was formally dissolved in 1912.

Among the roles she sang in Berlin was that of Zerbinetta in the premiere of Ariadne auf Naxos, under the baton of the composer Richard Strauss. She recorded several excerpts from the opera shortly after the premiere, which are among the c.60 records she made for the Gramophone company, Parlophone, Ariel and Pathé mostly in the years 1912-1913.

At the start of the war, as a Russian in Germany she was considered ‘the enemy’ so moved to Stockholm where she joined the Royal Swedish Opera. During 1915 she performed at the Finnish National Opera in Helsinki. In the summer of 1915 she returned to St Petersburg, but she also found herself regarded with suspicion there for her German connections, so returned to Stockholm where, after the death of Anna Oscàr, she took on the leading roles at the Royal Opera.

She performed in Stockholm in opera up until 1920, continuing to give occasional guest performances until 1925, and in concert performances until 1931. Her roles included the Queen of the Night in Mozart's The Magic Flute (64 times), the title role in Donizetti's Lucia di Lammermoor, and Gilda in Verdi's Rigoletto. She sang in 252 performances before retiring. She also sang in Berlin, Dresden and Helsinki again, and in Czechoslovakia, France and England before her retirement in 1931.

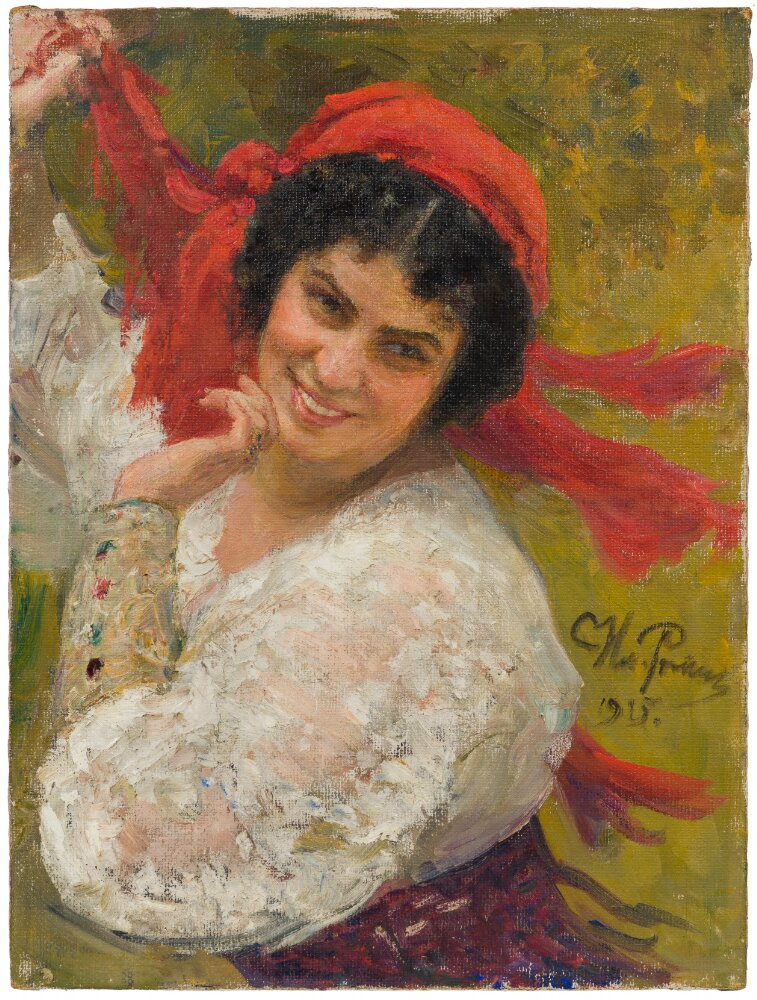
Skilondz, painted by Ilya Repin, c.1915-1925

In 1917 she received the order Litteris et Artibus, and in 1921 she was elected a member of the Royal Academy of Music, initially as Foreign Member No. 247 and, after taking Swedish citizenship in 1930, as Member No. 601.

Skilondz was painted three times by Ilya Repin, and had one of the portraits in her Stockholm apartment.

== As singing teacher ==
During the First World War, Skilondz had opened her large apartment in central Stockholm to Russian refugees. After her retirement from the stage, she taught singing there. Among her students were Kerstin Meyer, Kim Borg, Eva Gustavson, Eva Prytz, and Elisabeth Söderström. She died in Stockholm at the age of 87.

In September 1939, the employers’ association confiscated her apartment, but she was able to move to another at Strandvägen 31 and continue teaching; it was also big enough to host concerts for up to 250 guests.

== Death ==
After Stalin’s death, von Skilondz’s sisters Katja and Selinka left Russia and joined her in Stockholm. They helped care for her in her old age. Adelaide von Skilondz died in Stockholm on 5 April, 1969, at the age of 87. She is buried in the city cemetery, the Skogskyrkogården.
