= Randi Helseth =

Norwegian singer

- Born: February 9, 1905; Oslo, Norway
- Died: September 24, 1991 (aged 86)
- Occupation: Singer

Randi Helseth (February 9, 1905 – September 24, 1991) was a Norwegian singer.

Helseth was born in Oslo. She made her debut in 1934 as a concert singer, and in 1938 as an opera singer. Helseth was associated with the National Theatre in Oslo, the National Theater in Bergen, and the Norwegian National Opera, and she performed as a soloist both in Norway and abroad, including the United States. She taught the soprano Solveig Kringlebotn.

Helseth won the Norwegian Music Critics Award for 1949/1950. In May 2000, a bust of Helseth by Nina Sundbye was unveiled in Ås.

== Discography ==
- Randi Helseth. Pro Musica, 1985
