= Hanne Skram =

Norwegian dancer (1937–2017)

- Born: November 14, 1937; Bærum, Norway
- Died: January 11, 2017 (aged 79); Oslo, Norway
- Occupation: Dancer
- Spouse: Knut Skram

Hanne Marie Skram (née Thorstensen, November 14, 1937 – January 11, 2017) was a Norwegian dancer.

Skram trained at Alfhild Grimsgaard's ballet school and in Paris, London, and New York. She became a dancer at the Norwegian National Opera and Ballet in 1959. She became the principal dancer in 1968 and had a number of solo roles. For 18 years she led the Hanne Skram Ballet School. She was married to Knut Skram, with whom she had two children: the lawyer Kristin Skram Brændvang and the composer Henrik Skram.

== Solo dance performances ==
- Brian Macdonald's Pointe Counterpointe (retitled Aimez-vous Bach?)
- Birgit Cullberg's Miss Julie as Julie
- Frédéric Chopin's Les Sylphides
- Pyotr Ilyich Tchaikovsky's Swan Lake as Odette
- Pyotr Ilyich Tchaikovsky's The Nutcracker
- Sergei Prokofiev's Romeo and Juliet as Juliet
- Sergei Prokofiev's Cinderella as Cinderella

== Filmography ==
- Millionær for en aften as a dancer
