= Halfdan Strøm =

Norwegian painter (1863–1949)

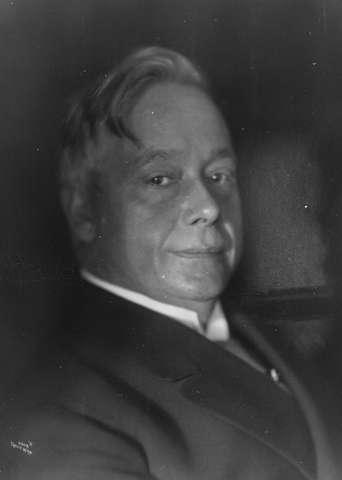
Halfdan Strøm in 1921

Halfdan Strøm (4 November 1863 – 28 March 1949) was a Norwegian painter and an early representative of realism in Norwegian painting.

He attended the Royal Drawing School in Kristiania (now Oslo). In 1883, he debuted at the Industrial and Art Exhibition at Tullinløkka, site of the Norwegian Geographical Survey in Oslo. During the period 1883–84, he was in Munich. During 1884, he participated in an outdoor academy conducted by Frits Thaulow in Modum.

In 1889, he entered two paintings at the World Exhibition in Paris and achieved an honorable mention for his painting Skomakerverksted (1889). Later Strøm earned gold medals at the World Exhibition of Paris in 1900, as well as international exhibits in Munich in 1901 and San Francisco in 1915. Strøm was a professor at the Norwegian National Academy of Fine Arts from 1909 to 1935, and Director there from 1924.

Strøm was decorated Knight, First Class of the Royal Norwegian Order of St. Olav in 1910, and was a Commander of the Danish Order of the Dannebrog.

He is represented in the National Gallery of Norway with several paintings, including Fra Arbeidersamfunnets kafé i Torvgaten(1888), Emil Hannover (1899) and Fra Grøntbasaren (1905).
