= Norwegian Critics' Association =

Organization of newspaper and broadcast critics

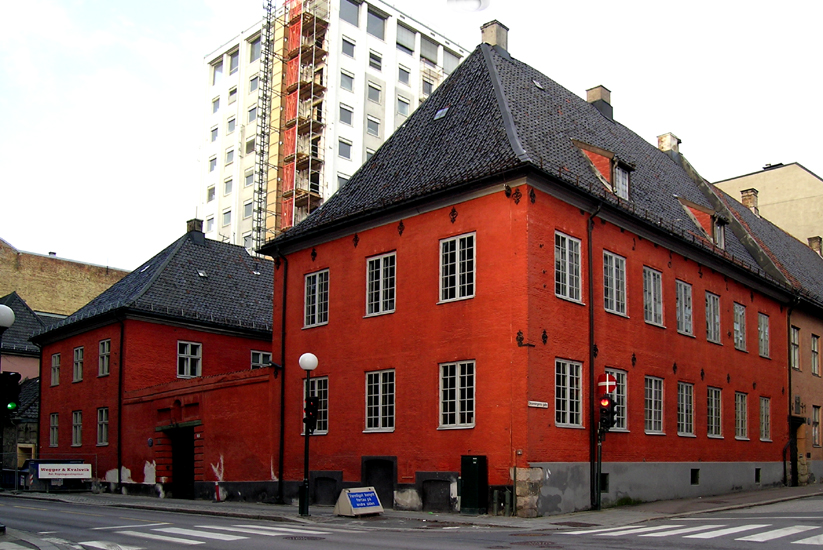
The Norwegian Critics' Association offices are located at Garmanngaarden in Rådhusgata 7, Oslo in one of the city's oldest houses.

The Norwegian Critics' Association (Norsk litteraturkritikerlag) is an organization for Norwegian critics in the newspaper and broadcasting professions.

Former independent critic teams merged into Norwegian Critics Association in 1998. The oldest team was founded in 1927 as the Norwegian Theatre and Music Critics Association (Norsk Teater- og Musikkritikerforening). Critics teams in literature and art were created respectively in 1946 (Norwegian Literature Critics) and 1949 (Norwegian Art Critics).

The association was initially created to promote a high standard of critical ethics. The association aims to safeguard the members' professional and economic interests while promoting quality in the arts and striving for quality and independence in criticism. This organization arranges seminars, meetings, open debates, and writing courses, which mark the critics role in public and creative environments.

One of their most significant contributions to Norwegian culture is the award of the Norwegian Critics Prize for Literature (Kritikerprisen for årets beste voksenbok or Kritikerprisen), which has been awarded every year since 1950. The prize is presented to a Norwegian author for a literary work as agreed to among the members. Other significant contributions to Norwegian cultural life are the Norwegian Theatre Critics Award (Teaterkritikerprisen or Kritikerprisen), which has been awarded every year since 1939 (except 1940–45), the Norwegian Music Critics Award (Musikkritikerprisen or Kritikerprisen), which has been awarded every year since 1947, and the Norwegian Dance Critics Award (Dansekritikerprisen or Kritikerprisen), which has been awarded every year since 1977.

Since 1978 they have also awarded Kritikerprisen for årets beste skjønnlitterære barne- eller ungdomsbok, a prize for the best work of children's literature. Since 1994, Prisen Årets litteraturkritiker, has been awarded for literature criticism. Starting during 2003, the Association introduced the Critics prize for the best translation (Kritikerprisen for beste oversettelse).

== Sections of the organization ==
- Art: 80 members (2005)
- Literature: 176 members
- Theater, music and dance: 69 members
