= Jonas Bendiksen =

Norwegian photojournalist (born 1977)

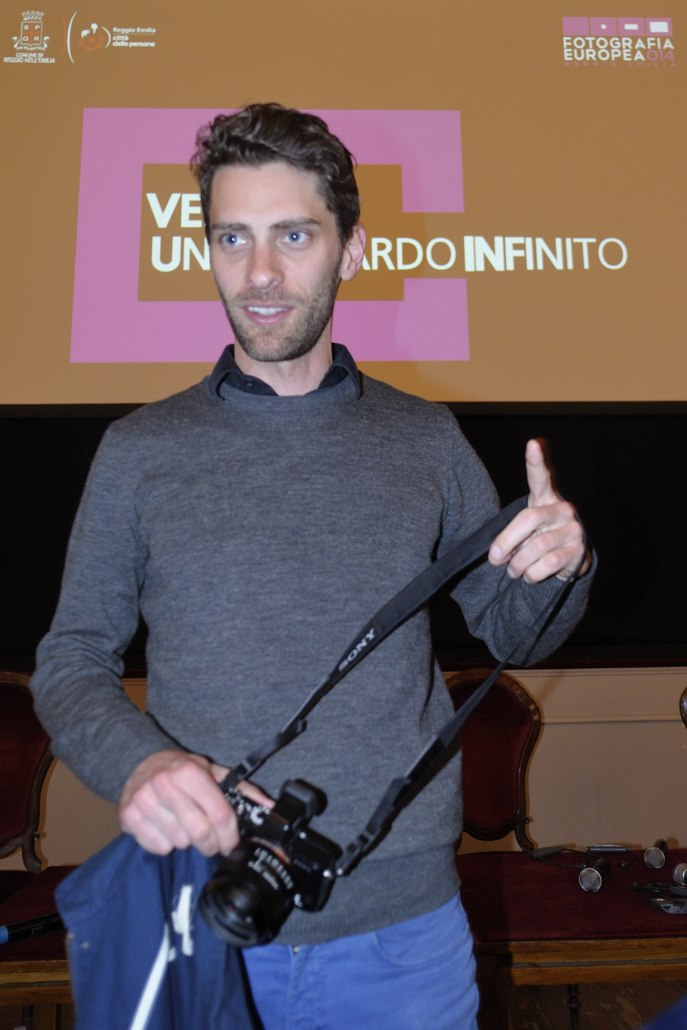
- Born: 1977 (age 48–49); Tønsberg, Norway
- Occupation: Photojournalist
- Organization: Magnum Photos
- Notable work: Satellites (2006); The Places We Live (2008); The Last Testament (2017); The Book of Veles (2021)
- Children: 3
- Website: jonasbendiksen.com

Jonas Bendiksen (born 1977) is a Norwegian photojournalist based near Oslo. He has published the books Satellites (2006) and The Places We Live (2008) and received awards from World Press Photo, International Center of Photography, National Magazine Awards and Pictures of the Year International. Bendiksen is a member of Magnum Photos and has served as its president.

== Life and work ==
Bendiksen was born in Tønsberg, in Vestfold county, southern Norway in 1977.

He lived in Russia for several years. The time he spent there resulted in his book, Satellites - Photographs from the Fringes of the former Soviet Union, about separatist republics in the former USSR, published in 2006.

For three years he photographed slum communities in Nairobi in Kenya, Mumbai in India, Jakarta in Indonesia, and Caracas in Venezuela, for The Places We Live, a book published in 2008, and an exhibition containing projections and voice recordings.

Bendiksen became a Magnum Photos nominee in 2004 and a member in 2008. In 2010 he was its president.

The Last Testament (2017) follows seven men around the world who claim to be the Second Coming of Jesus Christ.

In 2021, in The Book of Veles, Bendiksen departed from the photojournalism practice by creating a conceptual work about "fake news" which consisted of images that were "faked" using CGI to place humans and bears in scenes that Bendiksen had photographed devoid of life, mixed with excerpts from The Book of Veles (a forged ancient text), and AI-generated texts. The deception, initially not disclosed, escaped detection from his colleagues at Magnum, and then curators and audiences at the Visa Pour l'Image festival, until Bendiksen revealed it on the Magnum Photos website. It questioned the ability of the most visually literate people in the photography industry to tell real photos from faked ones.

== Personal life ==
As of 2022, Bendiksen lives with his wife and three children near Oslo.

== Bibliography ==
=== Books ===
- Bendiksen, Jonas (2006). Satellites : photographs from the fringes of the former Soviet Union. New York: Aperture.
- The Places We Live. New York: Aperture, 2008. ISBN 978-1-59711-067-9.
- The Last Testament. New York: Aperture, 2017. ISBN 978-1-59711-428-8.
- The Book of Veles. London: Gost Books, 2021. ISBN 978-1-910401-61-3.

Anthologies

- A Year in Photography: Magnum Archive. Munich: Prestel; New York, Paris, London, Tokyo: Magnum, 2010. ISBN 978-3-7913-4435-5.
- Magnum Contact Sheets. Edited by Kristen Lubben. London: Thames & Hudson, 2011. ISBN 978-0-500-54412-9
- Magnum Contact Sheets. Edited by Kristen Lubben. London: Thames & Hudson, 2014. ISBN 978-0-500-54431-0. Compact edition.

=== Articles ===
- Bendiksen, Jonas (August 2017). "Messiah complex". National Geographic. 232 (2): 82–93.

== Exhibitions ==
- 2007: Welcome to Nowhere, Stills Gallery, Sydney. Part of New Blood, Magnum Photos 60th anniversary exhibition. With Trent Parke, Antoine D'Agata, Mark Power and Alec Soth.
- 2008: Satellites: Jonas Bendiksen, Art Institute of Boston.

== Film appearances ==
- Space Tourists (2009). Directed by Christian Frei. Feature-length documentary.
- Water: Our Thirsty World (2010). Directed by Steven Kochones. 21 minute short.

== Awards ==
- 2003: Infinity Award, Young Photographer category, International Center of Photography, New York.
- 2004: Second prize, Daily Life Stories category, World Press Photo Awards, World Press Photo, Amsterdam.
- 2007: The Paris Review won the Photojournalism category, National Magazine Awards, for Bendiksen's documentary of life in a Nairobi slum, Kibera.
- 2008: Telenor Culture Award, from Telenor, Bærum, Norway.
- 2013: Award of Excellence, Feature Story Editing - Magazine category, Seventieth Pictures of the Year International Competition, Pictures of the Year International with Elizabeth Krist and Elaine Bradley, for "Russian Summer" in National Geographic.
- 2014: First place, Sports Story Editing category, Pictures of the Year International, with Elizabeth Krist and Elaine Bradley, for "On the Trail with the First Skiers" in National Geographic.
- 2014: Award of Excellence, Sports Picture Story category, Pictures of the Year International, for "The Last of the First Skiers".
