= Norwegian Theatre Critics Award =

The Norwegian Theatre Critics Award (Den norske Teaterkritikerprisen or Kritikerprisen) is awarded by the Norwegian Critics' Association (Norsk Kritikerlag) and has been awarded every year since 1939 (except 1940–45). For other Norwegian Critics Awards, see the Norwegian Literature Critics Award, which has been awarded every year since 1950, the Norwegian Music Critics Award, which has been awarded every year since 1947, and the Norwegian Dance Critics Award, which has been awarded every year since 1977.

== Annual Norwegian Theatre Critics Award winners ==
- 1939/40 – Lars Tvinde and Olafr Havrevold
- 1940/41 – Gerd Egede-Nissen
- 1940–45 – Not rewarded
- 1946/47 – Knut Hergel and Hans Jacob Nilsen
- 1947/48 – Ada Kramm
- 1948/49 – Helen Brinchmann
- 1949/50 – Aase Bye
- 1950/51 – Gerda Ring
- 1951/52 – Ragnhild Hald
- 1952/53 – August Oddvar
- 1953/54 – Ola Isene
- 1954/55 – Espen Skjønberg
- 1955/56 – Stein Grieg Halvorsen and Knut Wigert
- 1956/57 – Kolbjørn Buøen
- 1957/58 – Rønnaug Alten
- 1958/59 – Claes Gill
- 1959/60 – Ella Hval
- 1960/61 – Per Aabel
- 1961/62 – Tordis Maurstad
- 1962/63 – Toralv Maurstad
- 1963/64 – Liv Strømsted
- 1964/65 – Wenche Foss
- 1965/66 – Per Sunderland
- 1966/67 – Georg Løkkeberg
- 1967/68 – Lasse Kolstad
- 1968/69 – Aud Schønemann
- 1969/70 – Arne Walentin
- 1970/71 – Henki Kolstad
- 1971/72 – Bjarne Andersen
- 1972/73 – Pål Løkkeberg
- 1973/74 – Frank Robert
- 1974/75 – Jack Fjeldstad
- 1975/76 – Bjørn Endreson
- 1976/77 – Tormod Skagestad
- 1977/78 – Harald Heide Steen
- 1978/79 – Lubos Hruza
- 1979/80 – Ingebjørg Sem
- 1980/81 – Britt Langlie
- 1981/82 – Stein Winge
- 1982/83 – Alexandra Myskova
- 1983/84 – Kjersti Germeten
- 1984/85 – Gisle Straume
- 1985/86 – Rut Tellefsen (did not want to receive the award)
- 1986/87 – Bjørn Sundquist
- 1987/88 – Terje Mærli and Christian Egemar
- 1988/89 – Terje Strømdahl
- 1989/90 – Nils Ole Oftebro
- 1990/91 – Jorunn Kjellsby
- 1991/92 – Jon Eikemo
- 1992/93 – Lise Fjeldstad
- 1993/94 – Helge Hoff Monsen
- 1994/95 – Svein Tindberg
- 1995/96 – Sverre Anker Ousdal
- 1996/97 – Nils Sletta
- 1997/98 – Even Stormoen
- 1998/99 – Yngve Sundvor
- 1999/00 – Kjetil Bang-Hansen
- 2000/01 – Anders Hatlo
- 2001/02 – Hildegunn Eggen
- 2002/03 – Dennis Storhøi
- 2003/04 – Lasse Kolsrud
- 2004/05 – Henrik Rafaelsen
- 2005/06 – Øystein Røger
- 2006/07 – Sven Nordin
- 2007/08 – Vegard Vinge and Ida Müller
- 2008/09 – Eirik Stubø
- 2009/10 – Thorbjørn Harr
- 2010/11 – Heidi Gjermundsen Broch
