= Ingrid Lorentzen =

Norwegian ballet dancer (born 1972)

- Born: 9 March 1972; Trondheim, Norway
- Occupation: Dancer
- Known for: Artistic director of the Norwegian National Ballet.

Ingrid Trøite Lorentzen (born 9 March 1972) is a Norwegian ballet dancer. Since August 2012, she has been artistic director of the Norwegian National Ballet.

== Early life ==
Born in Trondheim, she grew up in the Byåsen district and attended Åsveien Elementary School and Sverresborg Middle School. She received her ballet training at the Norwegian National Academy of Ballet in Oslo (1988–89), and at the Royal Swedish Ballet School in Stockholm. She also studied ballet in New York and Paris.

== Career ==
Lorentzen's breakthrough came in 1991 with her performance of Kjersti Alveberg's Lokk in the Eurovision contest for young dancers. The following year she danced Kristin Lavransdatter in Nidaros Cathedral. From 1995 to 1997 she was with Skånes Danseteater in Malmö. She joined the Norwegian National Ballet in 1997, becoming a principal dancer in 2000. In addition to classical roles such as Odette and Odile in Swan Lake, she has performed as a modern, untraditional ballerina in modern works choreographed by George Balanchine, Glen Tetley, Jiří Kylián, Paul Lightfoot and Sol Lèon and Nacho Duato. In 2001, she received the Norwegian Dance Critics Award for her interpretation of Kim Brandstrup's Place of Stone.

Lorentzen has collaborated with Kjersti Alveberg on Babels barn, Volven (2000) and Nett no (2002). She played the leading role in the film and stage production of Lille Frøken Norge (2003). She has also played Eva Linde in Genanse og verdighet at the National Theatre (2000) and Solveig in Peer Gynt at Torshov Theatre (2004). She was the first dancer to receive Telenor's Communication without Boundaries award in 2004. On 1 August 2012, she was appointed artistic director of the Norwegian National Ballet for a period of five years. Her contract has later been renewed and is currently running until 2022.

== Other responsibilities ==
Ingrid Lorentzen has served on the Arts Council Norway and on the Council’s Dance Committee. She has chaired the jury for the Dream Scholarship offered by the Norwegian Council for Schools of Music and Performing Arts, and has been a member of the Artistic Council for the Ballet Laboratory run by the Norwegian National Opera and Ballet.
