= Ingun Bjørnsgaard =

Norwegian choreographer

Ingun Bjørnsgaard is a Norwegian choreographer.

== Career ==
In 1992, Ingun Bjørnsgaard established her own dance company, Ingun Bjørnsgaard Prosjekt (IBP). With this company she has created more than 10 ballets, touring throughout Norway and a variety of European venues and cities. While developing her art as a choreographer with IBP, Bjørnsgaard has also worked on a regular basis as a visiting choreographer with companies such as the Royal Ballet (Kungliga National Baletten) in Stockholm, Sweden; Skånes Dance Theatre (Skånes Dansteater) in Malmö, Sweden; Carte Blanche in Bergen, Norway; the Norwegian National Theatre (Nationaltheatret) in Oslo; Komische Oper in Berlin; the Norwegian National Ballet (Nasjonalballetten) – among other projects, she created a full-length commissioned ballet for the inauguration of Oslo's new opera house in 2008 − and recently with Nordwest Tanzcompagnie in Bremen and Oldenburg. IBP's characteristic style has evolved gradually over the years in close collaboration with the different dancers that make up the company.
