= Kim Borg =

Finnish opera singer

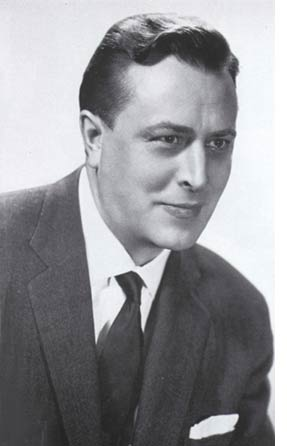
Kim Borg in 1965

Kim Borg (August 7, 1919 – April 28, 2000) was a Finnish bass, teacher and composer. He had a wide-ranging, resonant, warm voice.

== Biography ==
Kim Borg was born in Helsinki. He studied voice with Heikki Teittinen at the Sibelius Academy (1936–1941 and 1945–1947), where he also received training in theory and composition with Leo Funtek and Aarre Merikanto, and then pursued vocal studies with Andrejewa de Skilondz in Stockholm (1950–1959). He also studied biochemistry at the Helsinki University of Technology, and received a diploma in 1946.

In 1947 he made his formal concert debut in Helsinki, and in 1951 his formal operatic debut in Århus as Colline in La bohème. In addition to his concert appearances, he sang regularly in opera in Helsinki and Copenhagen (1952–1970), Stockholm (1963–1975), and Hamburg (1964–1970). In October 1959 he made his Metropolitan Opera debut in New York City as Count Almaviva, remaining on its roster until 1962. In 1961 he appeared as Boris Godunov in Moscow.

He also had success in such roles as Osmin, Don Giovanni, King Marke, Hans Sachs, King Phillip II, Pimen, Gremin, Don Basilio and Arkel.

Recordings of him are available as Abner in Saul og David by Carl Nielsen, Shigolch in Lulu, Shchelkalov in Boris Godunov, the Messenger in Orff's "Antigonae", and both Sarastro, the Sprecher and the Second Armed Man in The Magic Flute; also doing bass solos in Mozart's Requiem, Beethoven's Missa Solemnis, Verdi's Requiem, Elgar's The Dream of Gerontius, Rossini's Stabat Mater, Dvořák's Stabat Mater, and Haydn's The Creation. He also left a fine recording of Mussorsky's Songs and Dances of Death.

In 1962 he received the Pro Finlandia Medal of the Order of the Lion of Finland.

He retired from the stage in 1980. From 1972 to 1989 he was a professor at the Royal Danish Conservatory of Music in Copenhagen. He published several books, wrote orchestral compositions (Trombone Concerto, two symphonies), chamber music, a Stabat Mater, and songs. He also prepared orchestrations to compositions of Mussorgsky and Hugo Wolf.

He died in Humlebæk, Denmark in April 2000, aged 80. He is buried in the Hietaniemi Cemetery in Helsinki.

== Discography ==
- Kim Borg, Bass. DGG LPE 17093 (1957).
- Kim Borg: The Golden Years 1952–1956. Fuga 9220 (2008).
- Kim Borg: The Opera Album. Fuga 9270 (2010).
- Kim Borg: Immortal Recordings 1952–1954. Finlandia Classics FINCLA 4 (2013).
- Hartaita lauluja. Finlandia Classics FINCLA 5 (2013).
