= Eva Prytz =

Norwegian opera soprano

Eva Prytz (20 April 1917 – 16 December 1987) was a Norwegian opera soprano.

She was born in Oslo, but took her education in Stockholm, studying under Andrejewa de Skilondz. She was employed by the Royal Swedish Theatre from 1946 to 1967 and also held concerts in Oslo and several other European cities. She received several decorations, including the Order of Vasa and the St. Olav's Medal.
