= Eva Gustavson =

Norwegian opera singer

- Eva Gustavson and Richard Tucker, 1949
- Born: February 18, 1917; Horten, Norway
- Died: February 10, 2009 (aged 91); San Pedro, Los Angeles, US
- Occupations: Singer; Musician

Eva Gustavson (18 February 1917 – 10 February 2009), sometimes known as Eva Gustafson, was a Norwegian-American contralto who had an active international performance career in operas and concerts during the 1940s and 1950s. She later embarked on a second career as a voice teacher in the United States, notably teaching for many years on the music faculty of the University of Southern California.

== Background ==
Eva Gustavson was born in Horten on the Oslo Fjord, in Norway. Her father, Oscar Gustavson, was a violinist-conductor at the National Theatre and later at Oslo Philharmonic Orchestra; her mother, Margit Gustavson (née Schwartz), played the piano and was an organist. Eva studied singing and dancing in her youth, becoming an accomplished tap-dancer, acrobat, and musician. She joined a traveling cabaret troupe in her late teens but was later advised to quit to pursue a career as an opera singer. She studied singing in Oslo with Bokken Lasson, Soffi Schønning and Signe Amundsen. During the early part of World War II, she entered the Royal Swedish Opera School in neutral Sweden on a scholarship where she studied under Adelaide von Skilondz. She was also mentored during this time by Kirsten Flagstad. She became separated from her family for the duration of much of the war, as they were stranded by the Occupation of Norway by Nazi Germany. After the War, Gustavson continued with further studies in Milan, Italy under the advice of Flagstad. She later studied the title role of Carmen in California with Vladimir Rosing.

== Career ==
Gustavson made her professional opera debut in Oslo in 1946. In 1947 she won first prize at the UNESCO international music competition in Paris. In 1947–1948 she was a principal contralto at the Opéra Royal de Wallonie and made several appearances at La Monnaie in Brussels, Belgium. She spent the next 15 years performing lead roles in major opera houses throughout Europe and North America. She became particularly associated with the title role in Georges Bizet's Carmen, a role she portrayed more than 300 times during her career in multiple languages. Her first portrayal of Carmen was in 1949 at the Royal Swedish Opera. Her other signature roles were Amneris in Giuseppe Verdi's Aida and Azucena in Verdi's Il trovatore. Although she appeared in operas and toured throughout Europe and North America, Gustavson spent much of her career performing with the Norwegian National Opera in Oslo.

== Immigration ==
In 1949 Gustavson immigrated to the United States. That same year she gave what is probably her best known performance, the role of Amneris in Arturo Toscanini's 1949 concert telecast and recording of Giuseppe Verdi's Aida with the NBC Symphony Orchestra, and Herva Nelli in the title role. Richard Tucker was Radames. In the mid-1950s she settled on the West Coast of the United States, raised a family, and continued to appear in concert, including a performance of Stravinsky’s Le Rossignol under the baton of the composer. Gustavson also taught on the voice faculty of the University of Southern California for seventeen years. In 1977 she was honored by the King of Norway with the Royal Norwegian Order of St. Olav. She published an autobiography entitled Shooting Star From Dovrehallen to Toscanini, and then San Pedro. Gustavson died in San Pedro, Los Angeles, California, at age 91.
