= Soffi Schønning =

Norwegian operatic soprano

Soffi Schønning (October 2, 1895 – September 9, 1994) was a Norwegian operatic soprano.

Schønning was born in Kabelvåg. She studied under Borghild Langaard in Christiania, and under Mme. Luisa Cappiani in London . She made her professional opera debut in 1924. In 1928 she joined the roster of artists at the Royal Swedish Opera in Stockholm where she made her debut as Gilda in Rigoletto under the baton of Armas Järnefelt. That same year she also sang Gilda for her debut at the Royal Opera House in London, where she subsequently appeared in 1932–1933. She also sang several times at the Glyndebourne Festival Opera, with her first appearance there being in 1935. In 1938 she made her debut at the National Theatre in Oslo as Olympia in The Tales of Hoffmann. In 1940, she created the role of Ingeborg in the world premiere of Arne Eggen's Olav Liljekrans at the National Theatre. That same year, she sang Musetta in La boheme at the Det Nye Teater. A specialist in the coloratura soprano repertoire, some of the other roles she performed on stage included Konstanze in Die Entführung aus dem Serail, Philine in Mignon, the Queen of the Night in The Magic Flute, and the title role in Lakmé.

During the Second World War, Schønning appeared in London in an extensive series of concerts with Waldemar Johnsen. Together they gave more than a hundred performances of Norwegian music. During this time she married the editor Jonas Schanche Jonasen. The couple later settled in Sandnes, and Schønning taught out of a studio on nearby Stavanger until her retirement from teaching at the age of 80. Her most notable pupil was contralto Eva Gustavson. She died in Sandnes in 1994 at the age of 98.
