= Klaus Schønning =

Danish musician

Klaus Schønning (born 1954) is a Danish musician, known as a pioneer in the new-age genre.

Schønning was born in Copenhagen in 1954 and began composing music as a child. He studied music at the University of Copenhagen. His work is notable for its deft orchestration and a wide variety of featured instruments, including harp, zither, dulcimer, bouzouki, glockenspiel, and guitars. Klaus Schønning was also one of the first musicians to release his music independently. In the late seventies not many labels understood this new genre and hence they were reluctant to sign the then unknown composer. Instead of accepting the rejections, Klaus Schønning released his two first albums himself, and distributed them by bike to the Copenhagen record shops. Later he was signed to major labels such as Sony Music.

== Discography ==
=== Studio albums ===
- Lydglimt (1979)
- Cyclus (1980)
- Nasavu (1982)
- Locrian Arabesque (1985)
- Arctic Light (1987)
- Symphodyssé (1988)
- Symphodyssé II (1989)
- Symphodyssé III (1990)
- Symphodyssé IV (1992)
- Magic Café (1993)
- Endless Corridor (1995)
- Copenhagen (1996)
- Rune Quest (1997)
- Mysteries Of The Past (1998)
- Stars In The Night (2000)
- Invisible Worlds (2002)
- Fairytales (2005)
- Flow (2009)
- Spirit Of Sports (2010)
- Sacred Moments (2011)
- City (2012)
- Sanctum (2014)
- Papua New Guinea (soundtrack) (2014)

=== Wellness series ===
- Symphonies of Wellness (2006)
- Melodies of Wellness (2007)
- Harmonies of Wellness (2008)
- Christmas & Wellness (2008)

=== Recordings with the Band The North ===
- The North (1999)
- The Full Moon Concert (2000)
- Illusions (2013)
