= Lorentzen, Bas-Rhin =

Lorentzen Loränze
- Commune
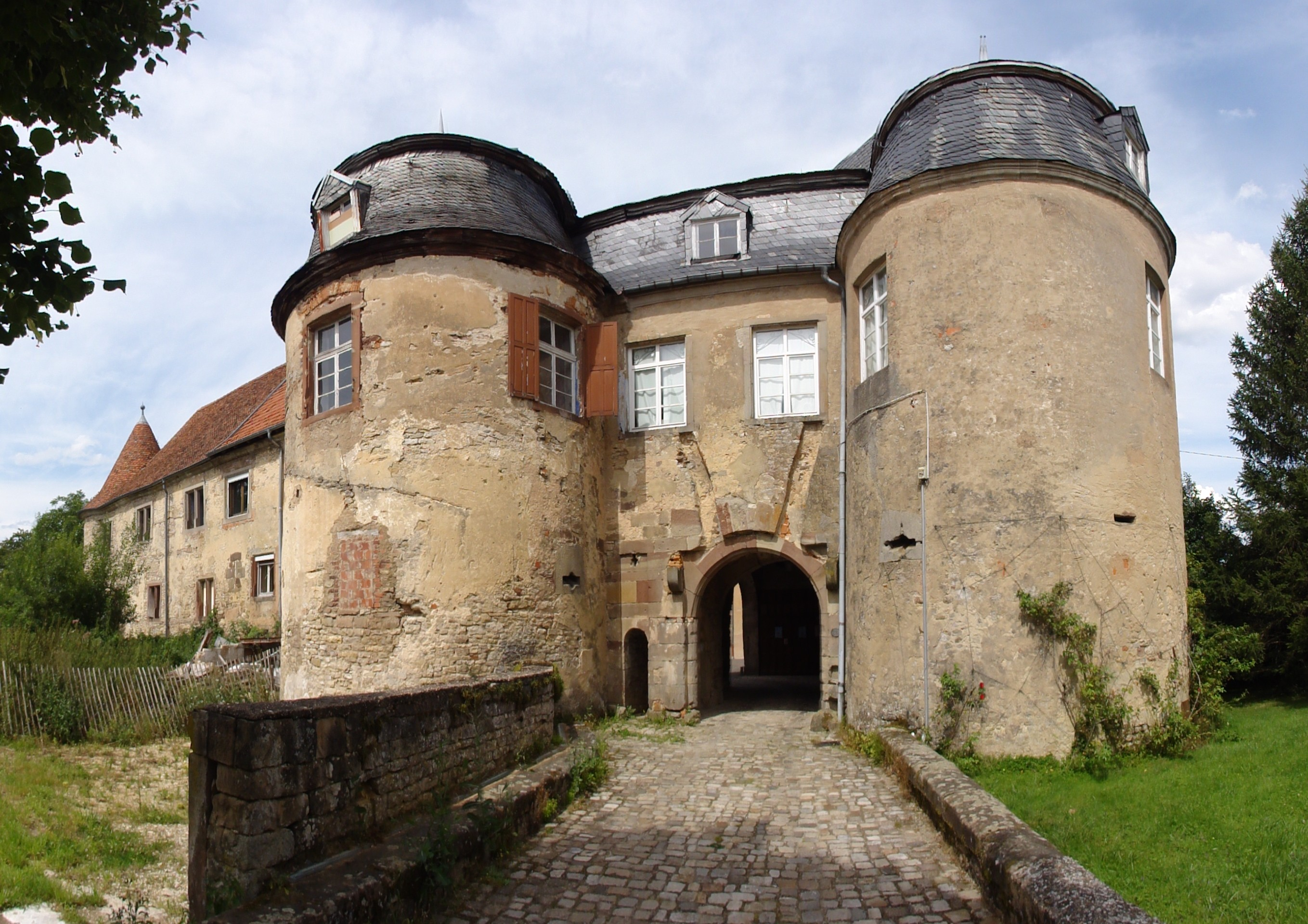
- The chateau in Lorentzen

- Coat of arms
- Location of Lorentzen
- Location within France Location within Grand Est
- Coordinates: 48°57′12″N 7°10′32″E
- Country: France
- Region: Grand Est
- Department: Bas-Rhin
- Arrondissement: Saverne
- Canton: Ingwiller

Government
  - Mayor (2020–2026): Dany Heckel
- Area^{1}: 7.85 km^{2} (3.03 sq mi)
- Highest elevation: 331 m (1,086 ft)
- Lowest elevation: 220 m (720 ft)
- Population (2023): 230
  - Density: 29/km^{2} (76/sq mi)
- Time zone: UTC+01:00 (CET)
  - Summer (DST): UTC+02:00 (CEST)
- INSEE/Postal code: 67274 /67430
- ^{1} French Land Register data, which excludes lakes, ponds, glaciers > 1 km^{2} (0.386 sq mi or 247 acres) and river estuaries.

Lorentzen (French pronunciation: [loʁɛntsən]; German: Lorenzen) is a commune in the Bas-Rhin department in Grand Est in north-eastern France.

== See also ==
- Communes of the Bas-Rhin department
- Château de Lorentzen
