= Château de Lorentzen =

Castle in France

Coordinates: 48.9532°N 7.1768°E

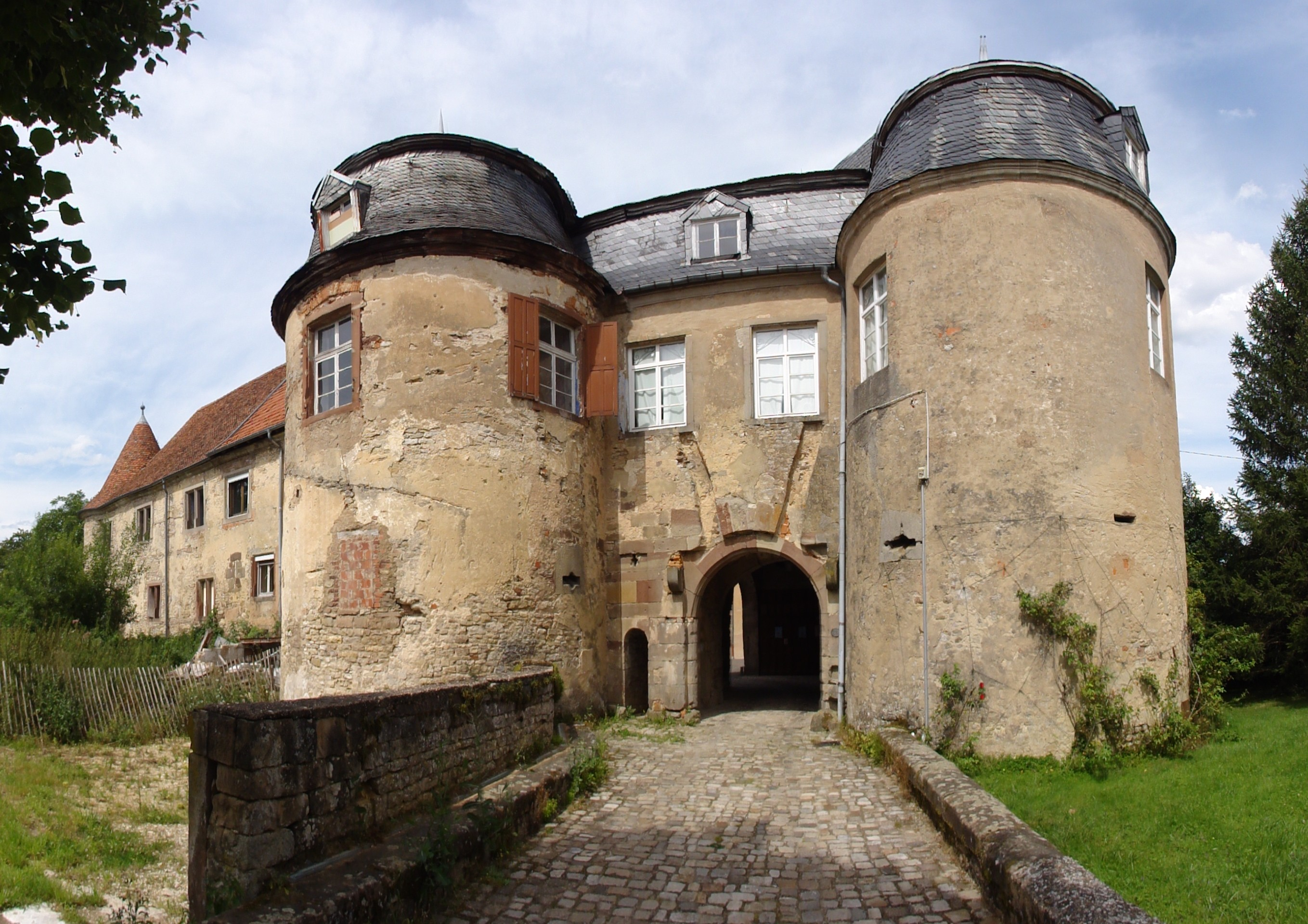
Site castral de Lorentzen

Château de Lorentzen is a castle in the commune of Lorentzen, in the department of Bas-Rhin, Alsace, France, which dates from the Middle Ages .

It is a listed historical monument since 1990.
