= Jo Strømgren =

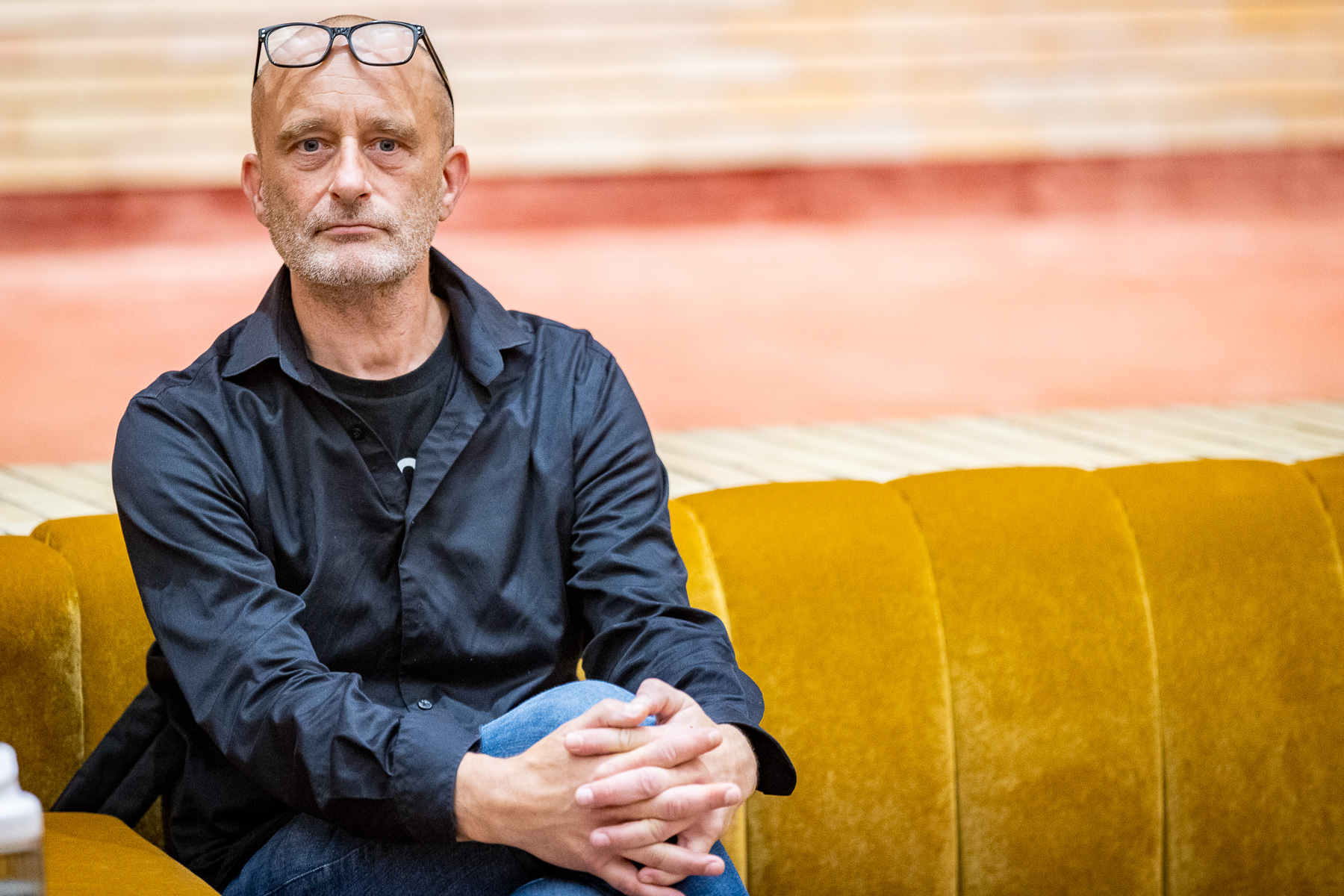
Jo Strømgren in 2023

Jo Strømgren (born 1970 in Norway), was educated in classical ballet and had some years as a dancer before an injury made him pursue a multi-disciplinary creative career.

As the artistic director of Jo Strømgren Kompani, a theatre company specializing in nonsensical languages, he has surprised audiences and critics worldwide with his peculiar style. The company has performed its mix of gibberish, live music, film, and puppet theatre in over 60 countries so far and has achieved numerous prizes.

He is also frequently commissioned with companies like Cedar Lake Contemporary Ballet, Danish Dance Theatre, Carte Blanche Dance Company, Cloud Gate Ensemble, Bern Ballet, Bielefeld Tanztheater, and many others. As a theatre director, he specializes in the plays of Henrik Ibsen and as playwright he has had about 10 plays produced at different state theatres in Norway. In 2003, Strømgren he directed his first feature film "Destination Moscow", which was played in cinemas in Norway and on several festivals abroad.
