= Indra Lorentzen =

Norwegian dancer and choreographer

- Born: 17 August 1956; Stockholm, Sweden
- Occupations: Choreographer, dancer
- Years active: 1972–present

Indra Lorentzen (born 17 August 1956 in Stockholm, Sweden) is a Norwegian dancer and choreographer with family roots on the mother's side, in Indonesia.

== Biography ==
Lorentzen started dancing at four years old in Stockholm. She studied dancing at the Opera Ballet School in Oslo, and became a member of the ballet ensemble of the Norwegian National Ballet in 1973, soloist in 1977. With her background as a half Indonesian, half Norwegian, she is in contact with a different culture of human relations also through body gestures.

She debuted as a choreographer for the Norwegian National Ballet in 1998 with the Sami-inspired Flettede stier, and has since choreographed several productions in Sweden, Norway and Greenland, including Peer Gynt and A Midsummer Night's Dream, and also dance films like Skårungen and the Radioballetten.

Lorentzen performed various roles in the Opera Ballet. She received the Critics prize for the title role in Månerenen by Birgit Cullberg (1981). In Volven (1989) by Kjersti Alveberg, a piece based on Norse creation myths, she performed the central role. She also performed the role of the mother in the drama Tango (1987) and the figure Miranda in The Tempest (1980). Her final performance with the Opera Ballet in 1997 was Tango.

== Honours ==
- Kritikerprisen (Norwegian Dance Critics Award) 1981, for the title role in Månerenen by Birgit Cullberg
