= Svein Tindberg =

Norwegian actor

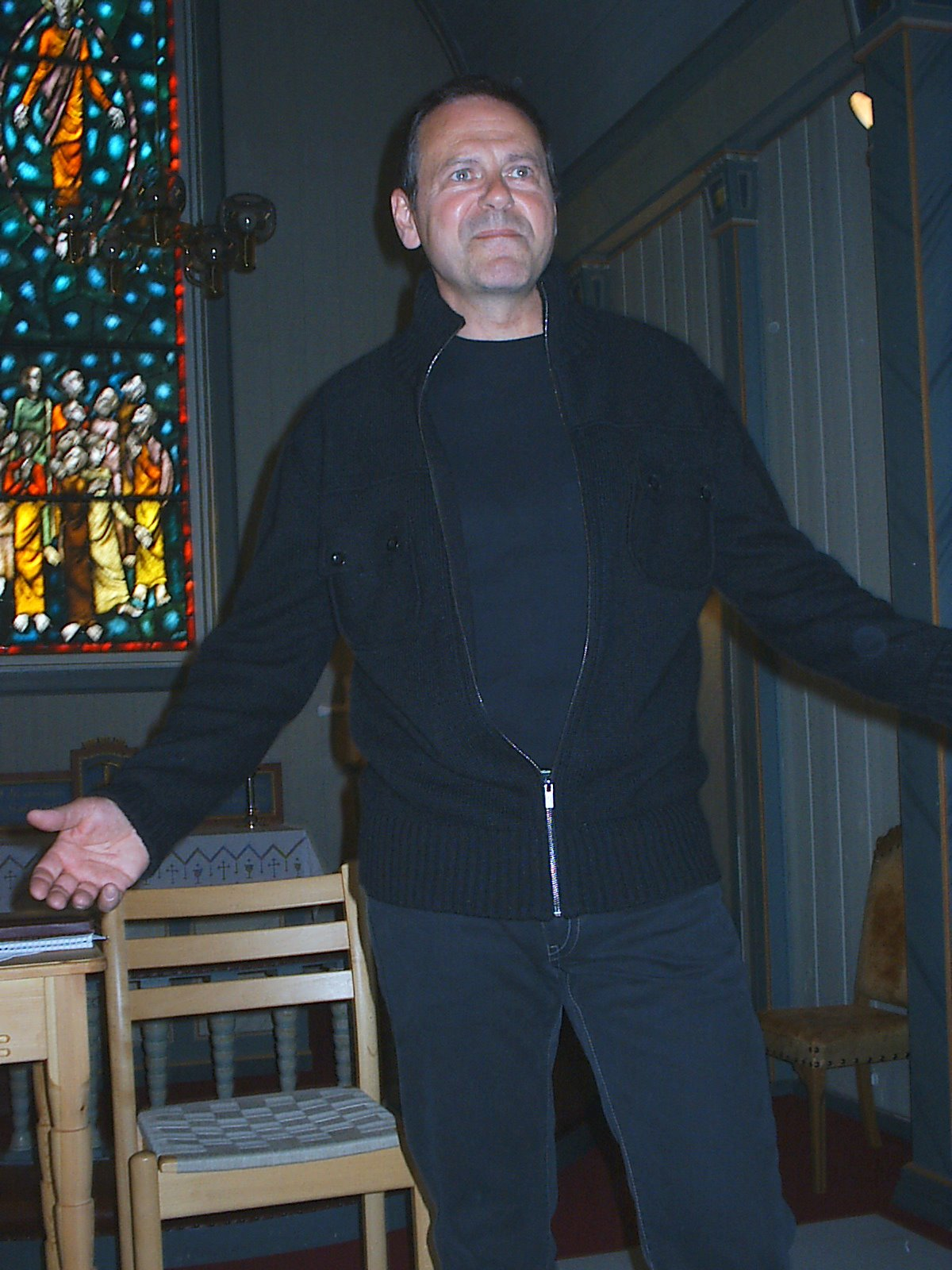
- Born: 25 June 1953 (age 71); Oslo, Norway
- Occupation: Actor

Svein Randor Tindberg (born 25 June 1953) is a Norwegian actor. He was born in Oslo; the son of Snorre Tindberg and Inger Mogstad. He made his stage debut 13 years old at Det Norske Teatret in 1966, in the musical The King and I. As an actor, he has worked for Fjernsynsteatret, Det Norske Teatret, Trøndelag Teater and Nationaltheatret. His film debut was in Rallarblod from 1979. His one-man performances with texts based on The Bible became very popular. His prizes include Teaterkritikerprisen, the Telenor Culture Award in 1995, Bibelprisen in 1996 and Brobyggerprisen in 2001.
