= Knut Skram =

Norwegian baritone (born 1937)

Knut Skram (born 18 December 1937) is a Norwegian baritone. Considered one of the most important Norwegian opera singers of his generation, his career has spanned more than four decades.

== Life and career ==
Born in the village of Sæbø in western Norway, Skram was one of the six children of Kari Totland and Asbjørn Skram, a pastor. When he was 19, he went to the United States to work on his uncle's ranch in Montana for a year. He then trained as an architect at Montana State University and concurrently studied singing there with the lyric baritone George Buckbee. In the summer before his final year at university he sang with Chautauqua Opera Company and a few months later won the Spokane district Metropolitan Opera Auditions for the second time. After a brief stint working as an architect in New York City, he returned to Norway to pursue his singing career. In 1964, following further singing study with Paul Lohmann in Wiesbaden and Luigi Ricci in Rome, he made his official stage debut as Amonasro in Aida at the Norwegian National Opera. He went on to sing a wide range of baritone roles both internationally and in his native country where he was member of the Norwegian National Opera for 36 years.

Skram's international appearances have included Spoleto Festival USA where he sang Amfortas in a production of Parsifal directed by Gian Carlo Menotti (1990) and Orestes in Elecktra (1992); Glyndebourne Festival Opera where he appeared for nine seasons, most notably as Guglielmo in Così fan tutte and Figaro in The Marriage of Figaro; and the Berlin State Opera where he sang several Wagnerian roles. He has also appeared at London's Royal Albert Hall, the Opéra-Comique in Paris, Arena di Verona, La Monnaie in Brussels, and the Aix-en-Provence Festival. Skram officially retired from the Norwegian National Opera in 2000 with a farewell performance as Baron Scarpia in Tosca. However, he has continued to perform occasionally both in concerts and on the opera stage. In May 2011 more than forty years after his debut, he sang the role of Creon in Stravinsky's opera-oratorio Oedipus Rex at the Bergen International Festival.

In 1984 Skram was awarded Norway's Knight of the Order of St. Olav and in 2001 the Anders Jahres Kulturpris for outstanding contribution to Norwegian culture. He was Chairman of the Norwegian Opera Singer Association from 1979 to 1983 and served on the board of directors of the Norwegian National Opera from 2001 to 2008. He was a member of the jury which selected the design for the new Oslo Opera House and participated in the opening concerts in April 2008. Skram has been married to the dancer Hanne (Thorstensen) Skram since 1966.

== Recordings ==
In 2008, the Norwegian record company Simax issued a CD of Skram's live concert recordings spanning a 25-year period of his career, Knut Skram - Concert Recordings (Simax PSC 1804), which includes opera arias as well as a complete performance of Robert Schumann's song cycle Dichterliebe with pianist Robert Levin. Skram can also be heard on:

- Grieg: Complete Songs – Knut Skram, Christa Pfeiler, Kjell Magnus Sandve, Marianne Hirsti, pianist Rudolf Jansen. Label: Brilliant Classics CD 93803
- Mozart: Le nozze di Figaro – Kiri Te Kanawa (Countess Almaviva), Benjamin Luxon (Count Almaviva), Ileana Cotrubas (Susanna), Knut Skram (Figaro), Frederica Von Stade (Cherubino); The London Philharmonic Orchestra, John Pritchard (conductor). Filmed live at the 1973 Glyndebourne Festival. Label: Arthaus Musik DVD 101089
- Strauss: Der Krämerspiegel, Op. 66 – Knut Skram (baritone), Eva Knardahl (piano). Label: Bis CD 49
