= Norwegian National Academy of Ballet =

Former ballet school in Oslo, Norway

Coordinates: 59°55′31″N 10°45′17″E

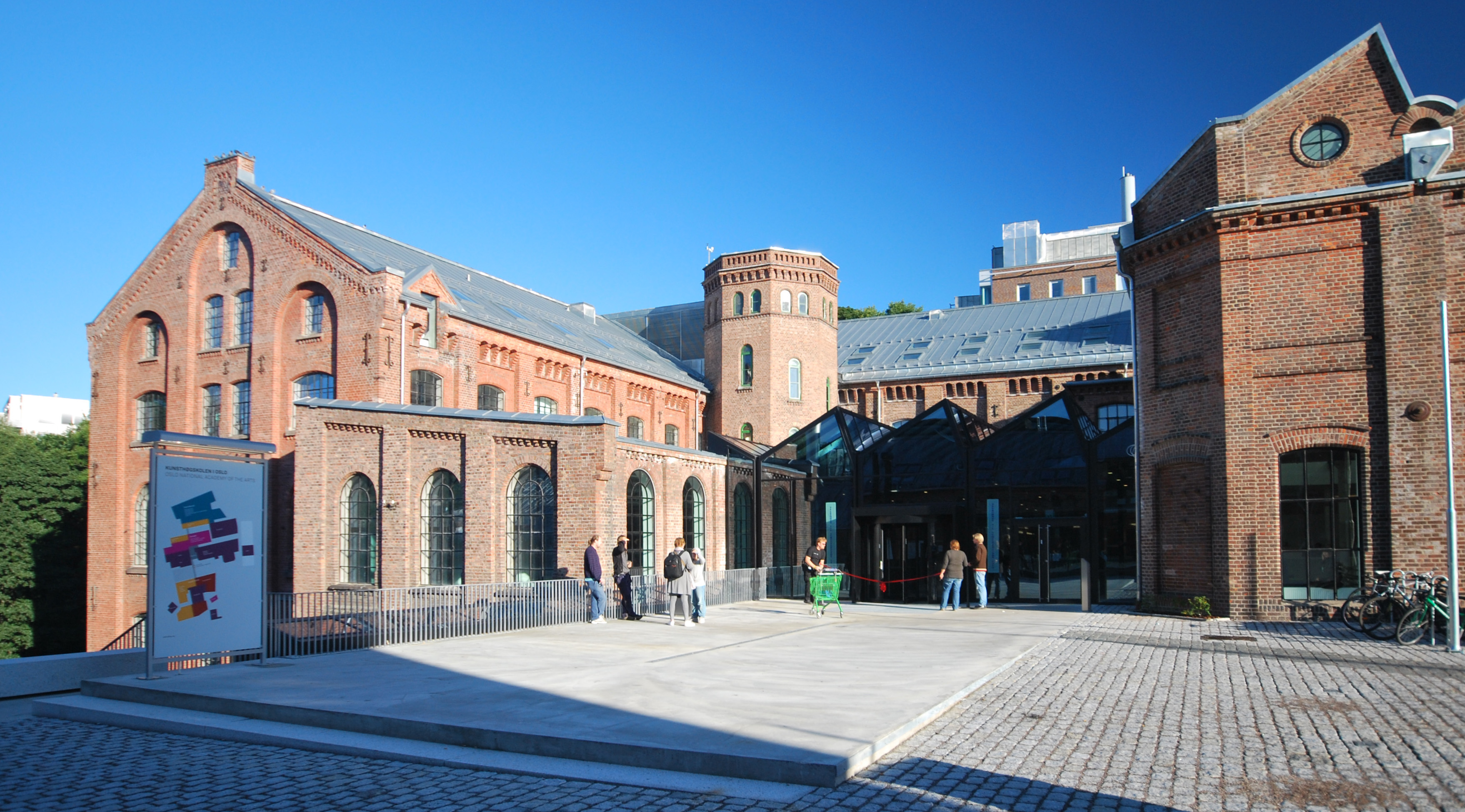
Kunsthogskolen Oslo entrance

The Norwegian National Academy of Ballet (Norwegian: Statens balletthøgskole) was a ballet school in Oslo, Norway from 1979 until 1996.
