= List of theatres in Norway =

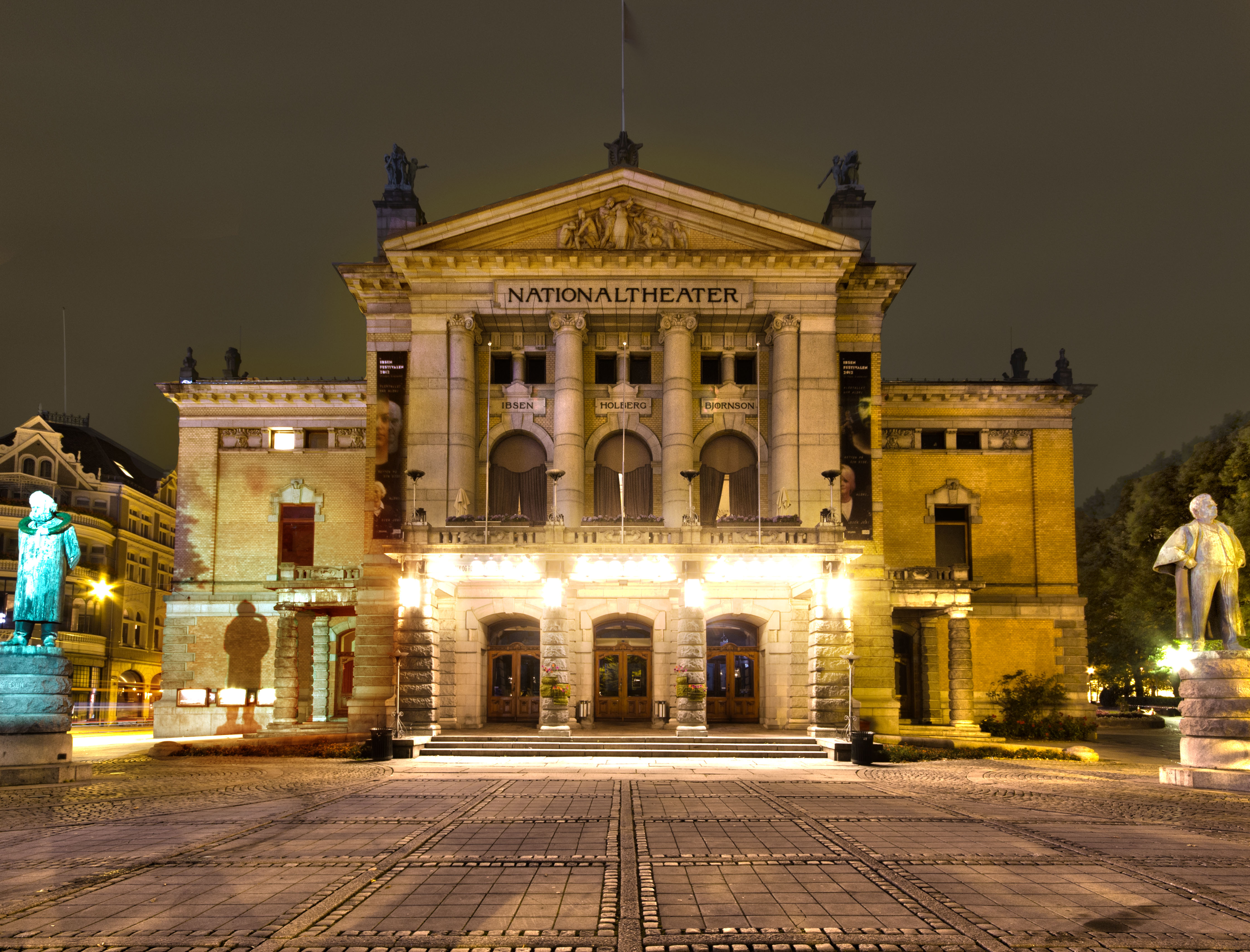
Nationaltheatret Oslo at night

This is a list of professional and semi-professional theaters in Norway.

- Agder Teater, Kristiansand
- Beaivvas Sami Teater, Kautokeino
- BIT Teatergarasjen
- Black Box Teater, Oslo
- Brageteatret
- Carte Blanche Danseteater
- Den Nationale Scene in Bergen
- Det Norske Teatret, Oslo
- Grenland Friteater, Skien
- Haugesund Teater, Haugesund
- Hedmark Teater, Hamar
- Det Vestnorske Teateret, Bergen
- Hålogaland Teater, Tromsø
- Nationaltheateret (The National Theatre), Oslo
- Nordland Teater, Mo i Rana
- Oslo Nye Teater, Oslo
- Riksteatret, based in Oslo, touring all over the country
- Rogaland Teater, Stavanger
- Stella Polaris, Sandefjord
- Teater Ibsen, Skien
- Teater Vestland, Førde
- Teatret Vårt, Molde
- Teaterhuset Avant Garden, Trondheim
- Trøndelag Teater, Trondheim
