= Nils Johnson =

Norwegian actor and theatre director

- Born: Nils Johnson; June 19, 1956 (age 69); Tønsberg, Norway
- Occupations: Actor; Theatre director
- Years active: 1980–present

Nils Johnson (born 19 June 1956) is a Norwegian actor and theatre director.

== Early life ==
He was born in Tønsberg, and is a brother of Guri Johnson.

== Theatre career ==
He made his stage debut in 1980 at Nordland Teater, and then worked at Hålogaland Teater from 1981 to 1989 and Trøndelag Teater from 1989 to 2000. From 2001 to 2008 he was the director of Hålogaland Teater.

== Movie career ==
Johnson portrayed also Jon in Cold Prey 3 under the direction from Mikkel Brænne Sandemose.

Cultural offices
Preceded by Haukur Jón Gunnarsson	Director of Hålogaland Teater; 2001–2008	Succeeded by Iren Reppen
