= Hotten =

Hotten could refer to:

- Hotten, a fictional town in the British soap opera Emmerdale
- John Camden Hotten (1832–1873), Victorian pornographer, publisher, lexicographer
- Jon Hotten (1965), English author and journalist.

== See also ==
- 1732 Høtten, a 1998 Norwegian thriller film
