= Reppen =

Reppen may refer to:

- Iren Reppen (born 1965), Norwegian actress
- Reppen, German exonym for Rzepin, Poland
