= Reidar Sørensen =

Norwegian actor

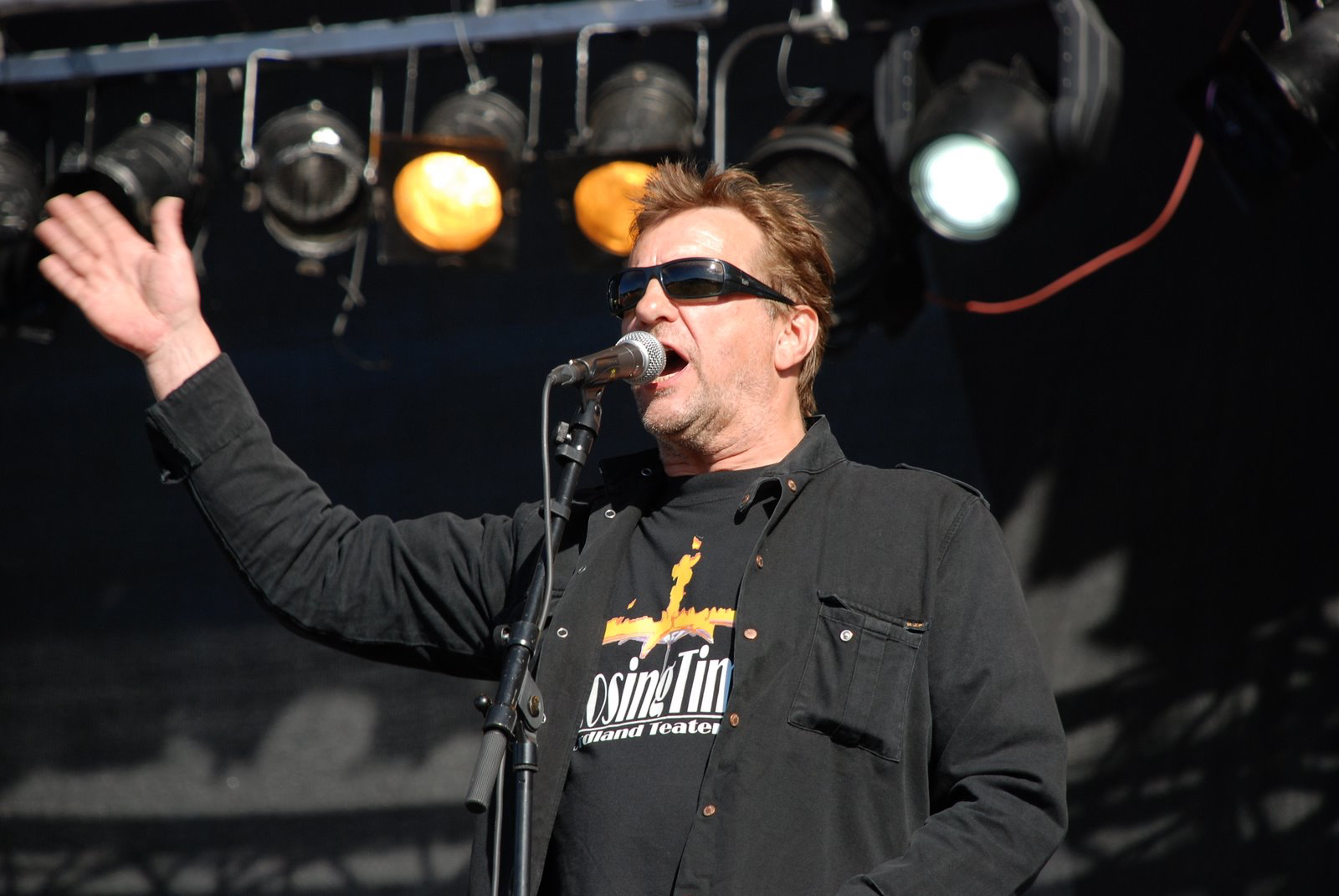
- Sørensen in 2008
- Born: 11 April 1956 (age 69); Hemnesberget
- Occupation: Actor
- Awards: Amanda Award (1989)

Reidar Sørensen (born 11 April 1956) is a Norwegian actor. He was born in Hemnesberget. He has worked at various theatres, including Trøndelag Teater, Det Norske Teatret, Riksteatret, Nordland Teater and Agder Teater. He was given the Amanda Award in 1989 for Himmelplaneten. He played the detective "Cato Isaksen" in several TV crime series based on novels by Unni Lindell. He has played in several drama films, including Byttinger from 1991, Ti kniver i hjertet from 1995, Brent av frost from 1997, and 1732 Høtten from 1998. He played the character "Gaston" in Torun Lian's film for young adults Ikke naken in 2004, and "Viktor" in Gunnar Vikene's film Trigger in 2006. He was assigned theatre director at Nordland Teater from 2008.

In 2010 he played the character "Jordan" in Bent Hamer's Home for Christmas.
