= Haukur Jón Gunnarsson =

Haukur Jón Gunnarsson (born 5 July 1949) is an Icelandic theatre instructor and director.

He is best known for his work in Norway, where he was director of the Beaivváš Sámi Theatre from 1991 to 1996, Hålogaland Teater from 1997 to 2000 and, again director of Beaivváš Sámi Theatre from 2007. He is also known for spreading Japanese theater, including Kabuki, in Norway, and has been awarded for this by UNESCO.

Cultural offices
Preceded by John Sigurd Kristensen	Director of Hålogaland Teater; 1997–2000	Succeeded by Nils Johnson
