= Bernhard Ramstad =

Norwegian actor, theatre instructor and director

Bernhard Ramstad (born 29 December 1946) is a Norwegian actor, theatre instructor and director.

He made his debut at Trøndelag Teater in 1966. He was formally employed there from 1968 to 1970, and then worked at Nationaltheatret from 1970 to 1971, Hålogaland Teater from 1971 to 1977 and Telemark Teater from 1977 to 1986. From 1986 to 1989 he was the director of Hålogaland Teater. In 1989 he was hired at Det Norske Teatret. He has also appeared on the screen. He chaired the Norwegian Actors' Equity Association from 1994 to 1999. Ramstad played the role of the storytelling grandfather in the 2013 Ylvis viral music video "The Fox (What Does the Fox Say?)", after first appearing on the 2011 season finale, "Mr. Saxobeat", of "I kveld med Ylvis" (Tonight with Ylvis").

Cultural offices
Preceded by position created	Director of Hålogaland Teater; 1986–1989	Succeeded by John Sigurd Kristensen
