= Iren Reppen =

Norwegian actress (born 1965)

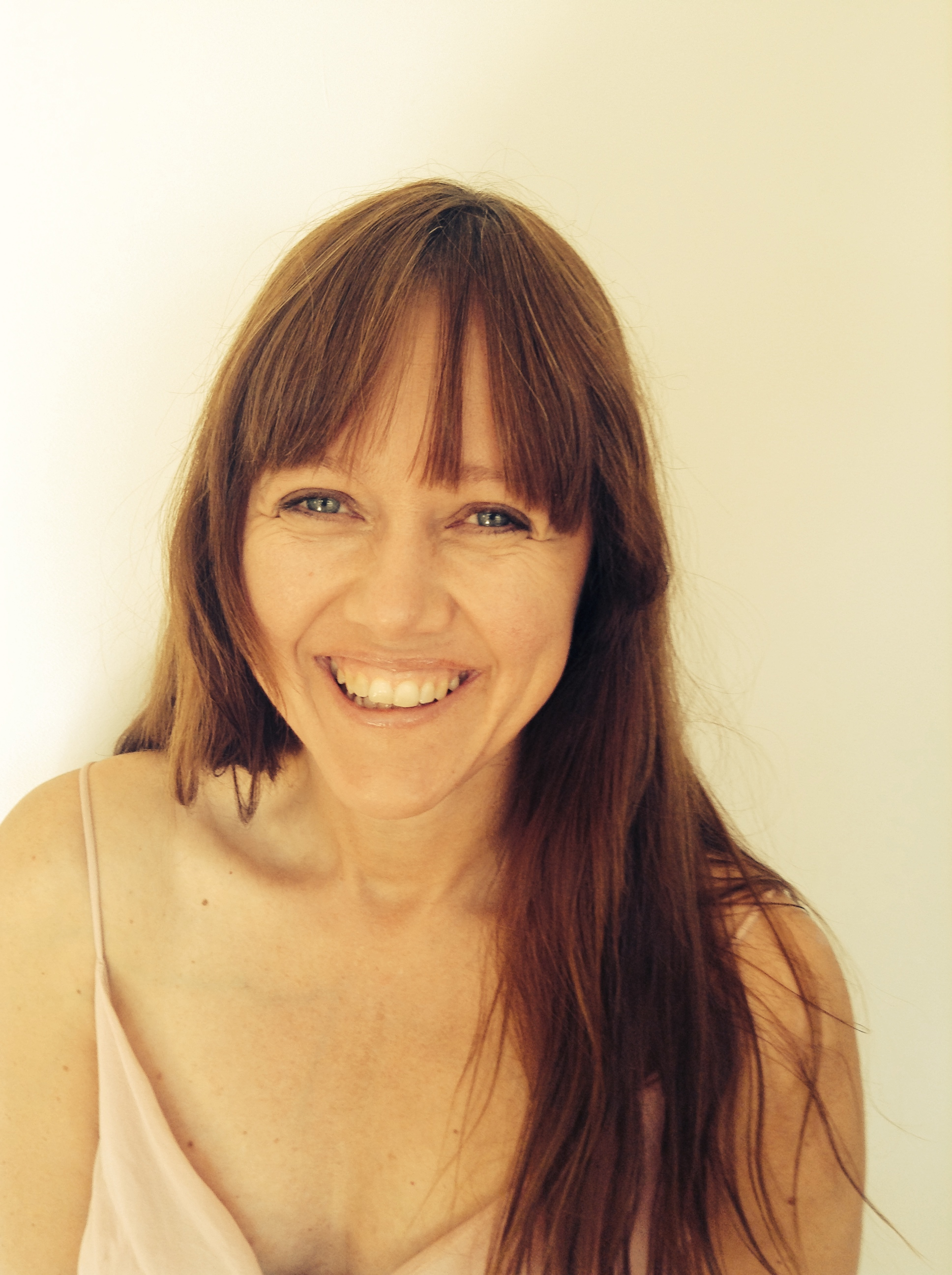
- Born: 19 December 1965 (age 60); Harstad
- Occupation: Actress
- Years active: 1990 – present

Iren Reppen (born 19 December 1965) is a Norwegian actress.

She graduated from Norwegian National Academy of Theatre in 1990. Her debut was in the play «Romeo and Juliet» ved Trøndelag Teater in 1990. She has since worked at Det Norske Teatret (the Norwegian Theater), and other theatres. Her best-known role is probably the cabaret "Det e' hardt å være mainn" (It's hard to be man) from 1994. She has also acted in film and television, in roles such as "Nini" in the television series by the same name in 2001, and in the movies Krigerens hjerte (1991) and For dagene er onde (1992). In 2007, she was made director of Hålogaland Teater in Tromsø, assuming office in 2009.

== Select filmography ==
- Krigerens hjerte (1991)
- For dagene er onde (1992)
- Olsenbanden Jr. og Sølvgruvens hemmelighet (2007)
- Der Letzte macht das Licht aus! als Anne (2007)
- Andre omgang (2007)
- Thomas P (2007)
- Opptur (2008)
- Himmelblå (2008)
- Mercy (2012)
- Flukt (2012)

Cultural offices
Preceded by Nils Johnson	Director of Hålogaland Teater; 2009–present	Incumbent
