= Cold Prey 3 =

- Poster of "Fritt vilt III"
- Directed by: Mikkel Brænne Sandemose
- Written by: Peder Fuglerud; Lars Gudmestad
- Produced by: Martin Sundland; Kristian Sinkerud
- Starring: Ida Marie Bakkerud; Kim S. Falck-Jørgensen; Nils Johnson
- Cinematography: Ari Willey
- Edited by: Wibecke Rønseth
- Music by: Magnus Beite
- Production company: Fantefilm
- Release date: 15 October 2010
- Running time: 95 minutes
- Country: Norway
- Language: Norwegian
- Budget: 17,100,000 NOK (estimated)
- Box office: $2.2 million

Cold Prey 3 (Norwegian: Fritt vilt III) is a 2010 Norwegian slasher film, it is the prequel to the highly successful Cold Prey (Fritt vilt), and Cold Prey 2 (Fritt vilt II). It was directed by Mikkel Brænne Sandemose and starred Nils Johnson in the leading role.

== Plot ==
The film opens with a flashback of a young boy, with a birthmark on his left eye, getting abused and locked up in a dark, messy room by his stepfather. Time passes, and the young boy was reported to be missing. Given that the weather is unforgiving in the mountains, the police thinks the boy, Geri Olav, would not survive the cold.

Sigrid, mother of Geri Olav, heard some noise in the hallway but did not find anything unusual when she investigated. When she drops her guard, Geri Olav appears before her. Sigrid embraces Geri Olav happy for his return only for her to be stabbed by Geri Olav. Geri Olav's stepfather, Gunnar, approaches their room only to find his wife dead. Geri Olav now behind Gunnar stabs him in the throat and walks away as if nothing happened

12 years later, a group of young friends take a trip into Jotunheimen National Park. They intend to hike into the area where an abandoned hotel sits in the mountains; it was the site of several disappearances, including a young boy who vanished into thin air. After opting to camp in the woods instead of staying at the old hotel, the friends soon discover there is a hulking killer in the woods, and he may not be alone.

In the middle of the night, Siri and Knut left the campsite for some alone time with each other. In the dark, they fell for a Pitfall trap. Wooden stakes pierce Knut, and Siri is relatively unharmed. While Siri left the pitfall to seek help, Knut was taken away by a man to a shed. In the shed, the man Disemboweled Knut.

Siri fell unconscious and is found by Jon. Unbeknownst to Siri, Jon drove her to the same shed as Knut. Jon entered the shed and belittled the man for killing Knut like an animal. Siri entered the shed after Jon left and found Knut corpse. Jon proceeded to drag Siri offscreen.

The next morning, their friends carried on with their trip. Magne is listening to music on his cassette player, while Simen brought a rifle and is itching to shoot. Simen encounters the Mountain man, is spooked by him, and fires a few rounds into him. The rounds did not stop him, and the man tackles Simen. Simen is then found dead by Hedda. Hedda, sensing danger, runs and regroups with Magne and Anders while running away from the Mountain Man. They proceed to hide in the basement of a house. Meanwhile, Siri is woken up by Einer knocking on the door looking for Jon, but her escape was interrupted by Jon forcing himself on her.

Realizing hiding is not a good plan, Anders, Magne and Hedda sneak out of the house only to be chased by the Mountain man to a river. Along the river Anders was shot by an arrow in the shoulder, and Magne in the foot, during the escape. Anders and Hedda are separated from Magne hiding in a cave, until Magne clumsily activated a car siren. Magne found Einer's jeep and is trying to use the satellite phone, but he accidentally activates the siren when he is trying to start the jeep to charge the phone. Hedda came and investigate only to find Magne caught by the Mountain man.

Siri, still held captive by Jon, is woken up by the Mountain man dragging and Exsanguination of Magne. Jon instructed Mountain man to clean up his mess by catching Hedda and Anders and leaving Siri to him. Anders and Hedda arrive at Jon's house, where Hedda knocks on the door and Anders rest in Jon's pickup. Hedda insists to Jon they need to call the police, but Jon only allows her inside. Inside, Hedda tries to call the police but the landline does not work. When Jon attempts to grab a shotgun, Hedda seizes it, holding him at gunpoint and calling Anders in. She gives Anders the shotgun before going to the basement, where she hears Siri's voice prompting her to unlock the door.

As they tries to leave the house, the killer enters and fatally stabbing Siri with a screwdriver. Jon took this opportunity to seized the shotgun from Anders and confronts the killer but is shot before completing his statement. Hedda and Anders flee into the basement as the killer shoots at them. They barricade themselves, and Anders escapes through the window only to be impaled by the killer with a crowbar.

Hedda grabs a Hoe and confronts the killer, hitting him and causing him to stumble. Hedda snatches the shotgun from Jon and reloads the weapon. When Einar enters, Hedda mistakenly aims at him, but Einar deescalates the confrontation. Just as the killer reappears behind Einer, Hedda takes aim at the Mountain man and Einer misunderstands Hedda's intention and shot her. Einar attempts to stop Hedda's bleeding, but it's futile. He carries the bodies of Hedda, Jon, and Siri outside as snow begins to fall. The killer returns to a dormant hotel.

== Cast ==
- Ida Marie Bakkerud as Hedda
- Kim S. Falck-Jørgensen as Anders
- Pål Stokka as Magne
- Julie Rusti as Siri
- Arthur Berning as Simen
- Sturla Rui as Knut
- Terje Ranes as Einar
- Nils Johnson as Jon
- Hallvard Holmen as Bjørn Brath
- Trine Wiggen as Magny Brath

== Production ==
Cold Prey 3 is a prequel to the first two films. It was completely shot in Jotunheimen, Norway.

== Release ==
The film premiered on 15 October 2010 in Norway.

== Reception ==
Cold Prey 3 was received negatively; only 16% of audience members sampled by Rotten Tomatoes reacted positively. Scott Weinberg of ChillerTV was critical of the third installment of the Cold Prey series, saying, "The goodwill of the solid original and its amusing sequel has been squandered by laziness."
