= Fjæreheia =

Theater in Norway

Coordinates: 58°22′39″N 8°35′30″E

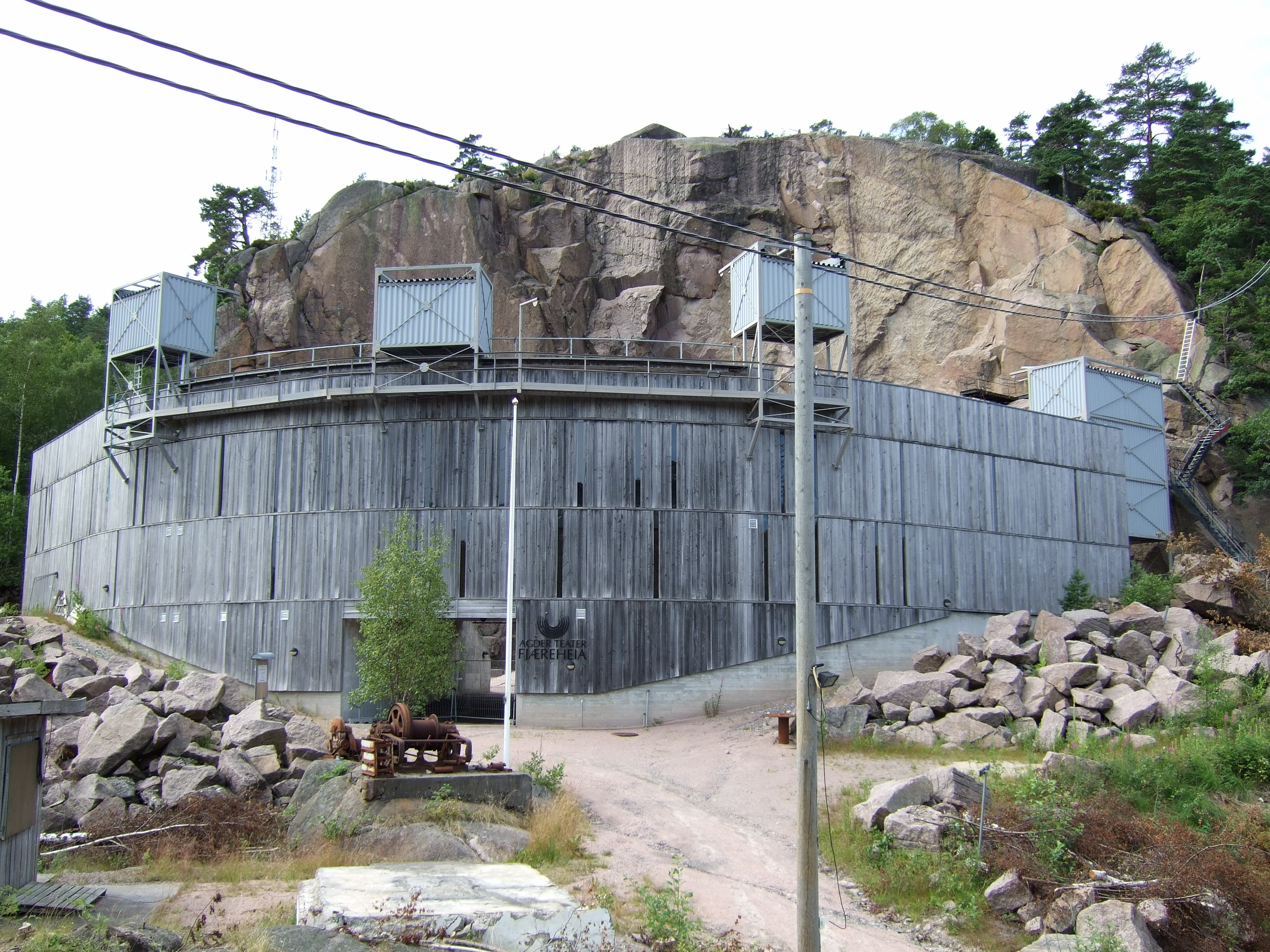
Agder teater, Fjæreheia. Theatre from outside

Fjæreheia is a former quarry in Norway known for its distinctive Alkali feldspar granite. Since 1993, it has been used as a theatre, hosting both Ibsen's plays and contemporary rock musicals.

Agder Theatre purchased the quarry in 1995 and, by the summer of 1999, had constructed a new 900-seat amphitheatre. Located about 2 kilometers from Fjære Church, the quarry offers an open-air venue with excellent acoustics.

Since opening in 1999 there have been many different types of arrangement at Fjæreheia. Diverse productions have been staged, including musicals such as Jesus Christ Superstar, film presentations, readings of the poem "Terje Vigen" and rock concerts from acts such as A-ha, Vamp and Bjørn Eidsvåg.

== Plays ==
Plays at Fjæreheia
Name	Year
Brand	2006
Emma	2005
Antigone	2004
Jesus Christ Superstar	2001/2002
Peer Gynt	1998/2000
Når vi døde vågner	1996
Catilina	1993/1994

== Upcoming events ==
- "Steinbrudduka" August 2013, a Nordic performing arts festival
