= Beaivváš Sámi Našunálateáhter =

Saami theatre in Norway

Coordinates: 69°1′9″N 23°3′35″E

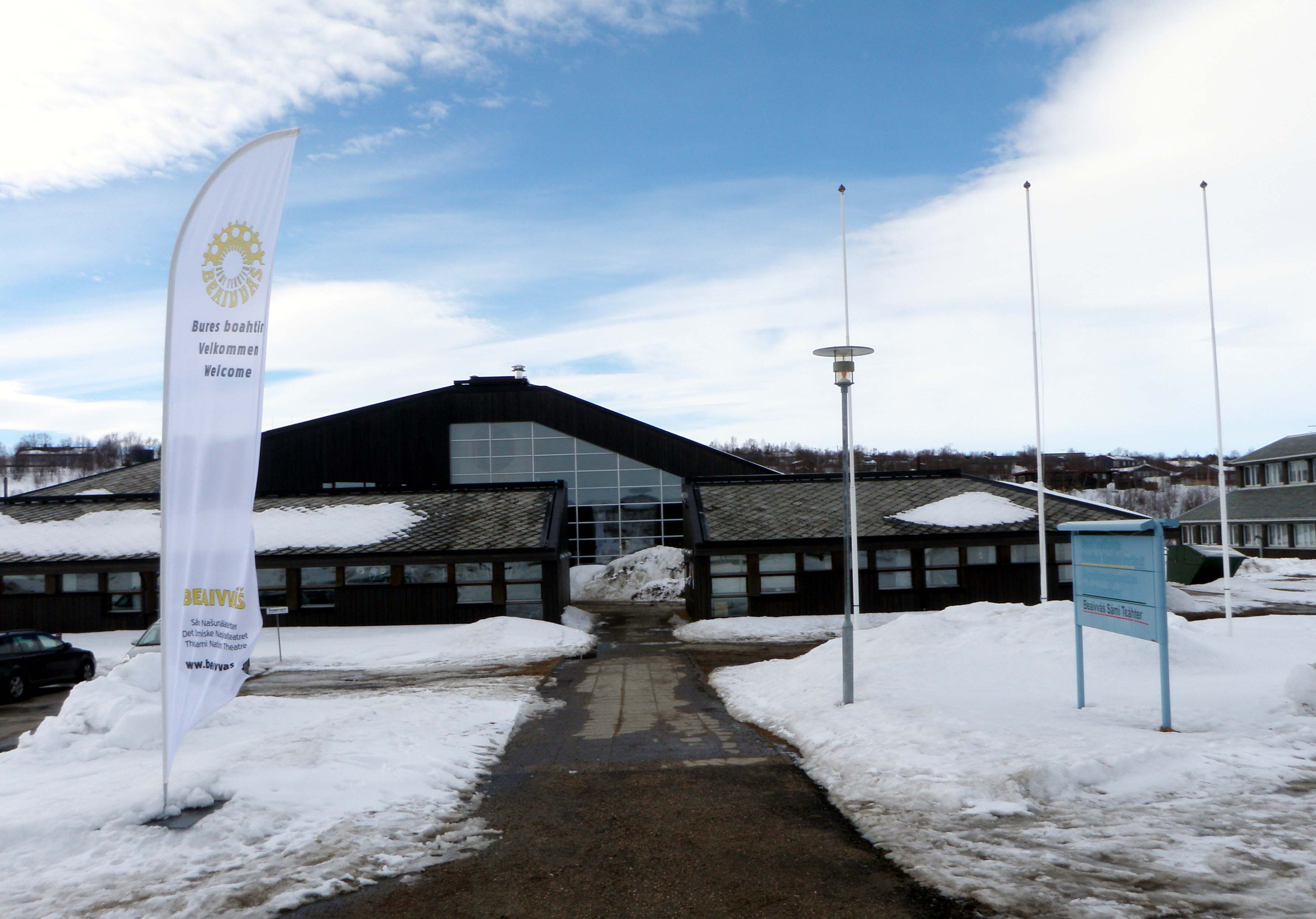
Beaivváš Sámi Theatre (2014)

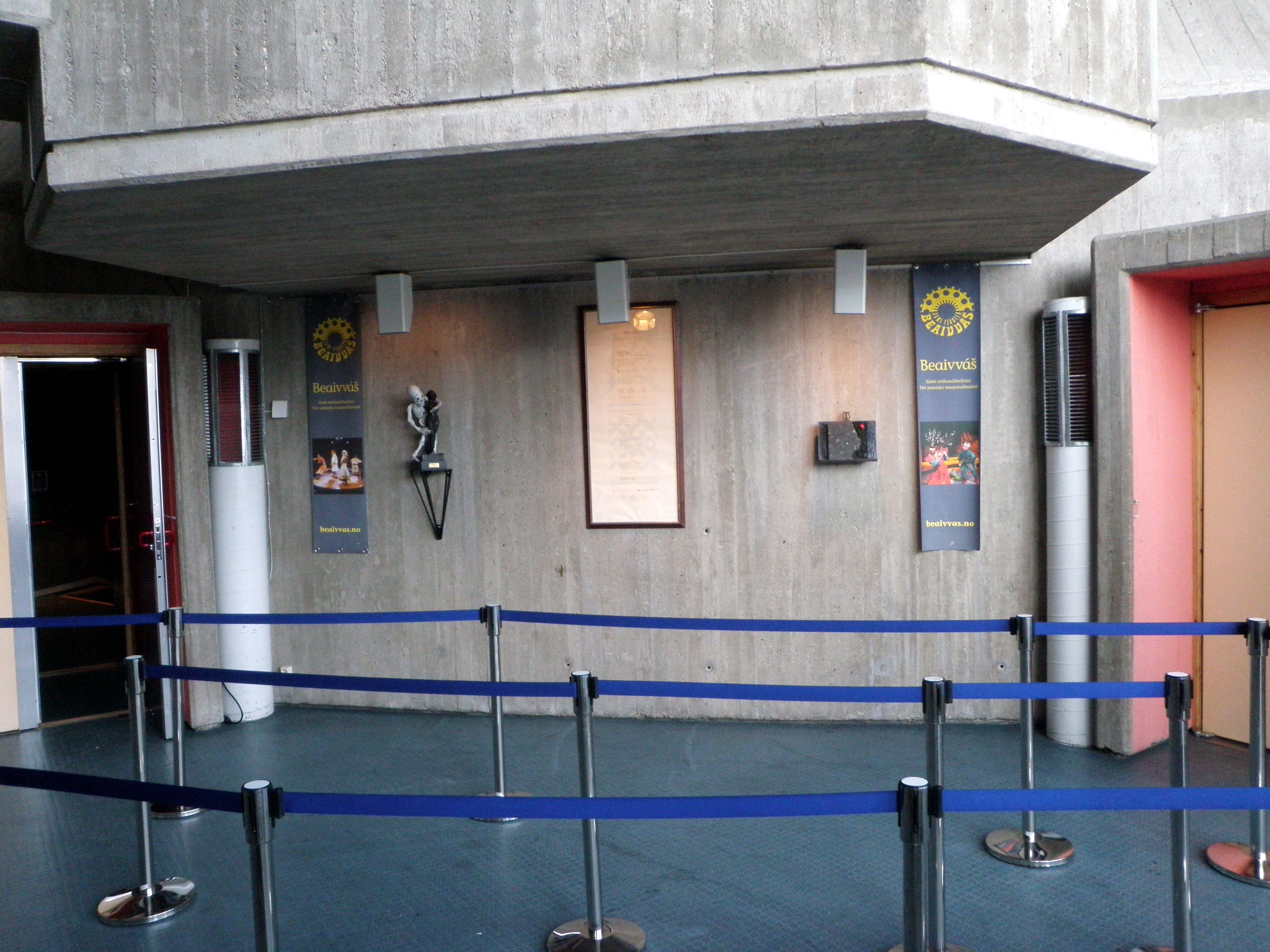
Entrance doors in the foyer at Beaivváš Sámi Theatre (2014)

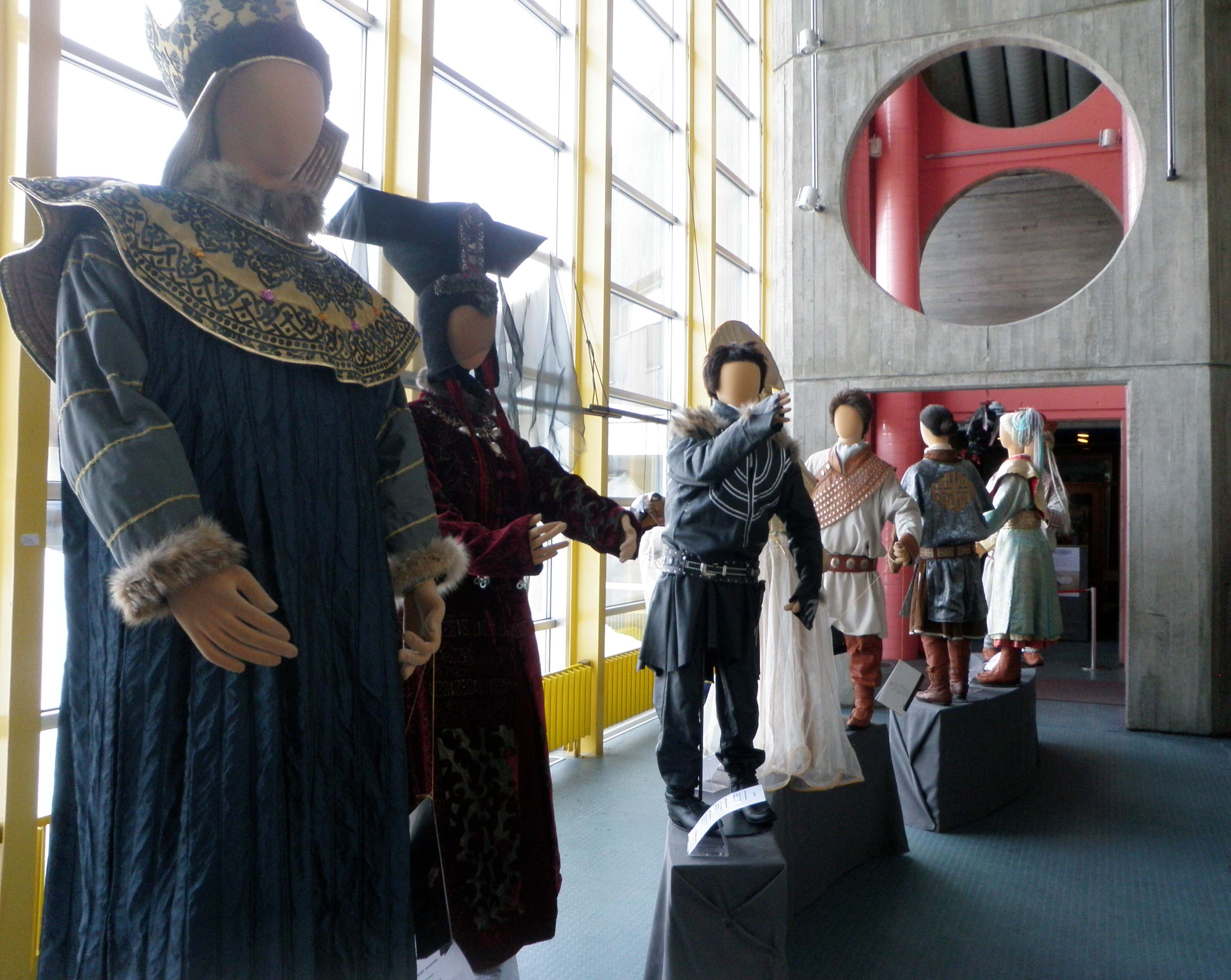
Costume exhibition at Beaivváš Sámi Theatre (2014)

Beaivváš Sámi Našunálateáhter (established in 1981 in Guovdageainnu Municipality) is a Norwegian theatre and theatre company that uses Sami language as its performing language. In addition, it is the only Sami-language theatre in the country. The theatre's official aim is "to form and activate our own cultural sources, to inspire, renew, motivate, to broaden and to bring forward the Sami culture, as well as to create kinship and understanding between different cultures."

Beaivváš started as an independent theatre group in 1981, but since 1991 has been supported by the Norwegian government, and since 2002 by the Sami Parliament. It has cooperated artistically and educationally with the Sámi University College, the theater college in Luleå, Music in Finnmark, the Sami Theater in Kiruna, Åarjelhsaemien Teatere in Mo i Rana and Tärnaby, along with Hålogaland Teater. In 2005, they toured Scandinavia with the production Skuolfi. The theatre employs four actors, two technicians and four administrative employees.

There are plans in place to relocate the theatre from the Kautokeino Cultural Center to a new building.

== Managers ==
- 1991–1996 Haukur J. Gunnarsson
- 1997–2002 Alex Scherpf
- 2002–2006 Harriet Nordlund
- 2007–2015 Haukur J. Gunnarsson
- 2016–2023 Rolf Degerlund
- 2023– Per Ananiassen
