= Grenland Friteater =

Theatre in Porsgrunn, Norway

Coordinates: 59.1373°N 9.6430°E

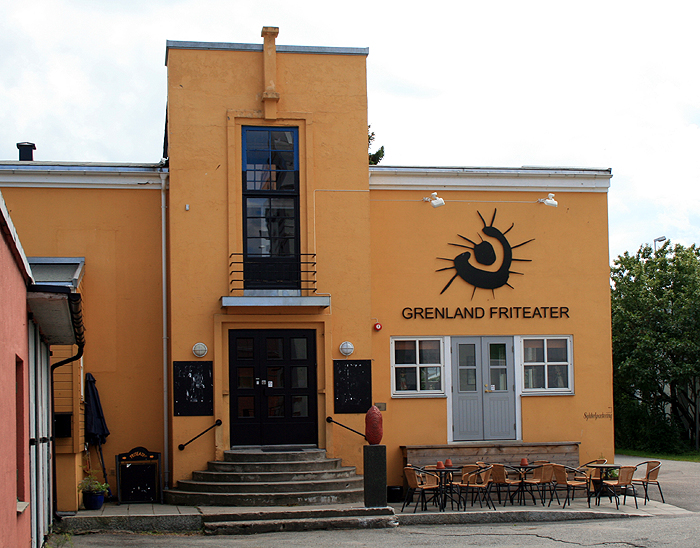

Grenland Friteater is one of the oldest independent theatres in Norway, based in the small industrial town Porsgrunn. Every year in June, Grenland Friteater organises the Porsgrunn International Theatre Festival.

== Startup and members ==
Grenland Friteater was founded in 1976 by Trond Hannemyr, Lars Steinar Sørbø, Lars Vik and Tor Arne Ursin. Lars Steinar Sørbø was the first Norwegian actor from an independent theatre to become part of a national theatre, Den Nationale Scene in Bergen. Trond Hannemyr, Lars Vik and Tor Arne Ursin are still a part of Grenland Friteater.

In the early 80s, the theatre was reinforced by actors Geddy Aniksdal and Anne Erichsen, and producer Hans Petter Eliassen. From the early 90s, Grenland Friteater has also cooperated with a lot of young talents. Today there are 9 core members, and several freelancers working on the different projects.

== Evolution ==
In the last few years, the theatre has done some bigger projects, many of them outdoors. Some of these are "Smuglere", "Harde Tak" and "Peer Gynt" (Peer Gynt was done in cooperation with Teater Ibsen). The theatre has also done productions for children - one is "En rosenkål for mye" by Gro Dahle.

In the early 90s, the theatre started to arrange the theatre festival "en Sommernattsdrøm", which was later renamed Porsgrunn International Theatre Festival. Having toured a lot, the theatre invited the best performers they knew to Porsgrunn. The festival contains New Circus, comedies and outdoor plays in world class, and it has become part of the city's identity.
