= Kilden Performing Arts Centre =

- Kilden teater og konserthus

General information
- Type: Arts complex
- Architectural style: Modernism
- Location: Kristiansand, Norway
- Coordinates: 58°8′20.81″N 7°59′49.73″E
- Completed: 2012
- Opened: 6 January 2012

Technical details
- Structural system: Characteristic Oak waves at the sea front.

Design and construction
- Architects: ALA Architects, Finland and SMS Arkitekter, Norway
- Main contractor: AF group

Kilden Performing Arts Centre (in Norwegian: Kilden teater og konserthus) is a theater and concert hall on Odderøya in Kristiansand, Norway. It houses Kilden Teater, Kristiansand Symphony Orchestra (KSO), Kilden Opera and Kilden Culture Venue in a joint project never previously embarked upon. There is room for a variety of concerts and other forms of cultural expression.

== The Company ==
The building is built and owned by the company "Kilden teater og konserthus IKS", and Kristiansand Municipality (60%) and Agder County (40%) are owners. The company was established in 2003 and the name Kilden (meaning "the source") specified in 2006.

== The building ==
Work on the building began in 2007, and Crown Princess Mette-Marit of Norway laid the foundation stone in 2009. The opening was officially finished 6 January 2012. Its architects were Finnish ALA Architects and Norwegian SMS Arkitekter, acoustical consultants were Brekke & Strand, the acoustic design of the concert hall was by Arup and the main contractor was AF group. The building has a gross area of 16,000 square meters and a volume of 128,000 cubic meters. The building cost nearly 1.7 billion Norwegian krones.

== Halls ==
The building has four stages:

- Concert Hall with 1 130 seats
- Theatre & Opera Hall with 700 seats, orchestra pit with space for 60 musicians
- Multi-room with 220 seats or 400 standing
- Intimate Hall with 100 seats
