= ALA Architects =

Finnish architecture firm

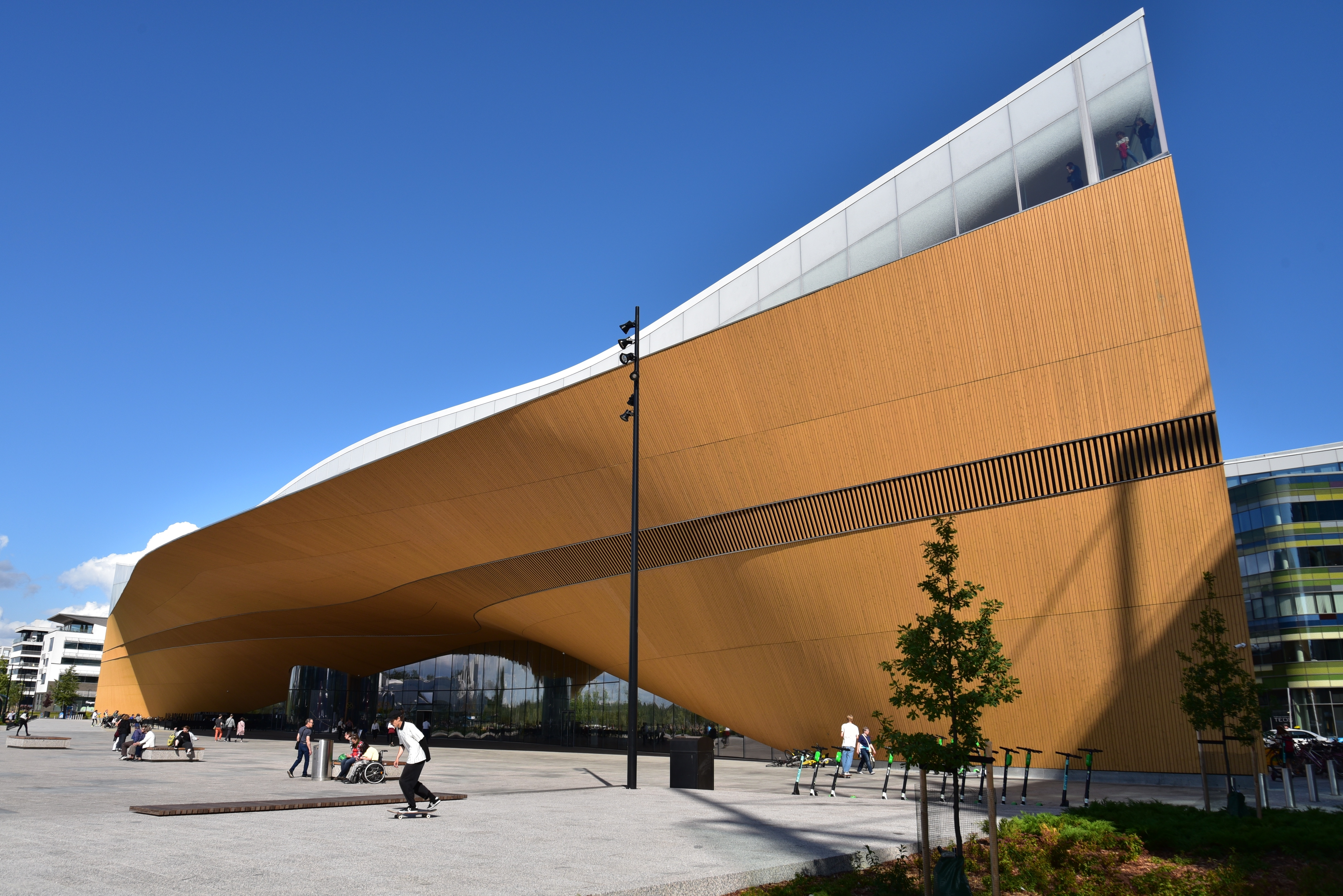
- Helsinki Central Library Oodi

Practice information
- Partners: Samuli Woolston, Juho Grönholm, and Antti Nousjoki
- Founded: 2005
- Location: Helsinki, Finland

Significant works and honors
- Projects: Kilden Performing Arts Centre and Helsinki Central Library Oodi
- Awards: Finnish State Price for Architecture (2012)

Website
- ala.fi

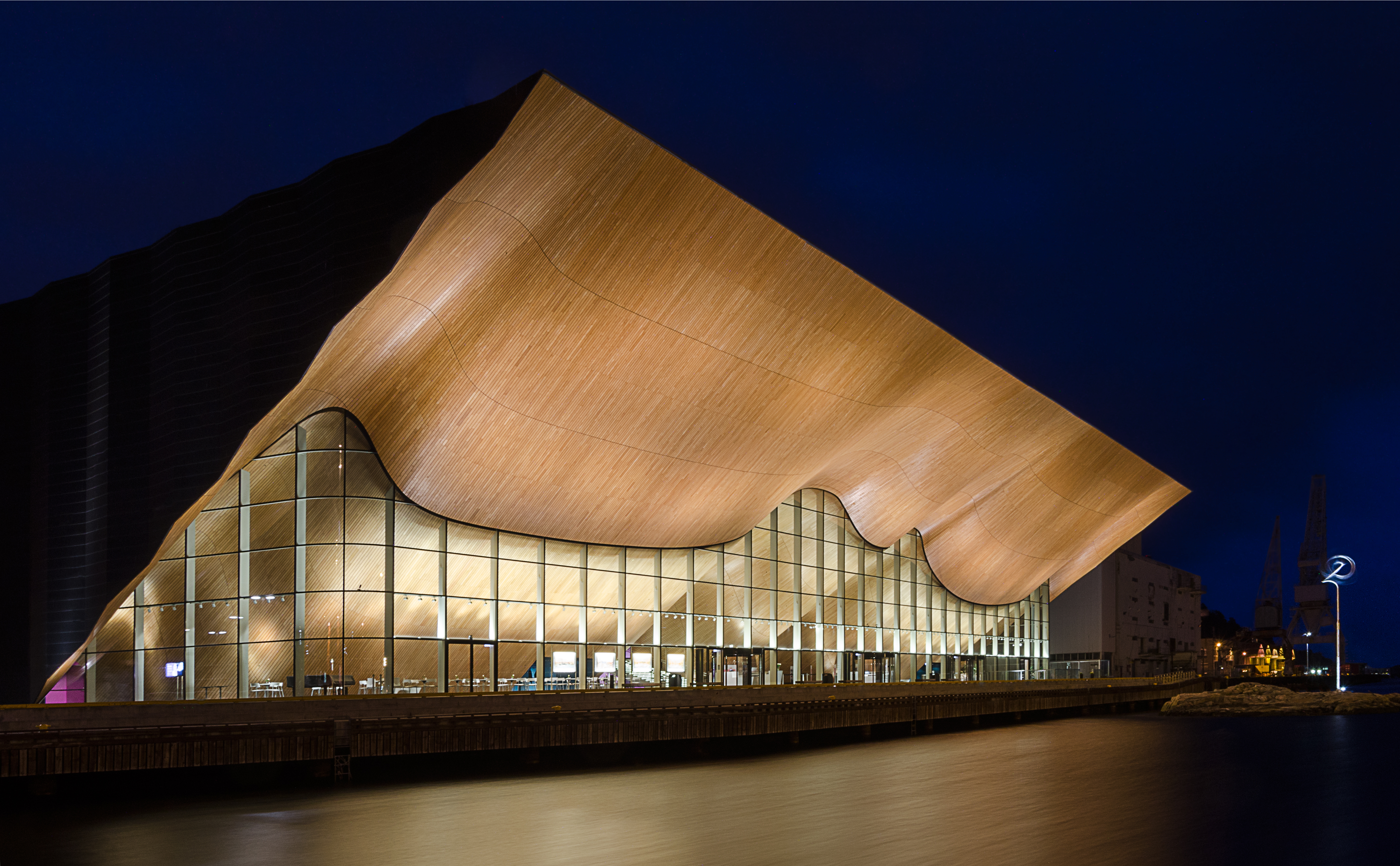
Kilden Performing Arts Centre at night

ALA Architects (Finnish: Arkkitehtitoimisto ALA) is a Finnish architectural firm specialising in public buildings, renovation projects and master planning. In particular, the firm is known for designing several high-profile cultural buildings, such as the Helsinki Central Library Oodi and the Kilden Performing Arts Centre in Kristiansand, Norway. ALA was founded by Juho Grönholm, Antti Nousjoki, Janne Teräsvirta, and Samuli Woolston in 2005.

In 2012, ALA won the Finnish State Price for Architecture. The company was a finalist for the Finlandia Prize for Architecture for the Oodi Library in 2019, and for the Lappeenranta City Theatre in 2016.

== History ==
ALA Architects was founded in 2005 after Juho Grönholm, Antti Nousjoki, Janne Teräsvirta, and Samuli Woolston won a competition to design the Kilden Performing Arts Centre in Kristiansand, Norway. The project immediately brought the company international attention, as did winning the Helsinki Central Library competition in 2013. Both Kilden and Oodi feature a monumental inclined wooden wall forming an overhang, which has been described as a trademark of ALA.

== Selected works ==
ALA is particularly known for its cultural buildings, including:

- Nokia Oulu Campus (2025)
- Embassy of Finland, New Delhi, India, renovation (2018)
- Helsinki Central Library Oodi (2018)
- Dipoli building, Espoo, renovation (2017)
- Kilden Performing Arts Centre, Kristiansand, Norway (2012)

In the 2020s, it designed transportation facilities, such as the extension wing of Helsinki Airport and five stations of the Helsinki metro western extension (Keilaniemi, Aalto University, Soukka, Kivenlahti, and Espoonlahti, the first two with Esa Piironen).

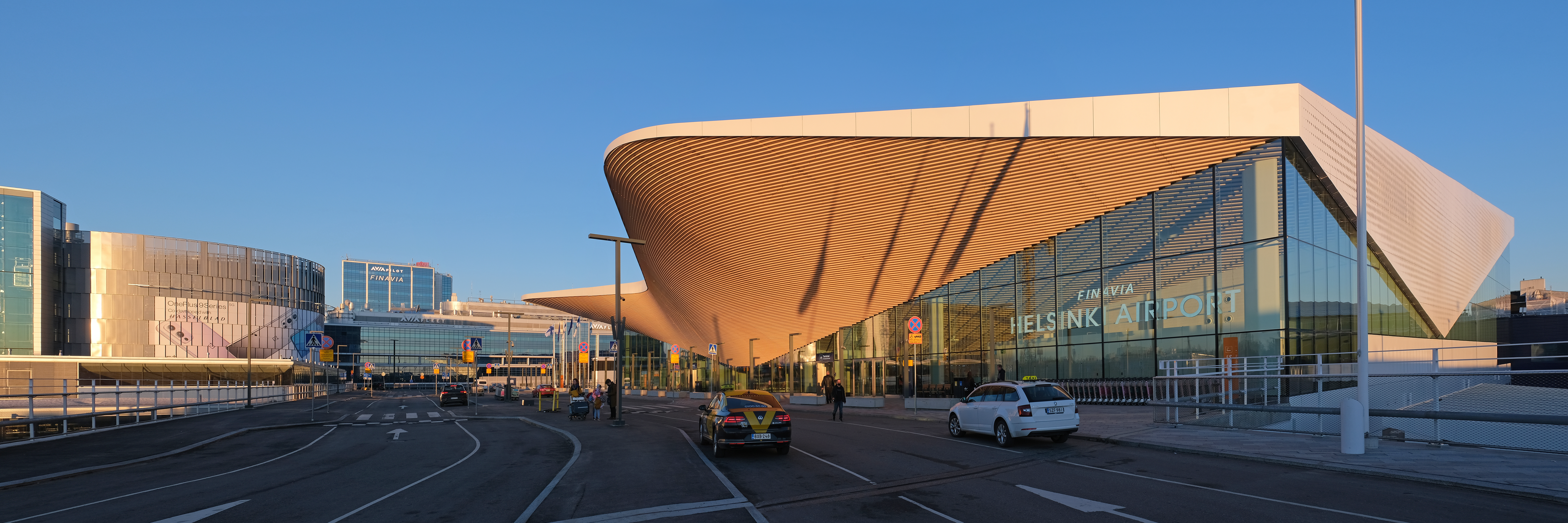
Helsinki Airport terminal extension

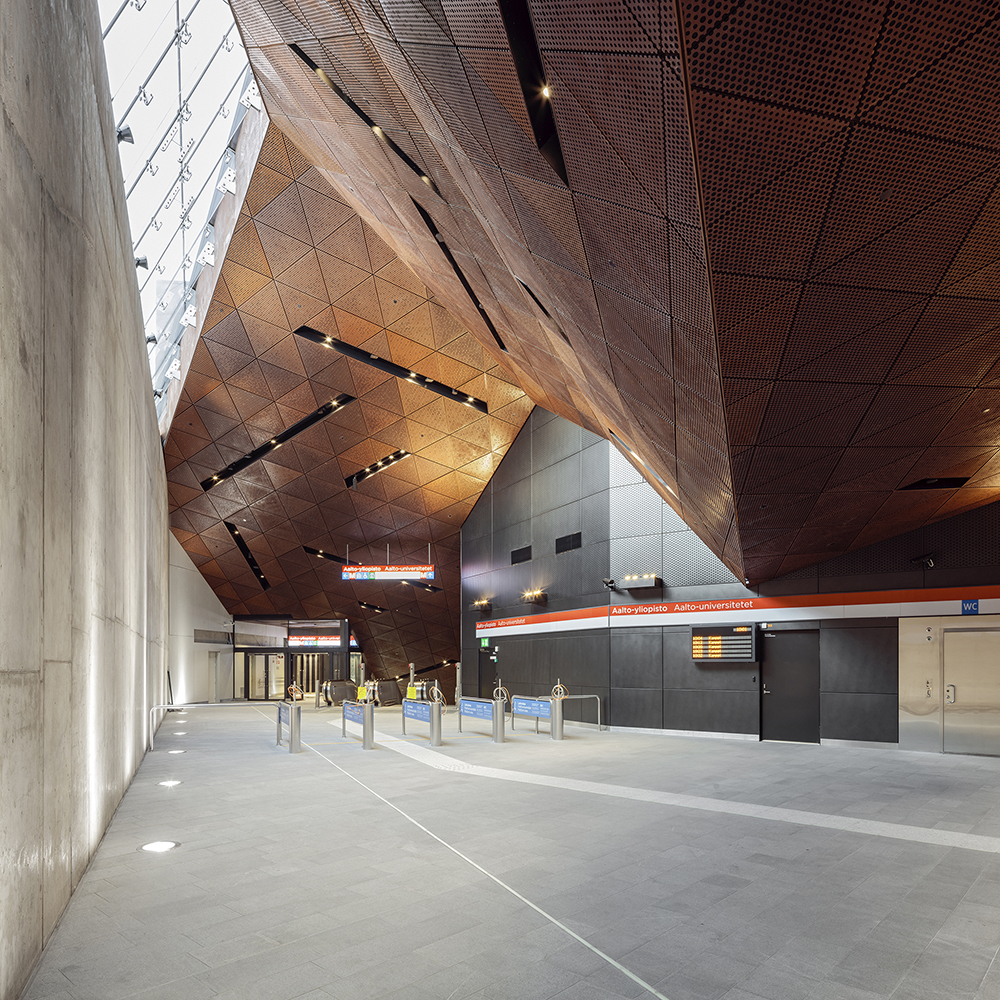
Aalto University metro station

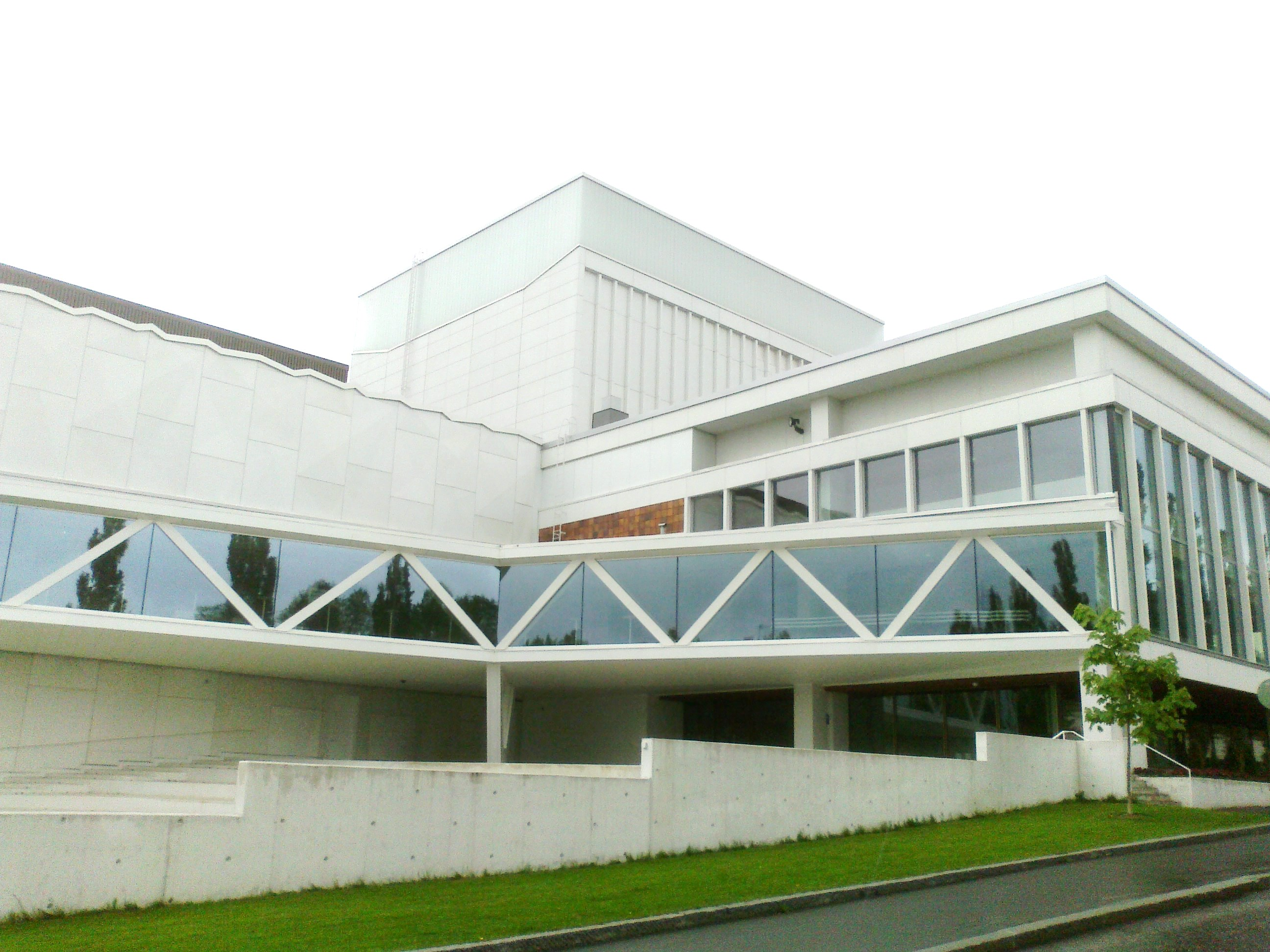
Kuopio City Theatre

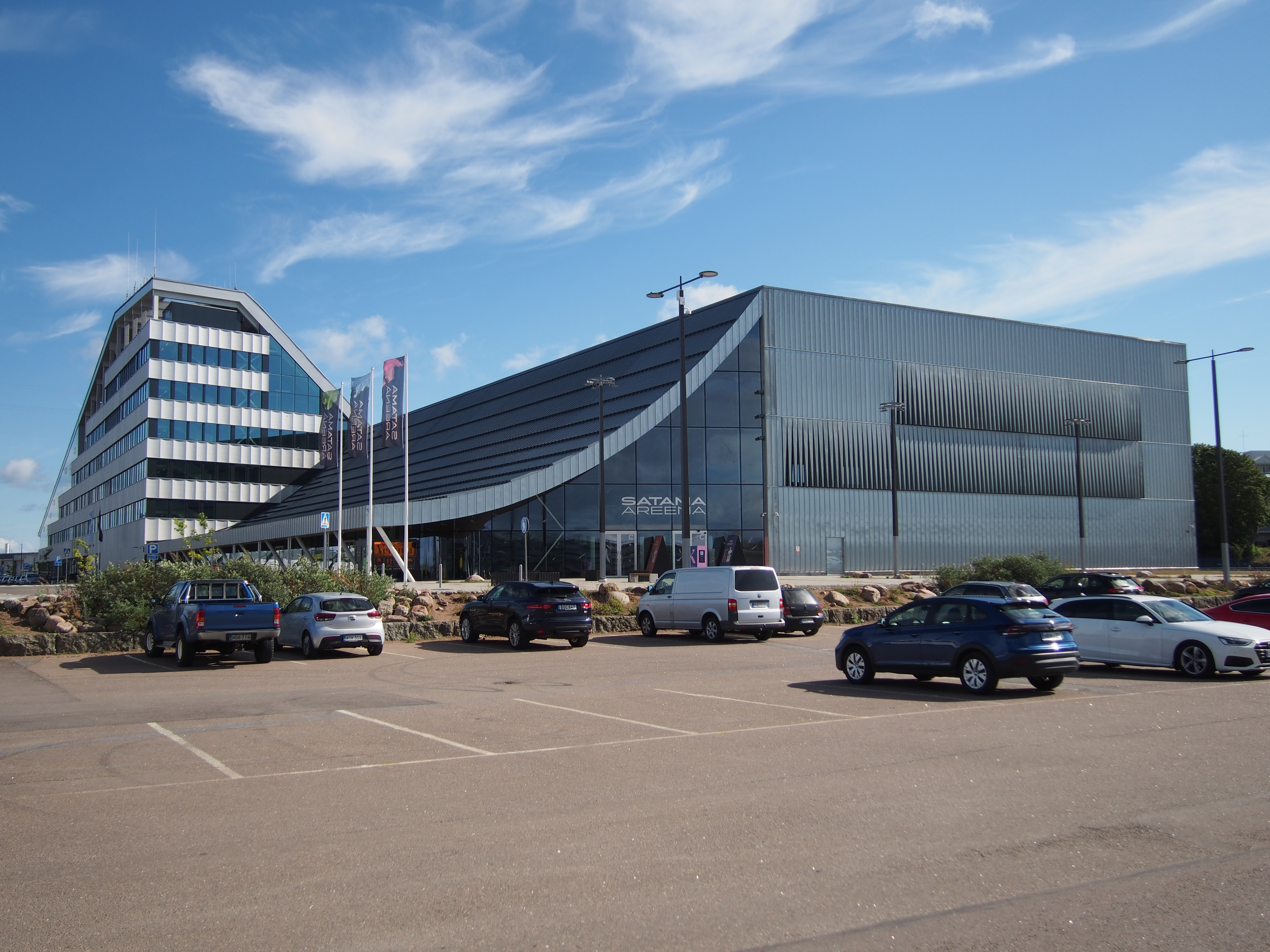
Event Centre Satama

== Awards and recognitions ==
ALA Architects has been shortlisted for the Finlandia Prize for Architecture twice: for the Lappeenranta City Theatre in 2016, and for the Helsinki Central Library Oodi in 2019. In 2022, ALA won the Prix Versailles for the Helsinki Airport terminal extension.

In 2012, ALA Architects was awarded the Finnish State Price for Architecture; in their justification, the jury stated that "ALA architects have shown that they are capable of designing and implementing impressive architecture of international standards. [They] have also been a key factor in the development of a whole new generation of architecture in Finland."

== Publications ==
- Grönholm, Juho; Nousjoki, Antti; Woolston, Samuli (2023). ALA Architects – Practice. Garret Publications. ISBN 978-952-7222-18-8.
