= Bloody Angels =

1998 Norwegian thriller film

- Directed by: Karin Julsrud
- Written by: Kjetil Indregard
- Starring: Reidar Sørensen; Stig Henrik Hoff; Lailia Goody
- Cinematography: Philip Øgaard
- Edited by: Sophie Hesselberg
- Release date: 26 December 1998
- Running time: 100 minutes
- Country: Norway
- Language: Norwegian

Bloody Angels (Norwegian: 1732 Høtten) is a 1998 Norwegian thriller film directed by Karin Julsrud, starring Reidar Sørensen, Stig Henrik Hoff and Lailia Goody.The film was Julsrud's directorial début

== Plot ==
In the small village of Høtten, six months after the rape and murder of a 13-year-old girl, one of the suspects is found dead. Nicholas Ramm (Reidar Sørensen) has to investigate the crime.

== Reception ==
Reviewers were split on the film, but generally not very positive. In a review for Norwegian newspaper Verdens Gang, Jon Selås gave the movie a "die throw" of one and called it a "speculative, purposeless and ice-cold miss". Eirik W. Alver of Dagbladet was slightly more satisfied with the film, giving it three points. Though he was not bored by the movie, he found the characters and the environment caricatured.
