= Kilden Teater =

Theatre in Kristiansand, Norway

Coordinates: 58°8′34.31″N 7°59′42.95″E

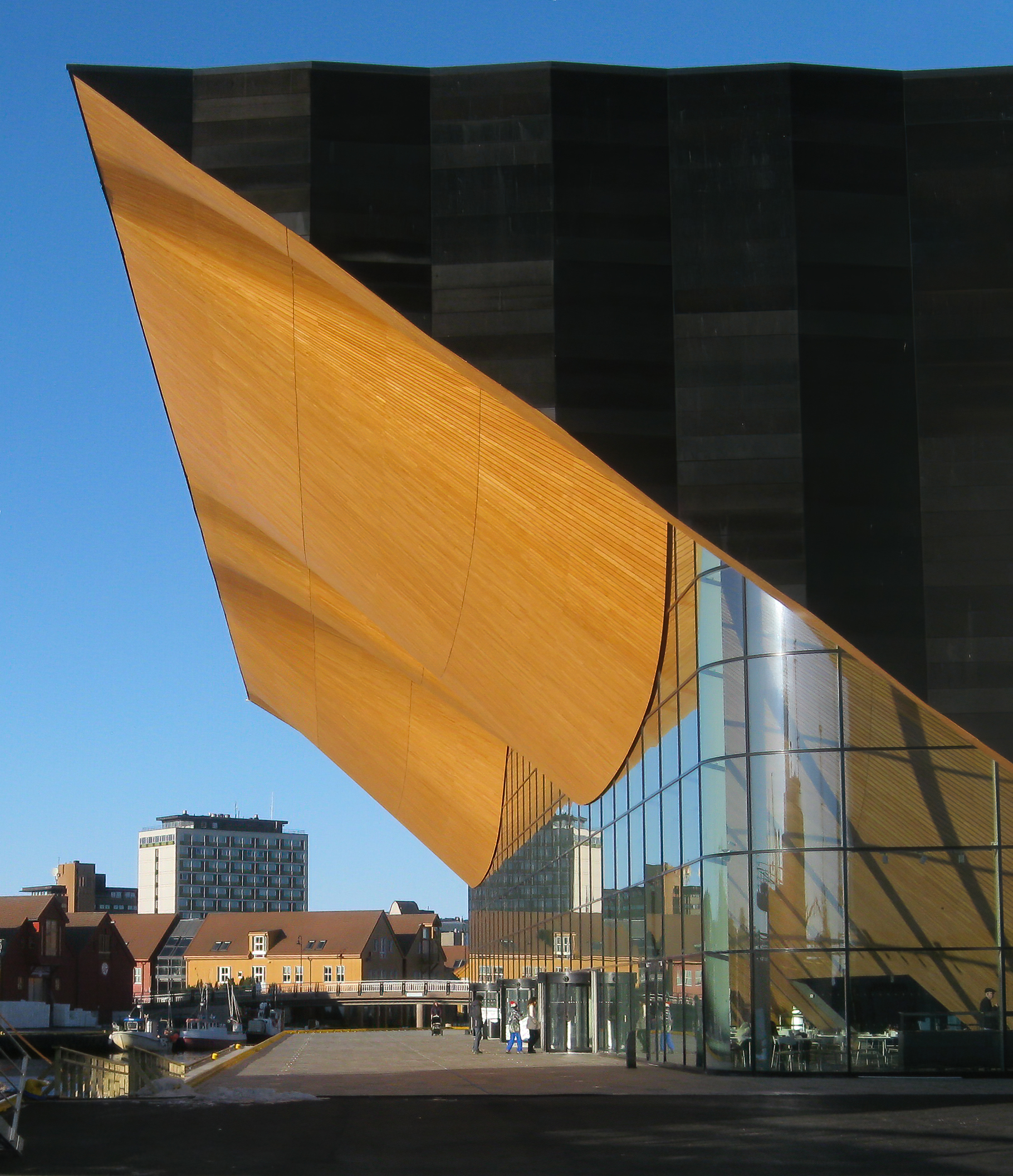
The new Kilden Performing Arts Centre (opened January 2012) is a center of performing art, and the new host of Kilden Teater, Opera Sør and Kristiansand Symphony Orchestra

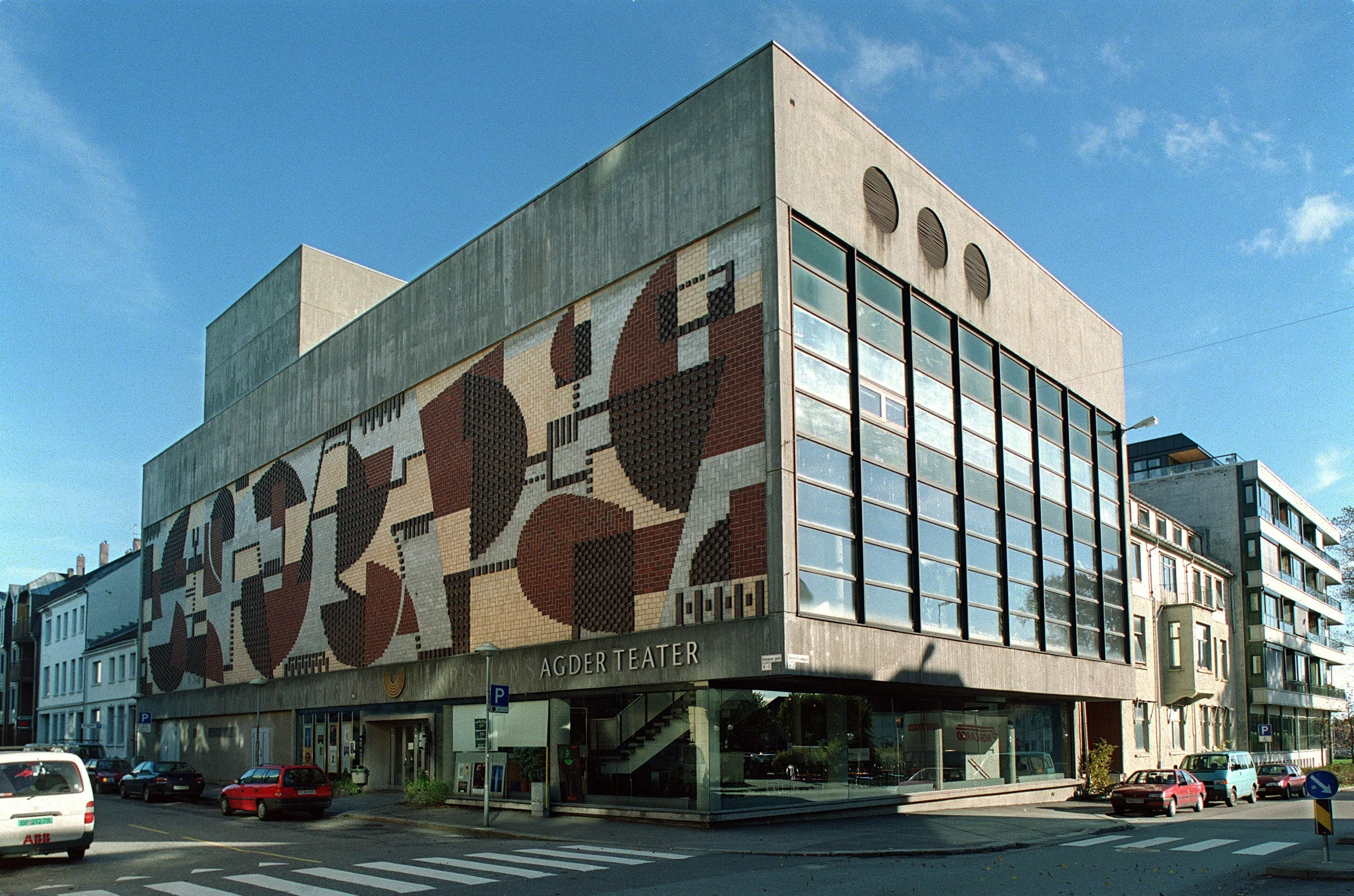
The old base facility of Agder Teater

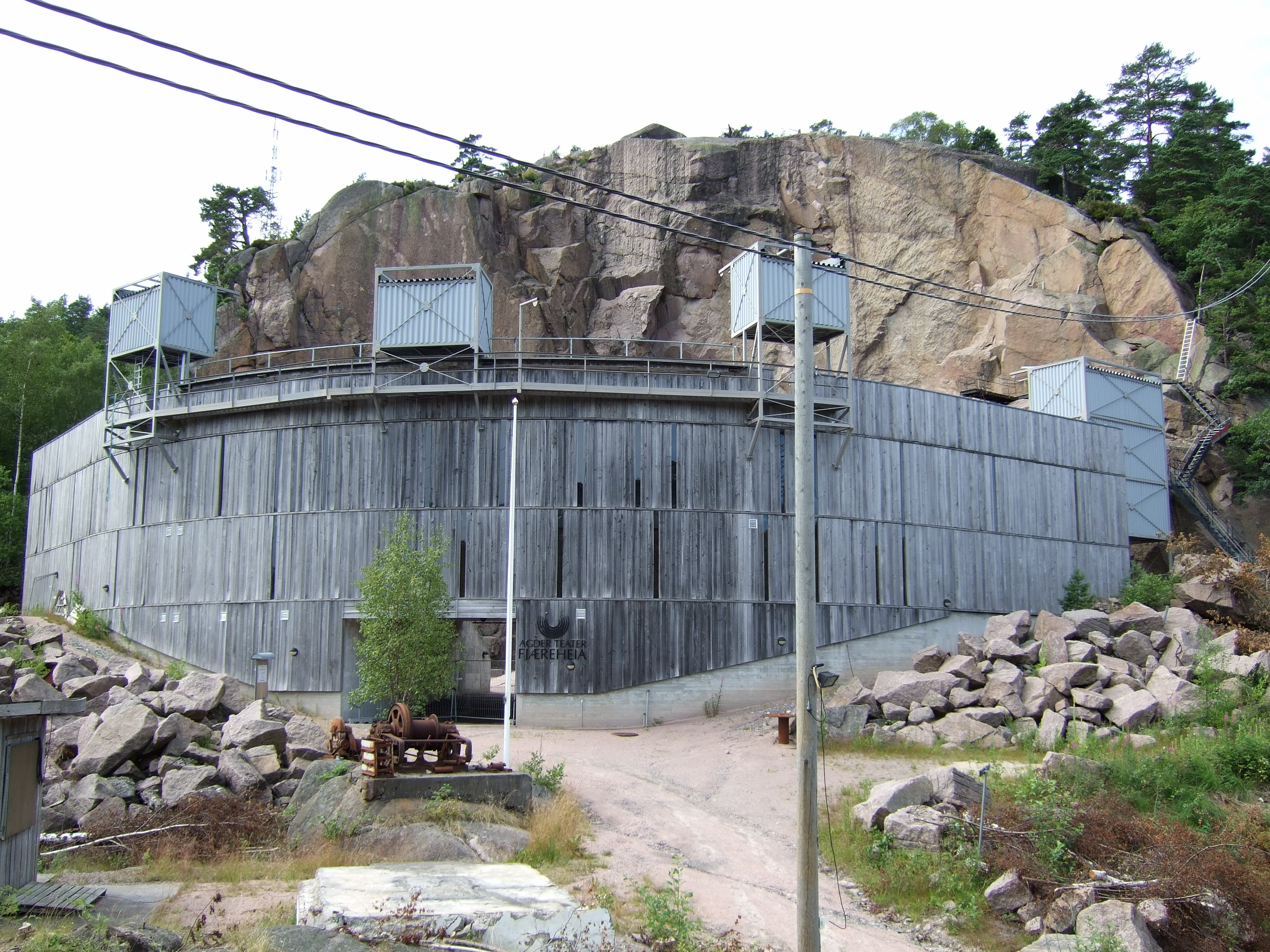
Agder teater, scene Fjæreheia, Grimstad. Theatre from outside

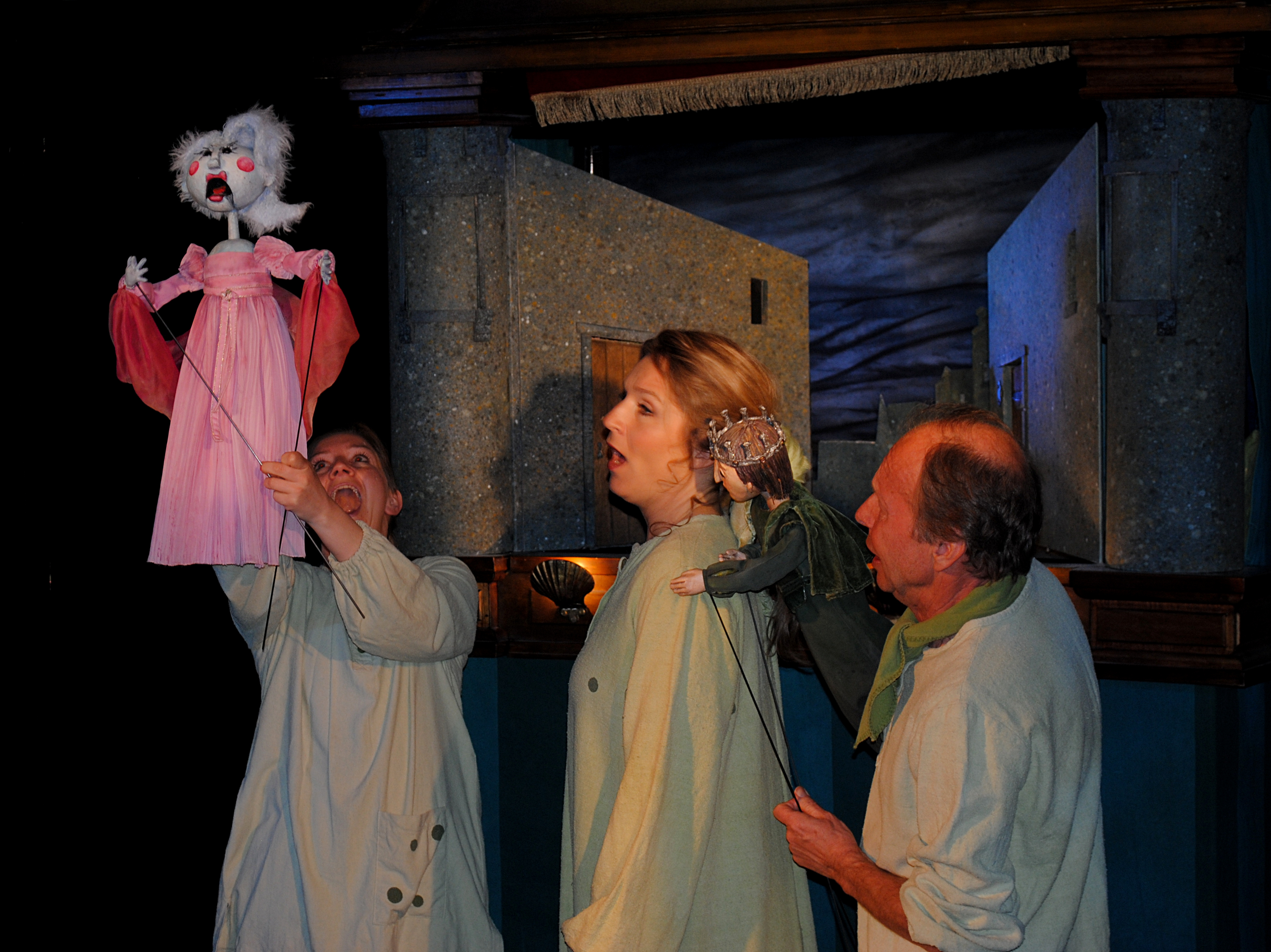
Actors from Agder teater performing «The Princess and the Pea» in schools in 2013. Credit: Heidi Arild, Aust-Agder bibliotek og kulturformidling

Kilden Teater is a Norwegian theatre based in Kristiansand. It was established in 1991, and has been the regional theatre for Agder since 1995. It was earlier named Agder Teater, but changed its name after moving in to the new Kilden Performing Arts Centre.

Its first theatre director was Bentein Baardson, who led the theatre from 1991 to 1994. Alex Scherpf has been theatre director since 2005.
