= Nordland Teater =

Theatre in Nordland, Norway

Nordland Teater is a Norwegian theatre based in Mo i Rana. It was established in 1977 by Norwegian Parliament as the regional theatre for Nordland. Birgitte Strid has been theatre director since 2013.

== Theatre directors ==
- 1979–1986 Collective leadership
- 1987 Three-man-committee (Geir Næss, Stig Bang, Bodvar Moe)
- 1988–1990 Wolfgang Kolneder
- 1991 Bjørn Skjefstad
- 1992 Torbjørn Gabrielsen
- 1993–1996 Thom Bastholm
- 1997–2000 Frode Rasmussen
- 2001–2007 Thor Inge Gullvåg
- 2008–2012 Reidar Sørensen
- 2013– Birgitte Strid
