= Teater Ibsen =

Theatre in Skien, Norway

- Interactive map of Teater Ibsen
- Address: Hollenderigata 15, 3732 Skien; Skien; Norway
- Coordinates: 59°35′56″N 10°45′06″E

Website
- https://teateribsen.no/

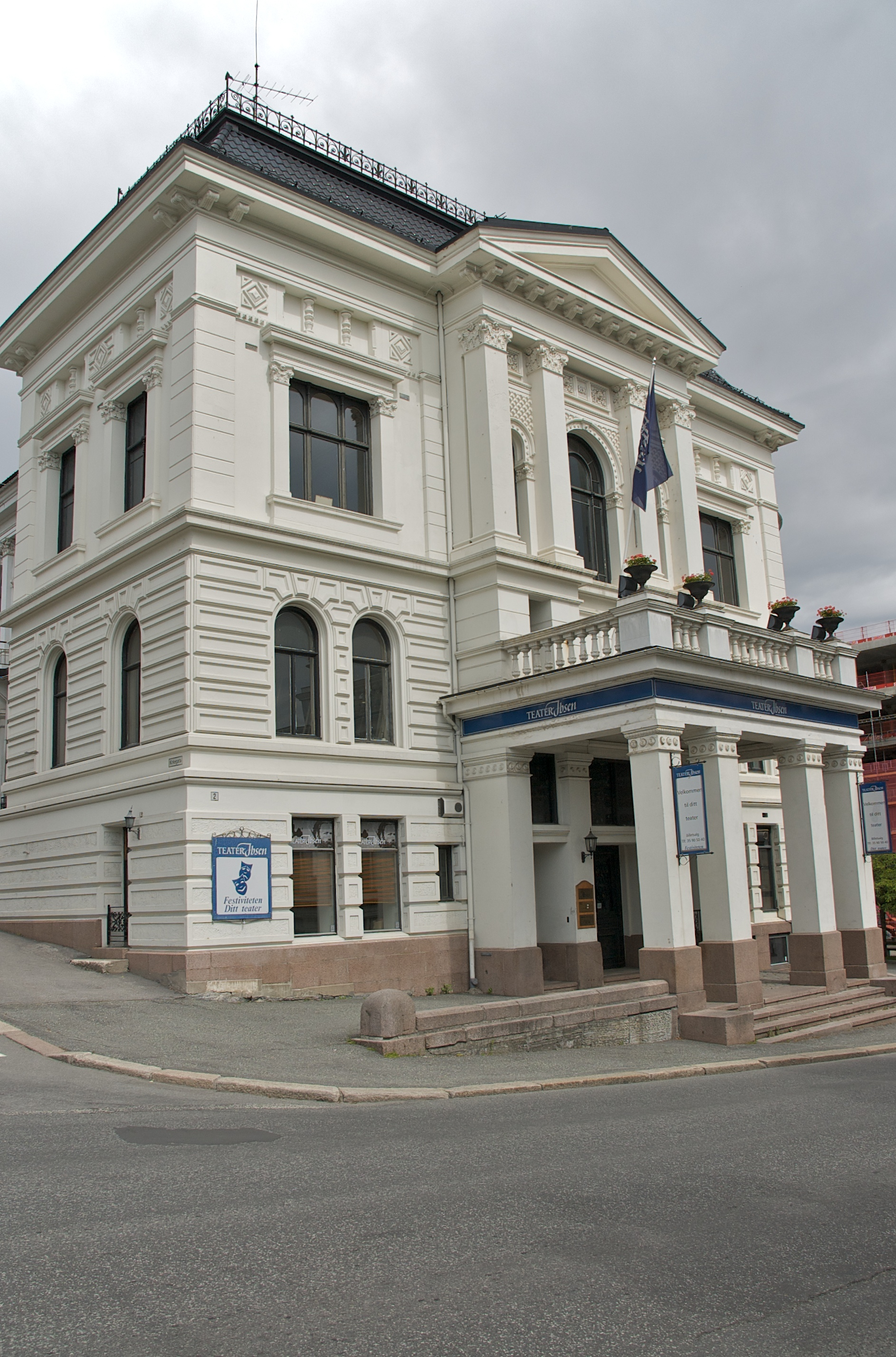
Teater Ibsen played at Festiviteten from 1986 to 2010.

Teater Ibsen (from 1975 to 1991 Telemark Teater) is a theatre in Skien in Telemark, Norway. The theatre was established in 1975 as Telemark Teater, and changed its name to Teater Ibsen in 1991. The theatre serves as regional theatre for the counties of Telemark and Vestfold. From 1986 to 2010 the theatre played at Festiviteten in Skien, and relocated to a former industrial site at Klosterøya in Skien in 2011. Anders T. Andersen was appointed artistical director from 2010. The current artistic director is Line Rosvoll. The theatre is also home to the biennial Ibsen Scope Festival.
