= Hålogaland Teater =

Dramatic theatre in Norway

Coordinates: 69.6418°N 18.9442°E

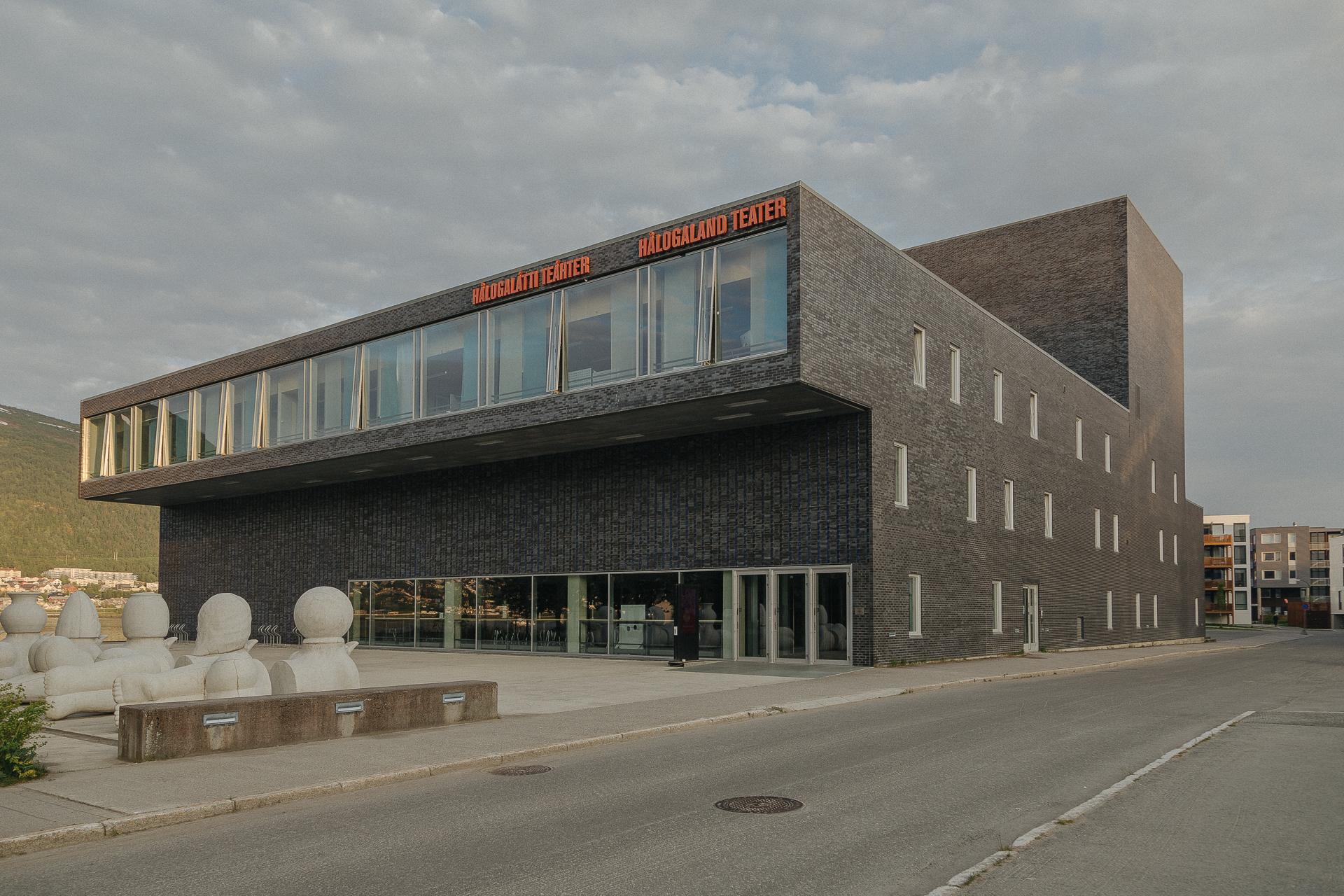
- Interactive map of the Hålogaland Teater area

General information
- Type: Arts complex
- Architectural style: Contemporary
- Location: Tromsø, Norway, Teaterplassen 1, Tromsø
- Completed: 2005
- Opened: 5 November 2005
- Cost: 259 million kr
- Client: Statsbygg
- Owner: Tromsø Municipality

Height
- Height: 22.5 m

Technical details
- Size: 5150 m^{2}

Design and construction
- Architects: Karin Hagen, Asbjørn Værnes, Torunn Lein, Ingerid Helseth
- Architecture firm: Vulkan Arkitekter AS
- Structural engineer: Bj Vileid, Asplan Viak AS
- Awards: 2005 Building of the Year by The Norwegian Building Industry Association

Other information
- Seating capacity: 330 (West), 130 (East) 100 (North)

Website
- halogalandteater.no

Hålogaland Teater is a regional theatre serving the region of Nord-Norge, the northernmost of Norway. It got its name after the northernmost county in Norway in the Middle Ages Hålogaland. When established in 1971, it was the first regional theatre in Norway and the first professional theatre in Nord-Norge. Many of its productions are staged in the regional Norwegian dialects. Although based in Tromsø in the Arctic Circle, where it occupies a modern purpose-built building, the theatre also tours the surrounding rural areas. The varied schedule includes a mixture of genres, contemporary and classic drama, and musical and children's theatre.

== History ==
Lars Berg (1901–1969) a local-based novelist, short story writer and playwright, had campaigned for a regional theatre since the 1940s. He intended to bring drama in local dialects into the far-flung communities of the region. His vision was realised when the theatre began work, on 15 August 1971. While the first production, The Threepenny Opera (Die Dreigroschenoper) by German composers Bertolt Brecht (1898–1956) and Kurt Weill (1900–1950), received positive critical reviews, only 16 people attended the premiere. At the time, the theatre consisted of only 8 actors and two technicians and lacked a permanent home.

Early productions tended to highlight political and social issues, but this radical edge faded as the theatre diversified. Originally it operated across all three counties in the region, but since the foundation of the Nordland Teater, it has focused mainly on Troms and Finnmark.

Its first permanent theatre space was found in 1984, at the new arts centre (Kulturhuset) in Tromsø. In 1986 actor and director Bernhard Ramstad got a job as a theater manager.

In 2005, it moved into a new purpose-built theatre building, officially opened by Queen Sonja of Norway on November 5. This building, designed by Vulkan architects, includes three theatre stages, as well as dressing rooms, workshops, and public spaces, a vast improvement on previous homes, which have included a disused margarine factory. The building is located in the harbor area. which is experiencing urban development and transformation. Its facade is made from dark engobed Dutch bricks glazed with blue and silver. The main structure of the building was made from reinforced concrete. As of 2005, the theatre has around 50 employees, including technical, administrative, and artistic workers, and a mixture of young and established actors. One of the theater's biggest successes was a full-length piece about the northern Norwegian village hero Oluf Rallkattli written and portrayed by Arthur Arntzen. This became the theater's greatest audience success. Arntzen repeated the success of a new performance in 1996. The show was played for a whole year and ended at Moss in April 1997. The theater was selected as the millennium site for Troms county. The sculpture of "The seven Muses and the theater mascots" by Inghild Karlsen and Bo Bisgaard stands right by the main entrance of the theatre.

== Gallery ==
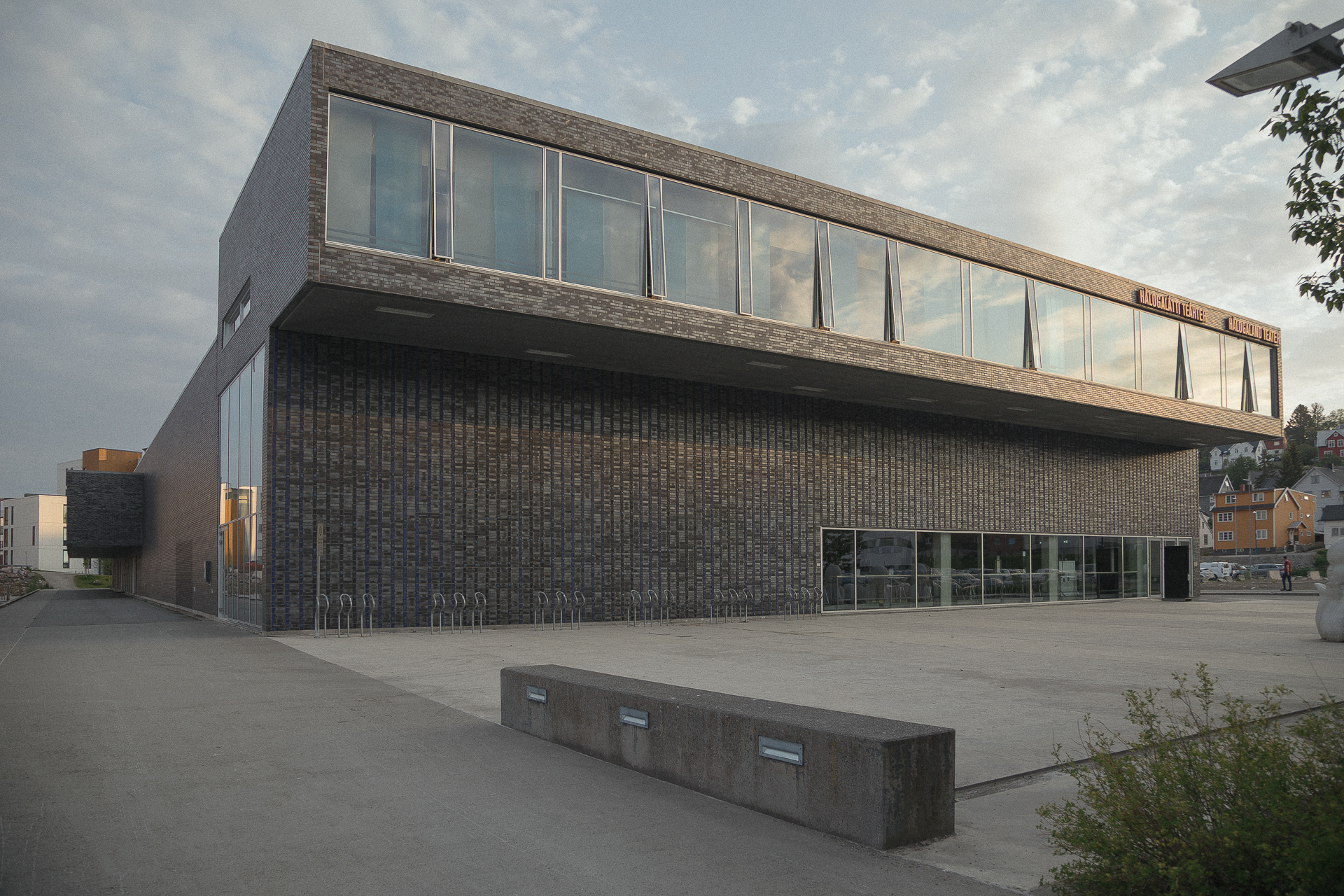
Theater Eastern façade

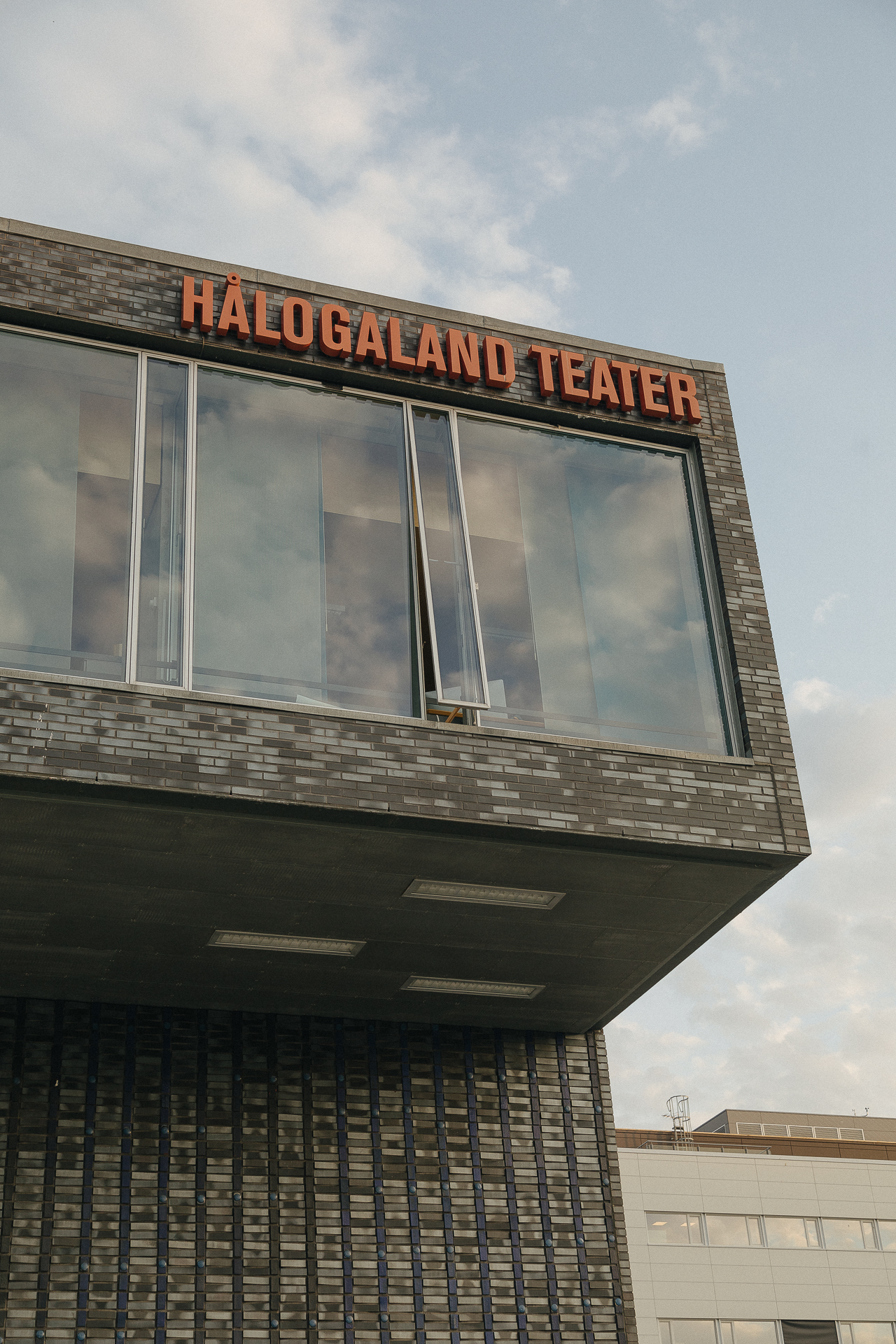
Entrance sign

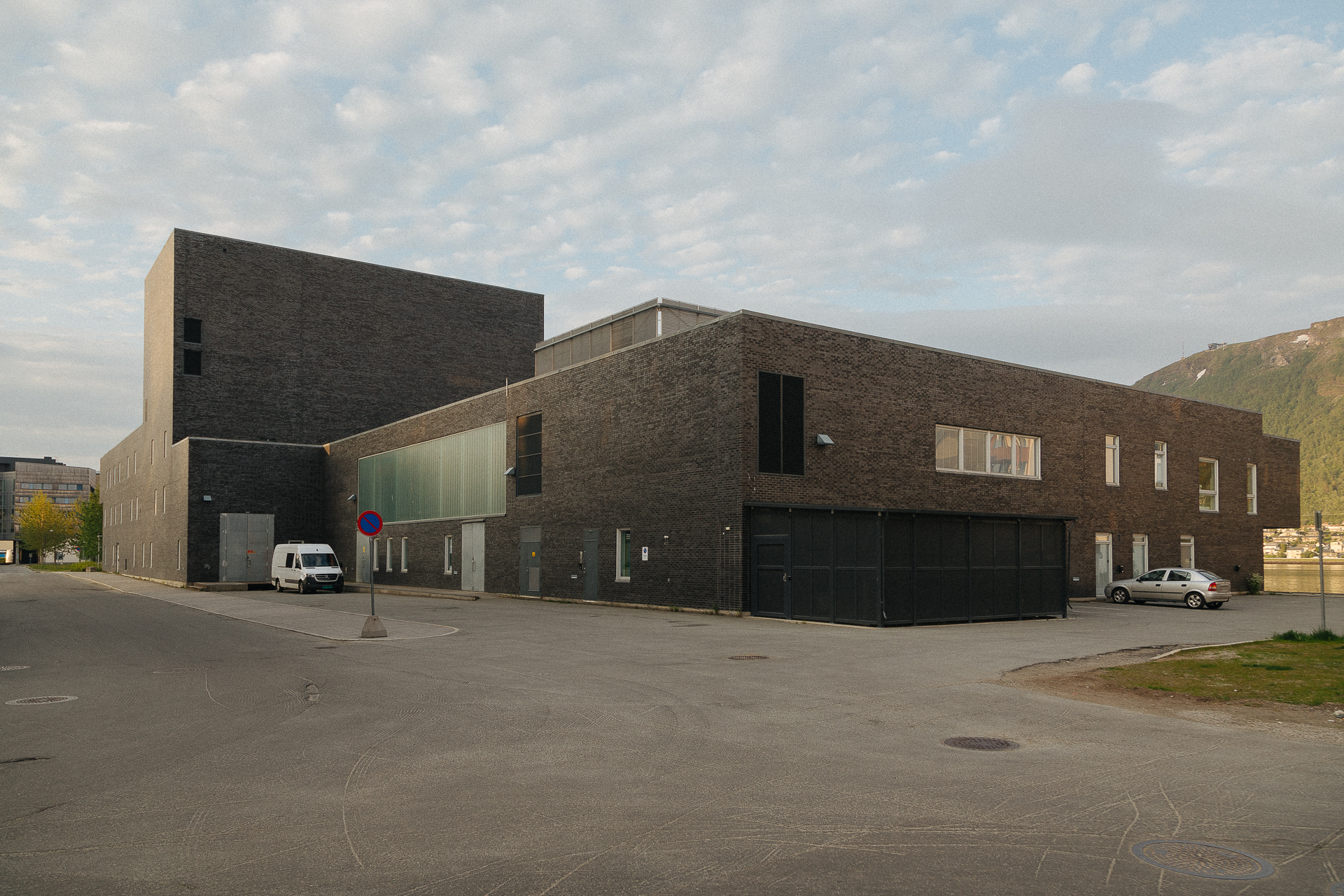
Theater Western façade

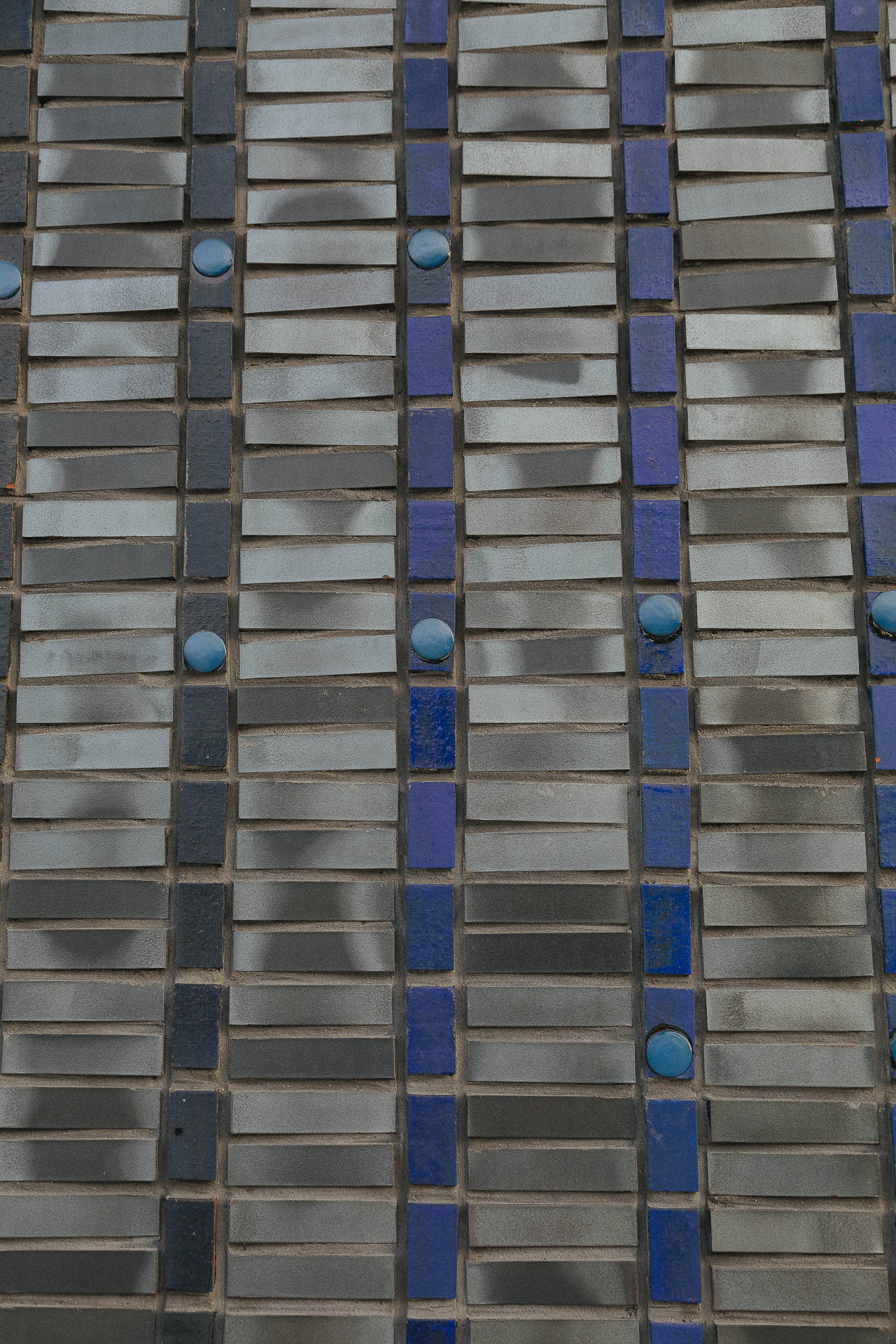
Façade bricks

== See also ==
- List of Norwegian theatres
- Hålogaland
- Culture of Norway

== Other sources ==
- Jens Harald Eilertsen (2004) Teater utenfor folkeskikken nordnorsk teaterhistorie fra istid til 1971 (Orkana Forlag AS: Stamsund) ISBN 82-8104-010-6
